= Tbilisi =

Capital and the largest city of Georgia (country)

Tbilisi თბილისი Tiflis
- Capital city
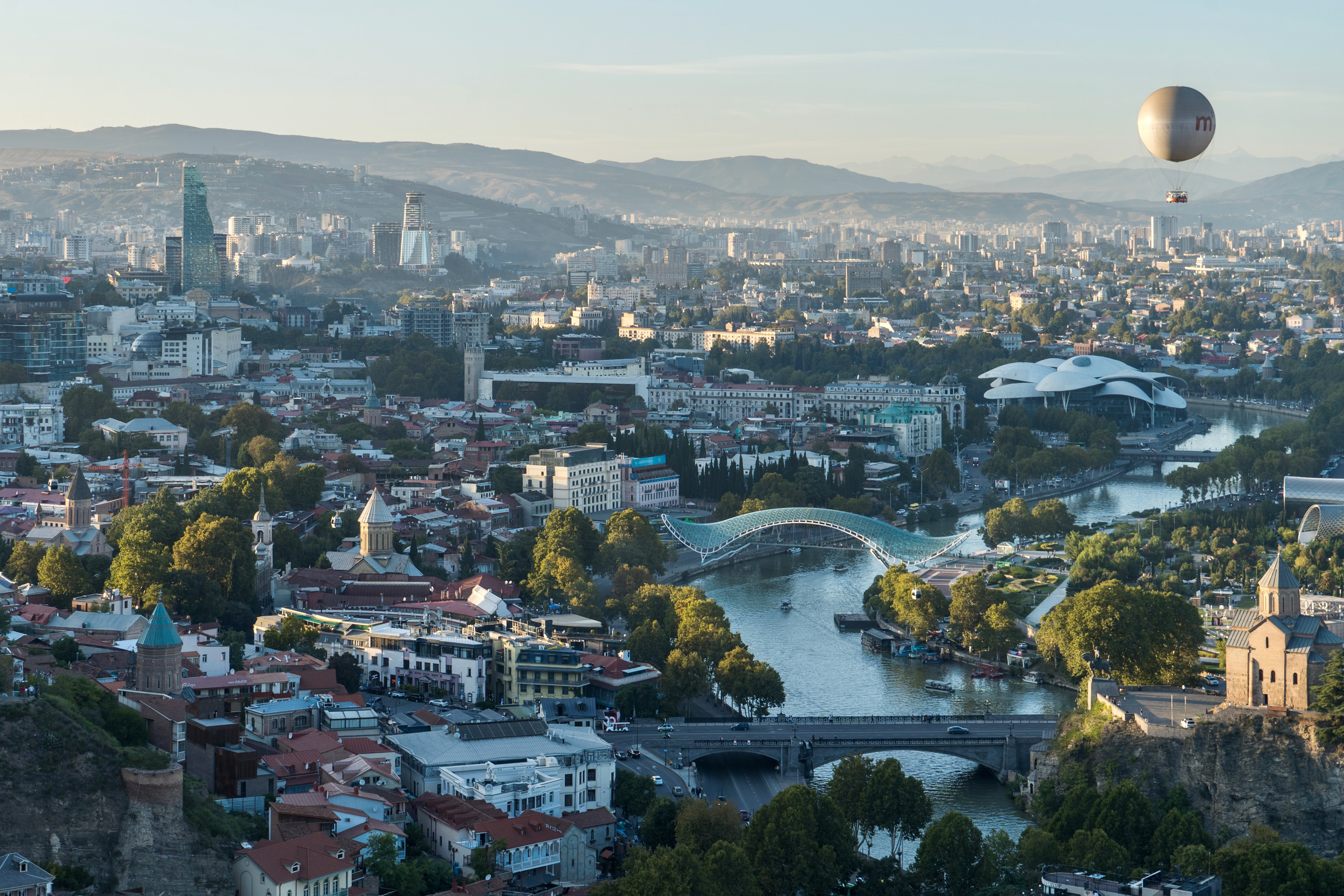
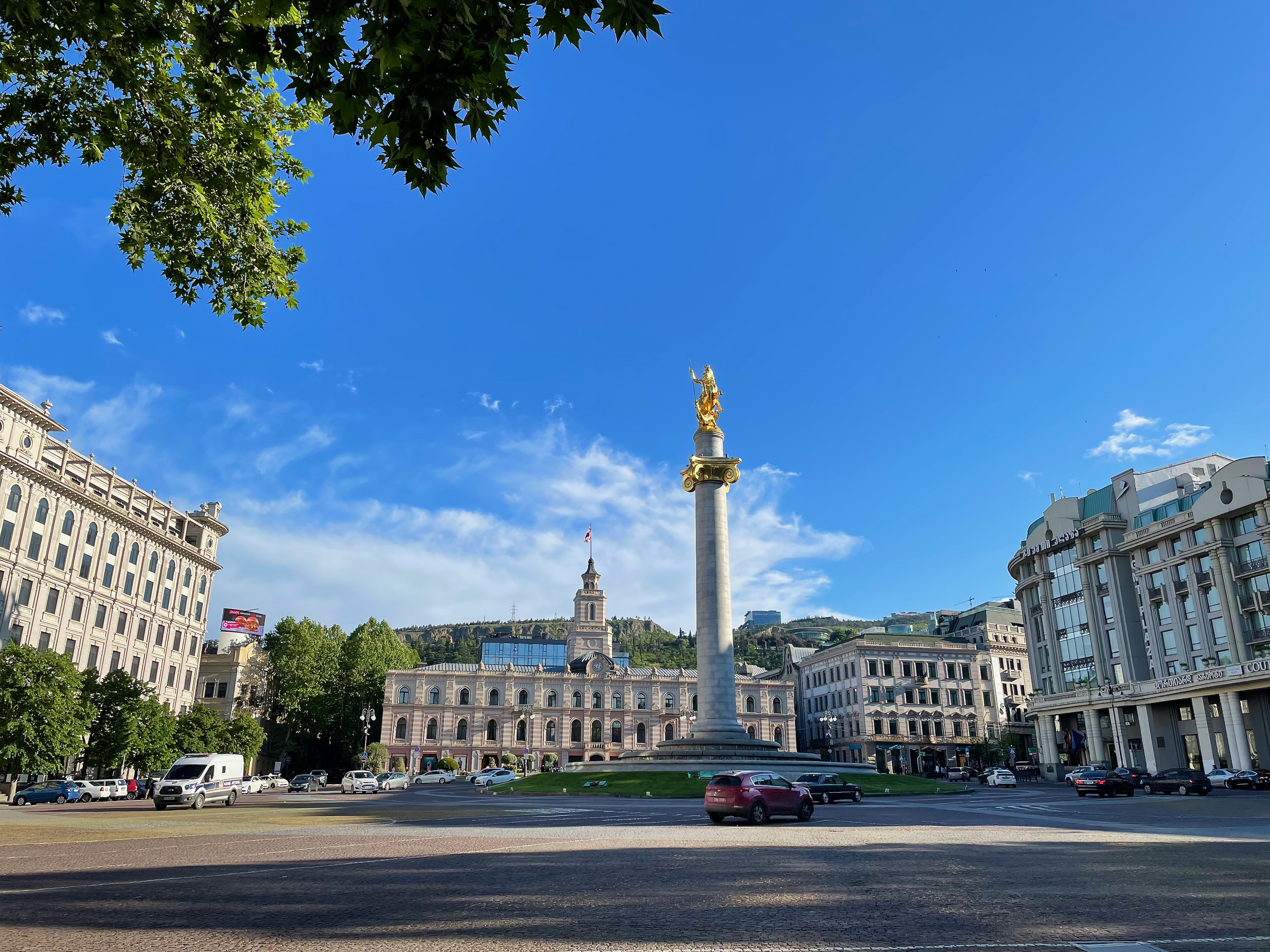
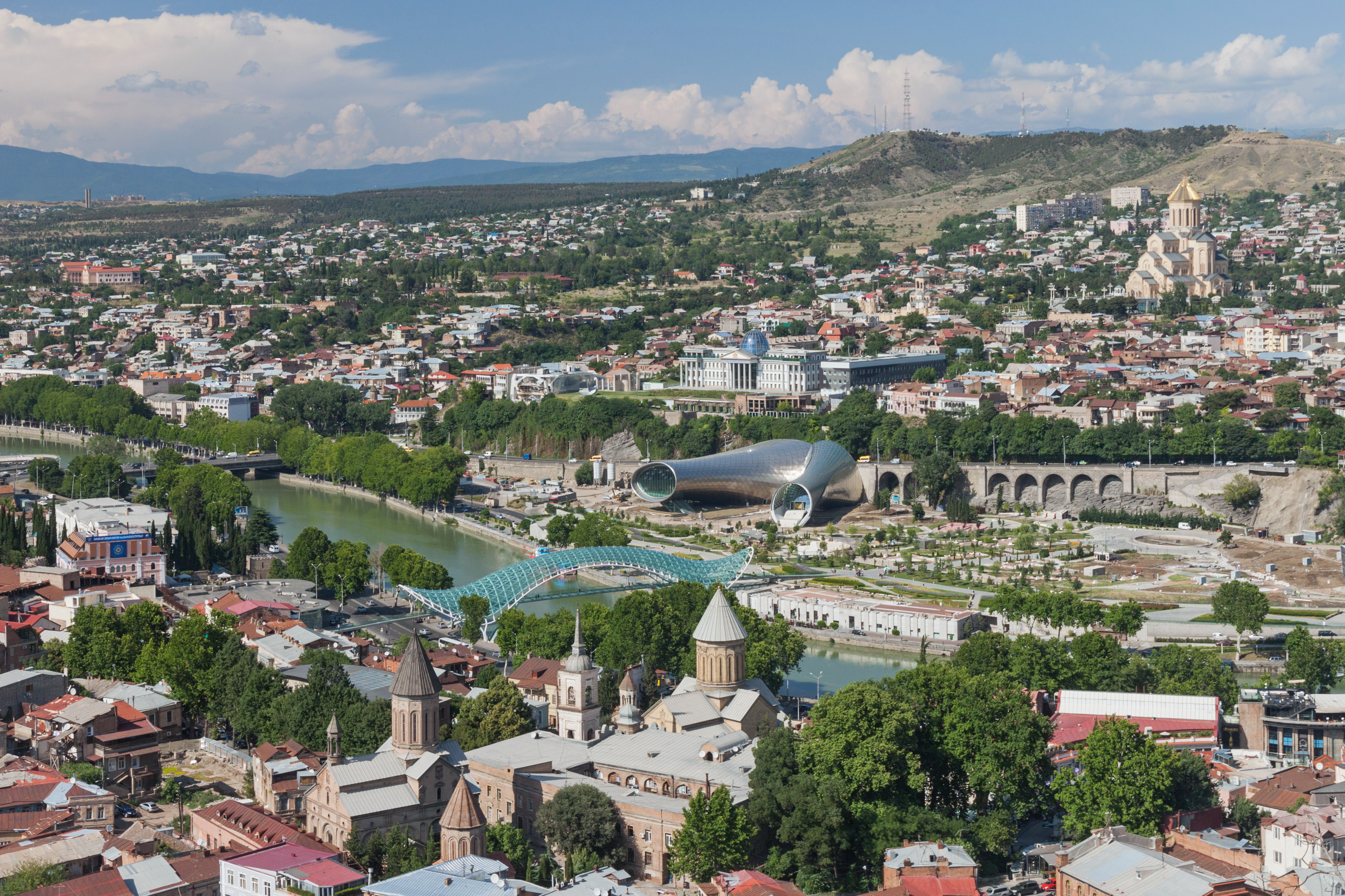
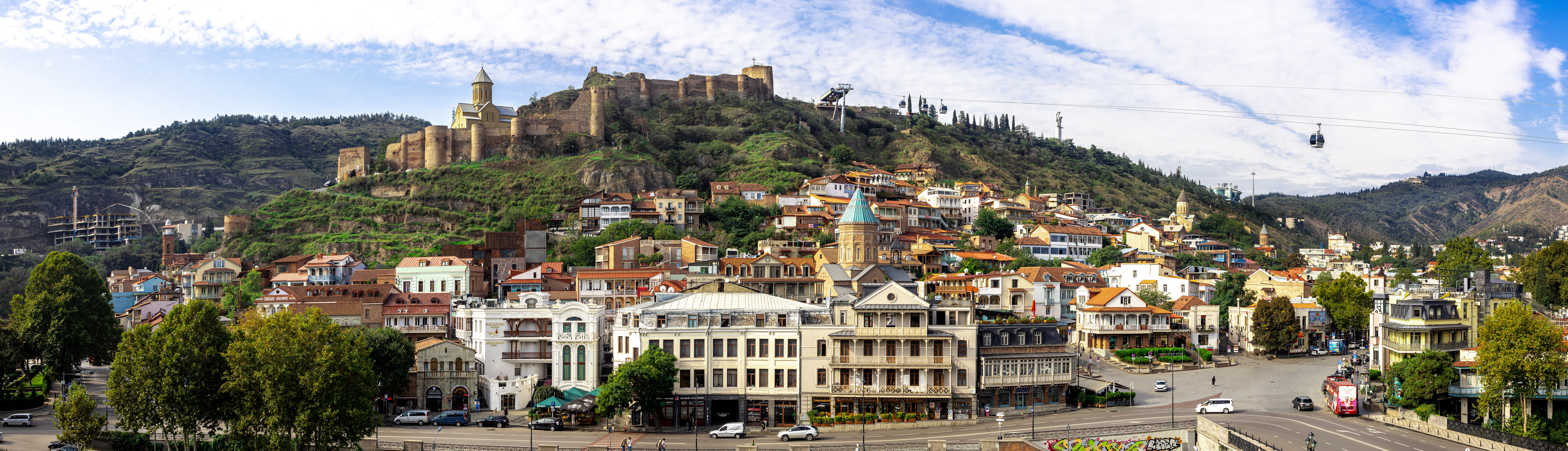
- Northfacing view of Tbilisi from Tabori Monastery Freedom Square Sioni Cathedral, Bridge of Peace, and Sameba. Old Town as viewed from Metekhi

- Flag Seal

- Tbilisi highlighted in Georgia

- Location within Georgia Location within Caucasus Mountains
- Coordinates: 41°43′21″N 44°47′33″E
- Country: Georgia
- Established: AD 455

Government
  - Type: Mayor–Council
  - Body: Tbilisi Sakrebulo
  - Mayor: Kakha Kaladze (GD)

Area
  - Capital city: 504.3 km^{2} (194.7 sq mi)
  - Metro: 726 km^{2} (280 sq mi)
- Highest elevation: 770 m (2,530 ft)
- Lowest elevation: 380 m (1,250 ft)

Population (2026)
  - Capital city: 1,369,400
  - Rank: 1st
  - Density: 2,496.08/km^{2} (6,464.8/sq mi)
- Demonym(s): Tbilisian თბილისელი, Tbiliseli (Georgian)

Population by ethnicity
  - Georgians: 85.4%
  - Armenians: 4.1%
  - Azerbaijanis: 2.0%
  - Russians: 1.7%
  - Indians: 1.6%
  - Others: 5.3%

GDP (Nominal, 2024)
  - Capital city: ₾43.0 billion (€14.1 billion) · 1st
  - Per capita: ₾32,313 (€10,600) · 1st
- Time zone: UTC+04:00 (GET)
- Area code: +995 32
- ISO 3166 code: GE-TB
- HDI (2023): 0.876
- Website: tbilisi.gov.ge

Tbilisi (/təbɪˈliːsi, təˈbɪlɪsi/ tə-bil-EE-see, tə-BIL-iss-ee) (Note: Georgian: თბილისი, pronounced [ˈtʰbilisi]) is the capital and largest city of Georgia, located on the banks of the Kura River. With more than 1.3 million inhabitants, it contains almost one third of the country's population. Tbilisi was founded in the 5th century CE by Vakhtang I of Iberia and has since served as the capital of various Georgian kingdoms and republics. Between 1801 and 1917, then part of the Russian Empire, it was the seat of the Caucasus Viceroyalty, governing both the northern and southern sides of the Caucasus.

Because of its location at the crossroads between Europe and Asia, and its proximity to the lucrative Silk Road, throughout history, Tbilisi has been a point of contention among various global powers. To this day, the city's location ensures its position as an important transit route for energy and trade projects. Tbilisi's history is reflected in its architecture, which is a mix of medieval, neoclassical, Beaux Arts, Art Nouveau, Stalinist, and Modern structures.

Historically, Tbilisi has been home to people of diverse cultural, ethnic, and religious backgrounds, though its population is overwhelmingly Eastern Orthodox Christian. Notable tourist destinations include the Sameba and Sioni cathedrals, Freedom Square, Rustaveli Avenue and Aghmashenebeli Avenue, medieval Narikala Fortress, the pseudo-Moorish Opera Theater, and the Georgian National Museum. The climate in Tbilisi mostly ranges from 20 to 32 °C (68 to 90 °F) in summer and −1 to 7 °C (30 to 45 °F) in winter.

== Names and etymology ==
The name "Tbilisi" derives from Old Georgian Tbilisi (Asomtavruli: ႧႡႨႪႨႱႨ, Mkhedruli: თბილისი), and further from tpili (Modern Georgian: თბილი, warm, itself from Old Georgian: ႲႴႨႪႨ ṭpili). The name Tbilisi (the place of warmth) was therefore given to the city because of the area's numerous sulfuric hot springs.

Until 1936, the name of the city in English and most other languages followed the Persian pronunciation Tiflis, while the Georgian name was ტფილისი (Ṭpilisi). In some languages it is still known by its pre-1936 name Tiflis (Note: Tbilisi is known by its former name Tiflis in a number of major languages, notably in Spanish, Persian, German, Turkish and others. Pre-1936 Russian sources use Tiflis as well) (/ˈtɪflɪs/ TIF-liss)

On 17 August 1936, by order of the Soviet leadership, the official Russian names of various cities were changed to more closely match the local language. In addition, the Georgian-language form Ṭpilisi was modernized on the basis of a proposal by Georgian linguists; the ancient Georgian component ტფილი (ṭpili, 'warm') was replaced by the newer თბილი (tbili). That form was the basis for the new official Russian name (Тбилиси Tbilisi). Most other languages have subsequently adopted the new name form, but some languages, such as Turkish, Persian, Greek, Spanish, and German, have retained a variation of Tiflis.

Some of the traditional names of Tbilisi in other languages of the region have different roots. The Ossetian name Калак (Kalak) derives from the Georgian word ქალაქი (kalaki) meaning simply city. Chechen and Ingush names for the city use a form similar to or the same as their names for the country of Georgia (Гуьржех Gürƶex) as does the historical Kabardian name (Курджы Kwrdžə), while Abkhaz Қарҭ (Ķarţ) is from the Mingrelian ქართი (Karti).

== History ==
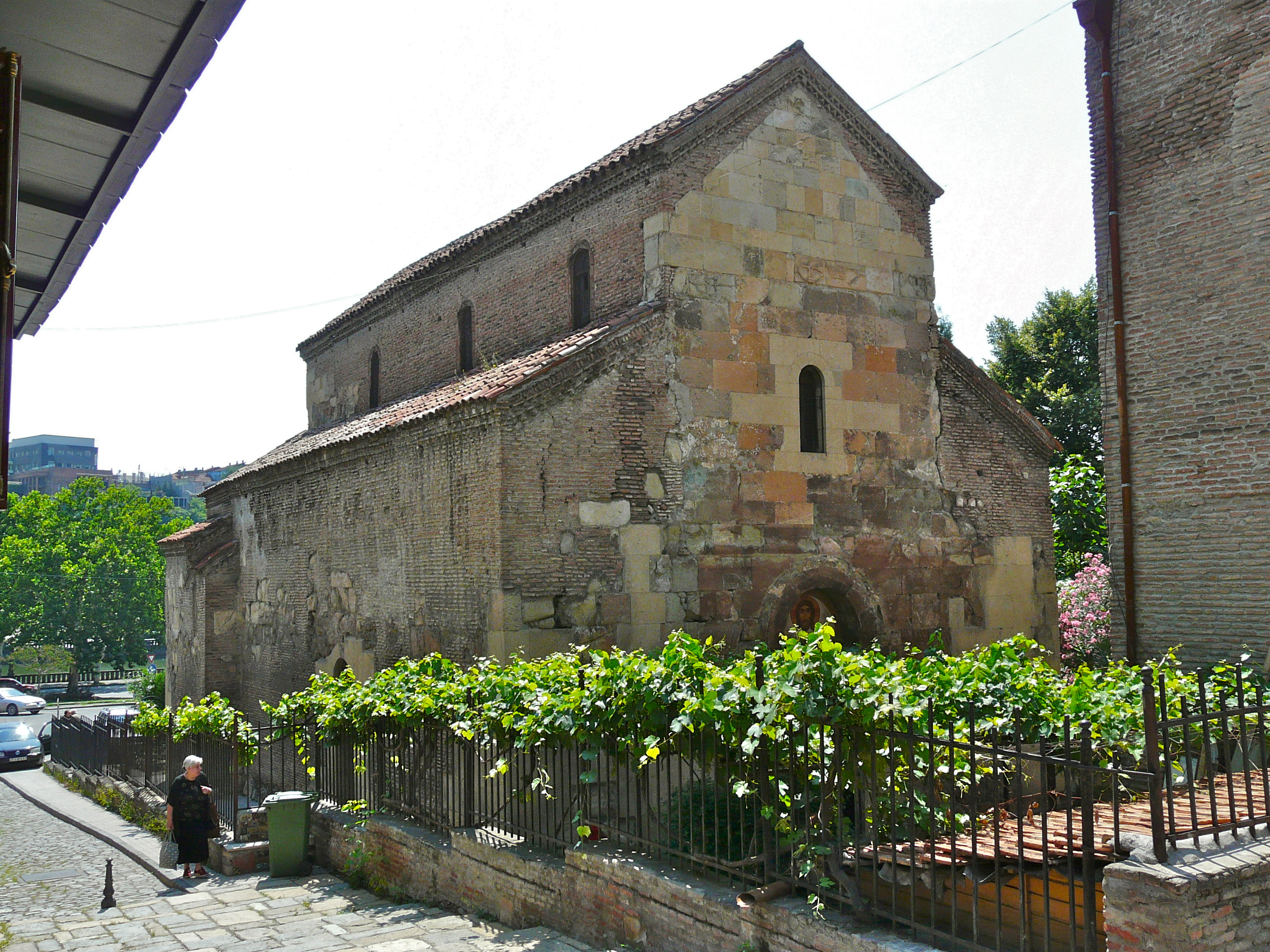
Anchiskhati Basilica, a 6th century monument, is the oldest surviving church in Tbilisi

=== Early history ===
Archaeologists discovered evidence of continuous habitation of the Tbilisi suburb of Dighomi since the early Bronze Age, and stone artifacts dating to the Paleolithic age.

During the late Bronze Age to early Iron Age, it was the largest settlement in the Caucasus. According to legend, the present-day territory of Tbilisi was covered by forests as late as 458. One widely accepted variant of the Tbilisi foundation myth states that King Vakhtang I of Iberia (r. c. 447/49 – 502/22) went hunting in the heavily wooded region with a falcon (sometimes the falcon is replaced with either a hawk or other small birds of prey in the legend). The king's falcon allegedly caught or injured a pheasant during the hunt, after which both birds fell into a nearby hot spring and died from burns. King Vakhtang became so impressed with the hot springs that he decided to clear the forest and build a city on the location.

King Dachi of Iberia (r. 522–534), the successor of Vakhtang I, moved the capital of Iberia from Mtskheta to Tbilisi and began construction of the fortress wall that lined the city's new boundaries. From the sixth century, Tbilisi grew at a steady pace due to the region's strategic location along with important trade and travel routes between Europe and Asia.

=== Foreign domination ===
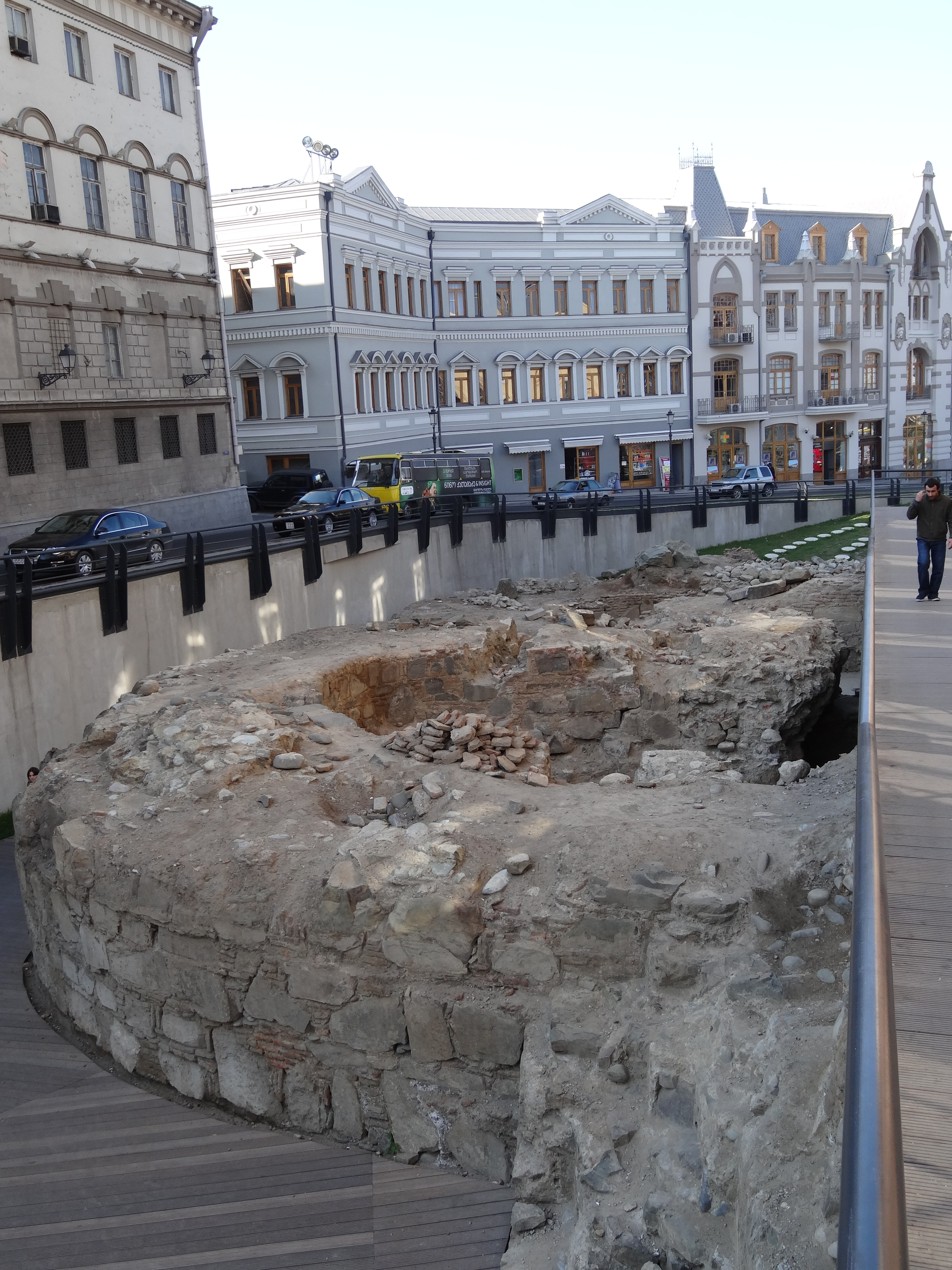
Remnants of ancient city walls discovered in central Tbilisi

Tbilisi's favorable trade location, however, did not necessarily bode well for its survival. Located strategically in the heart of the Caucasus between Europe and Asia, Tbilisi became an object of rivalry among the region's various powers such as the Roman Empire, Parthia, Sassanid Persia, Muslim Arabs, the Byzantine Empire, and the Seljuk Turks. The cultural development of the city was somewhat dependent on who ruled the city at various times, although Tbilisi was fairly cosmopolitan.

From 570 to 580, the Persians ruled the city until 627, when Tbilisi was sacked by the Byzantine/Khazar armies and later, in 736–738, Arab armies entered the town under Marwan II. After this point, the Arabs established an emirate centered in Tbilisi. Arabic dirhams were brought to Georgia following the Arab conquest in the seventh century, and a mint was founded in Tbilisi that produced coins with inscriptions in both Arabic and Georgian. In 764, Tbilisi – still under Arab control – was once again sacked by the Khazars. In 852, the armies of Arab leader Bugha Al-Turki invaded Tbilisi in order to enforce its return to Abbasid allegiance. The Arab domination of Tbilisi continued until about 1050. In 1065, the Seljuk Sultan Alp Arslan campaigned against the Kingdom of Georgia, subjugated Tbilisi, and built a mosque in the city.

=== Capital of Georgia ===
In 1121, after the Battle of Didgori against the Seljuks, the troops of King David IV besieged Tbilisi, taking it in 1122. David moved his residence from Kutaisi to Tbilisi, making it the capital of a unified Georgian State, thus inaugurating the Georgian Golden Age. From the 12–13th centuries, Tbilisi became a regional power with a thriving economy and astonishing cultural output. By the end of the 12th century, the population of Tbilisi had reached 100,000. The city also became an important literary and cultural center, not only for Georgia, but also for the Eastern Orthodox world of the time. During Queen Tamar's reign, Shota Rustaveli worked in Tbilisi while writing his legendary epic poem The Knight in the Panther's Skin. This period is often referred to as "Georgia's Golden Age" or the Georgian Renaissance.

=== Mongol domination and other instability ===
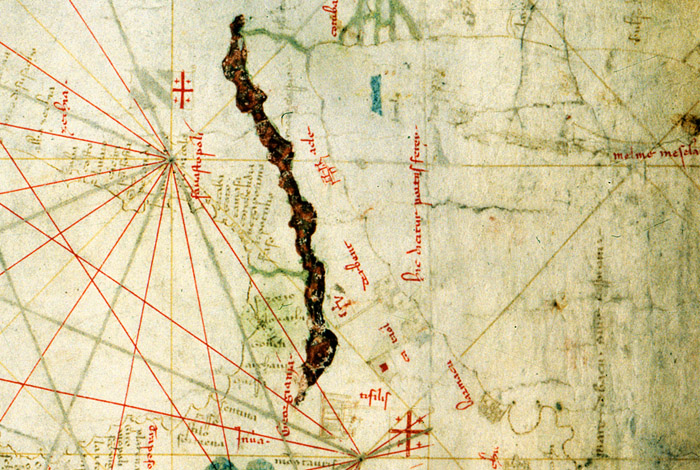
Detail from the Nautical chart by Angelino Dulcert, depicting Georgian Black Sea coast and Tiflis, 1339

Tbilisi's "Golden Age" did not last for more than a century. In 1226, Tbilisi was captured by the Khwarezmian Empire under Shah Jalal al-Din, who massacred tens of thousands of Christians. The Khwarezmian occupation left Tbilisi's defenses severely devastated and prone to further attacks by Mongol armies. In 1236, after suffering crushing Mongol defeats, Georgia submitted to Mongol domination. The nation itself maintained a form of "semi-independence" and did not lose its statehood, but Tbilisi would be strongly influenced by the Mongols for the next century, both politically and culturally. In the 1320s, the Mongols retreated from Georgia, and Tbilisi became the capital of an independent Georgian state, once again. However, an outbreak of the Black Death struck the city in 1366.

Between the late 14th century and the late 18th century, Tbilisi would again be under the rule of various foreign powers. On several occasions, the city would even be completely burned and razed to the ground. On 22 November 1386, Tbilisi was sacked by the armies of Timur. Timur invaded the Kingdom of Georgia seven more times. In 1440, the city was invaded and looted by Jahan Shah of the Qara Qoyunlu. From 1477 to 1478, the city was held by the Aq Qoyunlu tribesmen of Uzun Hassan.

=== Iranian and Ottoman control ===
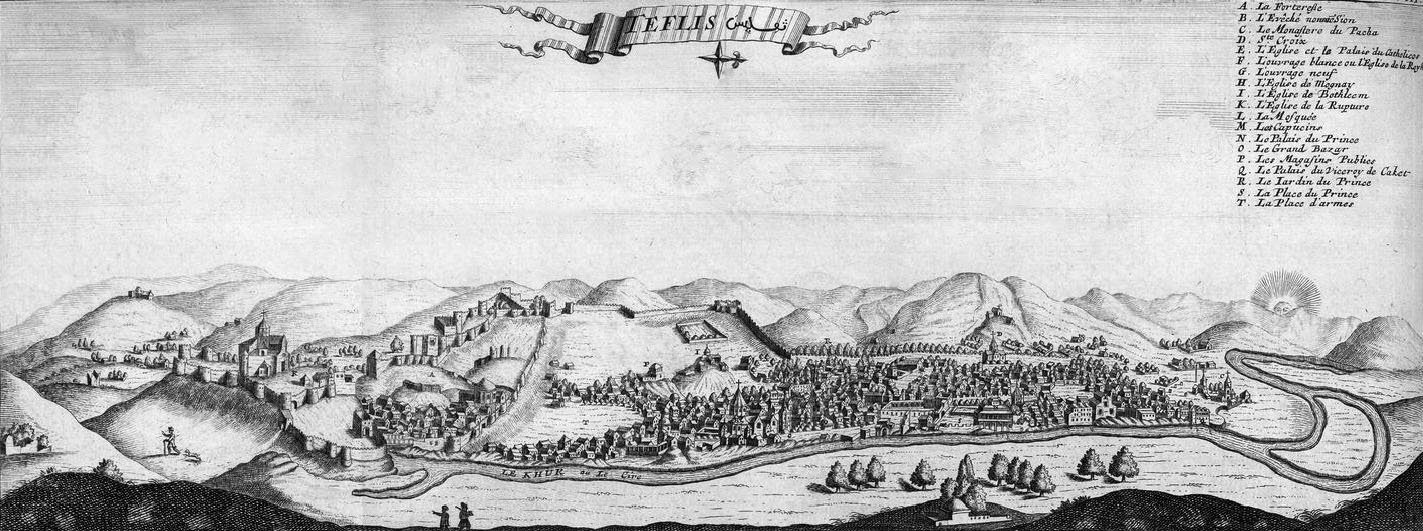
Tbilisi according to French traveler Jean Chardin, 1671

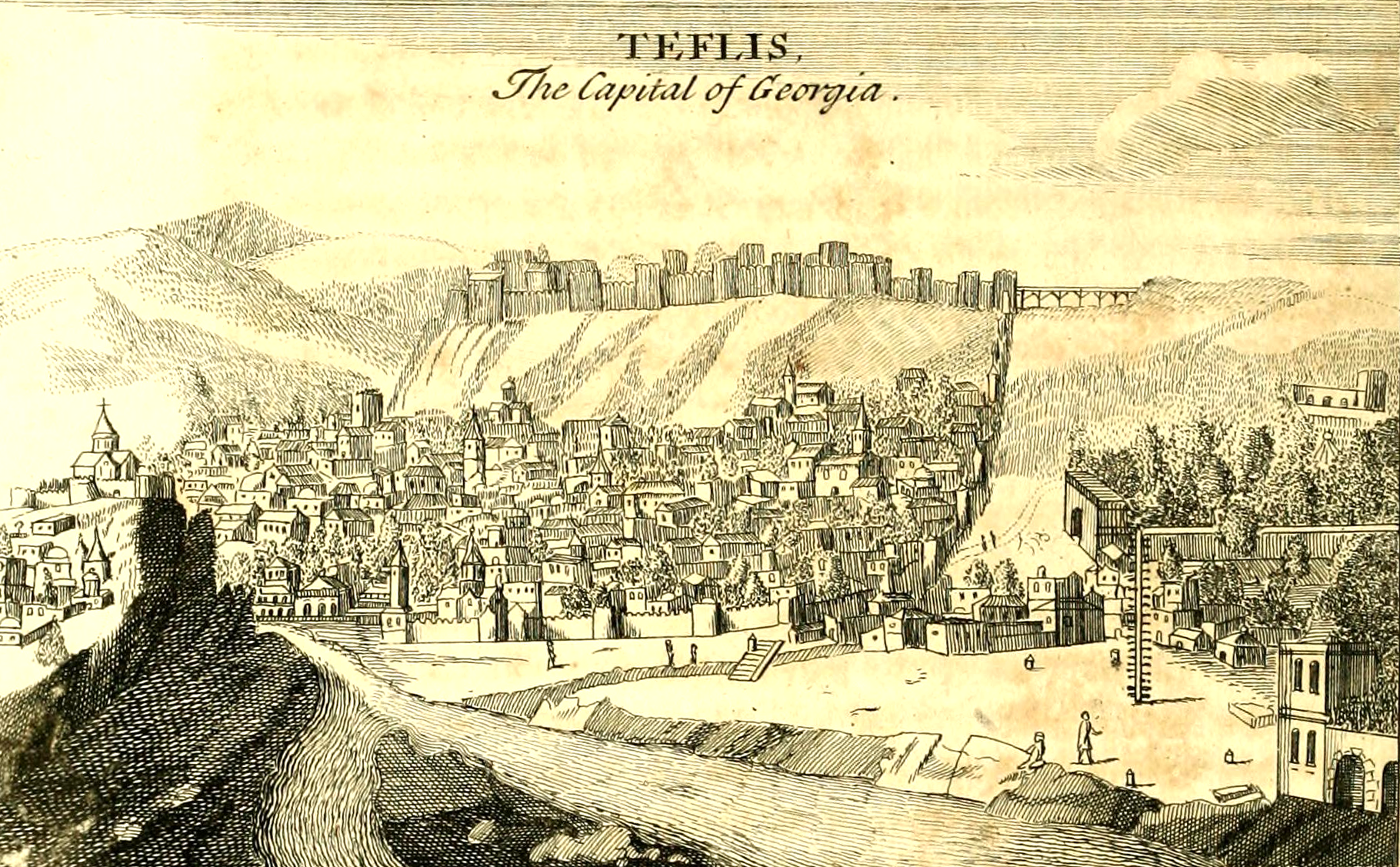
A 1717 illustration of Tbilisi by Joseph Pitton de Tournefort. Metekhi Church seen to the left.

As early as the 1510s, Tbilisi (and the kingdoms of Kartli and Kakheti) were made vassal territories of Safavid Iran. In 1522, Tbilisi was garrisoned for the first time by a large Safavid force. Following the death of king (shah) Ismail I (r. 1501–1524), king David X of Kartli expelled the Iranians. During this period, many parts of Tbilisi were reconstructed and rebuilt. The four campaigns of the king Tahmasp I (r. 1524–1576) resulted in the reoccupation of Kartli and Kakheti, and a Safavid force was permanently stationed in Tbilisi from 1551 onwards, reinforced with the 1555 Treaty of Amasya.

Tbilisi was captured by the Ottomans in 21-24 August 1578, under Osman Pasha and Mustafa Pasha, following the departure of David XI ("Daud Khan") from the city, during the Ottoman–Safavid War (1578–1590). It would remain under Ottoman control for the next 40 years.

From 1614 to 1747, with brief intermissions, Tbilisi was an important city under Iranian rule, and it functioned as a seat of the Iranian vassal kings of Kartli whom the shah conferred with the title of vali. In 1718, the Venetian senate implored the Safavid emperor Soltan Hoseyn to protect the Catholic Armenians and Capuchin missionaries in Tbilisi from the Gregorian Armenians. Under the later rules of Teimuraz II and Heraclius II, Tbilisi became a vibrant political and cultural center free of foreign rule—but, fearful of the constant threat of invasion, Georgia's rulers sought Russian protection in the 1783 Treaty of Georgievsk. Despite this agreement, the city was captured and devastated in 1795 by the Iranian Qajar ruler Agha Mohammad Khan.

=== Russian control ===
The coat of arms of the Tiflis Governorate

In 1801, the Russian Empire annexed the Georgian Kingdom of Kartli-Kakheti, of which Tbilisi was one of the most significant urban centers. Within Tsarist Russia, Tbilisi (known then as Tiflis) was included within the Tiflis Uyezd county in 1801, part of what was initially the Georgia Governorate. Following the establishment of the Tiflis Governorate (Gubernia) in 1846, Tbilisi became its capital. Russian Imperial administrators implemented a new Western-style city plan and commissioned new buildings and infrastructure, including roads and railroads connecting Tbilisi to other important cities in the Russian Empire, such as Batumi and Poti. By the 1850s, Tbilisi once again emerged as a major trade and cultural center, with many foreign, including Western European, entrepreneurs operating.

The likes of Ilia Chavchavadze, Akaki Tsereteli, Mirza Fatali Akhundzade, Iakob Gogebashvili, Alexander Griboyedov and many other statesmen, poets and artists all found their home in Tbilisi. The city was visited on numerous occasions by and was the object of affection of Alexander Pushkin, Leo Tolstoy, Mikhail Lermontov, the Romanov family and others. The main new artery built under Russian administration was Golovin Avenue (present-day Rustaveli Avenue), on which the Viceroys of the Caucasus established their residence. For much of the early 19th century, Tbilisi's largest ethnic group was Armenian, at some point forming 74.3% of the population.

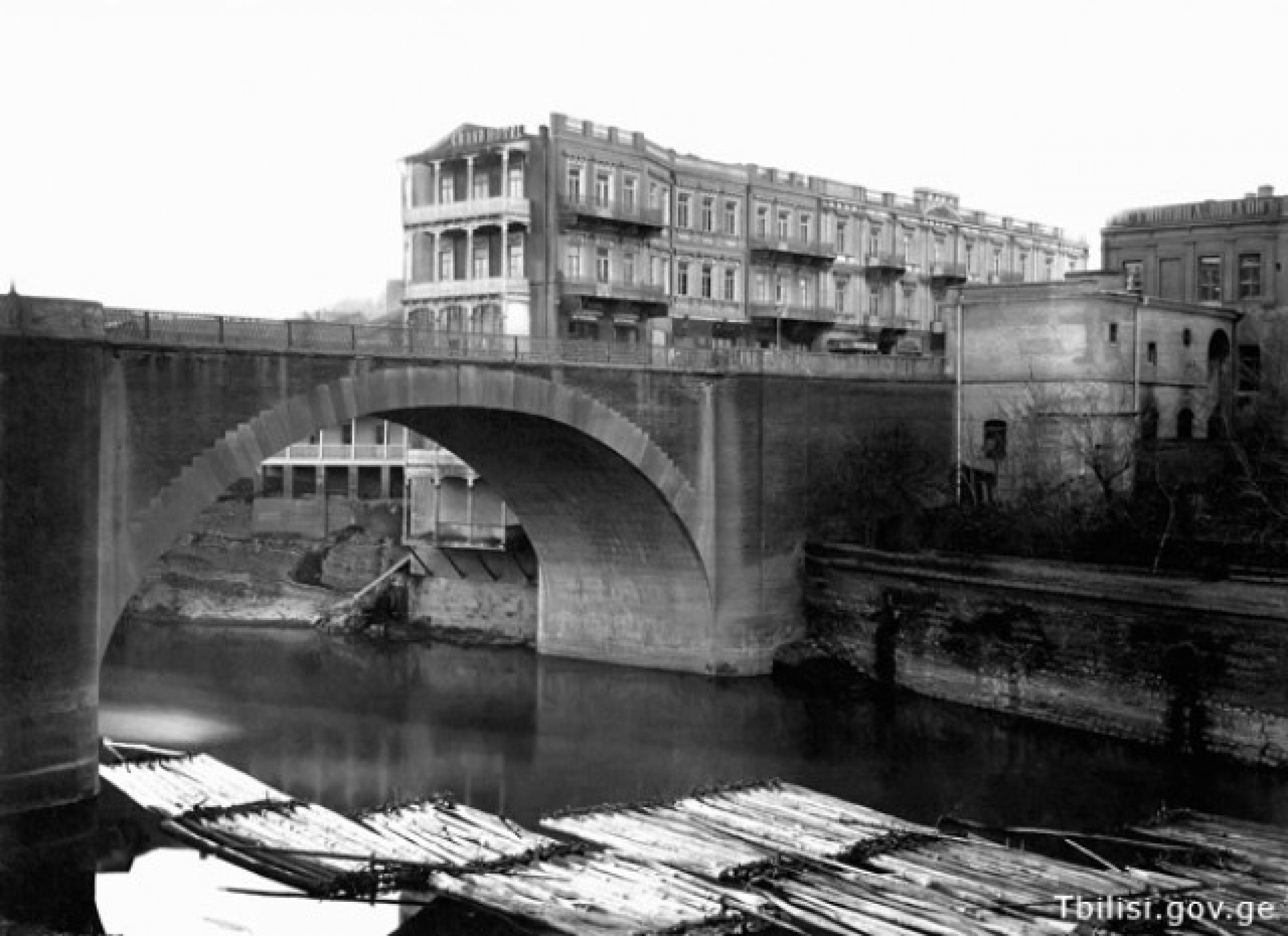
"Dry Bridge", constructed by Italian architect Antonio Scudieri

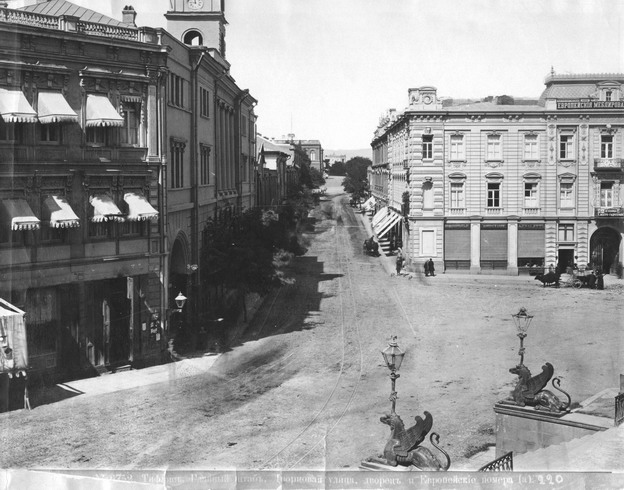
View on Golovin Avenue as seen from the site of present-day Freedom Square

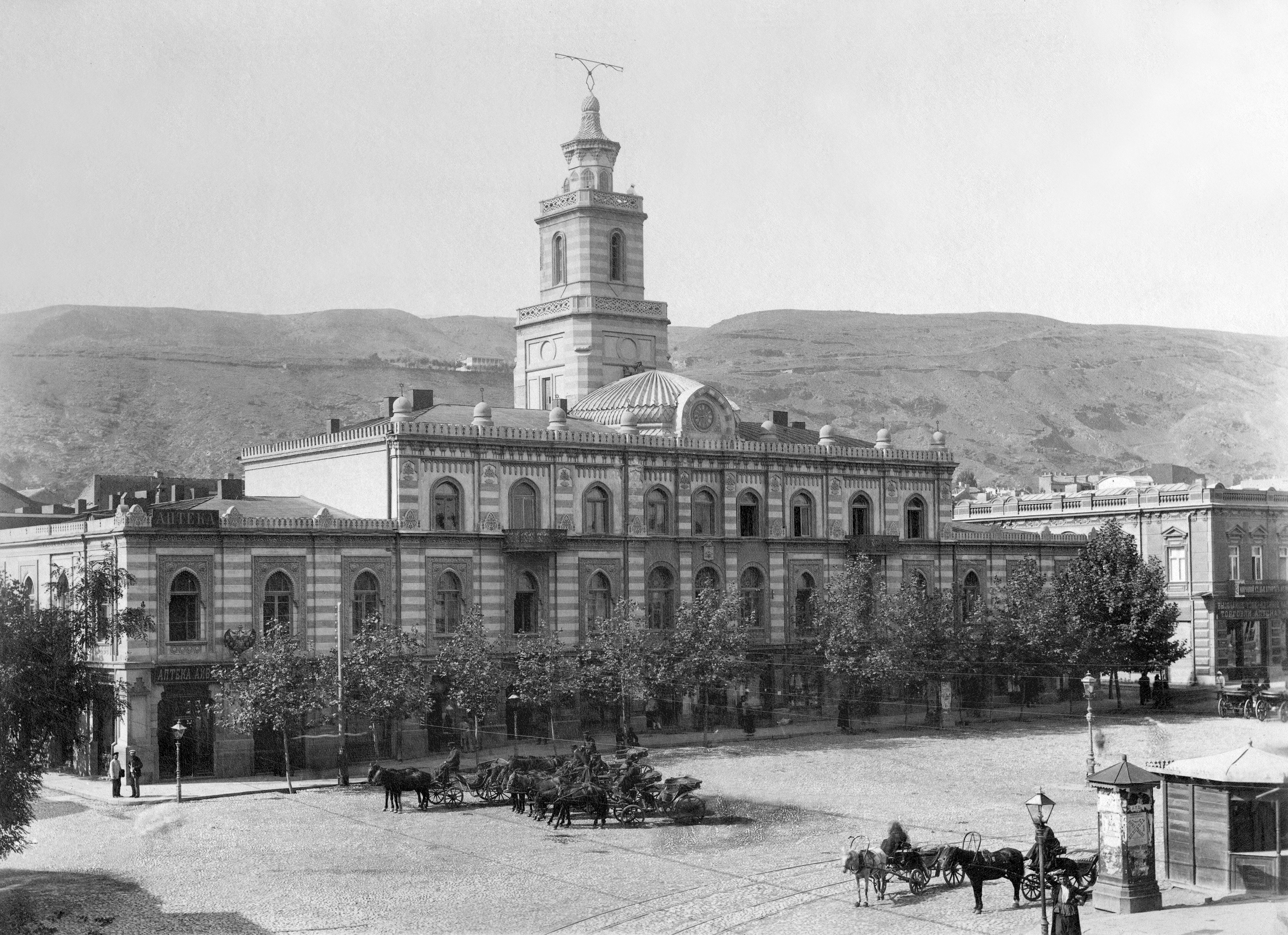
Building of the Tbilisi City Hall

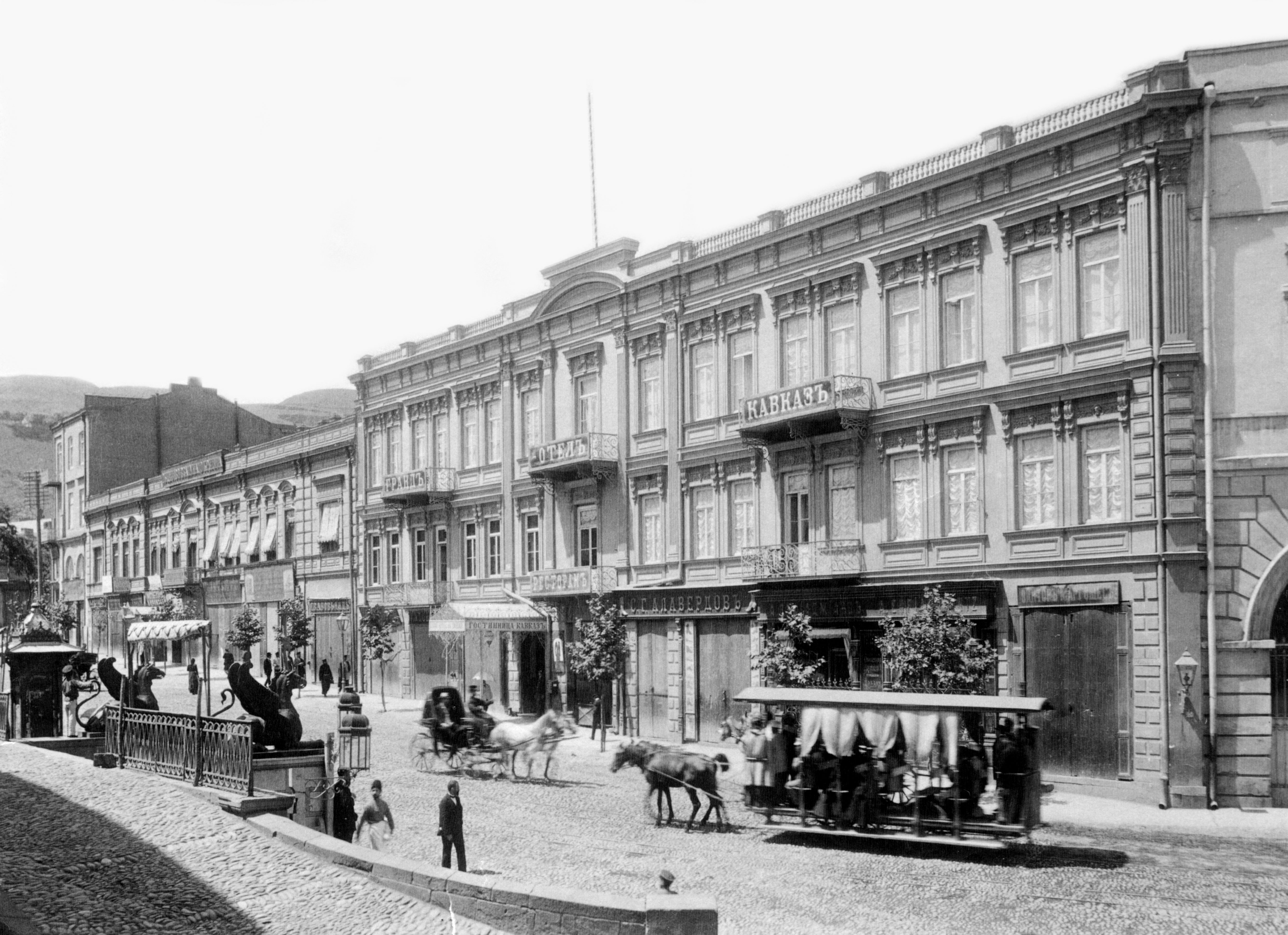
Grand Hotel "Kavkaz" in central Tbilisi, c 1900

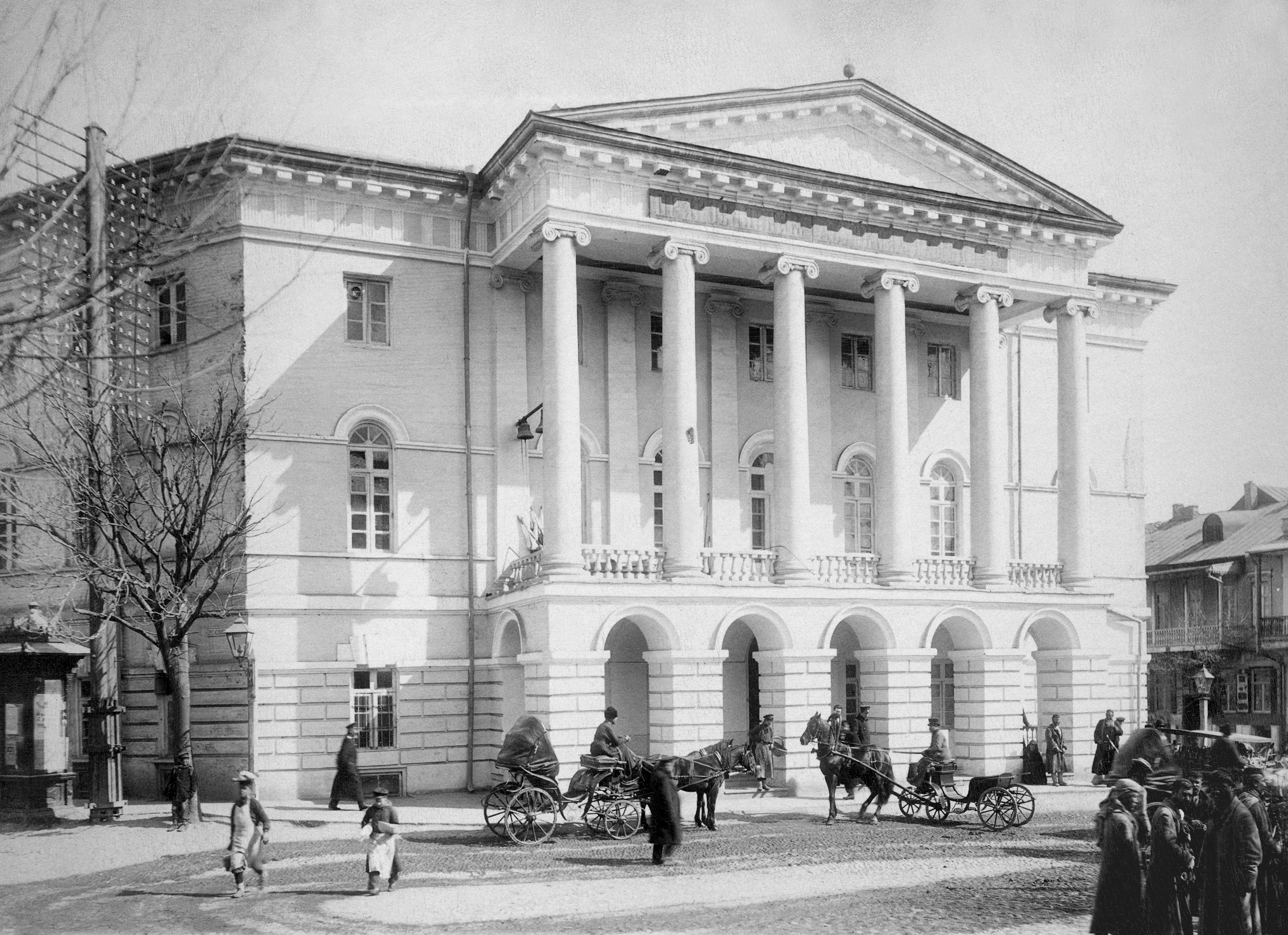
Building of the Art Museum of Georgia, built at the end of the 1830s, photo ca. 1900

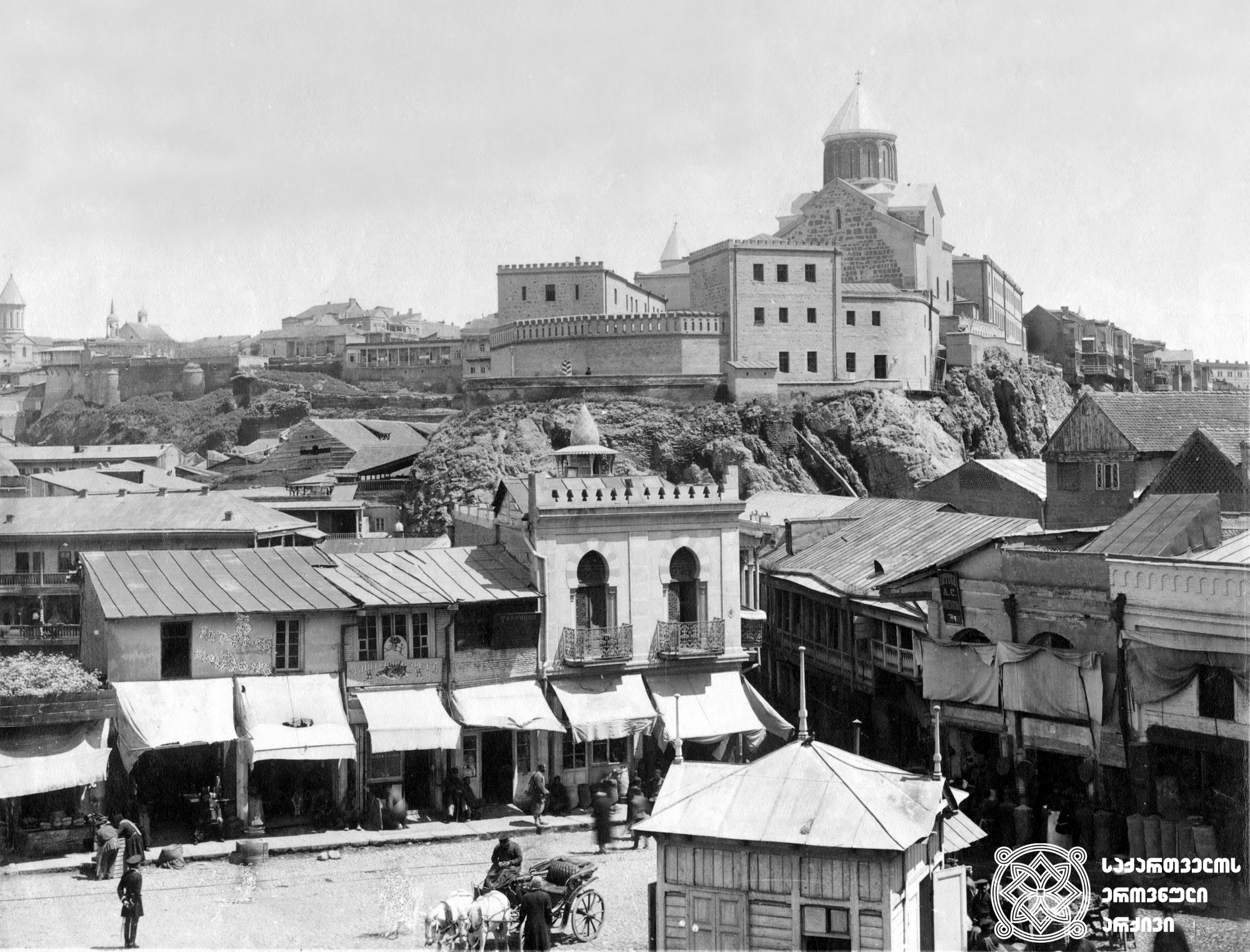
Tatar bazaar and with the Metekhi Orthodox church seen on the cliff

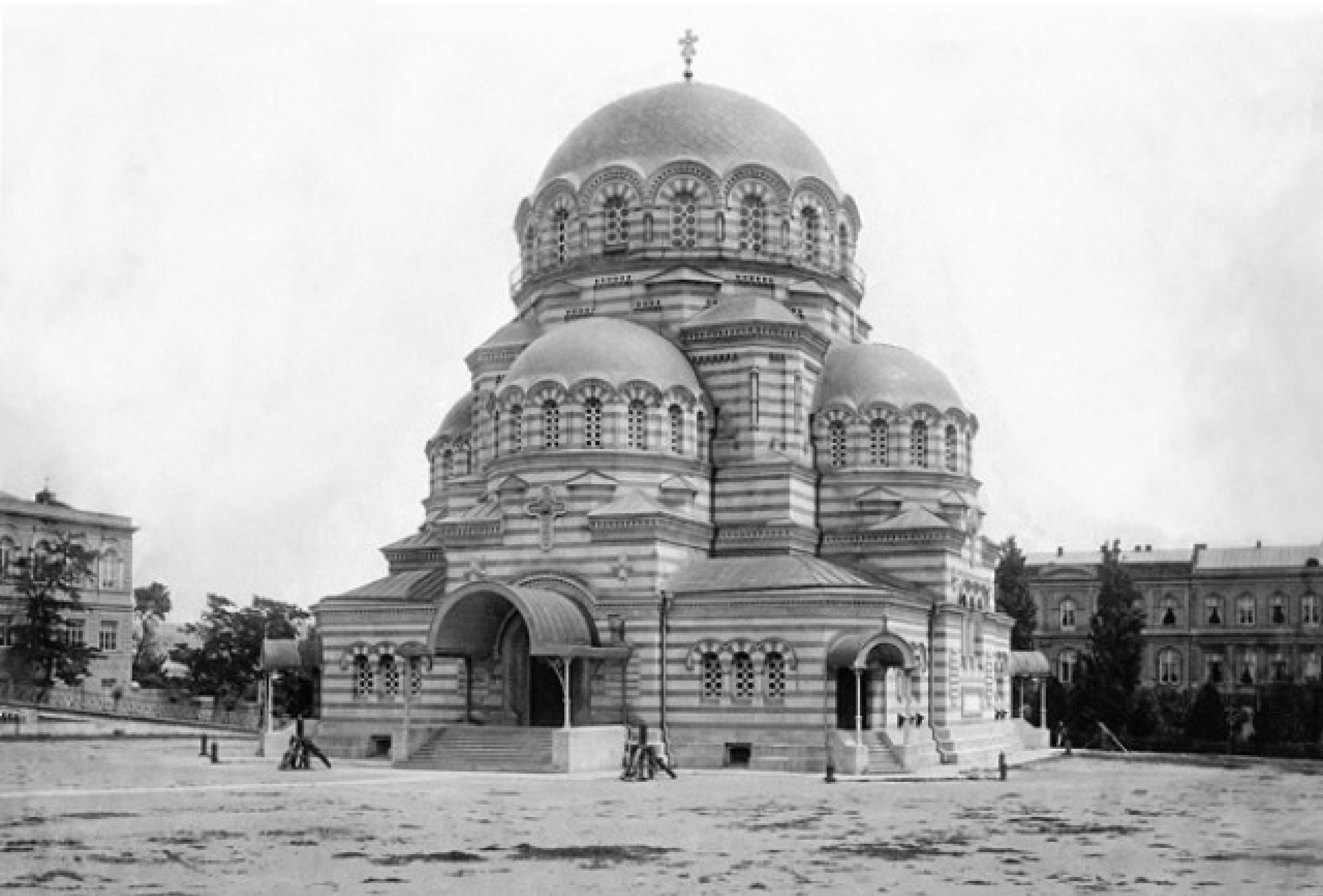
Alexander Nevsky Cathedral, demolished by the Soviets to make way for the present Parliament building

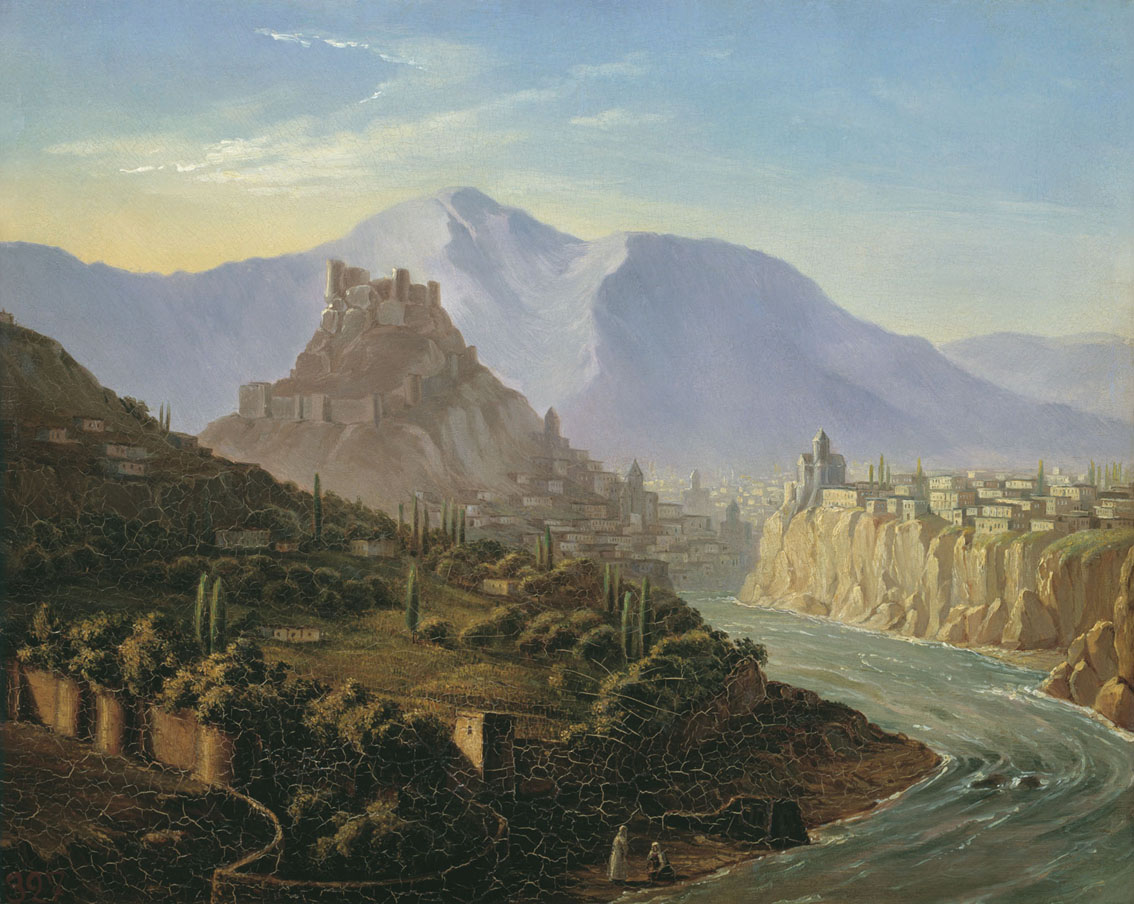
Tiflis by Mikhail Lermontov, 1837

=== Brief independence ===
After the Russian Revolution of 1917, the city served as a location of the Transcaucasus interim government which established, in the spring of 1918, the short-lived independent Transcaucasian Federation with the capital in Tbilisi. At this time, Tbilisi had roughly the same number of Armenians as Georgians, with Russians being the third largest ethnic group. It was in the former Viceroy of the Caucasus's palace where the independence of three Transcaucasus nations – Georgia, Armenia and Azerbaijan – was declared by their respective national councils on 26 to 28 May 1918. After this, Tbilisi functioned as the capital of the Democratic Republic of Georgia until 25 February 1921. From 1918 to 1919, the city also consecutively served as the headquarters of the country's German garrison and later the British 27th Division; Tbilisi was also the main office of the British Chief Commissioner in Transcaucasia, Oliver Wardrop and the High Commissioner to Armenia, Colonel William N. Haskell.

Under the national government, Tbilisi turned into the first Caucasian University City after the Tbilisi State University was founded in 1918. On 25 February 1921, the Bolshevist Russian 11th Red Army invaded Tbilisi and after bitter fighting at the outskirts of the city, declared Soviet rule.

=== Soviet rule ===
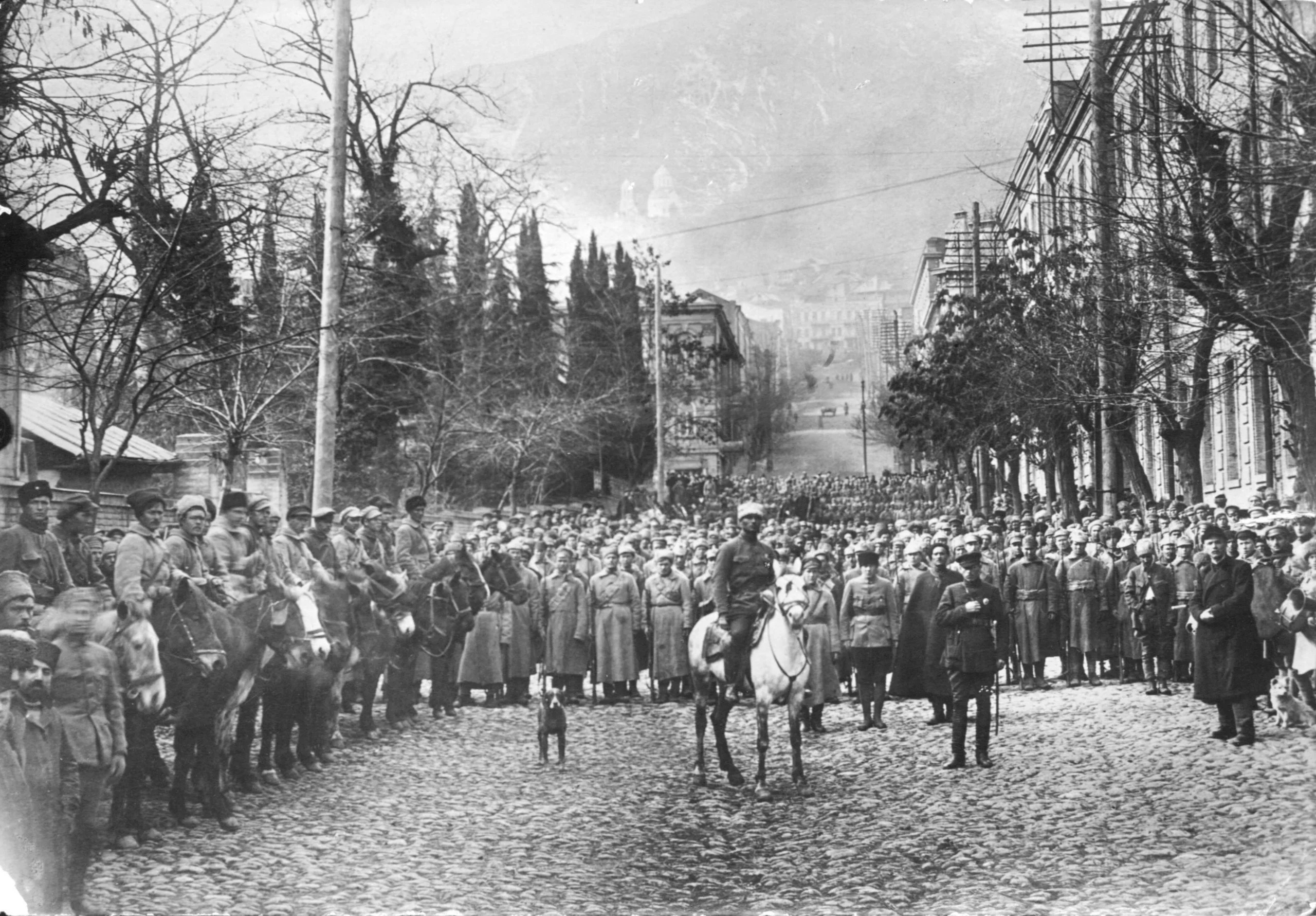
The Red Army entered Tbilisi on 25 February 1921

In 1921, the Democratic Republic of Georgia was occupied by the Soviet Bolshevik forces from Russia, and until 1936, Tbilisi functioned first as the capital city of the Transcaucasian SFSR (which included Armenia, Azerbaijan, and Georgia), and afterward until 1991 as the capital of the Georgian Soviet Socialist Republic. During Soviet rule, Tbilisi's population grew significantly, the city became more industrialized, and it also came to be an important political, social, and cultural centre of the Soviet Union. In 1980, the city hosted the first state-sanctioned rock festival in the USSR. As a major tourist destination for both Soviet citizens and foreign visitors, Tbilisi's "Old Town" (the neighborhoods within the original city walls) was reconstructed in the 1970s and 1980s.

Tbilisi witnessed mass anti-Russian demonstrations during 1956 in the 9 March Massacre, in protest against the anti-Stalin policies of Nikita Khrushchev. Peaceful protests occurred in 1978, and in 1989 the April 9 tragedy was a peaceful protest that turned violent.

=== Post-independence ===
Since the break-up of the Soviet Union, Tbilisi has experienced periods of significant instability and turmoil. After a brief civil war, which the city endured for two weeks from December 1991 to January 1992 (when pro-Gamsakhurdia and Opposition forces clashed), Tbilisi became the scene of frequent armed confrontations among various mafia clans and illegal business operators. During the Shevardnadze Era (1992–2003), crime and corruption were rampant. Many segments of society became impoverished because of unemployment caused by the crumbling economy. Average citizens of Tbilisi started to become increasingly disillusioned with the existing quality of life in the city (and in the nation in general). Mass protests took place in November 2003 after falsified parliamentary elections forced more than 100,000 people into the streets and concluded with the Rose Revolution. Since 2003, Tbilisi has experienced considerably more stability with decreasing crime rates, an improved economy, and a real estate boom. During the 2008 South Ossetia war, the Tbilisi area was hit by multiple Russian air attacks.

After the war, several large-scale projects were started, including a streetcar system, a railway bypass and a relocation of the central station, and new urban highways. In June 2015, a flood killed at least twenty people and caused animals from the city's zoo to be released into the streets.

== Politics and administration ==
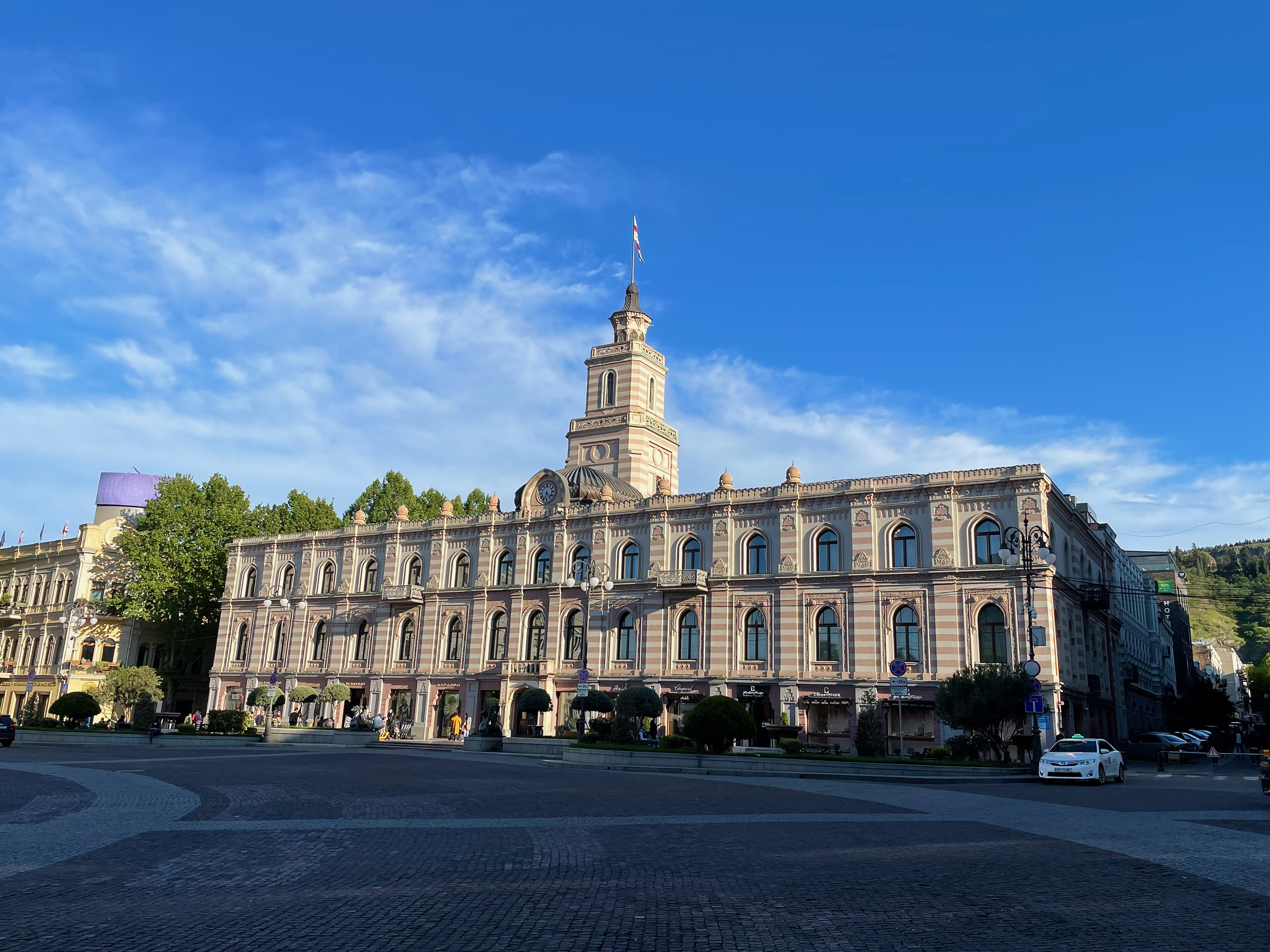
City Council building overlooking Freedom Square

The status of Tbilisi, as the nation's capital, is defined by Article 10 of the Constitution of Georgia (1995) and the Law on Georgia's Capital – Tbilisi (20 February 1998).

Tbilisi is governed by the Tbilisi City Assembly (Sakrebulo) and the Tbilisi City Hall (Meria). The City Assembly and mayor are elected once every four years by direct elections. The Mayor of Tbilisi is Kakha Kaladze and the Chairman of the Tbilisi city Assembly is Giorgi Alibegashvili.

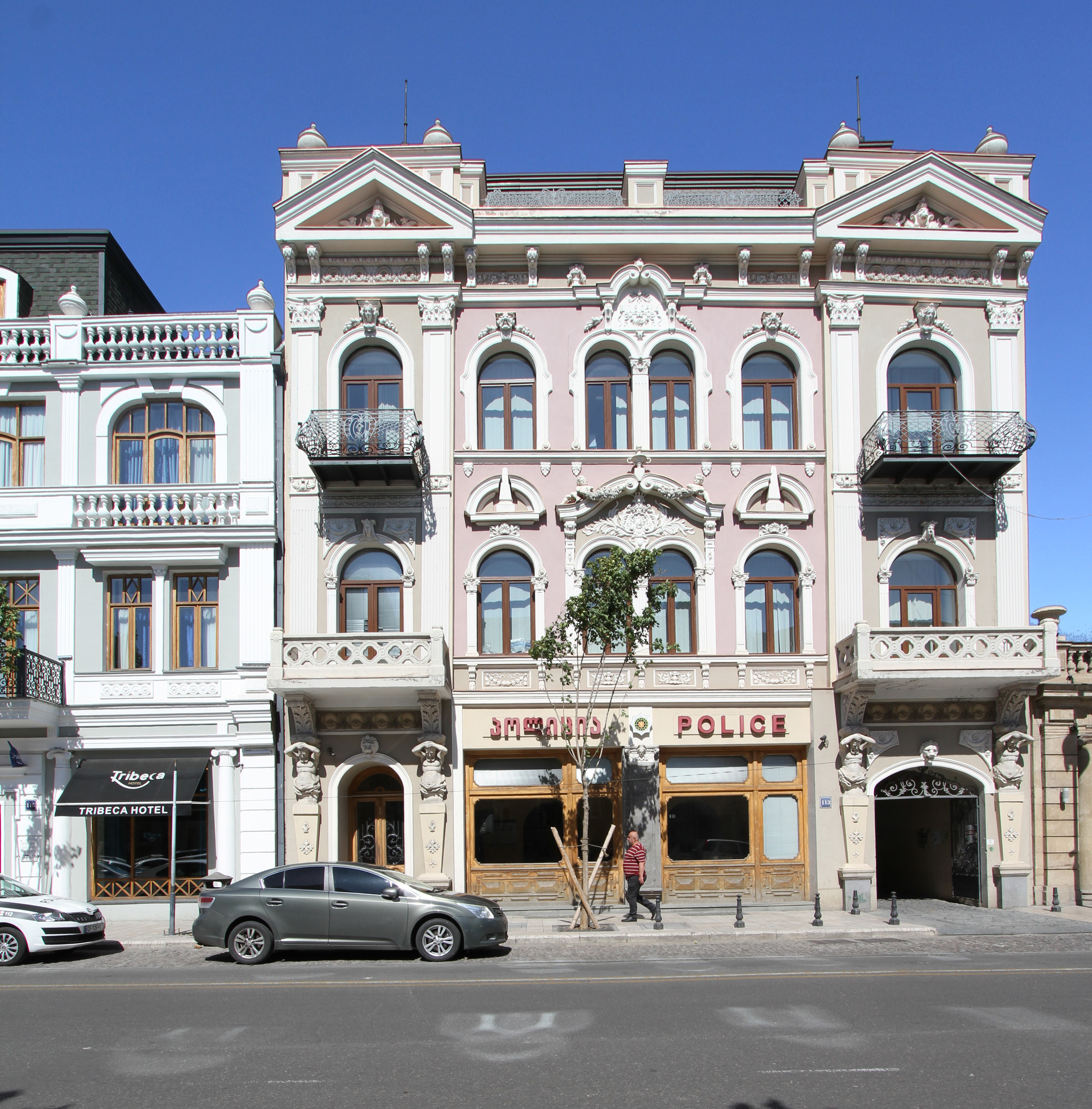
A police station on Agmashenebeli Avenue

Administratively, the city is divided into raions (districts), which have their own units of central and local government with jurisdiction over a limited scope of affairs. This subdivision was established under Soviet rule in the 1930s, following the general subdivision of the Soviet Union. After Georgia regained independence, the raion system was modified and reshuffled. According to the latest revision, Tbilisi raions include:

- Mtatsminda District, including neighborhoods: Mtatsminda, Sololaki, Vera, Kiketi, Kojori, Shindisi, Tsavkisi, Tabakhmela, Okrokana
- Vake District, including neighborhoods: Vake, Bagebi, Upper Saburtalo, Nutsubidze Plateau, Tskneti
- Saburtalo District, including neighborhoods: Lower Saburtalo, Vedzisi, Lisi, Vashlijvari, Didi Dighomi, Patara Dighomi, Zurgovana
- Krtsanisi District, including neighborhoods: Krtsanisi, Abanotubani, Kala, Ortachala, Ponichala
- Isani District, including neighborhoods: Avlabari, Isani, Navtlughi, Metromsheni, Vazisubani, Elia
- Samgori District, including neighborhoods: Varketili, Orkhevi, Dampalo, Lilo, Airport Settlement, Navtlughi-2, Africa, Zeemka
- Chughureti District, including neighborhoods: Chughureti, Ivertubani, Kukia, Svanetisubani
- Didube District, including neighborhoods: Didube, Dighomi Massive
- Nadzaladevi District, including neighborhoods: Nadzaladevi, Sanzona, Temka, Lotkini
- Gldani District, including neighborhoods: Gldani, Avchala, Mukhiani, Gldanula, Zahesi

Overview of Tbilisi districts
District Name	Population (2017)	Area ( Km^{2})
Mtatsminda District	49,052	73
Vake District	111,903	61.7
Saburtalo District	138,493	75.5
Krtsanisi District	39,286	31.7
Isani District	125,610	16.7
Samgori District	177,844	128.4
Chughureti District	65,230	14.3
Didube District	70,018	8.4
Nadzaladevi District	154,067	42
Gldani District	177,214	50.3
City of Tbilisi	1,108,717	502
Source: Geostat, Tbilisi City Hall

Most of the raions are named after historic quarters of the city. The citizens of Tbilisi widely recognize an informal system of smaller historic neighborhoods. Such neighborhoods are several, however, constituting a kind of hierarchy, because most of them have lost their distinctive topographic limits. The natural first level of subdivision of the city is into the right and left banks of the Mtkvari river.

The names of the oldest neighborhoods go back to the early Middle Ages and sometimes pose a great linguistic interest. The newest whole-built developments bear chiefly residential marketing names.

In 19th-century Tbilisi, the Georgian quarter was confined to the southeastern part of the city; Baedeker describes the layout succinctly:

In the north part of the town, on the left bank of the Kurá and to the south of the railway station, stretches the clean German Quarter, formerly occupied by German immigrants from Württemberg (1818). To the south is the Gruzinian or Georgian Quarter (Avlabár). On the right bank of the Kurá is the Russian Quarter, the seat of the officials and of the larger business firms. This is adjoined on the south by the Armenian and Persian Bazaars.

— Karl Baedeker, Russia: A Handbook for Travelers

== Geography ==
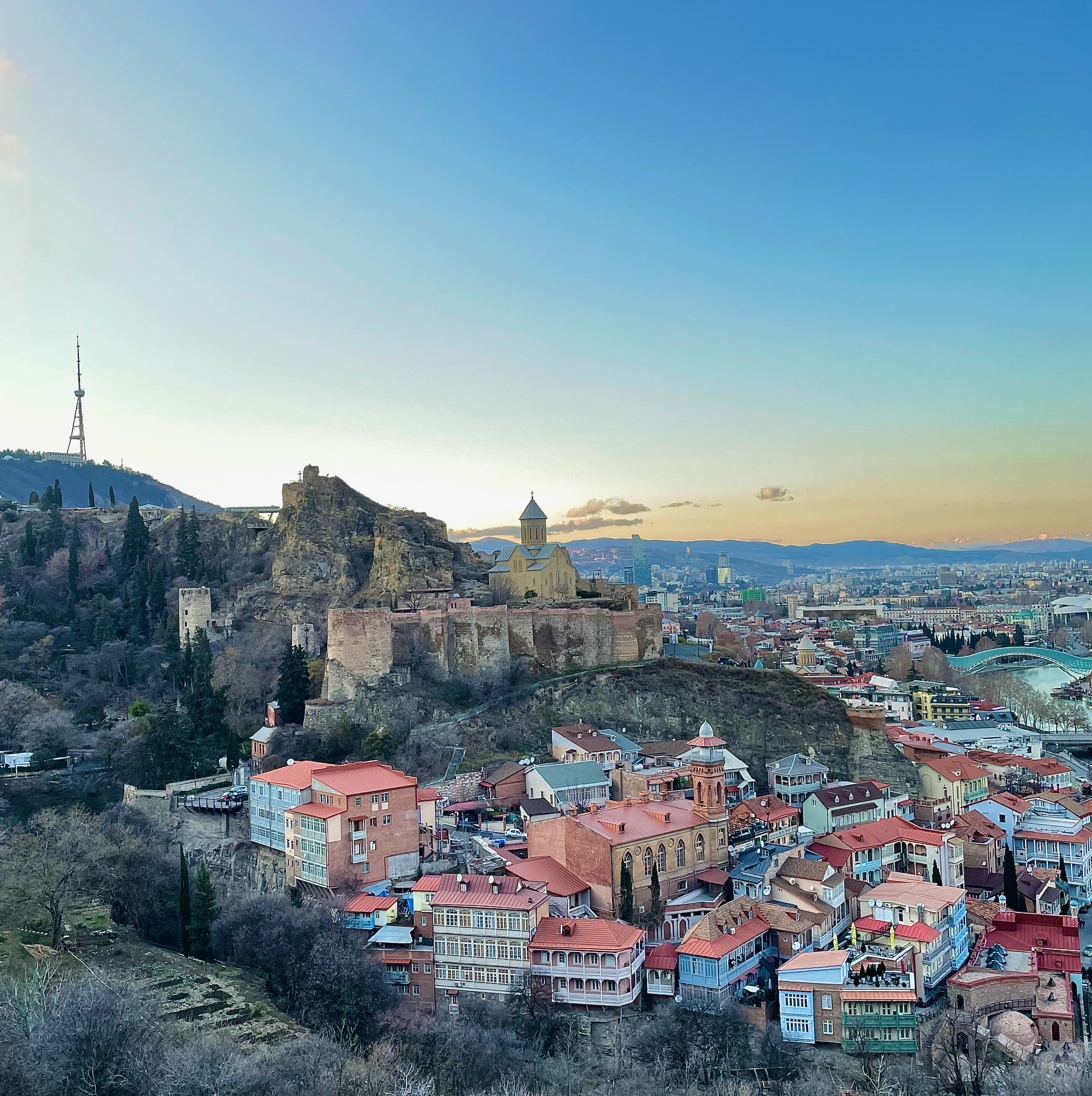
Tbilisi, especially Old Town, has a complex terrain, with hills and cliffs.

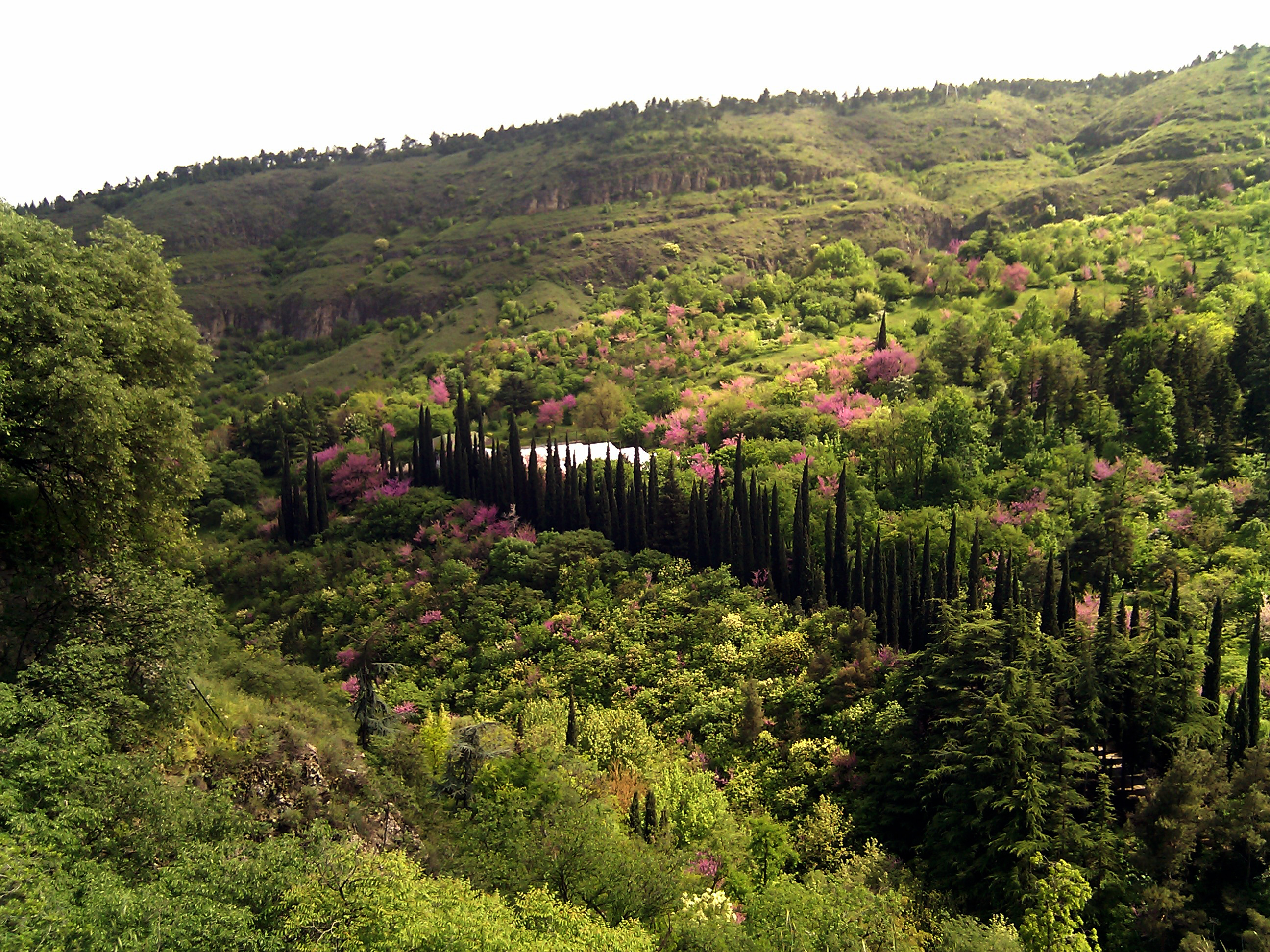
The National Botanical Garden of Georgia in Tbilisi is concealed from view as it resides among the hills of the Sololaki Range.

=== Location ===
Tbilisi is located in the South Caucasus at 41° 43' North and 44° 47' East. The city lies in Eastern Georgia on both banks of the Kura River (locally known as Mtkvari). The elevation of the city ranges from 380–770 metres above sea level (1,250–2,530 ft) and has the shape of an amphitheatre surrounded by mountains on three sides. To the north, Tbilisi is bounded by the Saguramo Range, to the east and south-east by the Iori Plain, to the south and west by various endings (subranges) of the Trialeti Range.

The relief of Tbilisi is complex. The part of the city which lies on the left bank of the Kura River extends for more than 30 km (19 mi) from the Avchala District to River Lochini. The part of the city which lies on the right side of the river, though, is built along the foothills of the Trialeti Range, the slopes of which in many cases descend all the way to the edges of the river. The mountains, therefore, are a significant barrier to urban development on its right bank. This type of a geographic environment creates pockets of very densely developed areas, while other parts of the city are left undeveloped due to the complex topographic relief.

To the north of the city, a large reservoir (commonly known as the Tbilisi Sea) is fed by irrigation canals.

=== Climate ===
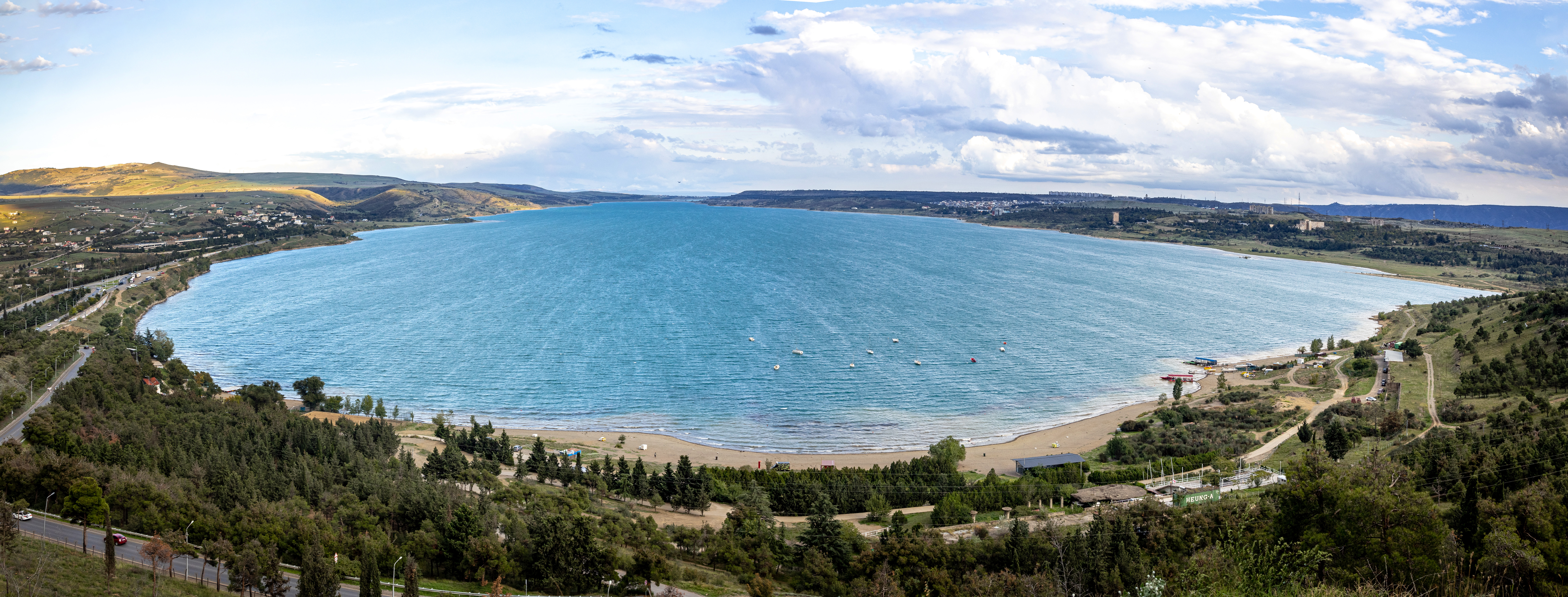
Tbilisi Sea, the city's largest body of water located in the suburbs.

Tbilisi has a humid subtropical climate (Köppen: Cfa, Trewartha: Do) with considerable continental and semi-arid influences. The city experiences hot, humid summers and moderately cold dry winters. Like most other regions of Eastern Georgia, Tbilisi's precipitation maximum occurs in late spring and early summer, with a winter minimum in precipitation and a drought-like nadir in late summer. The city's climate is influenced both by dry (Central Asian/Siberian) air masses from the east and oceanic (Atlantic/Black Sea) air masses from the west. Because the city is bounded on most sides by mountain ranges, the close proximity to large bodies of water (Black and Caspian Seas) and the fact that the Greater Caucasus Mountains Range (further to the north) blocks the intrusion of cold air masses from Russia, Tbilisi has a relatively mild microclimate compared to other cities that possess a similar climate along the same latitudes.

The average annual temperature in Tbilisi is 13.8 °C (56.8 °F). January is the coldest month with an average temperature of 2.7 °C (36.9 °F). July is the hottest month with an average temperature of 25.4 °C (77.7 °F). Daytime high temperatures reach or exceed 32 °C (90 °F) on an average of 22 days during a typical year. The absolute minimum recorded temperature is −24.4 °C (−11.9 °F) in January 1883 and the absolute maximum is 42.0 °C (107.6 °F) on 17 July 1882. Lying in the partial rain shadow of the Trialeti Range and the Abul-Samsari and Likhi Ranges farther to the west, Tbilisi receives about half the precipitation of Western Georgia. The historical average annual precipitation of Tbilisi from 1961-1990 is 632 mm (24.9 in). The average annual precipitation for the most recent period ranging from 2000-2024 was 673 mm (26.5 in). May is the wettest month (averaging 84.0 mm (3.3 in) of precipitation) while January is the driest (averaging 16.4 mm (0.6 in) of precipitation). Snow falls on average 15–25 days per year. Maximum snow depth in the city center never exceeds 40 centimetres (16 in), although snow depths in the adjacent foothills and suburbs can surpass 70 centimetres (28 in). The surrounding mountains often trap the clouds within and around the city, mainly during the Spring and Autumn months, resulting in prolonged rainy and/or cloudy weather. Northwesterly winds dominate in most parts of Tbilisi throughout the year. Southeasterly winds are common as well.

Climate data for Tbilisi (1991–2020 normals, extremes 1881–present)
Month	Jan	Feb	Mar	Apr	May	Jun	Jul	Aug	Sep	Oct	Nov	Dec	Year
Record high °C (°F)	19.5 (67.1)	22.4 (72.3)	29.0 (84.2)	34.4 (93.9)	37.0 (98.6)	38.7 (101.7)	42.0 (107.6)	40.4 (104.7)	37.9 (100.2)	33.3 (91.9)	27.2 (81.0)	22.8 (73.0)	40.5 (104.9)
Mean daily maximum °C (°F)	6.9 (44.4)	8.4 (47.1)	13.2 (55.8)	18.6 (65.5)	23.7 (74.7)	28.5 (83.3)	31.5 (88.7)	31.9 (89.4)	26.2 (79.2)	20.0 (68.0)	12.6 (54.7)	8.1 (46.6)	19.1 (66.5)
Daily mean °C (°F)	2.7 (36.9)	3.8 (38.8)	7.9 (46.2)	12.9 (55.2)	17.8 (64.0)	22.3 (72.1)	25.3 (77.5)	25.4 (77.7)	20.4 (68.7)	14.7 (58.5)	7.9 (46.2)	3.9 (39.0)	13.8 (56.7)
Mean daily minimum °C (°F)	−0.6 (30.9)	0.2 (32.4)	4.0 (39.2)	8.4 (47.1)	13.2 (55.8)	17.3 (63.1)	20.4 (68.7)	20.3 (68.5)	15.9 (60.6)	11.0 (51.8)	4.7 (40.5)	1.2 (34.2)	9.7 (49.4)
Record low °C (°F)	−24.4 (−11.9)	−18.8 (−1.8)	−12.8 (9.0)	−5.0 (23.0)	1.0 (33.8)	2.0 (35.6)	9.3 (48.7)	8.9 (48.0)	3.1 (37.6)	−6.4 (20.5)	−16 (3)	−20.5 (−4.9)	−24.4 (−11.9)
Average precipitation mm (inches)	16.4 (0.65)	18.2 (0.72)	29.1 (1.15)	63.8 (2.51)	82.9 (3.26)	84.0 (3.31)	41.6 (1.64)	39.4 (1.55)	34.8 (1.37)	46.3 (1.82)	34.2 (1.35)	20.8 (0.82)	511.5 (20.15)
Average snowfall cm (inches)	7.1 (2.8)	5.5 (2.2)	7.2 (2.8)	1.3 (0.5)	0.0 (0.0)	0.0 (0.0)	0.0 (0.0)	0.0 (0.0)	0.0 (0.0)	0.6 (0.2)	1.6 (0.6)	2.2 (0.9)	25.5 (10)
Average precipitation days (≥ 1.0 mm)	3.7	4.3	5.1	8.7	10.4	8.3	5.7	4.6	4.9	6.0	5.3	4.4	71.4
Average rainy days	4	4	8	12	12	10	7	8	9	10	10	6	100
Average snowy days	6	8	3	0.1	0	0	0	0	0	0.1	1	4	22
Average relative humidity (%)	75.3	73	68.6	69	69.7	65.6	63.1	63.3	69	76.1	78.4	78.2	70.8
Mean monthly sunshine hours	99	102	142	171	213	249	256	248	206	164	103	93	2,046
Mean daily daylight hours	9.6	10.6	12	13.4	14.5	15.2	14.9	13.8	12.5	11.1	9.8	9.2	12.2
Percentage possible sunshine	34	34	39	43	47	54	55	58	55	48	35	32	45
Average ultraviolet index	1	2	4	5	7	8	7	7	6	4	3	1	4.5
Source 1: Pogoda.ru.net NOAA(humidity, precipitation and days with precip)(Sunshine hours 1961–1990)
Source 2: Weather Atlas(snowfall-daylight), Nomadseaon(daily maximum UV 2022–2023)

Climate data for Tbilisi Airport (1981–2010)
Month	Jan	Feb	Mar	Apr	May	Jun	Jul	Aug	Sep	Oct	Nov	Dec	Year
Record high °C (°F)	16.9 (62.4)	20.8 (69.4)	26.3 (79.3)	34.3 (93.7)	33.1 (91.6)	38.2 (100.8)	39.4 (102.9)	40.2 (104.4)	37.4 (99.3)	32.2 (90.0)	24.7 (76.5)	19.9 (67.8)	40.2 (104.4)
Mean daily maximum °C (°F)	6.6 (43.9)	7.6 (45.7)	12.3 (54.1)	18.6 (65.5)	22.8 (73.0)	27.7 (81.9)	31.1 (88.0)	30.9 (87.6)	26.1 (79.0)	19.4 (66.9)	12.4 (54.3)	7.6 (45.7)	18.7 (65.7)
Daily mean °C (°F)	1.3 (34.3)	2.7 (36.9)	6.8 (44.2)	12.6 (54.7)	17.0 (62.6)	21.5 (70.7)	24.5 (76.1)	23.9 (75.0)	19.5 (67.1)	13.2 (55.8)	7.7 (45.9)	3.3 (37.9)	12.8 (55.0)
Mean daily minimum °C (°F)	−1.0 (30.2)	−0.7 (30.7)	2.8 (37.0)	8.0 (46.4)	12.4 (54.3)	16.6 (61.9)	20.0 (68.0)	19.7 (67.5)	15.7 (60.3)	10.4 (50.7)	4.6 (40.3)	0.4 (32.7)	9.1 (48.4)
Record low °C (°F)	−24.1 (−11.4)	−13.1 (8.4)	−8.0 (17.6)	−2.4 (27.7)	2.2 (36.0)	8.3 (46.9)	13.0 (55.4)	12.1 (53.8)	5.5 (41.9)	−0.7 (30.7)	−6.4 (20.5)	−10.9 (12.4)	−24.1 (−11.4)
Average precipitation mm (inches)	20.2 (0.80)	26.5 (1.04)	32.8 (1.29)	56.4 (2.22)	86.2 (3.39)	72.1 (2.84)	48.2 (1.90)	43.8 (1.72)	42.7 (1.68)	42.7 (1.68)	35.2 (1.39)	25.0 (0.98)	531.6 (20.93)
Source: NCEI

== Demographics ==
Main ethnic groups of Tbilisi
Year	Georgians	%	Armenians	%	Russians	%	Total
1780	50,000	66.7%	10,000	13.3%	–	–	75,000
1790	44,000	61.1%	12,000	16.7%	–	–	72,000
1801–1803	4,300	21.5%	14,860	74.3%	–	–	20,000
1864/65 winter	14,878	24.8%	28,404	47.3%	12,462	20.7%	60,085
1864/65 summer	14,787	20.8%	31,180	43.9%	12,142	17.1%	71,051
1876	22,156	21.3%	37,610	36.1%	30,813	29.6%	104,024
1897	42,206 (Note: Denotes the number of native speakers of Kartvelian languages.)	26.4%	47,133 (Note: Denotes the number of native speakers of Armenian; the number of Armenian Apostolics and Armenian Catholics was 50,801 or 31.8%.)	29.5%	44,823	28.1%	159,590
1916	37,584	10.8%	149,294	43.1%	91,997	26.5%	346,766
1926	112,014	38.1%	100,148	34.1%	45,937	15.6%	294,044
1939	228,394	44%	137,331	26.4%	93,337	18%	519,220
1959	336,257	48.4%	149,258	21.5%	125,674	18.1%	694,664
1970	511,379	57.5%	150,205	16.9%	124,316	14%	889,020
1979	653,242	62.1%	152,767	14.5%	129,122	12.3%	1,052,734
1989	824,412	66.1%	150,138	12.0%	124,867	10.0%	1,246,936
2002	910,712	84.2%	82,586	7.6%	32,580	3%	1,081,679
2014	996,804	89.9%	53,409	4.8%	13,350	1.2%	1,108,717
2024	1,136,586	85.4%	54,580	4.1%	22,760	1.7%	1,331,485

As a multiethnic city, Tbilisi is home to more than 100 ethnic groups. Around 85% of the population consists of ethnic Georgians, with significant populations of other ethnic groups such as Armenians, Russians, and Azerbaijanis. Along with the above-mentioned groups, Tbilisi is home to other ethnic groups including Ossetians, Abkhazians, Ukrainians, Greeks, Jews, Assyrians, Yazidis, and others.

=== Religion ===
Sameba Cathedral

More than 91% of the residents of Tbilisi practise some form of Christianity (the most predominant of which is the Georgian Orthodox Church). The Russian Orthodox Church, which is in full communion with the Georgian Orthodox Church, and the Armenian Apostolic Church have significant followings as well. A minority of the population (around 2.1%) practises Islam (mainly Shia Islam), while about 0.1% of Tbilisi's population practises Judaism. Also, a Roman Catholic church and the Yazidi Sultan Ezid Temple can be found in the city.

== Sports ==
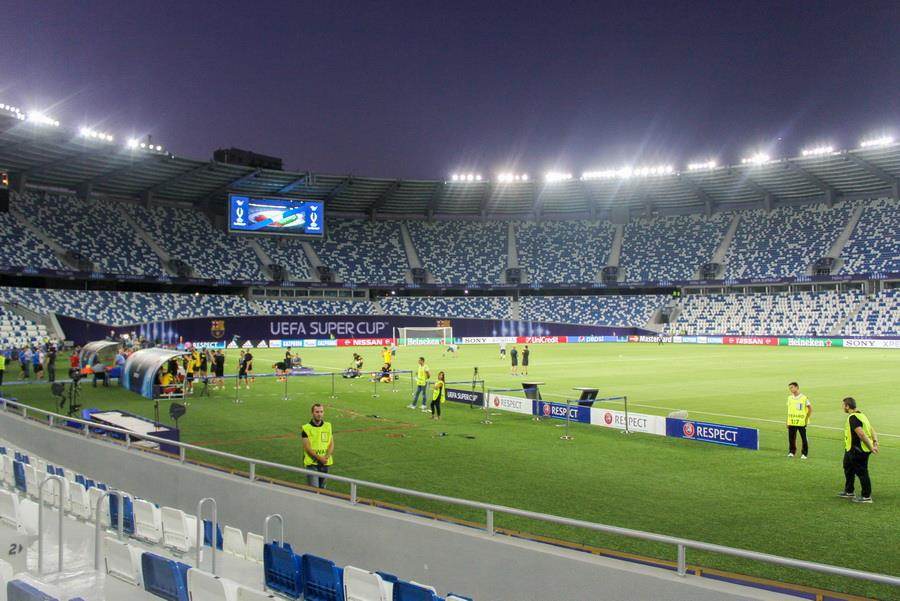
Preparations for the 2015 UEFA Super Cup at the Dinamo Arena in Tbilisi

Until the beginning of the 19th century, sports such as horse-riding (polo in particular), wrestling, boxing, and marksmanship were the most popular city sports. Influence from the Russian Empire brought more Western sports and activities (billiards, fencing) to Tbilisi.

The Soviet period brought an increased popularization of sports that were common in Europe and, to a certain extent, the United States. At the same time, Tbilisi developed the necessary infrastructure for professional sports. By 1978, the city had around 250 large and small sports facilities, including, among others, four indoor and six outdoor Olympic-sized pools, 185 basketball courts and halls, 192 volleyball facilities, 82 handball arenas, 19 tennis courts, 31 football fields, and five stadiums. The largest stadium in Tbilisi is the Dinamo Arena (55,000 seats) and the second-largest is the Mikheil Meskhi Stadium (24,680 seats). The Sports Palace, which usually hosts basketball games with high attendance and tennis tournaments, can seat about 11,000 people. Vere Basketball Hall is a smaller indoor sports arena with a seating capacity of 2,500.

Football is the most popular sport in Tbilisi, followed by rugby and basketball. Other popular sports include wrestling, tennis, swimming, and water polo. It has several professional football and rugby teams, as well as wrestling clubs. U.S. National Basketball Association players Zaza Pachulia and Nikoloz Tskitishvili are Tbilisi natives. Outside of professional sports, the city has a number of intercollegiate and amateur sports teams and clubs.

Tbilisi's signature football club, Dinamo Tbilisi, has not won a major European championship since the 1980–1981 season, when it won the European UEFA Cup Winners' Cup and became the easternmost team in Europe to achieve the feat. The basketball club Dinamo Tbilisi won the Euroleague in 1962, but also never repeated any such feat.

Tbilisi hosted Group A matches for the EuroBasket 2022 at the new 10,000-seat Tbilisi Arena (next to the Olympic Palace), as one of the tournament co-hosts alongside Czech Republic (Prague), Germany (Berlin, Cologne), and Italy (Milan).

Club	Sport	Stadium
Lelo Saracens	Rugby Union	Lelo Sport Centre
RC Armazi Tbilisi	Rugby Union	Shevardeni Stadium
RC Locomotive Tbilisi	Rugby Union	Avchala Stadium
RC Army Tbilisi	Rugby Union	Avchala Stadium
FC Dinamo Tbilisi	Football	Boris Paichadze Stadium
FC Locomotive Tbilisi	Football	Mikheil Meskhi Stadium
FC Saburtalo Tbilisi	Football	Bendela Stadium
FC WIT Georgia	Football	Mikheil Meskhi Stadium #2
BC Dinamo Tbilisi	Basketball	Tbilisi Sports Palace
BC TSU Tbilisi	Basketball	Tbilisi Sports Palace
BC MIA Academy	Basketball	Tbilisi Sports Palace
BC Armia	Basketball	Tbilisi Sports Palace
Maccabi Brinkford Tbilisi	Basketball	Tbilisi Sports Palace
B.C. VITA Tbilisi	Basketball	Tbilisi Sports Palace

== Media ==
The large majority of Georgia's media companies (including television, newspaper, and radio) are headquartered in Tbilisi. The city is home to the popular television channels Rustavi 2, Imedi, TV Pirveli, Mtavari Arkhi, Formula, Maestro, and the Public Broadcasting Channel, among others. Tbilisi's television market has experienced notable changes since 2019, when changes in the ownership of Rustavi 2 prompted many of its employees to leave and partake in the creation of new television channels, namely Mtavari Arkhi and TV Formula.

Tbilisi has a number of newspaper publishing houses. Some of the most noteworthy newspapers include the daily 24 Saati ("24 Hours"), Rezonansi ("Resonance"), Alia, the English-language daily The Messenger, weekly FINANCIAL, Georgia Today, and the English-language weekly The Georgian Times. Out of the city's radio stations Imedi Radio (105.9 FM), Fortuna, and Radio 105 are some of the most influential competitors with large national audiences.

Radio stations in Tbilisi include 5 Lines Radio (93.8 FM), Europe +Tbilisi (99.6 FM), and Georgian Patriarchy Radio (105.4 FM).

== Culture ==
=== Architecture ===
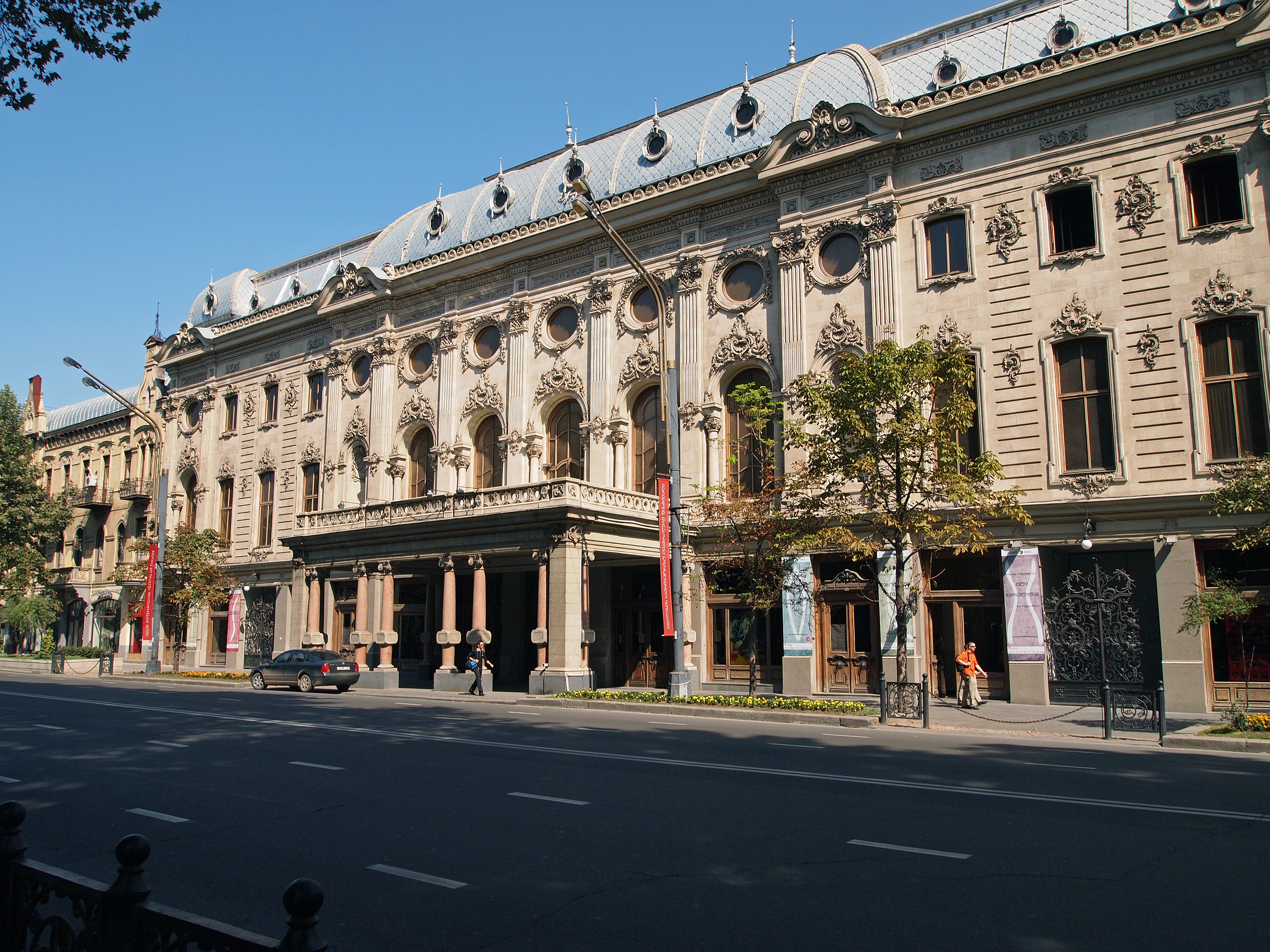
Rustaveli Theatre seen on the Rustaveli Avenue

The architecture in the city is a mixture of local (Georgian) and Byzantine, Neoclassical, Art Nouveau, Beaux-Arts, Middle Eastern, and Soviet modern styles. Very few buildings survived the destruction of the city in 1795, so most historical buildings in Tbilisi date to the Russian Imperial period (1801–1917). The oldest parts of the city (Kala, Abanotubani, Avlabari) were largely rebuilt on their medieval street plans, and some old houses were even rebuilt on much older foundations. The areas of downtown Tbilisi which were developed according to a European-style plan by Russian authorities (Sololaki, Rustaveli Avenue, Vera, etc.) have a Western appearance, with a mix of styles popular in Europe at the time: Beaux Arts, Orientalist, and various period revival styles.

Tbilisi is most notable for its abundance of Art Nouveau buildings and details (common in Sololaki and Chughureti), which flourished from the mid-1890s to through the end of Russian rule. Art Nouveau was decreed as bourgeois by communist authorities, who introduced experimental modern architecture. The more conservative and historically inflected Stalinist architecture in Georgia is embodied by the 1938 Marx-Engels-Lenin Institute building ("Imeli"), now housing the Biltmore Hotel Tbilisi.

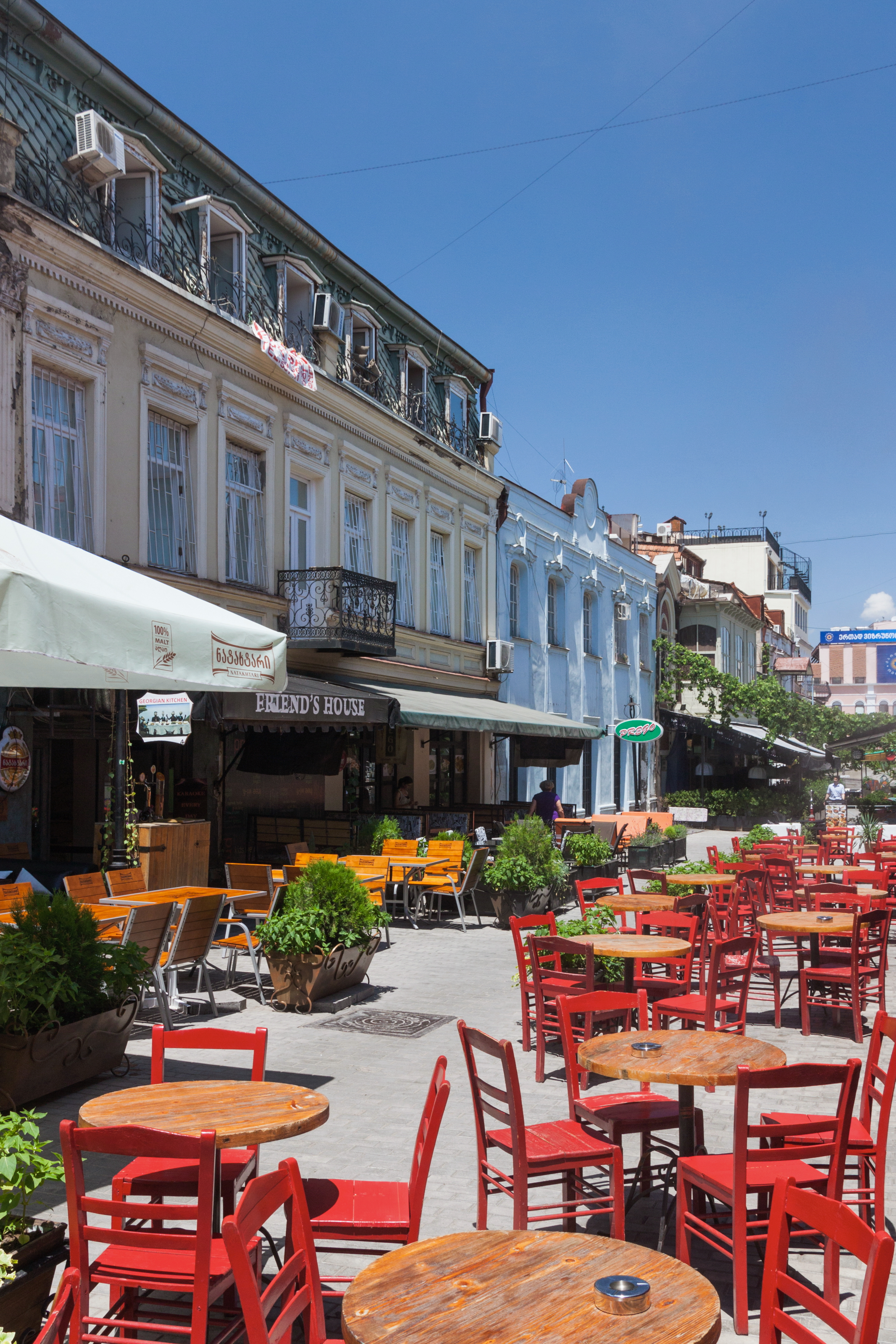
Open-air cafés in Old Tbilisi

Tbilisi's postwar architecture is similar to the brand of midcentury modernism found across the Soviet Union. The city expanded dramatically in response to a housing crisis after World War II. Entire neighborhoods (Saburtalo, Dighomi) appeared on the outskirts of the city in a matter of decades, built with advances in mass-production technology. Georgian architects produced some of the Soviet Union's most interesting architectural achievements, including Tbilisi's 1975 Ministry of Roads and the 1984 Wedding Palace. Since the collapse of the Soviet Union, the urban landscape is largely characterized by unregulated construction. New towers occupy formerly public spaces and overcrowded apartment buildings sprout "kamikaze loggia" overnight. Since 2004, the city government has taken initiatives to curb uncontrolled construction projects with mixed success. Tbilisi now has several skyscraper complexes, such as the Axis Towers, Hilton Garden Inn Tbilisi Chavchavadze, Holiday Inn Tbilisi, and King David Residences.

=== Art museums and galleries ===
The Georgian National Museum gathers several important museums, including the Art Museum of Georgia. The Museum of Modern Art was founded in 2012. Two independent contemporary art organizations, Kunsthalle Tbilisi and Open Space of Experimental Art, were founded in 2018. Among many other museums, there are the Giorgi Leonidze State Museum of Literature and the Writer's House of Georgia.

=== Performing arts ===
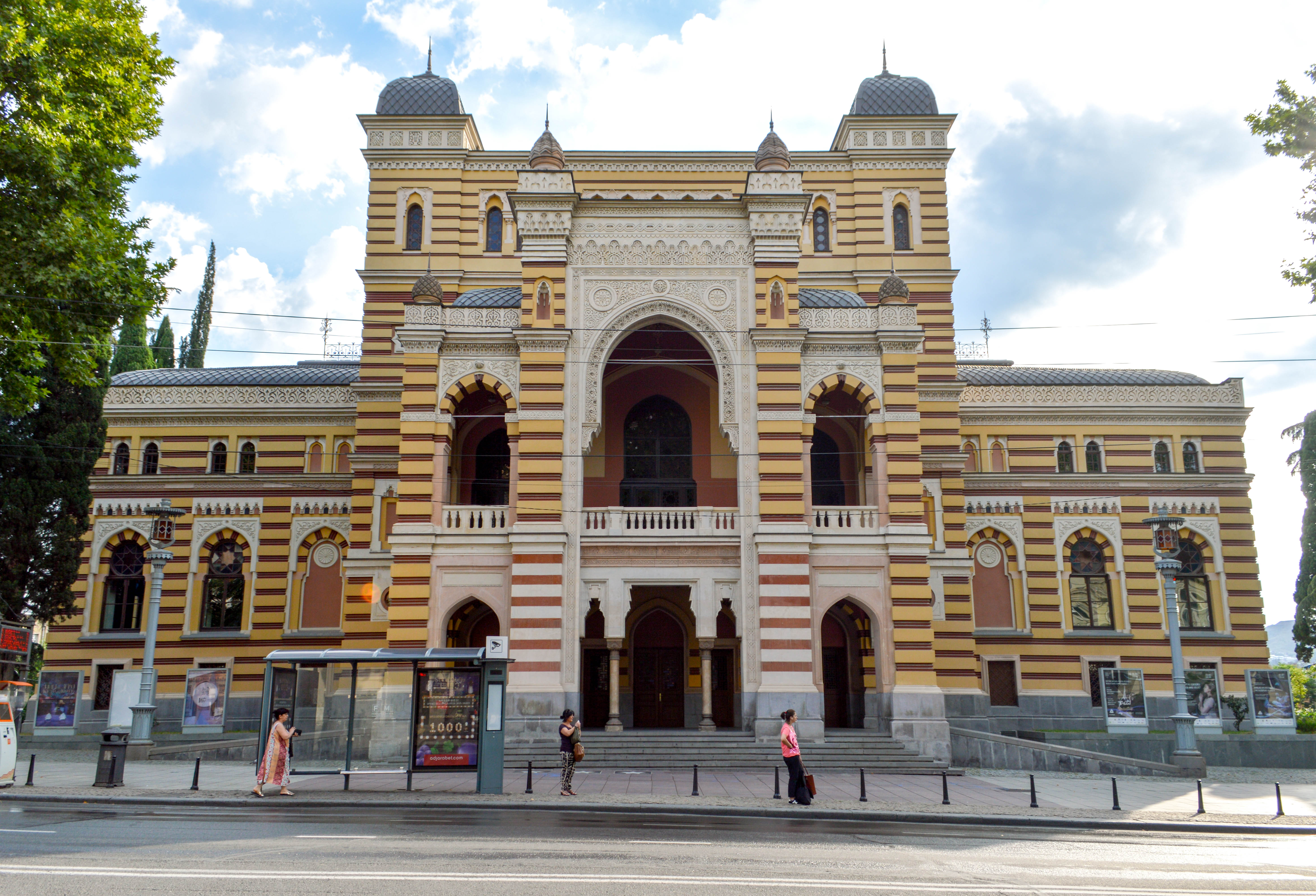
Tbilisi Opera and Ballet Theatre

The city has important theatre and music institutions, such as the Tbilisi State Conservatoire, the Tbilisi Opera and Ballet Theatre, the Shota Rustaveli State Academic Theatre, Marjanishvili State Academic Theatre, Rezo Gabriadze Marionette Theatre and Royal District Theatre.

==== Film Festival ====
The Tbilisi International Film Festival (TIFF) is hosted by the Cinema Art Center, Prometheus. It was first held in 2000, within a larger framework of festivals called Gift, until the Prometheus centre was established in 2002, after which it has been held there. It is located at 164 Agmashenebeli Avenue.

=== World Book Capital ===
Tbilisi was designated as the World Book Capital for 2021 by UNESCO.

== Tourism ==
Georgia's growing popularity as an international tourist destination has put Tbilisi on the global travel map. With the country hosting more than 9 million international visitors in 2019, the capital saw major investments in the hospitality industry. It is now the leading tourist destination in the region, offering many cityscapes, Art Deco, Russian, Eastern and Soviet architecture, national museums and galleries, cultural attractions, festivals, historical landmarks and traditional Georgian cuisine along with a wide range of international restaurants. The city is well-known, due to its complicated history as having many cultures, and a diverse metropolis with a palette of attractions.

=== Main sights ===
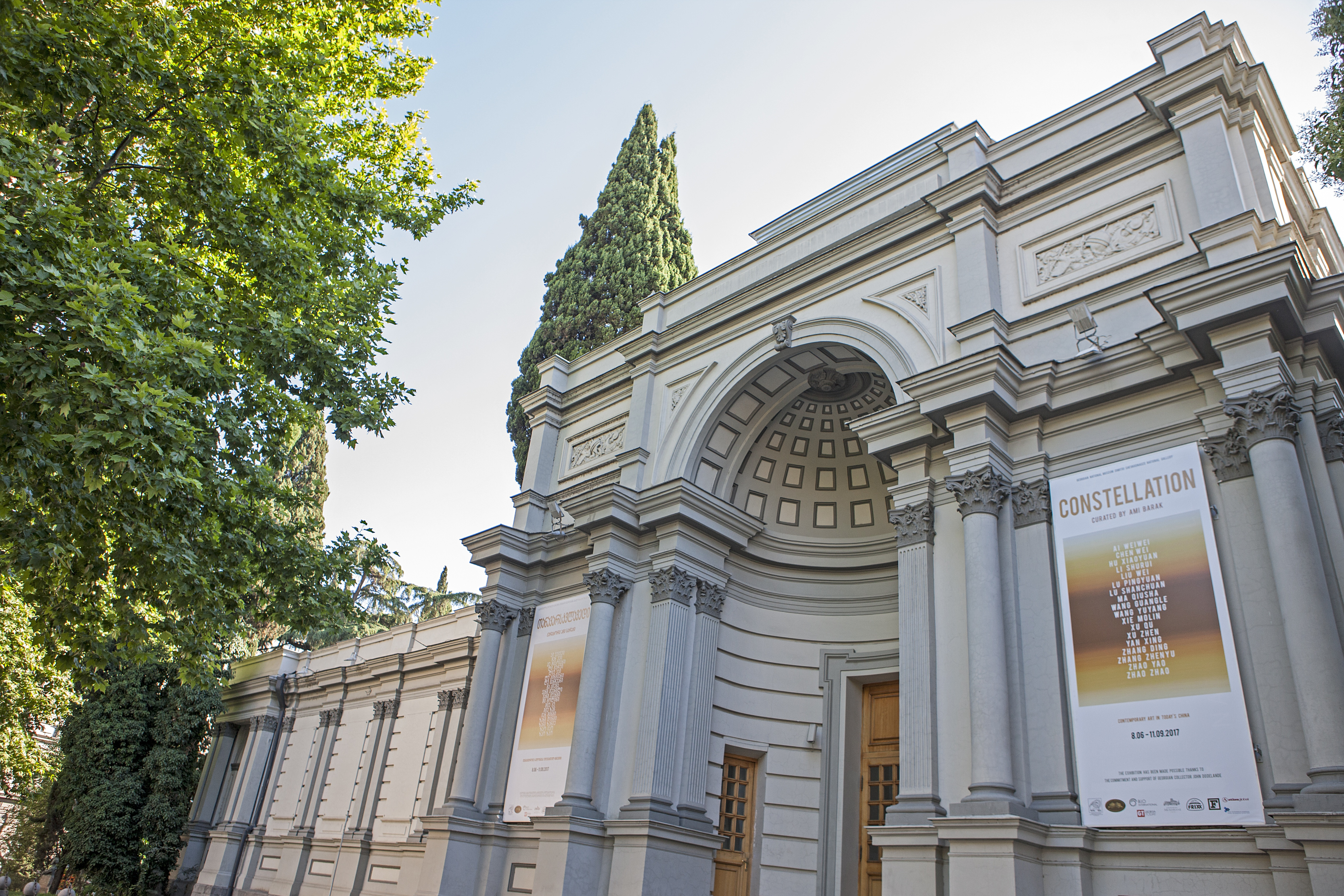
Tbilisi Art Gallery

Tbilisi has important landmarks and sightseeing locations. The Parliament and the government (State Chancellery) buildings of Georgia, the Supreme Court of Georgia, the Sameba Cathedral, the Vorontsov's Palace (also known as the Children's Palace today), the National Public Library of the Parliament of Georgia, the National Bank of Georgia, Tbilisi Circus, The Bridge of Peace, and many state museums are in Tbilisi. During the Soviet times, Tbilisi continuously ranked in the top four cities in the Soviet Union for the number of museums.

Out of the city's historic landmarks, the most notable are the Narikala fortress (4th–17th century), Anchiskhati Basilica (6th century, built up in the 16th century), Sioni Cathedral (8th century, later rebuilt), and Church of Metekhi, Open Air Museum of Ethnography, Sulfur Bath, and Tbilisi Old City.

=== Nightlife ===
Beyond traditional attractions, Tbilisi has developed burgeoning nightclub culture which started to attract international media attention in the 2010s. The leading clubs such as Bassiani, Mtkvarze, Khidi, and Café Gallery have featured major international DJs as well as local performers. Due to the growing queer nightlife scene the city is also home to several underground LGBTQ+ venues.

== Economy ==
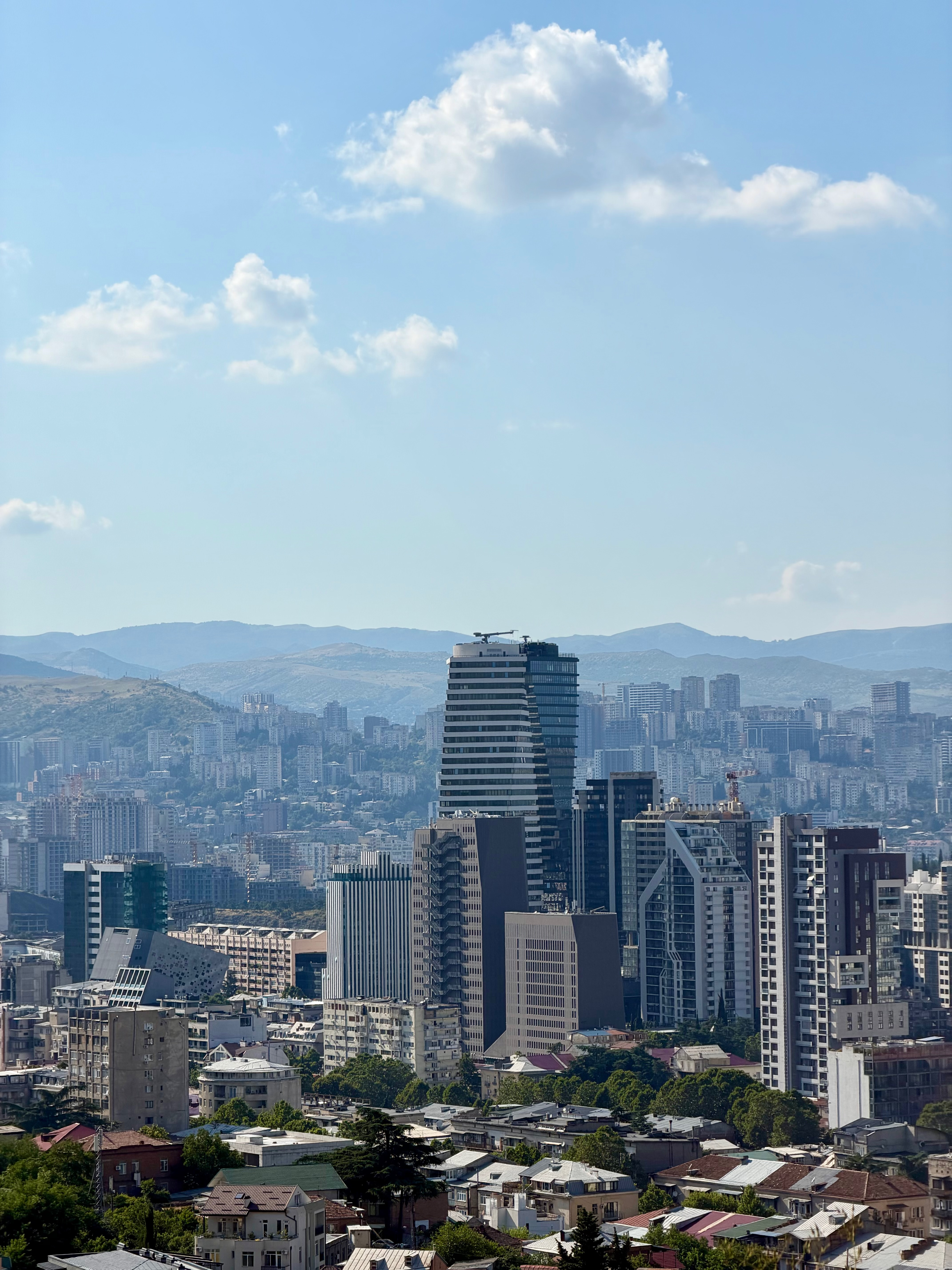
New high-rise residential and office buildings in Vake, 2026

With a nominal GDP of 32 billion Georgian lari (€10 billion) in 2022, Tbilisi is the economic center of the country, generating more than half of Georgia's GDP. Its GDP per capita of 26,769 Georgian lari (€8,700) is exceeding the national average by more than 50 percent. The service sector itself is dominated by the wholesale and retail trade sector, reflecting the role of Tbilisi as transit and logistics hub for the country and the South Caucasus. The manufacturing sector contributes only 12 percent to Tbilisi's GDP, but is much larger, by employment and total value added, than the manufacturing sectors in any other region of Georgia. The unemployment rate in Tbilisi is – with 22.5 percent – significantly higher in Tbilisi than in the regions.

== Transport ==
The public transport system and the relevant infrastructure in Tbilisi is primarily managed by the Transport and Urban Development Agency. After decades of poor transport services and the prioritization of private vehicles, the city has invested heavily in developing a green, extensive and diverse public transit network since the 2010s. Today, the city is served by an international airport, metro and national rail services, municipal buses, minibuses, cabs, cable cars, bike lanes and a funicular.

=== Airport ===
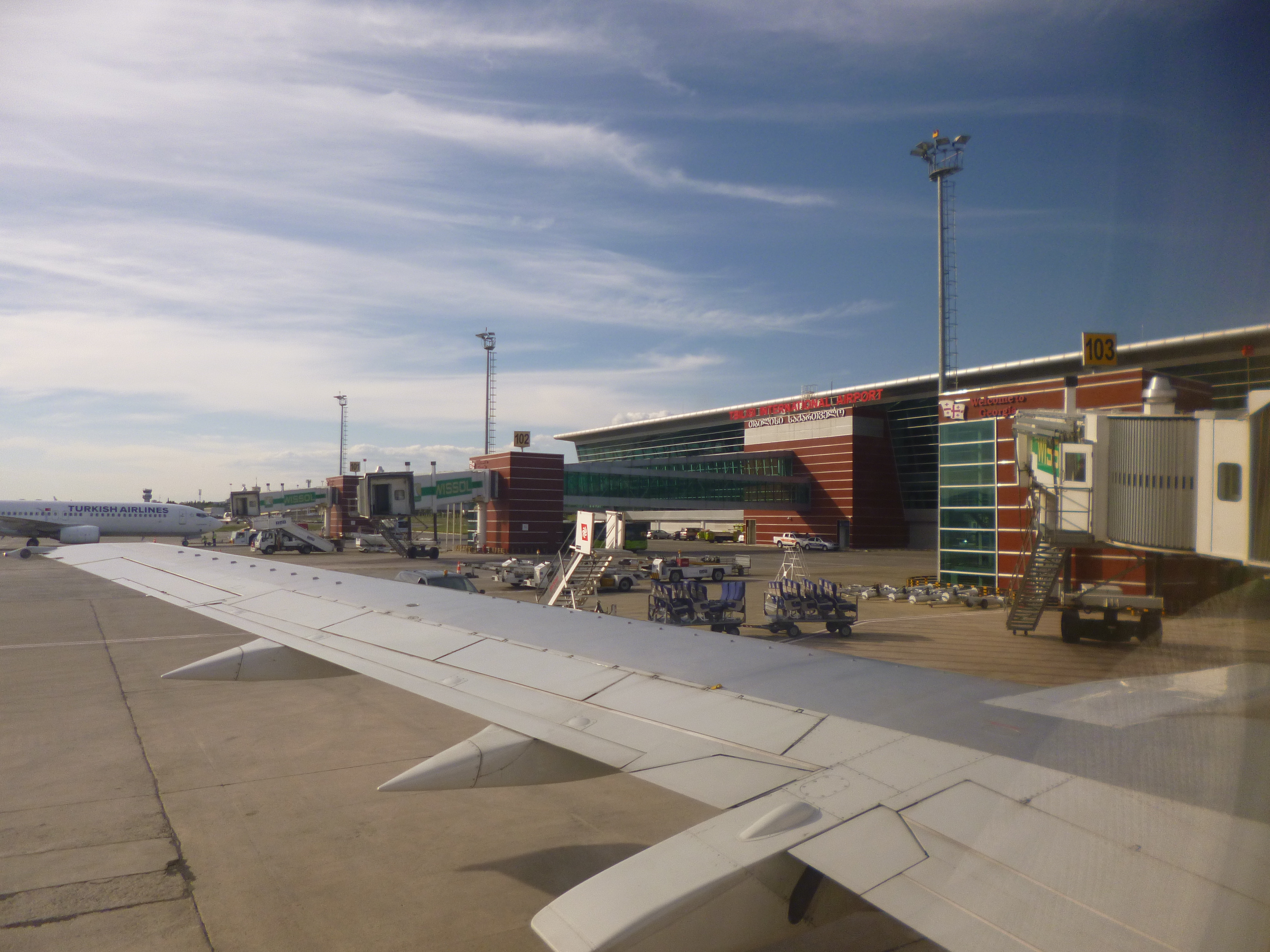
Tbilisi International Airport

Shota Rustaveli Tbilisi International Airport is Tbilisi's only international airport, located about 18 kilometres (11 miles) southeast of the city center. Handling 2.99 million passengers in 2022, it is the busiest airport in Georgia and the twentieth busiest airport in the former Soviet Union. The airport has been rapidly growing over the past decade, handling more than 3.56 million passengers in 11 months of 2018. It is a hub for the national carrier Georgian Airways and Georgian-Chinese start-up Myway Airlines. Various international carriers serve routes to major European and Asian hubs, such as London, Munich, Berlin, Amsterdam, Dubai, Brussels, Milan, Vienna, Paris, and Doha. The Irish ultra-low-cost carrier Ryanair started operating from the airport in 2019.

Tbilisi International Airport in 2016 started to utilize solar energy and became the first "green airport" in the Caucasus region in 2008.

Natakhtari Airfield, located 33 km north of Tbilisi in the town of Natakhtari, is a domestic airport serving the capital on routes to Batumi, Mestia and Ambrolauri.

=== Metro ===
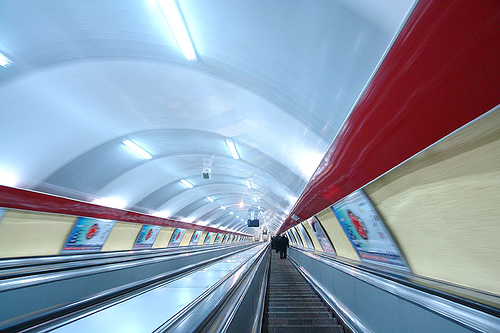
Tbilisi Metro station

The Tbilisi Metro serves the city with rapid transit subway services. More than 400,000 journeys are made on the system every single day. It was the Soviet Union's fourth metro system. Construction began in 1952 and was finished in 1966. The system operates two lines, the Akhmeteli-Varketili Line and the Saburtalo Line. It has 23 stations and 186 metro cars. Most stations, characteristic to Soviet-built metro systems, are extravagantly decorated. Trains run from 6:00 am to midnight. Due to the uneven ground, the rail lines run above ground in some areas. Two of the stations are above ground.

In 2020, it was announced by the city government that the metro system is set for a major upgrade with the renovation of all stations, targeting more sustainable and modern design, as well as step-free wheelchair accessibility. Moreover, Tbilisi will purchase 40 new, modern train cars, or 10 trains, becoming the first major rolling stock upgrade in the network's more than 50-year-old history.

The third overground line is planned to connect central Tbilisi with suburbs and Tbilisi International Airport with a possible extension to Rustavi, 30 km east of Tbilisi.

=== Rail ===
Tbilisi is the busiest intersection of Georgian Railways services, primarily centred within Tbilisi Central Railway Station. From there, the national rail operator offers inter-city services to Batumi, Zugdidi, Poti, Ozurgeti, Kutaisi and other large cities, as well as several suburban rail services.

=== Buses ===
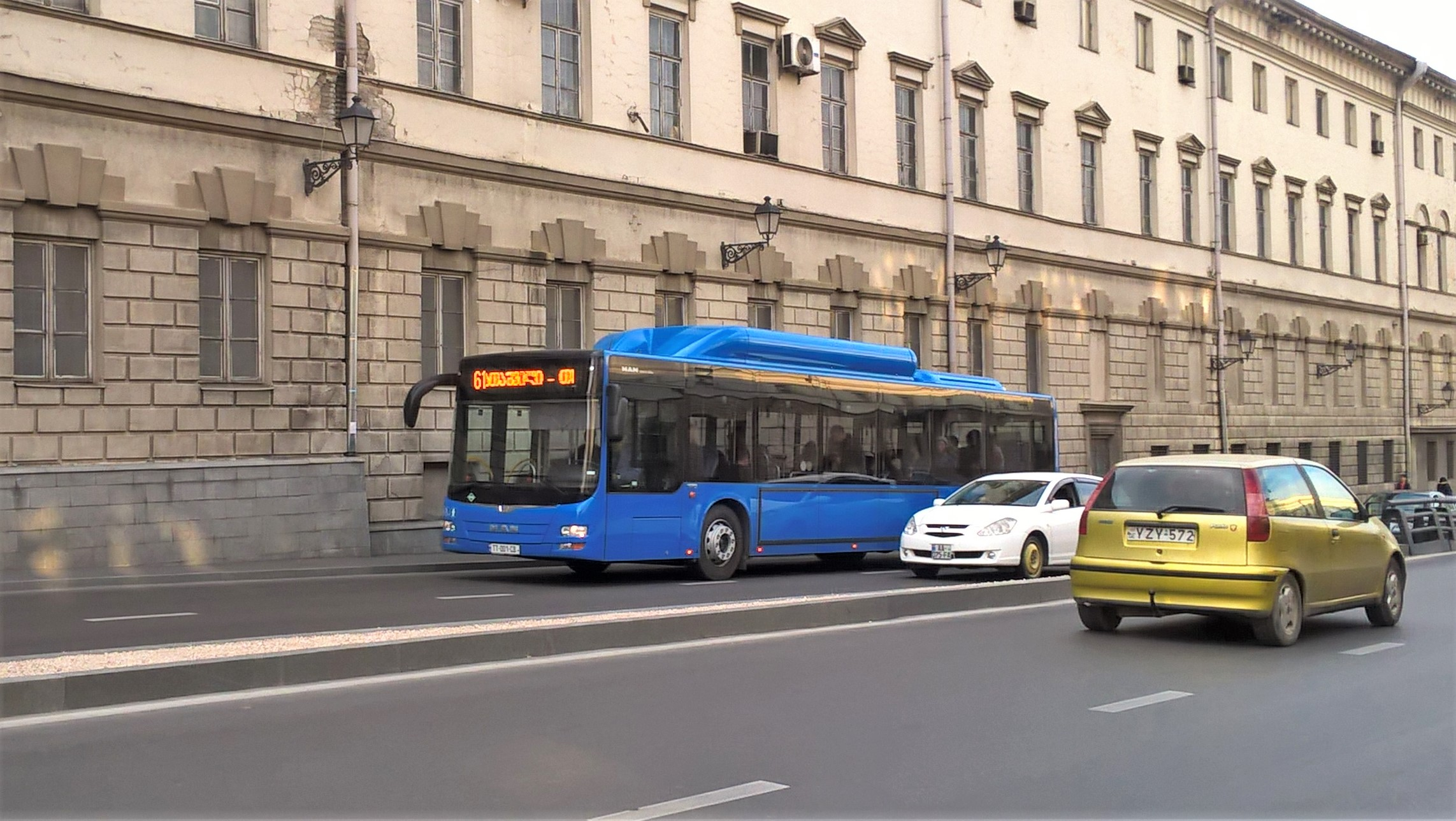
Tbilisi's municipal bus fleet

Tbilisi's bus network forms a crucial backbone of the city's transit system. For almost a decade, up to 700 outdated buses of various size were serving the city, majority of them were Ukrainian Bogdan A144 and A092 models. Nowadays the city has an extensive network of municipal buses, including a growing number of night bus services. In August 2020, the mayor of Tbilisi Kakha Kaladze announced major changes in the existing public transit system. Notably, the city will have 10 Bus Rapid Transit corridors in the near future, served by large 18-meter-long buses running at significantly shorter intervals. These services are named TBT (Tbilisi Bus Transit) lines and are indexed numbers from 300 until 310. Besides the TBT lines, the new system includes 44 city and 185 local lines, totalling up to over 240 bus routes within the city.

The initial reorganization of the bus network started in 2016 when then-mayor Davit Narmania started an ambitious project in efforts to revamp the outdated fleet. Under his city government, 143 energy-efficient MAN Lion's City buses were purchased and delivered in 2017. Later, in 2018, a tender was announced to order 90 new buses. Tegeta Truck & Bus won the tender and delivered 90 Man Lion's City low floor buses to the city in early 2019. Later on, the city purchased more than 400 new buses from two different manufacturers, including 12-meter-long, low floor BMC vehicles and shorter, 8.5-meter-long Isuzu city buses. It was also announced that the city will buy 200 18-meter-long articulated buses in the near future in hopes of further expanding the city's bus network and decreasing intervals.

=== Cycling ===
Cycling has become increasingly popular among the residents of Tbilisi over the past few years. For decades, this green mode of transport was seen unfit for the mountainous and uneven terrain of the city. However, as the city's government started introducing new bike lanes across the city, a rising number of people turned towards bikes for regular use. One of the first major central Tbilisi bike lanes opened along Pekini Avenue in 2017, following a long rehabilitation process. The 2.8 meter wide lane failed to attract regular users amid the lack of a greater, city-wide network. Soon the city unveiled more bike lanes, including within recreational areas, such as the National Botanical Garden of Georgia and Lisi Lake.

The expansion of the city's cycling infrastructure network was significantly accelerated during the COVID-19 pandemic as cities across the globe started organizing pop-up bike lanes. Tbilisi joined the global trend, unveiling cycling lanes in city's central areas, such as Vake, Vera and the bank of the Kura River. Following these changes, the total length of Tbilisi's bike lanes increased from 2 km in 2019 to over 20 km in 2020. The head of the city's transport department told Euronews Georgia that Tbilisi is working on a 20-year long urban mobility development strategy. According to the plan, the total length of the bike lane network will eventually reach 350 km across the capital.

=== Tram ===
Tbilisi had a tram network starting in 1883 with horse-driven trams, followed by electric trams in 1904. After the Soviet Union disintegrated, due to electricity deficit the electric transport went into decline, and finally the only tram line left was closed on 4 December 2006, along with the two remaining trolleybus lines. There were plans to construct a modern tram network.

=== Minibus ===
For a long time, the most dominant form of transport was the minibus network. An elaborate minibus system grew in Tbilisi over the early 2000s. Amid the lack of public funding and rundown infrastructure, minibuses emerged as a private initiative and a short-term solution to the city's transportation problem. In 2019, the company operating yellow minibuses in Tbilisi was asked to replace the entire fleet by the end of 2020. However, the process was slowed down and only 300 minibuses were replaced. The mayor of Tbilisi announced that the number of minibuses in Tbilisi will gradually decrease, eventually vanishing from Tbilisi's streets.

In addition to the city, several lines also serve the surrounding countryside of Tbilisi. Throughout the city, a fixed price is paid regardless of the distance (80 or 50 tetri in 2018). For longer trips outside the city, higher fares are common. As of April 2018, there are no predefined stops for the minibus lines, except 14 streets; they are hailed from the streets like taxis and each passenger can exit whenever they prefer.

=== Aerial tramways ===
Cable car above old town

One of the newer ropeways, with Mt. Kazbek seen at a distance on the horizon

Historically, the city had seven different aerial tramways, but many of them closed after the collapse of the Soviet Union.

Since 2012, a gondola lift has operated between Rike Park and the Narikala fortress; each gondola can carry up to eight people. The system was built by the Italian manufacturer Leitner Ropeways.

On 12 October 2016, the Turtle Lake aerial tramway (originally opened in 1965) reopened after seven years out of service. It underwent major reconstruction but kept the old designs of gondolas and stations. This tramway connects Vake Park with Turtle Lake.

On 19 April 2021, another Soviet-era aerial tramway between the State University (Maglivi) and the University Campus (Bagebi) in Saburtalo District (originally opened in 1982) was opened after reconstruction works took place in 2016–2018. The original Italian cabins, produced by Lovisolo and provided by Ceretti & Tanfani, with a capacity of 40 passengers each, were kept, as were the stations.

In 1990, one of the main aerial trams experienced a major malfunction, causing the 1990 Tbilisi aerial tramway accident and remaining closed ever since. Since October 2017, the aerial tram has been under reconstruction, keeping the old culturally significant lower station but with plans for new gondolas, masts, upper station and other infrastructure. The project is carried out by Doppelmayr Garaventa Group.

=== Funicular ===
The Tbilisi funicular reopened in 2012 after a multi-year closure. It is a ropeway railway first built in 1905, connecting Chonkadze Street and Mtatsminda Park, and covering almost 300 m (980 ft) in altitude difference. The top of the hill is the highest point of the city, offering many different views of Tbilisi, and is home to the Tbilisi TV Broadcasting Tower as well as some amusement rides, including a rollercoaster and a Ferris wheel.

The half-way station of the funicular is located near the Mtatsminda Pantheon, providing easy access to the necropolis.

== Education ==
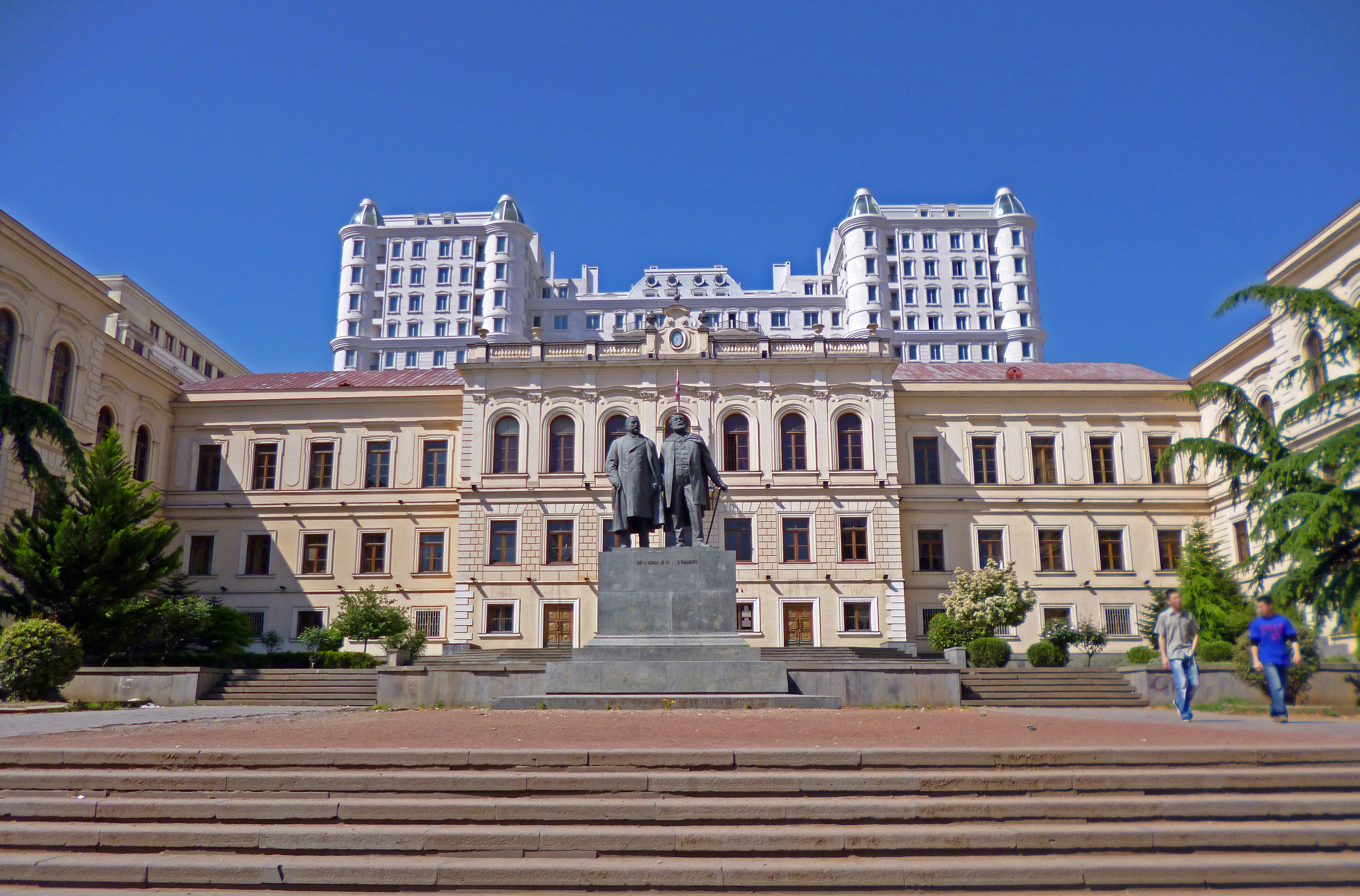
Public School Number 1 of Tbilisi, also known as the First Classical Gymnasium

Tbilisi is home to several major institutions of higher education, including the Tbilisi State Medical University and the Petre Shotadze Tbilisi Medical Academy, famous for their internationally recognized medical education systems. The biggest Georgian university is Tbilisi State University (TSU), which was established on 8 February 1918. TSU is the oldest university in the whole Caucasus region, with up to 25,000 students enrolled and approximately 5,000 faculty members and staff (collaborators). Tbilisi is also home to the largest medical university in the Caucasus region – Tbilisi State Medical University, which was founded as the Tbilisi Medical Institute in 1918 and became the Faculty of Medicine within the Tbilisi State University in 1930. Tbilisi State Medical Institute was renamed to Medical University in 1992. Since it operates as an independent educational institution, it has become one of the highest-ranking state-supported institutions of higher education in the Caucasus region. As of 2023, there are over 7,000 undergraduate and 3,000 postgraduate students at the university, of whom about a quarter come from foreign countries.

Georgia's main and largest technical university, Georgian Technical University, is in Tbilisi. It was founded in 1922 as a polytechnic faculty of the Tbilisi State University. The first lecture was read by world-famous Georgian mathematician Professor Andria Razmadze. It was transformed into an independent institute in 1928, until it was finally granted University status in 1990.

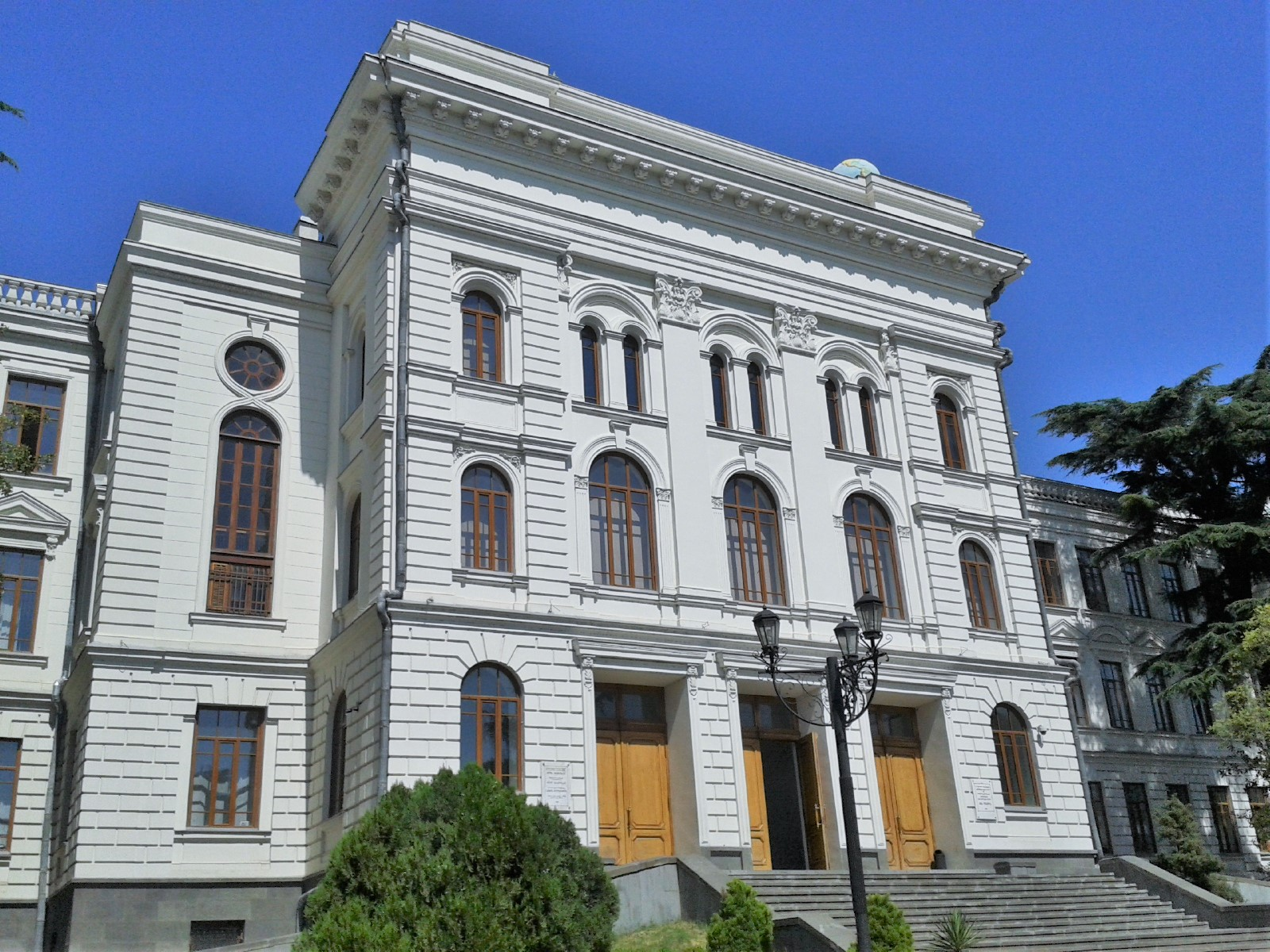
Tbilisi State University, Building I

Three of the most popular private higher educational institutions in Georgia – The University of Georgia (Tbilisi), Caucasus University, and the Free University of Tbilisi – are in Tbilisi. The University of Georgia (Tbilisi) is the largest private University in Georgia, with more than 8,000 international and local students. Soon after its establishment, it became a market leader within the Georgian educational sector. In 2010, the UG received financing from the Overseas Private Investment Corporation (OPIC) for the development of the university's infrastructure and technical equipment. The University of Georgia has various undergraduate and graduate programs, and it was the first Georgian university to offer international certificate programs of the Oracle Corporation, Microsoft, Zend Technologies and Cisco Academy.

Caucasus University was established in 2004 as an expansion of the Caucasus School of Business (CSB, established in 1998) by a consortium consisting of Tbilisi State University and Georgian Technical University in partnership with Georgia State University (Atlanta, USA).

The Free University of Tbilisi was established in 2007 through a merger of two higher education schools: the European School of Management (ESM-Tbilisi) and the Tbilisi Institute of Asia and Africa (TIAA), both of which then became schools within the university. Aside from that, the Free University now comprises six other schools — Law School, Governance and Social Sciences, Visual Arts and Design (VAADS), Mathematics and Computer Science (MACS), Physics, and Doctoral School in Social and Humanitarian Sciences — that deliver academic programs at the undergraduate, graduate and doctorate levels. In addition, Free University conducts a wide array of short-term courses and runs several research centers and summer school programs.

Higher educational institutions in Tbilisi:

- Tbilisi State University
- Ilia State University
- Georgian Technical University
- Tbilisi State Conservatory
- Shota Rustaveli Theatre and Film University
- Sulkhan-Saba Orbeliani University
- Tbilisi State Academy of Arts
- The University of Georgia (Tbilisi)
- Tbilisi State Medical University
- Caucasus University
- Caucasus International University
- Tbilisi Medical Academy
- Free University of Tbilisi
- Grigol Robakidze University – Alma Mater
- Georgian American University
- International Black Sea University
- Georgian Institute of Public Affairs
- Agricultural University of Georgia
- International School of Economics (ISET)
- The University of Geomedi
- New Vision University
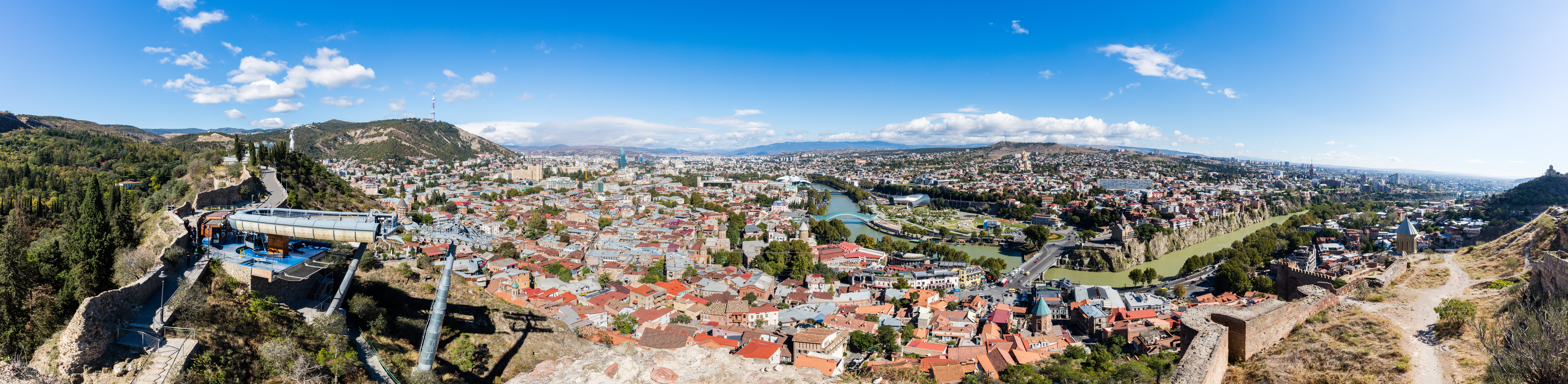
Panoramic view of Tbilisi from Narikala in 2016.

== International relations ==
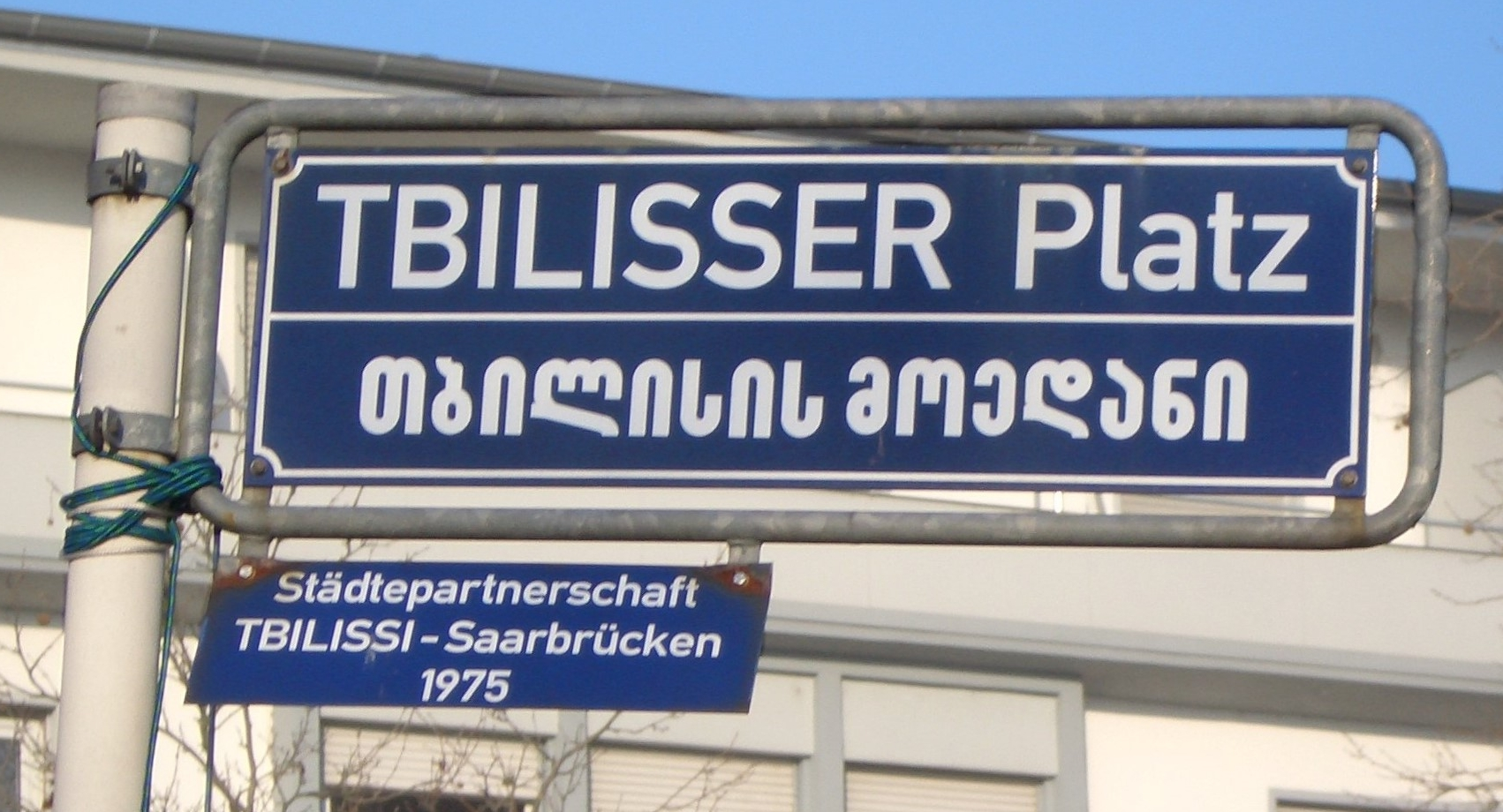
Tbilisi Platz in Saarbrücken, Germany.

=== Twin towns and sister cities ===
Tbilisi is twinned with:

Saarbrücken, Germany (1975); Nantes, France (1979); Ljubljana, Slovenia (1977); Innsbruck, Austria (1982); Palermo, Italy (1987); Bristol, United Kingdom (1988); Atlanta, United States (1988); Bilbao, Spain (1989); Yerevan, Armenia (1996); Kyiv, Ukraine (1999)	Astana, Kazakhstan (2005); Vilnius, Lithuania (2009); Chișinău, Moldova (2011); Cairo, Egypt (2012); Doha, Qatar (2012); Tehran, Iran (2015); Minsk, Belarus (2015) (partner since 1994); Istanbul, Turkey (2016) (partner since 2006); Sofia, Bulgaria (2016); Lima, Peru (2018); Baku, Azerbaijan (2021); Bucharest, Romania (2022)

=== Partnerships ===
Odesa, Ukraine (1996); Ankara, Turkey (1996); Baku, Azerbaijan (1997); Athens, Greece (1997); Paris, France (1997); Jerusalem, Israel (1998); Riga, Latvia (2007); Kraków, Poland (2009); Warsaw, Poland (2010)	Budapest, Hungary (2011); Kharkiv, Ukraine (2012); Lviv, Ukraine (2013); Lincoln, United States (2013); Guangzhou, China (2014); Lublin, Poland (2014); Dublin, Ireland (2014); Prague, Czech Republic

== See also ==
- List of people from Tbilisi
- List of cities and towns in Georgia (country)
