= Timeline of Tbilisi =

The following is a timeline of the history of the city of Tbilisi, Georgia.

== Prior to 13th century ==
- 4th C. CE – Narikala Fortress built.
- c. 517 – First Sasanian officials with the title marzban ("margrave") take up residence in Tbilisi.
- 534 CE – Anchiskhati Basilica built (approximate date).
- 6th C. – Capital of Caucasian Iberia moves to Tbilisi from Mtskheta.
- 570 – Persians in power.
- 626 – Town besieged by Greeks.
- 627 – Town sacked by Byzantine/Khazar forces.
- 639 – Sioni Cathedral built (approximate date).
- 653 – Occupation by Arab leader Khabib Ibn-Maslama.
- 736 – Arab Emirate of Tbilisi is established.
- 764 – Town sacked by Khazars.
- 828 – Town besieged by Khazars.
- 851 – Town besieged by Arabs.
- 853 – Town besieged by forces of Arab Bugha Al-Turki.
- 1029 - Svetitskhoveli Cathedral rebuilt.
- 1068 – Town sacked by forces of Seljuk Turk Alp Arslan.
- 1122 – David IV of Georgia comes to power; relocates capital to Tbilisi from Kutaisi.

== 13th–17th centuries ==
- 1226 – City sacked by forces of Khwarazmian Jalal al-Din Mangburni.
- 1236 – Mongols in power.
- 1251 – Cathedral of Saint George built.
- 1284 – Metekhi Church of Assumption built.
- 1329 – Catholic diocese established.
- 1366 – Plague.
- 1395 – City besieged by Timur.
- 1444 – City sacked by forces of Turcoman Jahan Shah.
- 1467 – Norashen Church founded.
- 1477 – Aq Qoyunlu in power.
- 1480 – Armenian Cathedral rebuilt.
- 1522 – Persians in power.
- 1616 - Complete devastation of Tbilisi during Abbas I's Kakhetian and Kartlian campaigns.
- 1655 – Khojivank church built.
- 1668 – Earthquake.

== 18th century ==
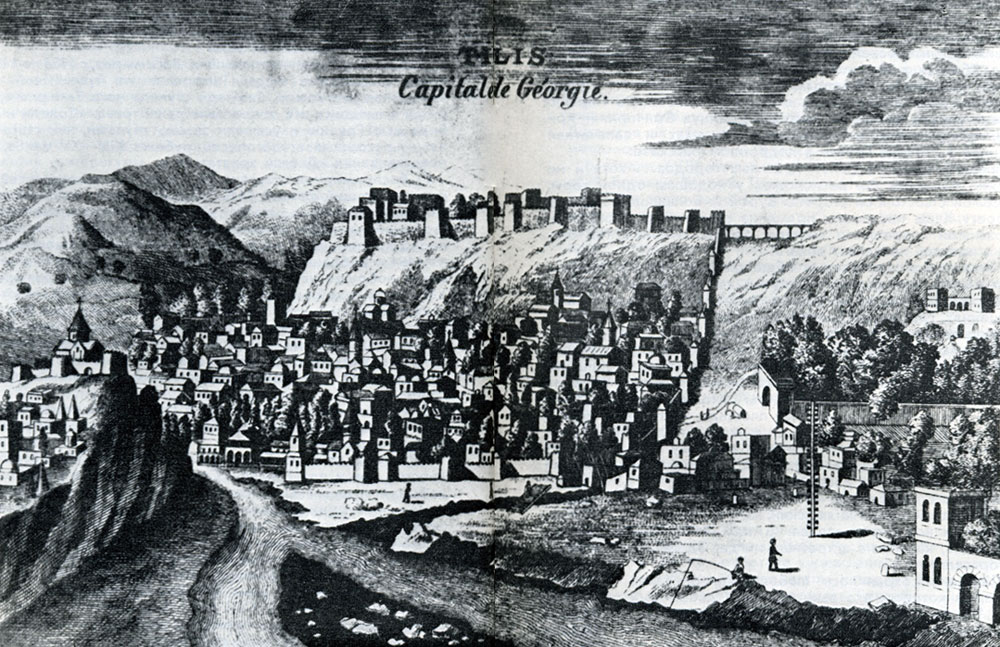
Early 18th century view of the city

- 1711 – Church of the Holy Seal built.
- 1717 – Zrkinyants St. Gevorg (church) built.
- 1727 – Upper Betlemi Church built.
- 1729 – Jigrashen Avetyats Church built (approximate date).
- 1737 – Saint Sargis Church built.
- 1753 – Church of Saint George (Kldisubani) built.
- 1756 – Saint Gevorg of Mughni Church rebuilt.
- 1775 – Church of the Red Gospel built (approximate date).
- 1778 – Krtsanis Tsiranavor Surb Astvatsatsin (church) rebuilt.
- 1788 – Kamoyants St. Gevorg (church) built.
- 1793 – Armenian school opens.
- 1795 – City sacked by forces of Persian Mohammad Khan Qajar.
- 1799 – Russians in power.

== 19th century ==
- 1801 – City becomes part of Russia.
- 1808 - Cathedral of the Assumption of the Virgin building completed.
- 1817 – Tbilisi Spiritual Seminary established.
- 1824 – Nersisyan School established.
- 1830 – Tiflis Gymnasium (school) founded.
- 1840 – Ivan Izmiryants becomes mayor.
- 1845 – Botanical Garden established.
- 1846 – National Parliamentary Library of Georgia established.
- 1848 – City becomes part of Tiflis Governorate.

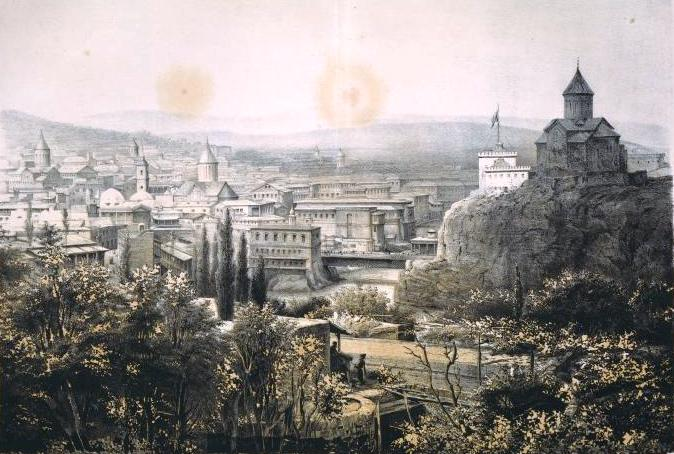
Mid-19th century view of the city

- 1851 – Opera house and Dry Bridge (Tbilisi) built.
- 1858 – Mushthaid Garden opens.
- 1866 – Droeba newspaper begins publication.
- 1867 – Caucasian Museum founded.
- 1868 – Population: 61,000.
- 1870 – Lower Bethlehemi Church built.
- 1872
  - Railway station built.
  - Mshak newspaper begins publication.
  - Alexander Nevsky Cathedral built.
- 1877 – St. Peter and St. Paul's Church completed.
- 1879 – City Assembly building remodelled.
- 1883 – Population: 104,024.
- 1885 – Military Museum built.
- 1887 – Rustaveli Theatre completed.
- 1890 – Armenian Revolutionary Federation founded in Tiflis.
- 1894 – Supreme Court of Georgia building built.
- 1897
  - Garrison Cathedral built.
  - Population: 159,862.
- 1899 – Alexandropol-Tiflis railway begins operating.

== 20th century ==
- 1902 – Erivan-Tiflis railway begins operating.
- 1907 – 26 June: Bank robbery.
- 1909
  - Apollo Theatre (Tbilisi) opens.
  - Alexander Khatisyan becomes mayor.
- 1913 – Population: 327,800.
- 1917
  - Tiflis Governorate abolished.
  - Conservatoire and Armenian National Council of Tiflis founded.

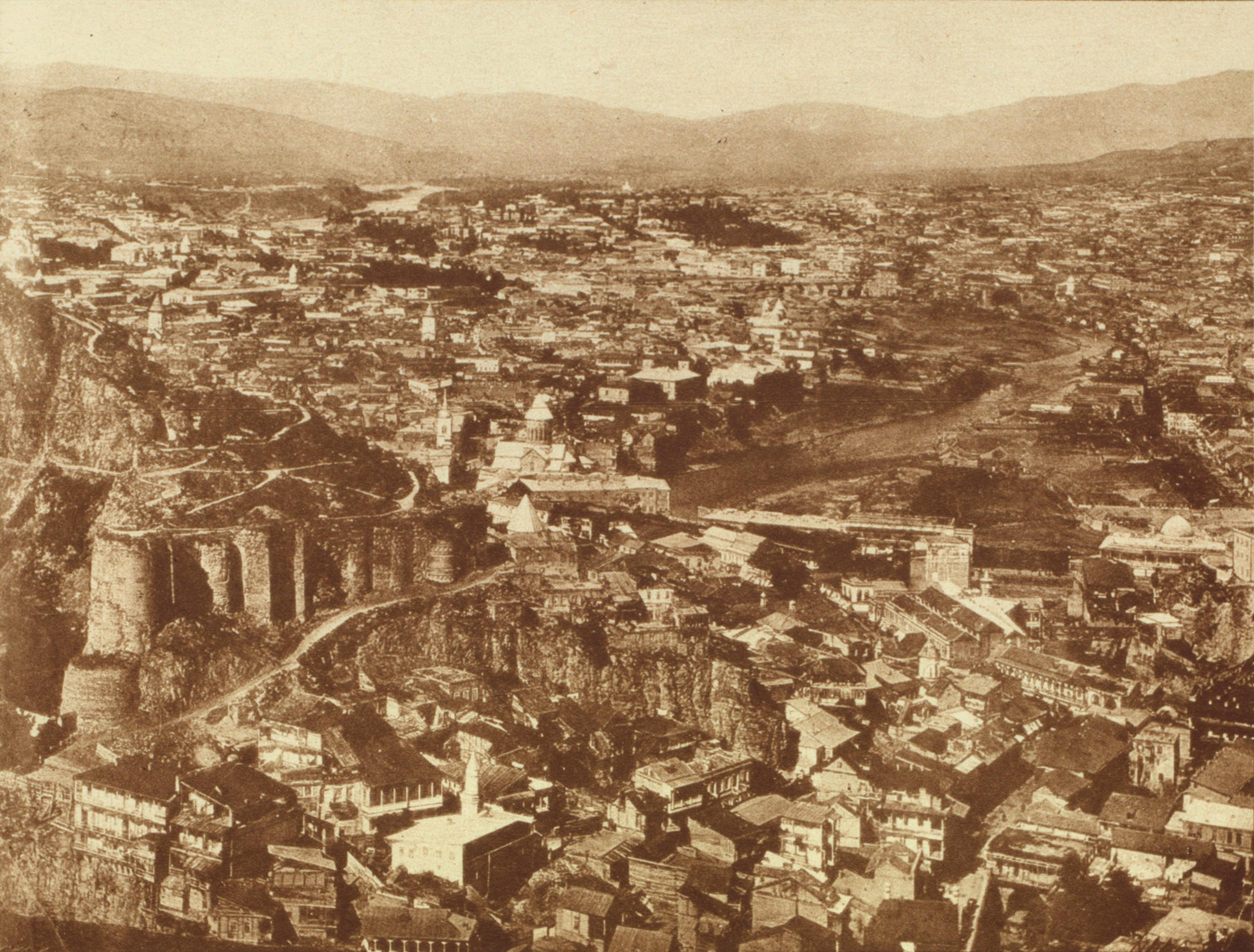
Aerial view of the city in 1919

- 1918
  - February–May: City becomes capital of Transcaucasian Democratic Federative Republic.
  - May: City becomes capital of Democratic Republic of Georgia.
  - Tbilisi State University and Tbilisi Medical Institute established.
  - Benia Chkhikvishvili becomes mayor.
  - National Archives of Georgia headquartered in Tbilisi.
- 1919 – Museum of Georgia active.
- 1920 – National Art Gallery opens.
- 1921 – February: City besieged by Bolshevist Russian Red Army.
- 1922
  - City becomes capital of Transcaucasian Socialist Federative Soviet Republic.
  - Art Academy founded.
- 1925 – FC Dinamo Tbilisi (football club) formed.
- 1927 – Tiflis Zoopark founded.
- 1928 – Georgian Politechnical Institute established.
- 1929 – Mtatsminda Pantheon (cemetery) established.
- 1930
  - Museum of Literature founded.
  - Marjanishvili Theater relocates to Tbilisi.
- 1931 – Zarya Vostoka building constructed.
- 1933 – Jewish Historic-Ethnographic Museum founded.
- 1935 – Central Stadium opens.
- 1936
  - City becomes capital of Georgian Soviet Socialist Republic.
  - City name changed from "Tiflis" to "Tbilisi."
- 1939
  - Rustaveli cinema opens.
  - Didube Pantheon (cemetery) established.
- 1941
  - Georgian SSR Academy of Sciences and Tbilisi Aircraft State Association established.
- 1946 – Vake Park opens.
- 1950 – Art Museum of Georgia active.
- 1951 – Donkey Bridge rebuilt.
- 1952 – Airport and Poet's Bridge, Tbilisi built.
- 1953 – Didube bridge built.
- 1956 – March: Anti-de-Stalinization demonstrations.
- 1958 – Institute of Manuscripts established.

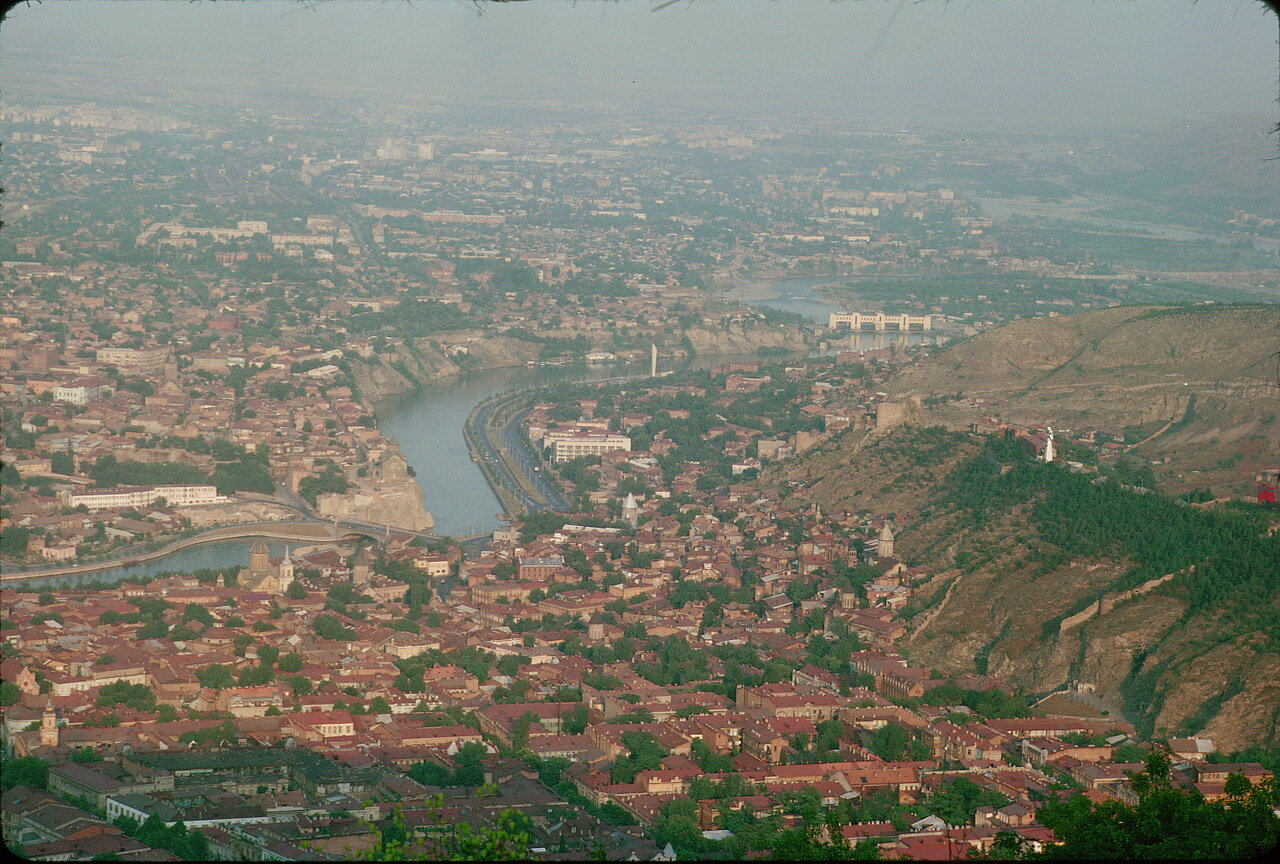
Tbilisi in the 1960s

- 1961 – Tbilisi Sports Palace opens.
- 1965 – Tbilisi co-hosts the EuroBasket 1965.
- 1966
  - Tbilisi Metro begins operating.
  - Baratashvili Bridge constructed.
  - Open Air Museum of Ethnography founded.
- 1967 – Hotel Iveria built.
- 1970 – Saburtalo Pantheon (cemetery) established.
- 1972 – Tbilisi TV Broadcasting Tower erected.
- 1973 - Tbilisi National Park established
- 1974 – Human Rights Defence Group formed.
- 1975
  - Tbilisi Roads Ministry Building constructed.
  - Bank of Georgia headquarters built.
- 1976 – Boris Paichadze Stadium opens.
- 1978 – April: Demonstrations about constitutional status of Georgian language.
- 1979
  - Tbilisoba begins.
  - Population: 1,052,734.
- 1980 – March: Rock music festival held.
- 1983 – Republic Square constructed.
- 1984
  - Wedding Palace built.
  - December: Gas explosion.
- 1989
  - 9 April: Anti-Soviet Demonstration quashed.
  - 13 April: Church of the Red Gospel destroyed.

=== 1990s ===
- 1990
  - June: Aerial tramway accident.
  - Population: 1,268,000 (estimate).
- 1991
  - April: Georgia declares independence from USSR.
  - December: Conflict between pro-Gamsakhurdia and Opposition forces.
  - Georgian Academy of Agrarian Sciences founded.
  - Ordzhonikidze Square renamed "26 May Square."
- 1992
  - January: Conflict between pro-Gamsakhurdia and Opposition forces.
  - Otar Litanishvili becomes mayor.
- 1993
  - Konstantine Gabashvili becomes mayor, succeeded by Nikoloz Lekishvili.
  - Apostolic Administration of the Caucasus established and headquartered in Tbilisi.
- 1995
  - Abkhazian Regional Academy of Sciences founded.
  - Badri Shoshitaishvili becomes mayor.
- 1996 – National Parliamentary Library of Georgia headquartered in city.
- 1998
  - Vano Zodelava becomes mayor.
  - Telasi privatized.
- 2000 – Basiani choir formed.

== 21st century ==
- 2001
  - Mikheil Meskhi Stadium built.
  - TbilAviaMsheni airline based in Tbilisi.
- 2002
  - April 25: The 4.8 mb Tbilisi earthquake shook the area with a maximum MSK intensity of VII–VIII (Very strong – Damaging), causing 5–6 deaths and 52–70 injuries. Damage was estimated at $160–350 million.
  - Tbilisi Aircraft Manufacturing privatized.
  - Population: 1,081,679.
- 2003 – November: Rose Revolution.
- 2004
  - Holy Trinity Cathedral (Sameba) built.
  - Zurab Tchiaberashvili becomes mayor.
  - Caucasus University established.
- 2005 – Giorgi Ugulava becomes mayor.
- 2006
  - March: Protest against 2006 Russian ban of Moldovan and Georgian wines.
  - Baku–Tbilisi–Ceyhan pipeline in operation.
  - National Science Library (Georgia), Scouts of Tbilisi, and Museum of Soviet Occupation established.
  - Freedom Monument erected in Freedom Square.
- 2007
  - Demonstrations against Saakashvili regime.
  - Old Tbilisi raion established.
  - Free University of Tbilisi and Radio Muza founded.
- 2008 – August: Bombing by Russian Air Force during Russo-Georgian War.
- 2009
  - Demonstrations against Saakashvili regime.
  - Tbilisi Open Air (music festival), Tbilisi International Festival of Theatre, and Tbilisi Fashion Week begin.
  - April: Tbilisi hosts the 2009 European Judo Championships.
- 2010 – Bridge of Peace (pedestrian bridge) built.
- 2011 – May: Demonstration against Saakashvili regime.
- 2012
  - 13 February: Bomb attempt foiled.
  - April: Lech Kaczyński monument unveiled.
  - May: Anti-government demonstration.
  - Population: 1,473,551.
- 2013 – Tbilisi hosts the 2013 European Wrestling Championships.
- 2014 – Sister city partnership signed between Tbilisi and Lublin, Poland.

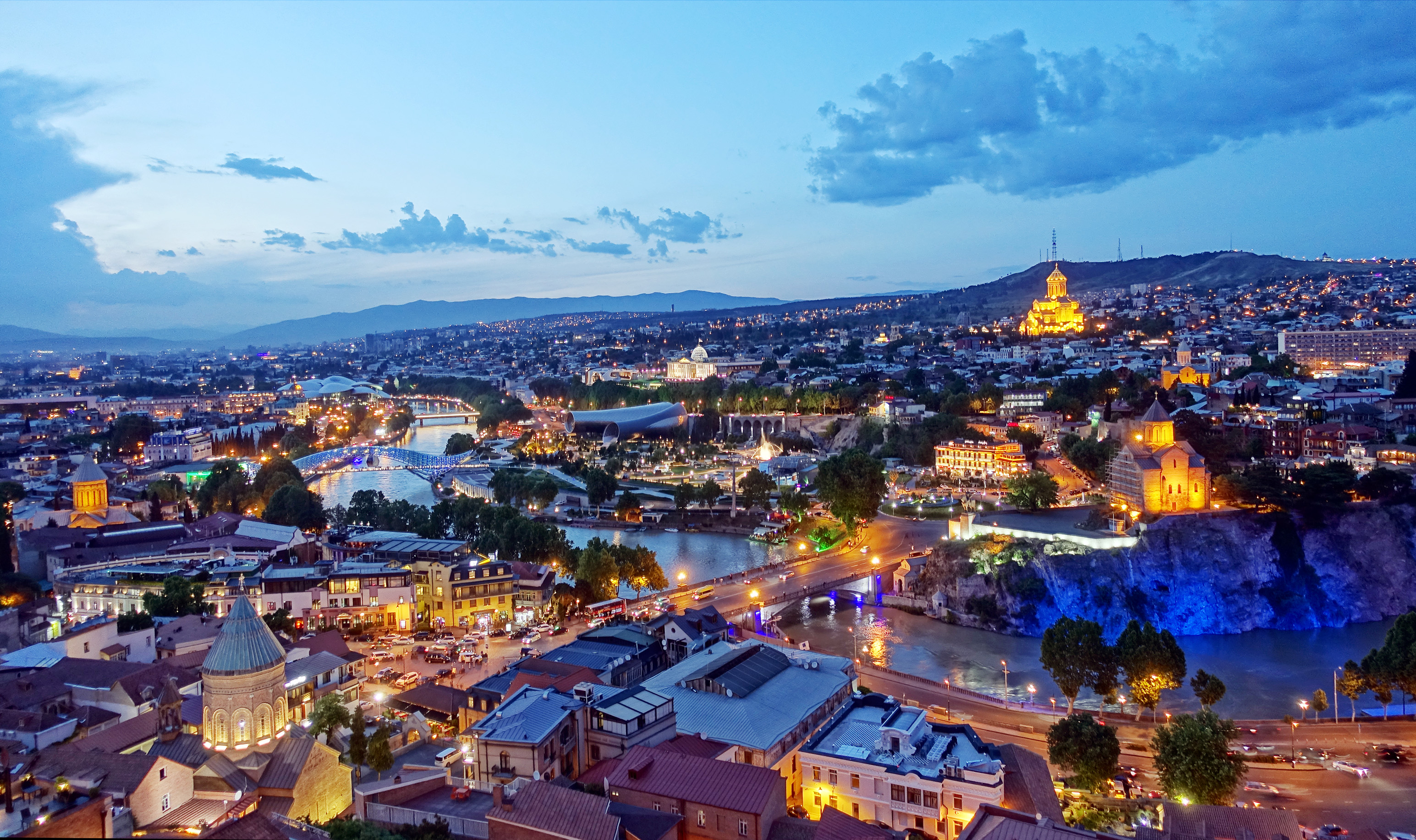
Tbilisi in 2018

- 2015
  - April: Tbilisi hosts the 2015 European Weightlifting Championships.
  - 14 June: Flooding in the Vere river results in at least 12 deaths and devastates the city's zoo.
- 2017
  - Tbilisi International Airport established.
  - June: Tbilisi hosts the 2017 European Fencing Championships.
  - September–October: Tbilisi co-hosts the 2017 Women's European Volleyball Championship.
  - November: Tbilisi hosts the Junior Eurovision Song Contest 2017.
- 2018 – 5 November: Polish Library and Polish Institute in Tbilisi opened (see also Georgia–Poland relations).
- 2022 – Tbilisi co-hosts the EuroBasket 2022.
- 2025 – Tbilisi hosts the Junior Eurovision Song Contest 2025.

== See also ==
- History of Tbilisi
- Other names of Tbilisi
- List of mayors of Tbilisi
- List of museums in Tbilisi
- Timeline of Georgian history

== Bibliography ==
Published in 19th century

- H. A. S. Dearborn (1819), "Teflis", A Memoir on the Commerce and Navigation of the Black Sea, Boston: Wells & Lilly
- Vakhushti Bagrationi (1842), "Description du Karthli", Description géographique de la Géorgie (in French), S. Pétersbourg: A la typographie de l'academie
- "Tiflis". Hand-book for Travellers in Russia, Poland, and Finland (2nd ed.). London: John Murray. 1868.
- Walter B. Harris (1896), "Tiflis", From Batum to Baghdad, viâ Tiflis, Tabriz, and Persian Kurdistan, Edinburgh: W. Blackwood and Sons, OCLC 3234774

Published in 20th century

- Kropotkin, Peter Alexeivitch; Bealby, John Thomas (1910). "Tiflis (town)" . Encyclopædia Britannica. Vol. 26 (11th ed.). pp. 966–967.
- Benjamin Vincent (1910), "Tiflis", Haydn's Dictionary of Dates (25th ed.), London: Ward, Lock & Co., hdl:2027/loc.ark:/13960/t89g6g776 – via HathiTrust
- William Eleroy Curtis (1911). "City of Tiflis". Around the Black Sea. New York: Hodder & Stoughton. hdl:2027/uc2.ark:/13960/t3222tf2d.
- "Tiflis", Russia, Leipzig: Karl Baedeker, 1914, OCLC 1328163
- William Henry Beable (1919), "Tiflis", Russian Gazetteer and Guide, London: Russian Outlook
- Trudy Ring, ed. (1995). "Tbilisi". International Dictionary of Historic Places: Northern Europe. Routledge. ISBN 978-1-136-63944-9.

Published in 21st century

- Madlen Pilz (2011), "Tbilisi in City-Maps: Symbolic Construction of an Urban Landscape", in Tsypylma Darieva; et al. (eds.), Urban Spaces after Socialism, Frankfurt am Main: Campus, ISBN 978-3-593-39384-1
