= Vano Zodelava =

Georgian politician (1957–2019)

Ivane Zodelava
- ივანე ზოდელავა
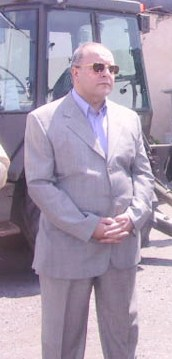
- Zodelava in 2003

Mayor of Tbilisi
- In office 10 August 1998 – 19 April 2004
- President: Eduard Shevardnadze; Mikheil Saakashvili
- Preceded by: Badri Shoshitaishvili
- Succeeded by: Zurab Chiaberashvili

Personal details
- Born: May 2, 1957 Tbilisi, Georgian SSR, Soviet Union (now Georgia)
- Died: February 5, 2019 (aged 61) Tbilisi
- Party: Union of Citizens of Georgia
- Education: Tbilisi State University

Ivane "Vano" Zodelava (Georgian: ივანე [ვანო] ზოდელავა; 2 May 1957 – 5 February 2019) was a Georgian politician who served as Mayor of Tbilisi from 10 August 1998 to 19 April 2004.

== Early career ==
Born in Tbilisi, the capital of then-Soviet Georgia, Zodelava graduated from the Tbilisi State University (TSU) with a degree in engineering in 1978. After a brief academic career at the TSU, he became involved with the Komsomol, a Communist political youth organization in the Soviet Union in 1981. He advanced through the Communist Party ranks and served as head of the Ordzhonikidze district in Tbilisi from 1990 to 1991. After the dissolution of the Soviet Union, Zodelava was involved in private entrepreneurship before becoming head of the Tbilisi Revenue Inspection service in 1996 and Deputy Premier of the Tbilisi Municipality in 1997. He then served as mayor of Poti, a maritime city in western Georgia, from 1997 to 1998.

== Mayor of Tbilisi ==
On 10 August 1998, President Eduard Shevardnadze appointed Zodelava mayor of Tbilisi. He tenure was marked by continued social and economic challenges to the capital, such as frequent power outages, as well as damage to the city's infrastructure due to the 2002 Tbilisi earthquake. After the 2002 Georgian local elections, Zodelava's rule was challenged by the opposition-dominated Tbilisi City Assembly, then chaired by the young reformist politician Mikheil Saakashvili. The opposition accused Zodelava of corruption and campaigned for the mayor's dismissal, and/or impeachment. On 15 November 2002, the Assembly passed a vote of no confidence in the mayor. As a result, most members of the city government resigned. However, the Assembly lacked legal power to sack the mayor, who, at that time, was appointed directly by the president. Shevardnadze refused to replace Zodelava, who then stood by the president's side in the controversial November 2003 parliamentary election. Following Shevardnadze's resignation on 23 November 2003 in the course of the bloodless Rose Revolution, Zodelava remained in his position until 19 April 2004, when the newly elected President Mikheil Saakashvili dismissed Zodelava and appointed Zurab Chiaberashvili in his stead.

After 2004, Zodeleva distanced himself from politics. He was severely injured in a car accident near Tbilisi in July 2017 and died in coma on 5 February 2019.
