= Mayor of Tbilisi =

- თბილისის მერი
- Seal of Tbilisi
- Incumbent; Kakha Kaladze since 13 November 2017
- Type: Mayor
- Reports to: Tbilisi City Assembly
- Seat: Tbilisi City Hall Building, Tbilisi, Georgia
- Appointer: Direct popular vote (2010-Present)
- Term length: 4 years
- Constituting instrument: Organic Law Of Georgia – Local Self-Government Code
- Inaugural holder: Hovhannes (Ivan) Izmiryants (as Head of Tiflis); Tamaz Vashadze (as Mayor of Tbilisi)
- Formation: 1840; 186 years ago (Head Of Tiflis); 2 October 1991; 34 years ago (Mayor of Tbilisi)
- Website: tbilisi.gov.ge

The Mayor of Tbilisi is an elected politician in Tbilisi. Before 2005 the mayors used to be appointed by the central government. In 2006 first mayoral elections were held in the history of the Republic of Georgia. The first elected mayor of Tbilisi is Giorgi (Gigi) Ugulava who was re-elected in 2006 after one year of being on the position of an appointed Mayor of Tbilisi.

== The role ==
The Mayor is responsible for budgeting and strategic planning of some governmental functions across whole Tbilisi. The plans of the mayor are scrutinised by the Tbilisi Assembly (Sakrebulo) and actioned by the different governmental bodies of the Tbilisi City Hall.

== List of mayors (1991–) ==
1. Tamaz Vashadze: 2 October 1991 – 6 January 1992
2. Otar Litanishvili: 6 January 1992 – 21 January 1993
3. Konstantine Gabashvili: 21 January 1993 – 16 October 1993
4. Nikoloz Lekishvili: 16 October 1993 – 8 December 1995
5. Badri Shoshitaishvili: 8 December 1995 – 8 August 1998
6. Ivane (Vano) Zodelava: 10 August 1998 – 19 April 2004
7. Zurab Tchiaberashvili: 19 April 2004 – 12 July 2005
8. Gigi Ugulava: 12 July 2005 – 12 October 2006

Gigi Ugulava: 12 October 2006 – 30 May 2010
Gigi Ugulava: 30 May 2010 – 22 December 2013
Sevdia Ugrekhelidze (acting): 22 December 2013 – 2 August 2014

9. David Narmania: 2 August 2014 – 13 November 2017
10. Kakha Kaladze: 13 November 2017 – 30 October, 2021

Kakha Kaladze: 30 October, 2021 – 29 October, 2025
Kakha Kaladze: 29 October, 2025 –

== History ==
Due to the sizable Armenian population of Tbilisi in 19th and 20th centuries, the office of mayor was chiefly occupied by the local Armenians, with the exception of several Georgian mayors, such as Dimitri Kipiani, Vasil Cherkezishvili and Benia Chkhikvishvili.

Rank	Mayor	Duration
1	Hovhannes (Ivan) Izmiryants	1840–1843
2	Stepan Gabrielyan Khatisyans	1844–1845
3	Movses Ter-Grigoryants	1845–1846
4	Hovhannes Simonyants Shadinyan	1847–1848
5	Tovmas Davtyan Pridonyants	1848–1849
6	Zakaria Stepanyan Amiraghyants	1850–1851
7	Hovsep Afanasyan Mirijanyants	1851–1852
8	Avetik Astvatsatryan(Bogdani) Sveshnikov	1853–1856
9	Soghomon Davtyan Sarajev	1856–1857
10	Andrey Davtyan Mananov	1857–1858
11	Vardan Astvatsatryan Arshakuni	1858–1860
12	Soghomon Zakaryan Abisoghomyan	1860–1861; 1865–1866
13	Soghomon Mirimanyan Mirimanyants	1861–1862
14	Gevorg (Egor) Grigoryan Pridonyants	1862–1864
15	Galust Harutyunyan Shermazan-Vardanyants	1864–1865
16	Eremya Gevogyan Artsruni	1866–1868
17	Nikoghayos Hovhannisyan Aladatyants	1868–1869
18	Dmitriy Tumanyants	1869–1870
19	Yazon Dmitryan Tumanyants	1870–1874
20	Dimitri Ivanes Dze Kipiani	1878–1879
21	Anton Soghomonyan Ghorghanyants	1879
22	Aleksandr Stepanyan Matinyants	1879–1891
23	Nikoghayos Barseghyan Arghutyants-Erkaynabazuk	1891–1893; 1895–1898; 1903–1904
24	Poghos Aleksandryan Izmayilyan	1893–1895
25	Gevorg Grigoryan Evangulyan	1897–1901
26	Aleksandr Mikaelyan Arghutyan-Erkaynabazuk Arghuntyants	1902
27	Krostopor Svakumyan Vermishyants	1904–1905
28	Vasil Nikolozis Dze Cherkezishvili	1907–1909
29	Alexander Khatisyan	1910–1917
30	Benia Chkhikvishvili	1918–1921

== See also ==
- Timeline of Tbilisi
