= Grato Passage =

- Interactive map of the Grato Passage area

General information
- Status: Completed
- Type: Mixed Use
- Location: 37-39 Merab Kostava St, Tbilisi 0179, Georgia
- Coordinates: 41°42′30″N 44°47′10″E
- Opening: 2010

Design and construction
- Architects: AG & Partners
- Developer: Benett and Benett Capital

Website
- www.grato.ge

Grato Passage is an 8-storey mixed use building located at 37 Kostava street in Vera district of Tbilisi, Georgia. The building includes office and retail space in its 8450 square metres of floor areas as well as a parking for 100 cars. Construction was completed in 2010. Developed by Benett and Benett Capital Ltd and designed by architectural firm AG & Partners the building facade consists of white travertine stone and light textured burgundy bricks. Building is connected to Philharmonic hall through a glassed walking bridge, which is the only one of its kind in the city.

In 2010, just before the construction was finished, Grato hosted Tbilisi Fashion Week. Its unfinished interior was used as a backdrop for fashion shows.

== References in popular culture ==
- GRATO presents Tbilisi Fashion Week
