= Davit Narmania =

Georgian politician and economist

- დავით ნარმანია
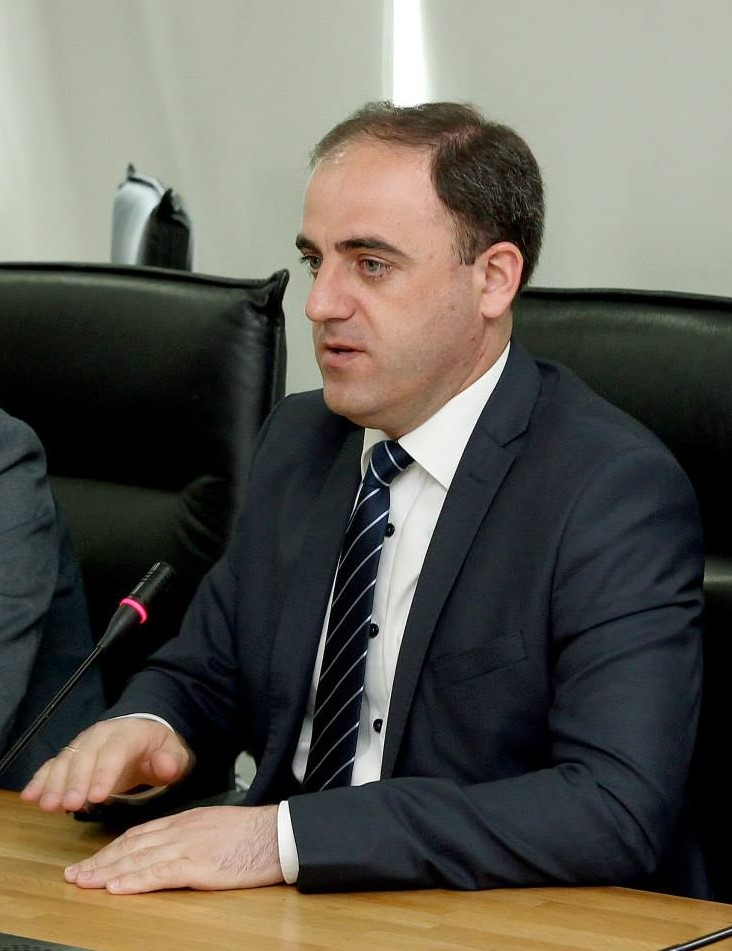

9th Mayor of Tbilisi
- In office 2 August 2014 – 13 November 2017
- President: Giorgi Margvelashvili
- Prime Minister: Irakli Garibashvili; Giorgi Kvirikashvili
- Preceded by: Sevdia Ugrekhelidze (acting)
- Succeeded by: Kakha Kaladze

Personal details
- Born: 7 March 1979 (age 47) Zugdidi, Georgian SSR, Soviet Union
- Party: Georgian Dream

Davit Narmania (Georgian: დავით ნარმანია; born 7 March 1979) is a Chairperson at Georgian National Energy and Water Supply Regulatory Commission (GNERC) since 2019. He is a formar Georgian politician and the former Mayor of Tbilisi, the capital of Georgia, from 2014 to 2017. An economist with an academic background, he was Minister of Regional Development and Infrastructure of Georgia from 2012 to 2014. He won the mayoral race in Tbilisi as the ruling Georgian Dream coalition candidate in July 2014.

== Early career ==
Davit Narmania was born in 1979 in Zugdidi in then-Soviet Georgia. He graduated from the Tbilisi State University (TSU) with a degree in economics in 1996 and obtained a PhD from his alma mater in 2005. He worked for various governmental, non-governmental, and private organizations from 2001 to 2012 and lectured in economics at the Georgian Institute of Public Affairs and TSU. He was a co-founder of the NGO Caucasian Institute for Economic and Social Research and an executive director from 2009 to 2012.

== Government minister ==
In 2012, Narmania joined the Georgian Dream (GD) coalition led by the tycoon Bidzina Ivanishvili and devised the coalition's pre-election economic program. After the GD's victory in the October 2012 parliamentary election, Narmania assumed the office of Minister of Regional Development and Infrastructure. At that time, the incoming cabinet planned to dissolve the ministry; Narmania's portfolio was considered temporary, and it was planned to move him to the position of First Deputy Minister of Finances. Yet, Narmania served as Minister of Regional Development and Infrastructure until his resignation on 14 April 2014 on the occasion of his nomination as the GD's candidate for the Mayor of Tbilisi at the scheduled June 2014 local elections.

== Mayoral candidate ==
Narmania's candidacy for the capital's mayor was selected by Bidzina Ivanishvili shortly before his resignation as Prime Minister and officially announced by the GD in November 2013. Several politicians and commentators, including the GD members, were skeptical of Narmania's chances to win because he was not a native of Tbilisi. Narmania's campaign was based on promises to plant one million trees in Tbilisi to bolster the city's dwindling green space, expand drainage systems, create more recreational areas, and encourage small and medium-sized businesses.

With Narmania garnering 46.09% of the vote in the 15 June 2014 election, the race went into a second-round runoff held on 12 July and was won by him with 72.47% of the vote, while his principal rival and runner-up, Nika Melia of the United National Movement (UNM), received 27.53%. Melia conceded his defeat, but he claimed the voting process was influenced by the controversial arrest, on 1 July, of Tbilisi's ex-Mayor Gigi Ugulava, who spearheaded the UNM's election campaign. The election was marked by another controversy over the involvement of Narmania's mother, Nora Todua, in the voting process in the village of Koki, Zugdidi Municipality; a video released by the UNM depicted Todua, a local election commission member, asking a voter at the precinct to show her a marked ballot paper. Commenting on the issue, Narmania said his mother did not violate the law and was "only motivated by motherly care". The Zugdidi Election Commission eventually issued a warning to Todua.

== Mayor of Tbilisi ==
Narmania assumed his new office on 2 August 2014, becoming the 9th Mayor of Tbilisi.
