= Timeline of Georgian history =

This is a timeline of Georgian history, comprising important legal and territorial changes and political events in Georgia and its predecessor states. To read about the background to these events, see History of Georgia. See also the List of monarchs of Georgia.

== 6200 BC - 4000 BC ==
Event
Shulaveri-Shomu culture: a late Neolithic/Eneolithic culture that existed on the territory of present-day Georgia, Azerbaijan and the Armenian Highlands. The culture is dated to mid-6th or early-5th millennia BC and is thought to be one of the earliest known Neolithic cultures; started in c.6000 BC and lasted until 4000 BC.

== 4000 BC - 2200 BC ==
Event
Trialeti culture. The Trialeti age was a second culture to appear in what is present-day Georgia, after the Shulaveri age and it lasted from 4000 BC to 2200 BC.

== 3400 BC - 2000 BC ==
Event
Kura-Araxes culture. It mostly encompassed, on modern-day territories, the Southern Caucasus (except western Georgia), northwestern Iran, the northeastern Caucasus, eastern Turkey, and as far as Syria.

== 2500 BC - 760 BC ==
Event
Diauehi. A coalition of tribes, or kingdoms, located in northeastern Anatolia, that was formed in the 12th century BC in the post-Hittite period. It is mentioned in the Urartian inscriptions. It is usually (though not always) identified with Daiaeni of the Yonjalu inscription of the Assyrian king Tiglath-Pileser I's third year (1118 BC). Diauehi is a possible locus of proto-Kartvelian; it has been described as an "important tribal formation of possible proto-Georgians" by Ronald Grigor Suny (1994).

== 1200 BC - 600 BC ==
Event
Colchian culture. Late Bronze Age and Iron Age culture of the western Caucasus, mostly in what is present-day western Georgia.

== 1112 BC ==
Event
King Sien of Diauehi leads a large tribal coalition of tribes to stall Assyrian advances. He is captured by Assyrians, forcibly submitted to King Tiglath-Pileser I and later released on terms of vassalage. Tribal alliance of 20,000 Mushks commanded by 5 kings and Kaskian warriors is also defeated by Assyrians in the same year.

== 760 BC ==
Event
Despite numerous attempts of its King Utupurshi of Diauehi to salvage the nation, Diauehi is finally destroyed by the emerging power of Urartu. It is partitioned between Urartu and the entity of Colchis.

== 700 BC ==
Event
Cimmerians and Scythians invade Georgia and the Caucasus. Kingdom of Colchis develops in this age. Later on, Cimmerians play an influential role in the development of both Iberian and Colchian states.
Ancient Greek colonization of the Black Sea begins. Greeks establish a number of colonies on Colchian coast, namely: Phasis, Dioscurias, Pityus, Gyenos and few others.

== 600 BC ==
Event
Kingdom of Colchis appears. Described as being "the earliest Georgian formation", it was kingdom and region in Western Georgia, which played an important role in the ethnic and cultural formation of the Georgians. The Kingdom of Colchis, which existed from the 6th to the 1st centuries BC is regarded as another Georgian state and the term Colchians was used as the collective term for tribes which populated the eastern coast of the Black Sea. Colchis was populated by Colchians, an early Lazuri speaking tribe, ancestral to the contemporary Western Georgians, namely Svans and Mingrelians, as well as the related Lazs.

== 500 BC ==
Event
Colchians are mentioned in the Histories of Herodotus alongside Persians and Medes which undoubtedly points out their significant role as well as famed strength renowned throughout the Ancient World.

== 302 BC ==
Event
Kingdom of Iberia, centred in what is present-day eastern Georgia, is founded as an official monarchy by its first king Pharnavaz I of Iberia, after defeating Azo, his predecessor and usurper to the throne. Pharnabazid dynasty is established.
Xenophon, a Greek mercenary and distinguished historical writer of Antiquity, passes through the area later known as Pontus. Recordings of his journey prove invaluable to the early Georgian history and ethnography. Xenophon described the following Proto-Georgian tribes: Chalybes, Drilae, Macrones, Mossynoeci, Phasians, Taochi, Tibareni and others.

== 284 BC ==
Event
According to traditional accounts, Georgian alphabet is created by the King Pharnavaz I of Iberia for the Georgian language.

== 90 BC ==
Event
Artaxiad dynasty begins reigning in Iberia.

== 65 BC ==
Event
Pompey's Georgian campaign. Pompey the Great subjugates the Kingdom of Iberia and makes western Georgian Kingdom of Colchis a Roman province.

== 1st century ==
Year	Date	Event
30 AD		Pharnabazid dynasty is restored to the Iberian throne.

== 2nd century ==
Year	Date	Event
117-138 AD		Kingdom of Iberia reaches its peak with the reign of King Pharasmanes II of Iberia, who manages to install his brother Mithridates on the Armenian throne, who is later deposed and replaced by his nephew Rhadamistus. The possibility of uniting the two kingdoms is finally shattered by Parthian invasion and Rhadamistus is overthrown.
189 AD		Arsacid dynasty of Iberia succeeds the Pharnabazids.

== 3rd century ==
Year	Date	Event
270 AD		Anti-Roman uprising in Colchis.
284 AD		Chosroid dynasty, a branch of the House of Mihran, begins reigning over the Kingdom of Iberia.

== 4th century ==
Year	Date	Event
319 AD, 326 AD or 337 AD		King Mirian III of Iberia declares Christianity in Caucasian Iberia (eastern Georgia) as an official religion.

== 5th century ==
Year	Date	Event
482-502 AD		Vakhtang I of Iberia fights against growing Persian domination and renewed attempts of forcible conversion of Iberia, Armenia and Albania to Zoroastrianism.
560s, 570s AD		Khosrow I abolishes the king as a title of the Iberian ruler and incorporates Iberia into his Empire. Iberia becomes a mere province.
580 AD		Death of Bacurius, the last Chosroid ruler of Iberia and subsequent abolition of Iberian monarchy by Persians.
588 AD		After the abolition of the monarchy by Sassanid Empire, Principate of Iberia is established with Guaram I of Iberia as its first ruler.

== 6th century ==
Year	Date	Event
526-532 AD		Iberian War
541-562 AD		Lazic War

== 7th century ==
Year	Date	Event
627 AD		Third Perso-Turkic War - Tbilisi, capital of the Principate of Iberia, whose ruler Stephen I of Iberia is an ally of the Khosrau II, is sacked by the combined forces of Turks and Byzantines.
654 AD		First entry of Arabs into Georgian lands. Principate of Iberia, unable to resist the invaders on its own, surrenders and accepts the terms of vassalage.

== 8th century ==
Year	Date	Event
735-737 AD		Marwan ibn Muhammad's invasion of Georgia

== 9th century ==
Year	Date	Event
AD		

== 10th century ==
Year	Date	Event
1000 AD		Bagrat III of Georgia establishes the Kingdom of Georgia.

== 11th century ==
Year	Date	Event
1040 AD		Seljuk Turks invade Georgia.
1071 AD		Byzantine-Georgian armies are defeated by Seljuk Turks at the Battle of Manzikert.
1089 AD		At the age 16 King David IV of Georgia inherits the throne and organizes the army to combat the Seljuk invaders.

== 12th century ==
Year	Date	Event
1121 AD		At the Battle of Didgori Seljuks are defeated by the Georgians. Tbilisi and other Georgian lands go back to Georgia.

== 13th century ==
Year	Date	Event
1204 AD		Queen Tamar of Georgia conquers Black Sea coast of Byzantine Empire and Empire of Trebizond is created. She puts there as emperor her own relative Prince Alexios Komnenos.

== 14th century ==
Year	Date	Event
AD		

== 15th century ==
Year	Date	Event
1400 AD		Timur invades Georgia, destroying most of the towns in western Georgia. Around 60,000 survivors were taken back to the Timurid Empire as slaves.
1463		Self-declared King of Imereti Bagrat VI defeats George VIII forces in the Battle of Chikhori and ensures his power.
1483		Self-declared Atabeg of Samtskhe Qvarqvare II Jaqeli assaults royal forces and defeats them in the Battle of Aradeti, therefore ensuring his power. Kingdom of Georgia finally collapses.
1490		Governors of Kartli finally recognizes dissolution of Kingdom of Georgia.

== 16th century ==
Year	Date	Event
AD		

== 17th century ==
Year	Date	Event
AD		

== 18th century ==
Year	Date	Event
July 24, 1783 AD		The Treaty of Georgievsk is signed between the Kingdom of Kartli-Kakheti and the Russian Empire, making Kartli-Kakheti a protectorate of Russia.
1795 AD		Agha Mohammed Khan invades Georgia, capturing and sacking Tbilisi. Eastern Georgia briefly re-occupied by the Iranians.
1798 AD		Civil war breaks out within Kartli following the death of Erekle II over the succession to the throne of Kartli, eventually taken by George XII.
1799 AD		Russians enter Tbilisi.

== 19th century ==
Year	Date	Event
January 8, 1801 AD		Tsar Paul I of Russia signs a decree on incorporating Kartli-Kakheti into Russia, confirmed by Alexander I on 12 September the same year.
1810		Russian Army invades and annexes Kingdom of Imereti.
18 July 1811		Autocephaly of Georgian Orthodox Church was quashed on order of the Tsar.
24 October 1813 AD		Treaty of Gulistan signed between Qajar Iran and the Russian Empire, ending the Russo-Iranian War of 1804–1813. Eastern Georgia officially ceded by the Iranians to Russia.
9 September 1829		David Gurieli was proclaimed deposed by the Russian authorities and Principality of Guria was directly annexed by Russian Empire.
1858		Principality of Svaneti was abolished by the Russian authorities and was converted into a district of Russian Empire.
1864		Principality of Abkhazia was abolished and incorporated in the Russian Empire, whereas Prince Mikhail Shervashidze was forced to reject his rights and resettle in Voronezh.
1867		Niko Dadiani was deposed and Principality of Mingrelia was abolished and incorporated in the Russian Empire.
13 July 1878		Treaty of Berlin was signed in the aftermath of the Russo-Turkish War. The Ottomans were forced to cede Adjara to the expanding Russian Empire.

== 20th century ==
Year	Date	Event
1918	22 April	Transcaucasian Democratic Federative Republic established.
1918	28 May	Transcaucasian Democratic Federative Republic disestablished.
1918	26 May	Democratic Republic of Georgia established.
1921	25 February	Democratic Republic of Georgia annexed by the Bolshevik forces of the Soviet Union, following an invasion which begin 14 days earlier on the 11th.
1978	14 April	A wave of demonstrations were held in Tbilisi to protest adopting a new constitution of the Soviet Georgia, no longer declaring Georgian to be the sole state language. Protests resulted in retaining the previous status of the Georgian language.
9 April 1989		Soviet forces disperse demonstrations in Tbilisi, leaving 21 civilians killed.
9 April 1991		Georgia declares independence from the Soviet Union, finalized on 25 December the same year.
May 1991		Zviad Gamsakhurdia elected as the first President of Georgia.
1991-1992		Zviad Gamsakhurdia overthrowed by the military junta.
1991-1993		Georgian Civil War takes place.
1991-1992		South Ossetia War.
1992-1993		War in Abkhazia.
November 1995		Eduard Shevardnadze elected as the President of Georgia.

== 21st century ==
Year	Date	Event
November 2003		The Rose Revolution resulted in overthrow of incumbent President Eduard Shevardnadze.
January 2004		Mikheil Saakashvili elected as the new President of Georgia.
May 2004		The Adjara Revolution restored semi-independent region under control of the central government of Georgia.
August 2008		Russo-Georgian War.
October 2012		Georgian Dream defeats the United National Movement party of incumbent President Mikheil Saakashvili in the parliamentary election.

== See also ==
- Timeline of Tbilisi
