= Giorgi Ugulava =

Georgian politician

- გიორგი უგულავა

8th Mayor of Tbilisi
- In office 12 July 2005 – 22 December 2013
- President: Mikheil Saakashvili; Nino Burjanadze (acting); Mikheil Saakashvili; Giorgi Margvelashvili
- Prime Minister: Zurab Nogaideli; Giorgi Baramidze (acting); Lado Gurgenidze; Grigol Mgaloblishvili; Nika Gilauri; Vano Merabishvili; Bidzina Ivanishvili; Irakli Garibashvili
- Preceded by: Zurab Tchiaberashvili
- Succeeded by: Sevdia Ugrekhelidze (acting)

Head Of the Administration of the President of Georgia
- In office 20 April 2005 – 12 July 2005
- President: Mikheil Saakashvili
- Succeeded by: Giorgi Arveladze

Governor Of Samegrelo-Zemo Svaneti
- In office 2004–2004
- Preceded by: Leri Chitanava
- Succeeded by: Mikheil Ardia

Secretary-General of European Georgia
- In office January 2017 – 2021

Personal details
- Born: 15 August 1975 (age 50) Tbilisi, Georgian SSR, Soviet Union
- Party: Independent (2021–present)
- Other political affiliations: European Georgia (2017–2021); United National Movement (2003–2017)
- Children: 3

Giorgi "Gigi" Ugulava (Georgian: გიგი უგულავა) (born August 15, 1975) is a Georgian politician and the former Mayor of Tbilisi (2005–2013). He was one of the former leaders of the United National Movement (UNM) party and former close ally of the former president of Georgia Mikheil Saakashvili. On 10 February 2020, he was sentenced to 3 years in prison . However, on May 15, President Salome Zourabichvili pardoned Ugulava.

== Early career ==
Born in Tbilisi, Ugulava studied at the Tbilisi Theological Seminary (1992-4) and the University of Saarbrücken (1995-7), and graduated from the Faculty of Philosophy and Sociology at the Tbilisi State University in 1998. Having briefly worked as a journalist for a Tbilisi-based Iberia TV, Internews, and Transparency International (1997-9), he became a consultant for the Eurasia Foundation in 2000. He directed the World Bank Association of Legal and Public Education from 2001 to 2003, and helped organize the youth organization Kmara! ("Enough"). The Kmara movement played a critical role in the bloodless Rose Revolution, which would bring the reformist leader Mikheil Saakashvili to power. Ugulava assumed the position of Deputy Security Minister in the new government and was moved to the post of Governor of Samegrelo-Zemo Svaneti in September 2004. On April 20, 2005, he was appointed Chief of the Administration of the president of Georgia.

== Mayor of Tbilisi ==
Ugulava was appointed Mayor of Tbilisi on July 12, 2005. When this post became elective in 2006, he ran successfully for mayor, and was elected by the Tbilisi Assembly on October 12, 2006 and re-elected through a direct vote on May 30, 2010. After the UNM-dominated central government was defeated by the Georgian Dream coalition in the 2012 parliamentary election, Ugulava was suspended on 22 December 2013 from his functions by a court for alleged misuse of funds. He was arrested on July 3, 2014 on charges of money misspending and laundering in the funding of his party's campaign in June municipal elections. His supporters accused the government of politically motivated persecution of Ugulava. On 18 September 2015 a court sentenced him to 4.5 years in jail.

On 6 January 2017, Ugulava was released from prison after the Tbilisi Court of Appeal requalified the misspending charges, found him guilty of exceeding official powers, acquitted him of money laundering charges, and shortened his sentence by three years and three months.

Shortly after his release he (along with several other senior members of the UNM) left the United National Movement to found a new political party: Movement for Freedom - European Georgia. The split occurred due to ideological and political differences.
