= Arab rule in Georgia =

Medieval Arab-Muslim conquests in Georgia

Arab rule in Georgia, natively known as Araboba (Georgian: არაბობა), refers to the period in the history of Georgia when parts of what is now Georgia came under Arab rule, starting with the first Arab incursions in the mid-7th century until the final defeat of the Emirate of Tbilisi at the hands of King David IV in 1122. Compared with other regions which endured Muslim conquests, Georgia's culture, and even political structure was not much affected by the Arab presence, as the people kept their faith, the nobles their fiefdoms, and the foreign rulers mostly insisted on the payment of tribute, which they could not always enforce. Still, repeated invasions and military campaigns by the Arabs devastated Georgia on many occasions, and the Caliphs retained suzerainty over significant parts of the country and exerted influence over the internal power dynamics during most of the period.

The history of Arab rule in Georgia can be divided into three main periods: from the first appearance of Arab armies around 645 until the establishment of the Emirate of Tbilisi in 736. Those years saw the progressive installation of political control over the Georgian lands by the Umayyad Caliphate; from 736 until 853, when the Abbasid Caliphate of Baghdad destroyed Tbilisi to quell a rebellion by the local emir, ending a period of domination of all Eastern Georgia by the Emirate; from 853 until the 2nd half of the 11th century, when the Great Seljuq Empire replaced the Arabs as the main force in the Middle East. Before that, the power of the emirate of Tbilisi had already declined in favor of independent Georgian states. Tbilisi remained, however, under Arab rule until 1122.

== First conquests and installation of Arab domination (645–736) ==
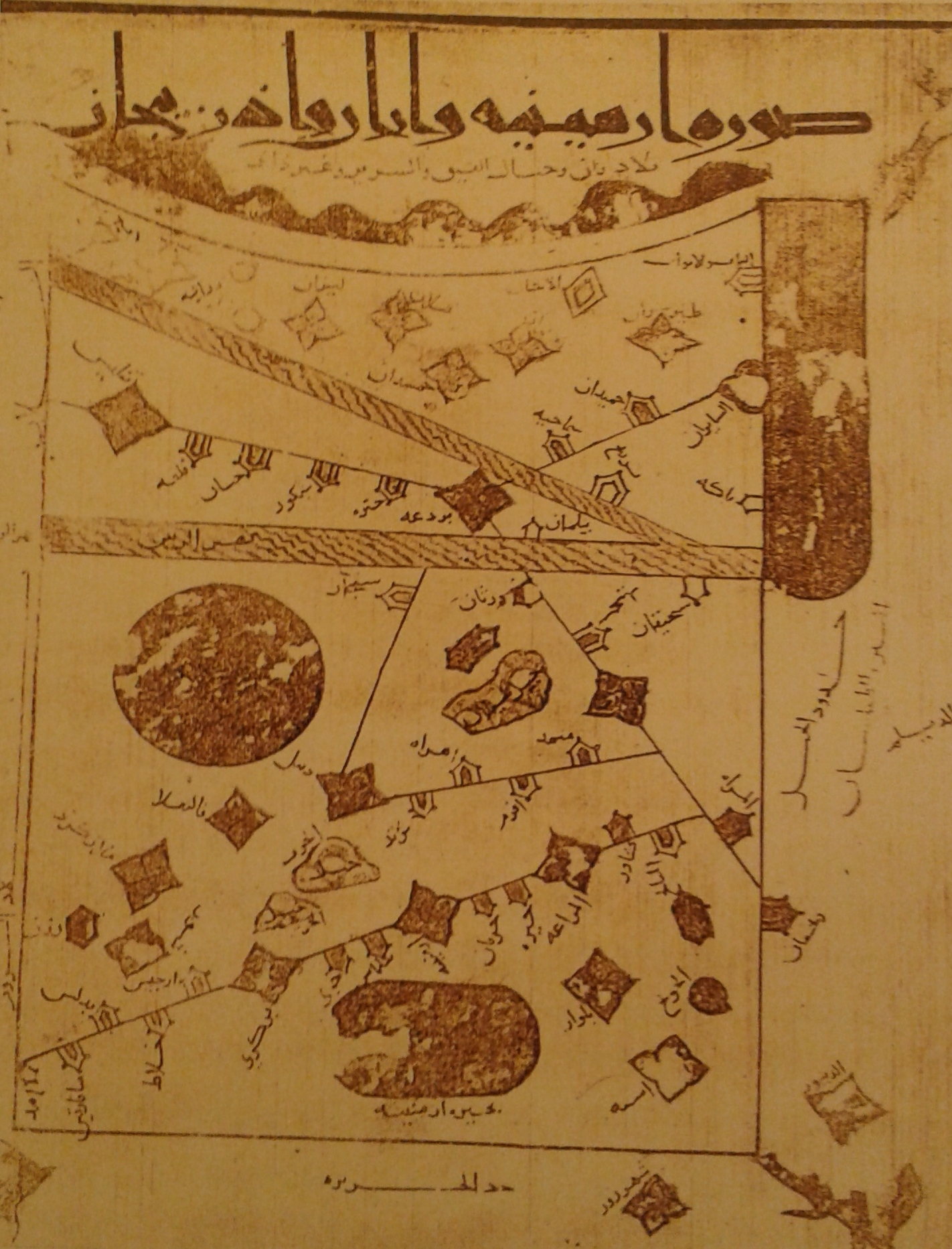
Arabic map indicating Tbilisi, 10th century

In the first decades of the 7th century, most of present-day Georgia was under the authority of the Principate of Iberia. This state, like its predecessors, continually played the two main powers of the time, the Byzantine and Sassanid Empires, to guarantee its own survival as an independent state. Allegiances were regularly switched, but from 626, when Byzantine Emperor Heraclius attacked Tbilisi and installed as presiding prince Adarnase I of the pro-Byzantine Chosroid Dynasty, Byzantine influence was dominant. From the next decade however, the Muslim conquests of the Middle East started, upsetting that balance.

The first Arab incursions in present-day Georgia happened approximately between 642 and 645, during the Conquest of Persia. It soon turned into a full-scale invasion, and Tbilisi was taken in 645. The presiding prince Stephen II had to recognize the suzerainty of the Rashidun Caliph. The region still remained marginal in the eyes of the Caliphate, and although it was officially integrated into the newly created province of Armīniya, local rulers retained at first as much autonomy as they had enjoyed under the Byzantine and Sassanid protectorates.

The Caliphate was then still in its first decades, very unstable politically, and had not yet developed a system of administration able to keep their numerous conquests under control. The main manifestation of Arab power over a region was at the same time a religious command of Islam: the payment of a tax (for territories under direct rule), or a tribute (for vassal states), by non-believers, called the jizya. Payment of it symbolized submission to the Islamic state, but was also, for the Christians of the Caucasus, a way to avoid new invasions, or punitive expeditions by the Arabs against those who did not pay. In Iberia as in Armenia, revolts against the tribute were frequent during the second half of the 7th century, each time the local nobility and presiding princes felt internal weakness in the Caliphate. The most significant of those uprisings, which engulfed the whole Caucasus region, happened in 681–682, and was led in Georgia by presiding prince Adarnase II. Despite a two-year-long struggle, the revolt was quelled, Adarnase was killed, and the Arabs installed in his place Guaram II of the rival Guaramid Dynasty.

In their efforts to assert their rule over Iberia, the Arabs also had to contend with two other major powers in the region, the Byzantine Empire and the Khazars. The latter, a confederation of semi-nomadic Turkic peoples, ruled over the steppes north of the Greater Caucasus range. They had played a role in Caucasian history since the beginning of the 7th century, when they assisted the Byzantines against Persia. Later, they successfully halted the Muslim armies in a series of wars, but also helped them suppressing the Georgian revolt of 682. The Georgian lands suffered from the confrontation between Arabs and Khazars, as they served a strategic role as a foothold for the Arabs in those repeated confrontations, and also suffered destructive incursions by the Khazars from across the mountains. As for Byzantium, it had not given up hope of reestablishing its suzerainty over Iberia, and responded to the new Arab power by first strengthening its control over the Black Sea coastal regions, Abkhazia and Lazica, which had not yet been reached by the Arabs. Around 685, the Emperor Justinian II concluded a truce with the Caliph, in which they agreed on joint possession of Iberia and Armenia. However, the Arab victory at the Battle of Sebastopolis in 692 upset the balance, and led to a new Arab conquest of Armenia, and their reaching the Black Sea and vanquishing the Kingdom of Lazica (around 697). A new status quo, more favourable to the Arabs, was now in place.

== The Emirate of Tbilisi (736–853) ==
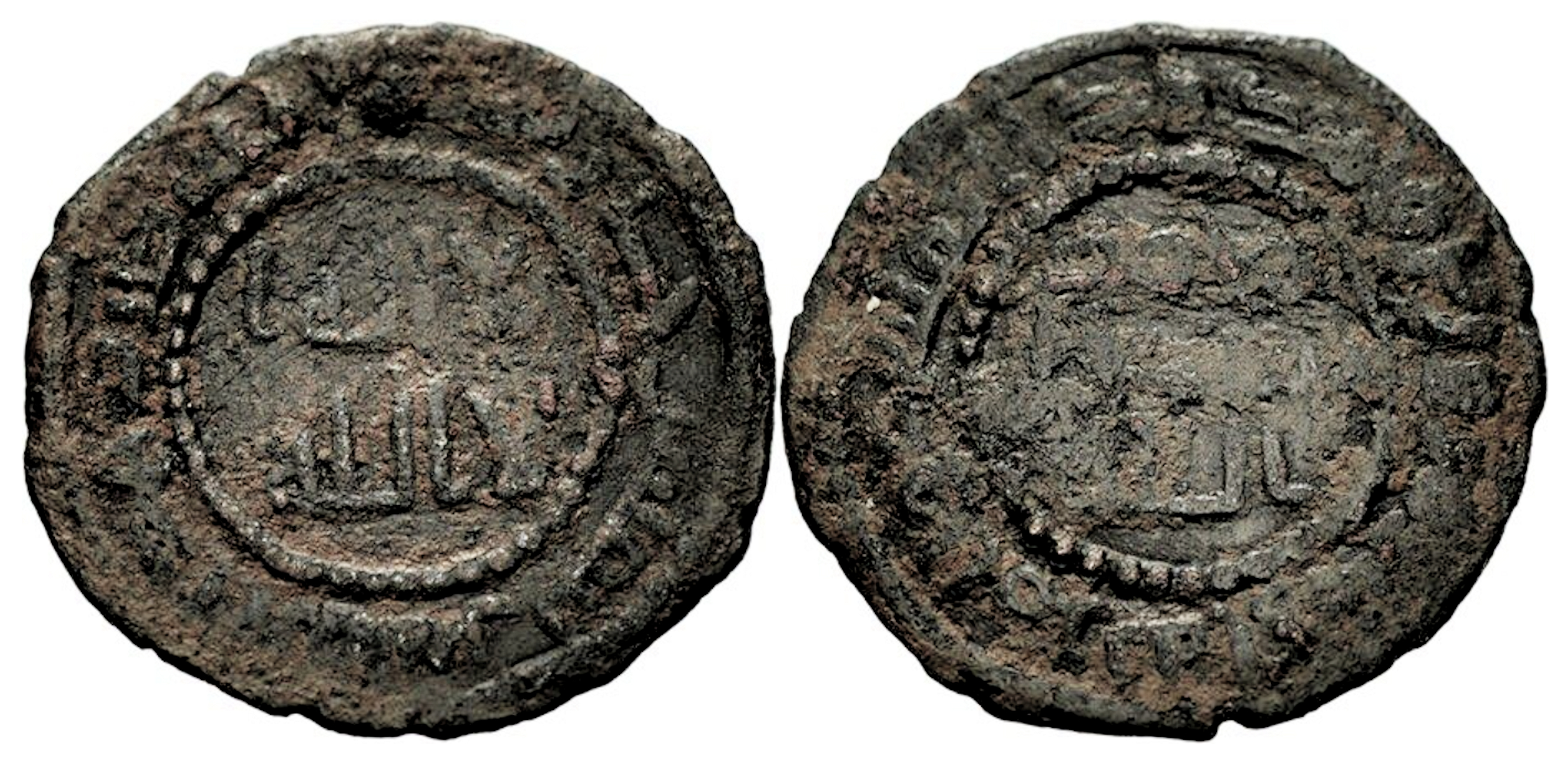
Umayyad Caliphate, Bronze coinage in the name of the caliph Marwan b. Muhammad (Marwan II, ruled 744–750 CE). Tbilisi mint

Around 730, two factors led to a change in Umayyad policy towards Georgia. First, in that year, the Khazars managed to invade Northwestern Iran and went all the way to Mosul before being defeated. The tributary buffer states of the Caucasus had not been able to prevent that invasion. Furthermore, local Christian rulers, such as Guaram III of Iberia still kept contact with Byzantium and hoped for its intervention. The Empire however was weak and Arab raids could reach Constantinople, making the Byzantines less of a menace than the Khazars. In 732–733, caliph Hisham ibn Abd al-Malik appointed Marwan ibn Muhammad governor of Armenia and Azerbaijan, with the task of waging war against the Khazars and subduing Georgia.

Georgia and the Caucasus after the establishment of the Emirate.

The campaign that followed was devastating for Georgia. Marwan did not only invade Kartli as his predecessors had done, but he also led his armies after the retreating Georgian princes into the western half of the country, from Samtskhe to Abkhazia, where they were eventually stopped. According to Cyril Toumanoff, Western Georgia, as a dependency of the Byzantine Empire, was actually the primary goal of the campaign, and the Prince of Iberia would have sided with the Arab forces to help repel the Khazars, who had just devastated his lands. Anyway, retreating from Western Georgia, Marwan established an emir in Tbilisi to rule over Iberia while he turned his armies against the Khazars (737). This invasion, and its horrors, left a strong mark in the Georgian collective memory, who nicknamed the Arab general Marwan the Deaf.

However, the new emirate had to contend with the remaining Georgian nobility and the principate, which had not been fully abolished. Furthermore, Marwan became the last Umayyad caliph and after his death, civil war engulfed the Muslim state. This allowed once again the Christian Caucasians to turn to Byzantium for help and restore large autonomy. But those hopes were soon quashed after the Abbasids restored the caliphate in Baghdad in 762: the new Muslim state was better organized and more able to claim tribute and impose its authority over border regions. This was demonstrated to Georgia in 786, when the wali of the Caucasus, Khuzayma ibn Khazim, bloodily suppressed rebellious sentiments among Georgian aristocracy.

From that moment, the local balance of power between the Arabs and the Georgian nobility became more favourable to the former. Both the ancient princely dynasties of the Guaramids and Chosroids became extinct, giving the emirs of Tbilisi more power over the land. The rural economy had been ruined by the repeated invasions, and many regions were denuded of their population, who had been killed or had fled towards the Byzantine lands. The cities, however, notably Tbilisi, prospered, as the Abbasids encouraged trade between their provinces and the use of currency (the dirham) for tribute, introducing a more open economy.

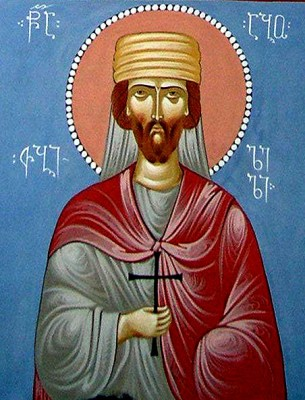
Saint Abo of Tiflis.

Some regions, removed from the main cities and trade routes, maintained a large degree of autonomy from the Arab rulers, notably in the west of Georgia. There, in Klarjeti and Samtskhe, a noble family came to prominence during the second half of the 8th century: the Bagrationi, or Georgian Bagratids. Their origin is disputed, but it is now generally admitted that they were a branch of the Armenian Bagratuni dynasty, whose ancestor Vasak migrated to Klarjeti and was given lands there after 772, before receiving most of the former Guaramid lands after the extinction of the latter line around 786. The Bagrationi established their power in Tao-Klarjeti, but soon became rivals of the emirate for the control over Georgian lands. To assert their authority, they could rely both on Byzantine intervention and on the dissensions among the Arabs. In 809, the emir of Tbilisi, Isma'il ibn Shuab, proclaimed independence from the caliphate, which sought the help of Georgian princes against the rebellion, and enrolled the Bagrationi against Ibn Shuab. In 813, the head of the dynasty, Ashot I restored the Principate of Iberia, or Kartli, for himself. He received recognition from both the caliph and the Byzantines, who bestowed upon him the official title of curopalates. This new balance between emirate and independent Bagrationi lands would continue during the next decades, the caliph supporting whichever side was less menacing to its overall authority at the moment. This allowed other Georgian regions more autonomy, and Kakheti gained its independence from both Iberia and the emirate at the time, under its own mtavari. At the same time, Byzantium lost its last dependencies on the Georgian Black Sea coast, as the Kingdom of Abkhazia expanded.

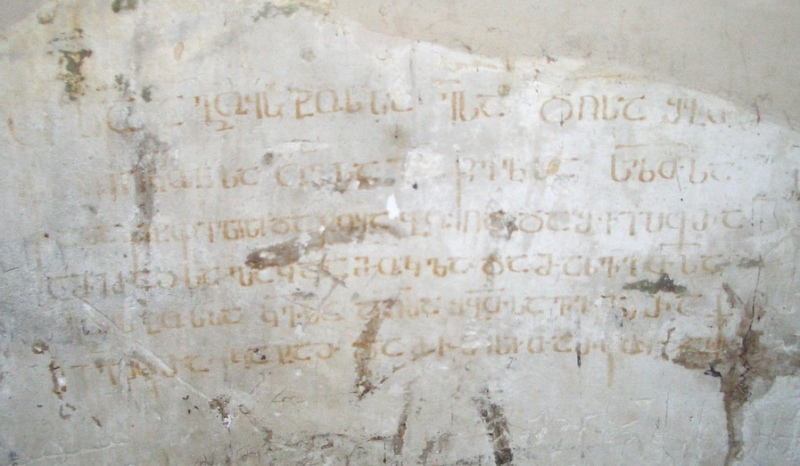
A contemporary Georgian inscription at Ateni Sioni Church mentioning the sack of Tbilisi and the downfall of its emir.

From 833, under Ishaq ibn Isma'il, the emirate regained power over Georgian lands, imposing its authority over many princes and forcing the Bagrationi to pay tribute: after Ashot's death, his domain had been shared among his three sons and was more vulnerable. Emboldened by those successes, the emir stopped recognizing the higher authority of the caliphate. Only when the Armenians also rebelled did Caliph Al-Mutawakkil react, in 853, sending the Turkish general Bugha al-Kabir with an army against the Caucasian rebels. This expedition was, in the words of Cyril Toumanoff, "marked with particular ferocity". The Abbasid army sacked and burned Tbilisi, and executed the emir. Many Georgian nobles were captured during the invasion, such as Kostanti-Kakhay, and either killed for refusing to embrace Islam, or sent as prisoners to the Abbasid capital at Samarra. The decision the Abbasids took of not rebuilding the city extensively would considerably weaken their economic and cultural influence in Georgia, and allowed the Bagrationi to become the major power in the country, facilitating its further unification.

== The progressive waning of Arab rule over Georgia (853–1120) ==
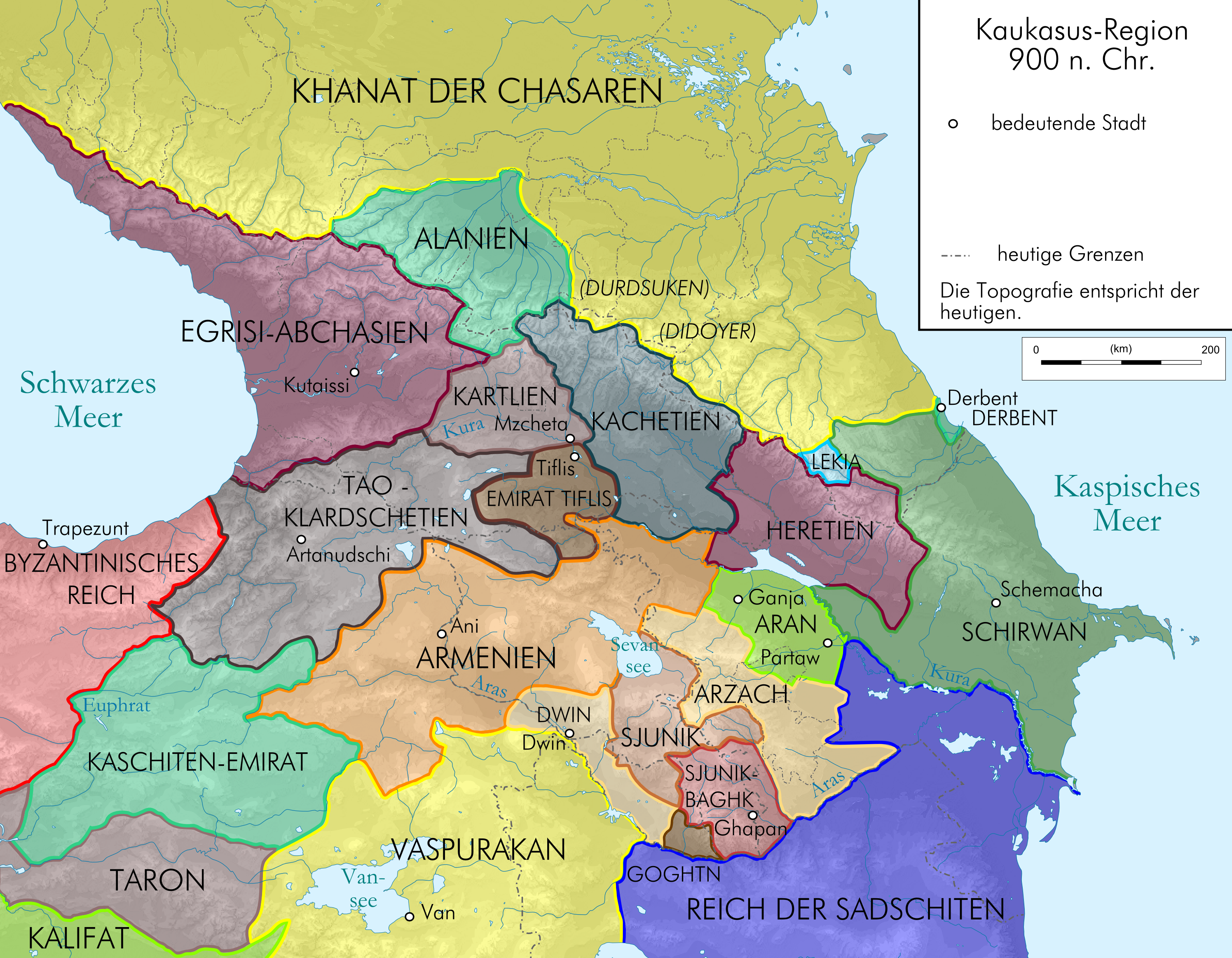
Georgia and the Caucasus around 900

After the 853 expedition, the Arab rule over Georgia was never again as strong. The emirate of Tbilisi had not been abolished, but the Caliphs would not allow its power to grow again, as it had more than once led to its rebellion against central power. Furthermore, the Byzantine Empire, under Basil I the Macedonian (r. 867–886), was experiencing a political and cultural renaissance, which could only seduce Caucasians away from the Caliph's authority.

Christian feudal states expanded during the second half of the 9th century, and the Bagratids of Armenia and Georgia especially saw their power rise. Both the Caliphate and Byzantium were now courting them to ensure their support, or at least neutrality, in their struggle against the other. Monarchy was restored in Armenia in 886 in favour of the Bagratid Ashot I, who crowned his Georgian cousin Adarnase IV king of Iberia, restoring the title. Strong Christian states now separated the weakened emirate of Tbilisi from its overlords, who exerted only the most theoretical suzerainty over the two restored kingdoms.

Another vassal of the Caliphate, Yusuf Ibn Abi'l-Saj, emir of Azerbaijan, led in 914 the last Arab attempt to restore their domination over the Caucasus. The Sajid invasion of Georgia, as it is known, was however a failure, although it devastated Georgian lands, and allowed the Bagratids to restore the alliance with Byzantium, which they had earlier neglected in favour of the Caliphs. This renewed alliance with a strong Christian power kept Georgia free from Arab interference, and allowed an economic and artistic renaissance.

From that moment, the Arabs stopped playing a significant role in the history of Georgia, and the progressive unification of the country under the Bagrationi proceeded without any interference on their part. Only Tbilisi and its surroundings was still ruled by an emir, whose relations with the Caliphate were now tenuous at best. During the 11th century, the wealthy citizens of the city gained much power, as a council of elders (birebi), and kept the emirate alive mostly as a way to avoid taxation from the Georgian kings. The Georgian king Bagrat IV took the city three times (1046, 1049, 1062), but could not keep it under his rule. By the 1060s, the Great Seljuk Empire, led by Alp Arslan, a Turk, had replaced the Arabs as the main Muslim menace facing Georgia. The Seljuks appointed a new emir in Tbilisi, but after his death in 1080, the city was again ruled by its local elders. In 1121, David IV "the Builder", King of Georgia, defeated the Seljuqs at the battle of Didgori, allowing him to enter Tbilisi the next year, and putting an end to almost 500 years of Arab presence in Georgia. Tbilisi lost its autonomy and became the royal capital, but its inhabitants long remained predominantly Muslim.
