= Konstantine Gabashvili =

Georgian politician and diplomat

Konstantine "Kote" Gabashvili (Georgian: კონსტანტინე [კოტე] გაბაშვილი) (born September 26, 1948) is a Georgian politician and diplomat. An Orientalist by training, he has been in government service since 1989. He was a member of the Parliament of Georgia in 1992 and again from 2004 to 2008. He has also served as Minister of Education (1992—1993), Mayor of Tbilisi (1993), Ambassador to Germany (1993—2004) and, simultaneously, to Poland (2001—2004). Since August 2008, he has been Ambassador Extraordinary and Plenipotentiary of Georgia to the Italian Republic, Republic of Malta and San Marino.

== Biography ==
Konstantine Gabashvili was born on September 26, 1948, in Tbilisi, the capital of then-Soviet Georgia. He graduated Tbilisi State University with a degree in the Oriental studies in 1971. He tutored at his alma mater for several years until 1993. From 1989 to 1991 he worked for the Soviet government of Georgia as a Deputy Minister of Education. After the military coup, which overthrew President of Georgia Zviad Gamsakhurdia in January 1992, Gabashvili joined the State Council of Georgia, an interim body, which relegated its rights to the newly elected parliament in October 1992. Gabashvili held a seat in this new legislature for only two months as he was moved to the post of Ministry of Education in December 1992. Georgia's Head of State Eduard Shevardnadze made him Mayor of Tbilisi from February to October 1993.

With the appointment as an ambassador to Germany later in 1993, Gabashvili's decade-long diplomatic career in Berlin began. In 2001, he simultaneously assumed the position of ambassador to Poland. After the November 2003 Rose Revolution, which toppled Eduard Shevardnadze and brought the young reformer Mikheil Saakashvili to power, Gabashvili resumed his political career in Georgia. Closely allied with Saakashvili, he was elected to the Parliament of Georgia on a United National Movement ticket in 2004. For four years of his tenure, Gabashvili chaired the parliamentary Committee for Foreign Relations. In August 2008, he was appointed as Ambassador Extraordinary and Plenipotentiary of Georgia to Italy, Malta, and San Marino.
