= 1984 Tbilisi gas explosion =

Gas explosion in Tbilisi, Georgia

Coordinates: 41.709981°N 44.792998°E

The 1984 Tbilisi gas explosion was a natural gas explosion in a nine-story apartment block in Tbilisi, Georgia on 2 December 1984 that killed at least 100 people. Utility workers were investigating complaints of a gas leak when the explosion occurred. A broadcast on Georgian television said that 35 families had been affected by the explosion.
