= Zarya Vostoka building =

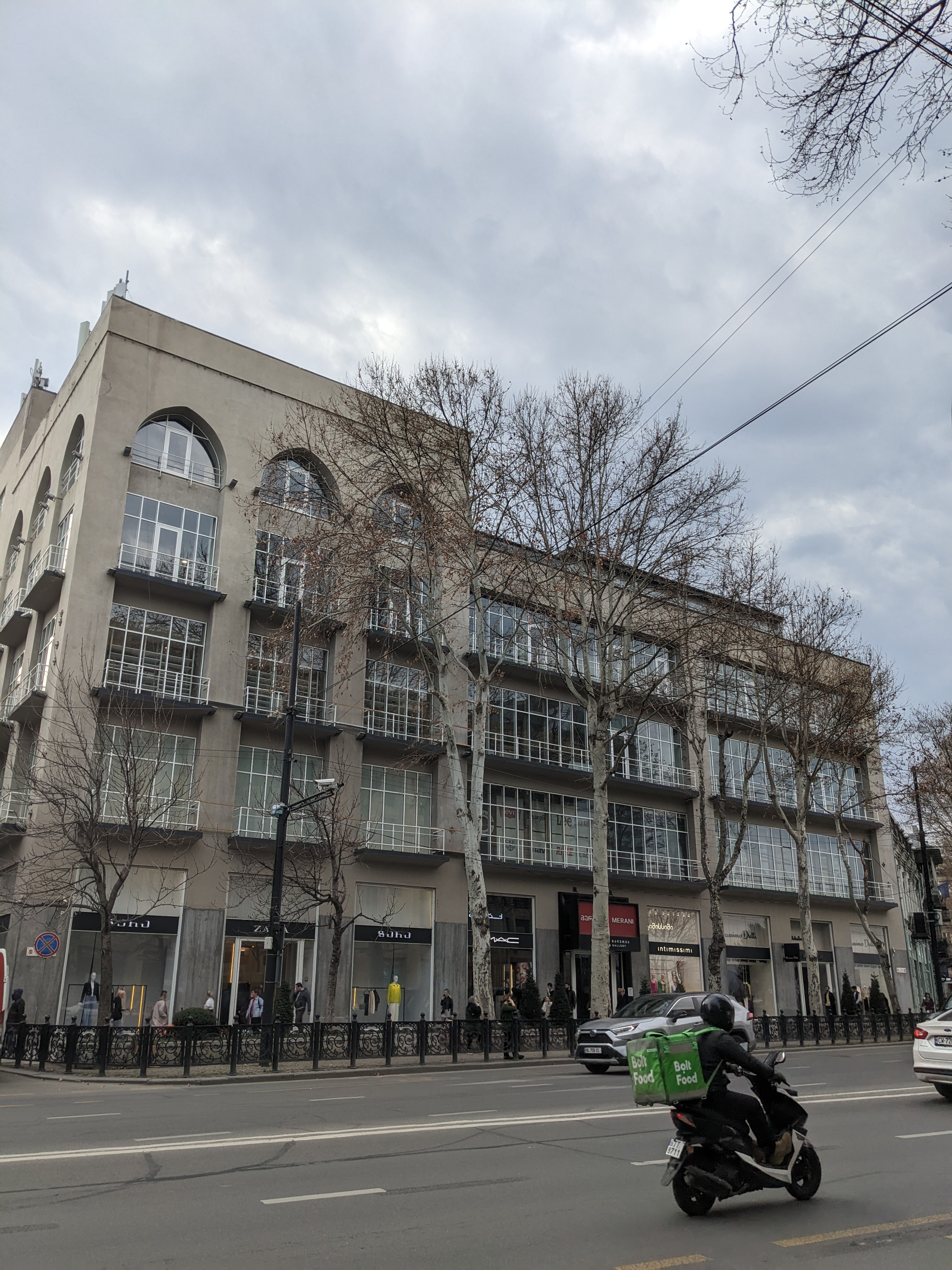
- Interactive map of the Zarya Vostoka building area

General information
- Architectural style: Constructivist architecture
- Location: 42 Rustaveli Avenue, Tbilisi, Georgia
- Coordinates: 41.70231°N 44.79329°E
- Completed: 1930

Design and construction
- Architect: David Chisliev

The Zarya Vostoka building is an office building in Tbilisi on Rustaveli Avenue. It was built in 1931 by the Armenian architect David Chisliev as the headquarters for the Russian-language newspaper Zarya Vostoka in the constructivist style. At the same location was until 1913 a wooden circus building owned by the Nikitin brothers. The building later housed the publishing house Merani and was until 2007 a protected monument of national importance. Currently renovations are under progress that according to some critics threaten the historical substance of the building.
