= Shota Kavlashvili =

- შოთა ყავლაშვილი
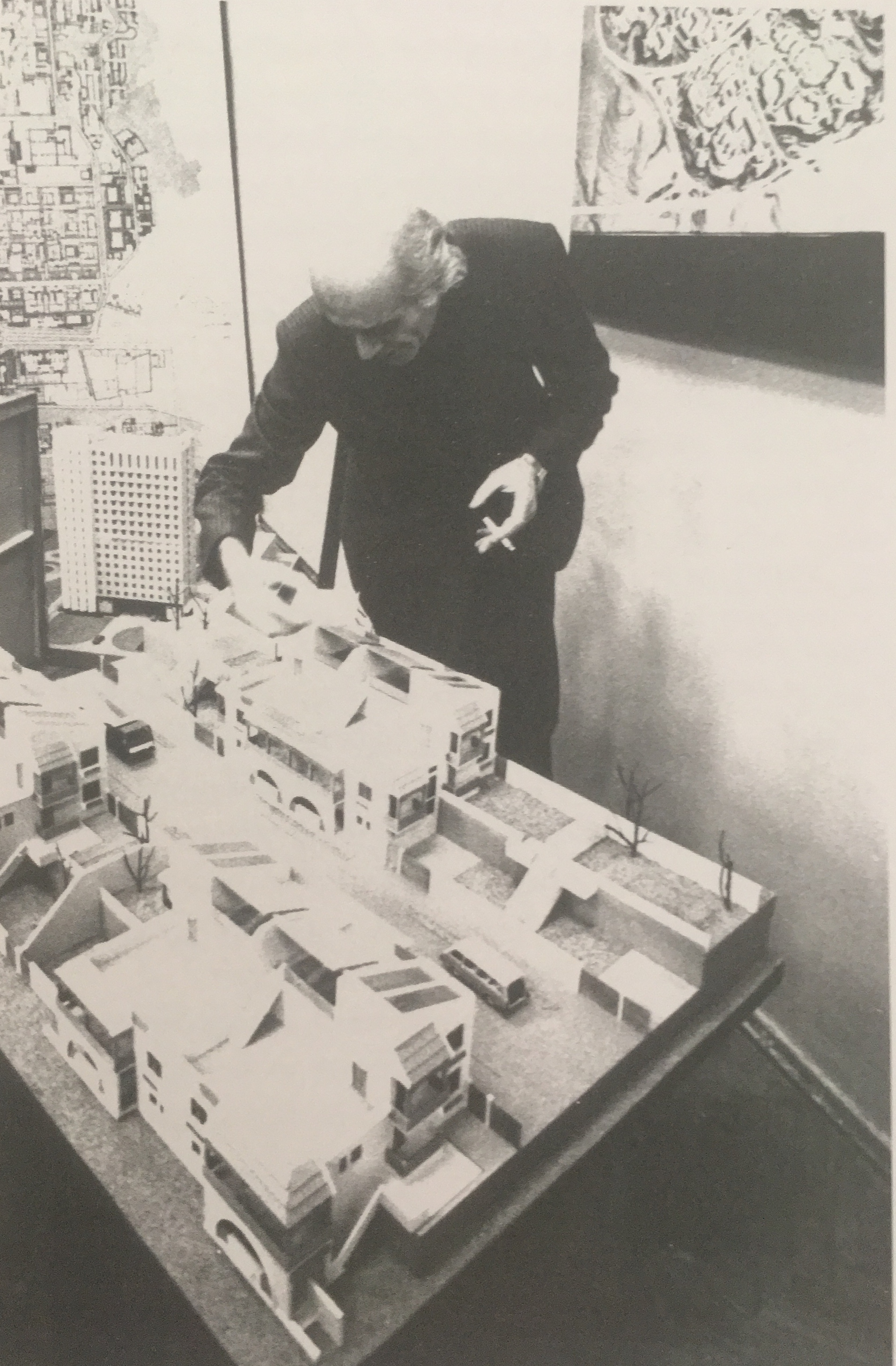
- Born: 28 January 1926; Tbilisi, Georgian Soviet Socialist Republic
- Died: 11 December 1995 (aged 69); Tbilisi, Georgia
- Resting place: Didube Pantheon

Shota Kavlashvili (Georgian: შოთა ყავლაშვილი; 28 January 1926 – December 1995) was a Georgian architect and historic preservationist, best known for his work in Tbilisi during the postwar Soviet period.

== Career ==
Kavlashvili was among the most prolific Georgian architects of the Soviet period. His works include some of the most inventive civic architecture in the capital city of Tbilisi, including the Laguna Vera swimming complex and the Central Bus Station. Kavlashvili also served as Chief Architect of Tbilisi (1970-1974; 1980-1990), overseeing the preservation of Old Tbilisi and the creation of the country's first urban historic district in 1975. In 1994, he was appointed Vice-Mayor and Chief Architect of Poti. In recognition of his efforts, the city renamed a street in Old Tbilisi after Kavlashvili, and his statue (by sculptor Tengiz Kikalishvili) was added outside the old city gates on Baratashvili Street in 1999. He is buried at the Didube Pantheon of Writers and Public Figures in Tbilisi.

== Major works ==
- Griboyedov Square apartments and wedding house (1958)
- Baratashvili Bridge (1964)
- Laguna Vera (1965-1978)
- Ramishvili Street apartments (1970-1974)
- Central Bus Station (1973)
- Gruz-Film Studio City (1976)
- Ministry of Internal Affairs Headquarters (late 1970s)
- District Soviet of Peoples Deputies (1977)
- Baratashvili Wall restoration project (1979)
- Tbilisi Museum of Archaeology (1988-unfinished)
- Sheraton Metekhi Palace Hotel (1989-1991)
