= Iberia TV =

Definct TV channel in Georgia (country)

Iberia (Georgian: ტელეკომპანია „იბერიამ“) was a television channel in Georgia. It was founded in 1996 and initially owned by private persons, as well as Georgian Post Bank 20%, Egtel Ltd. 20%, Technoleasing Ltd. 10%. After several changes of the ownership, the prosecutor's office launched investigations in the wrongdoings, and it was divided into two legal successors: TV Company Aisi Ltd and Iberia TV Ltd. The actions of the riot police sealed the TV channel equipment and the broadcasting was stopped. Eventually the Aisi license was returned to Iberia TV. Broadcasting was relaunched in 2015.

In 2018 the channel was suspended, allegedly under the pressure from the authorities.
