= Tbilisi Fashion Week =

Georgian fashion industry event

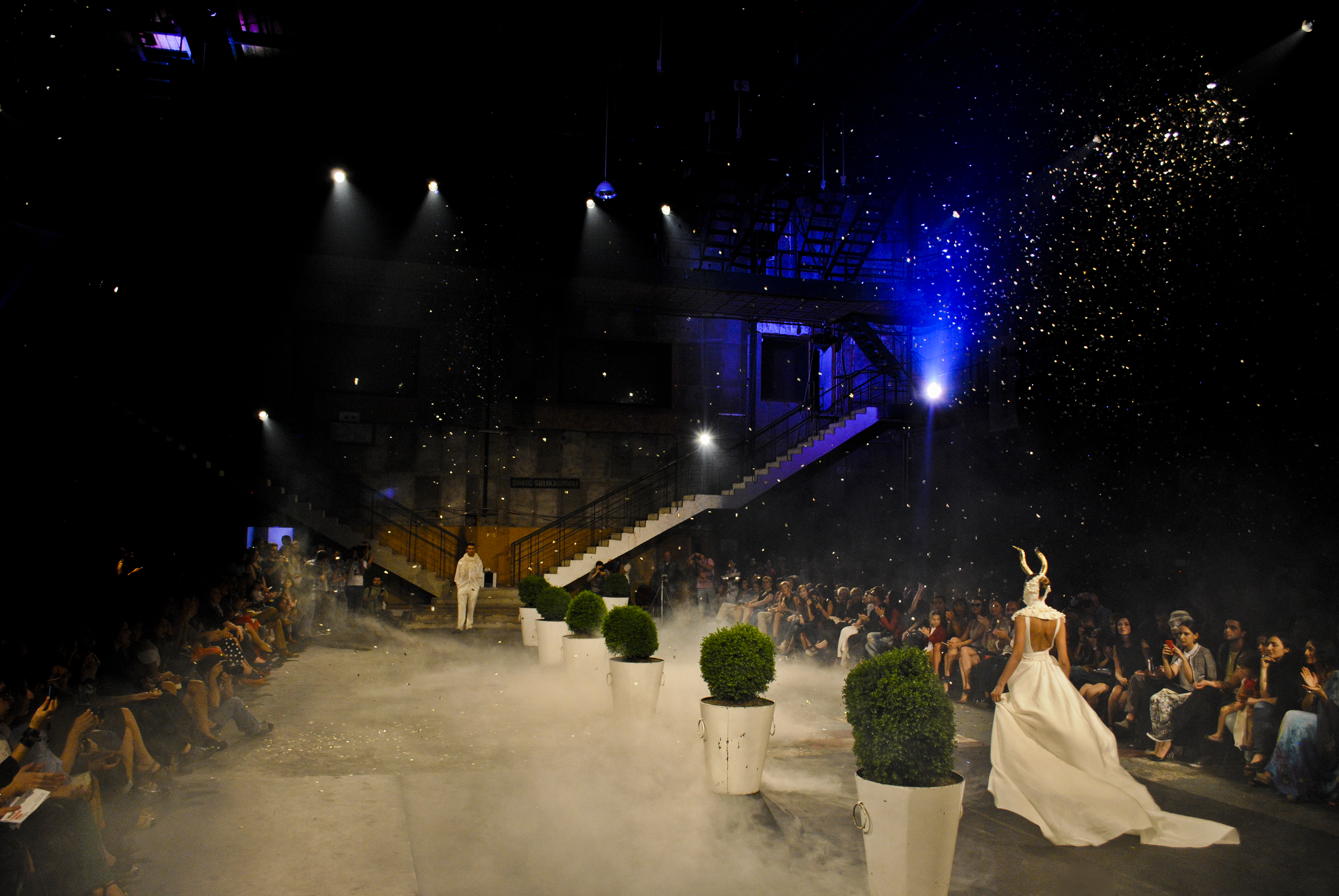
- Model walks the runway at Tbilisi Fashion Week 2012
- Genre: fashion catwalk shows, clothing and fashion exhibitions, and surrounding events
- Frequency: biannually
- Locations: Tbilisi, Georgia
- Inaugurated: 2009
- Founder: Tako Chkheidze
- Website: tbilisifashionweek.com

Tbilisi Fashion Week, or TFW (Georgian: თბილისის მოდის კვირეული, romanized: tbilisis modis k'vireuli) is a Georgian fashion week in its capital city of Tbilisi. TFW hosts industry professionals twice a year, in Spring and Fall. TFW was established in 2009 during Tbilisoba festival.

TFW is a fashion hub in the Caucasus which maintains the fashion industry development and introduces new faces and exports Georgian fashion production.

Georgia's fashion industry, TFW and Mercedes-Benz Fashion Week Tbilisi have garnered international attention following the success of home-grown talent designers like David Koma, and more importantly Demna Gvasalia of luxury brand Balenciaga and his own brand Vetements. Tbilisi is now dubbed as one of the "fashion capitals of Eastern Europe".

== Locations ==
TFW keeps experimenting with hosting fashion venues on different locations all over the city, from museums or art galleries, nightclubs like Bassiani to Old Tbilisi streets.

== See also ==
- Culture of Georgia (country)
- Vetements
