= Zurab Tchiaberashvili =

Georgian politician and diplomat

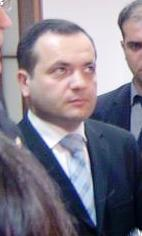
Zurab Tchiaberashvili

Zurab Tchiaberashvili (Georgian: ზურაბ ჭიაბერაშვილი, also spelled Chiaberashvili) (born 6 June 1972) is a Georgian politician and diplomat. He currently is a leading figure in the opposition European Georgia, after most recently serving as a governor of the Kakheti region.

Having a background in academia and the nongovernmental sector, Tchiaberashvili joined the ranks of the government after Georgia's 2003 Rose Revolution, serving as the chairman of the Central Election Commission of Georgia from 2003 to 2004 and then as the mayor of Tbilisi from 2004 to 2005. Tchiaberashvili was Georgia's permanent representative to the Council of Europe from 2005 to 2010 and ambassador to the Swiss Confederation and Principality of Liechtenstein, and Permanent Representative to the United Nations office and other international organizations in Geneva from 2010 to 2012. He served as Georgia's Minister of Health, Labour and Social Affairs from 20 March 2012 to 25 October 2012.

== Education ==
A Tbilisi native, Zurab Tchiaberashvili studied at the Faculty of Philosophy and Sociology, Tbilisi State University (1989–1994, BA degree) and the Institute of Philosophy, Georgian National Academy of Sciences (1994–1997, MA degree), and obtained Ph.D. in Philosophy from the Tbilisi State University (1999). As an Open Society Institute's Faculty Development Fellow, he spent two Spring Semesters (2002 and 2003) at the Transregional Center for Democratic Studies, Graduate Faculty of Political and Social Science, New School University, New York, USA. In 2009 he graduated from the Executive MBA Joint program with Kellogg School of Management, Northwestern University, Evanston, USA, and WHU – Otto Beisheim School of Management, Vallendar, Germany.

== Early career ==
Zurab Tchiaberashvili's career started as a reporter and then a news editor for the Georgian daily Resonance in the 1990s. At that time, he also taught at the Faculty of Philosophy and Sociology, Tbilisi State University. In 1997 he began active in civic society, joining the election watchdog International Society for Fair Elections and Democracy (ISFED) of which he became the Executive Director in 2002.

Tchiaberashvili was among those observers who denounced the 2 November 2003 Georgian parliamentary election as rigged. The protests that followed the election led to the resignation of the then-President of Georgia Eduard Shevardnadze in what became known as the "Rose Revolution" on 23 November 2003. After the power change, Tchiaberashvili became the chairman of the Central Election Commission of Georgia, being in charge of conducting the snap presidential and parliamentary elections in 2004.

== Government and diplomatic service ==
On 19 April 2004 Tchiaberashvili became Mayor of Tbilisi—the capital of Georgia—still an appointive office at that time, after President Mikheil Saakashvili dismissed Mayor Ivane Zodelava. He presided over the creation of a strategic plan to overcome problems with Tbilisi's urban infrastructure, including the water, sewage, electric, and public transportation systems. During his tenure, Tchiaberashvili was criticized by his former NGO colleagues for turning back from his original plans to decentralize the Tbilisi government.

On 16 September 2005 Tchiaberashvili was approved by the Parliament of Georgia as Georgia's permanent representative to the Council of Europe (CoE), a position which made him involved in diplomatic battles following the August 2008 Russian–Georgian war. On 10 December 2010 Tchiaberashvili was approved as ambassador to the Swiss Confederation and Principality of Liechtenstein, and Permanent Representative to the United Nations office and other international organizations in Geneva. In 2011, he was involved in the Swiss-mediated Russian–Georgian negotiations over Russia's ascension to World Trade Organization. On 15 March 2012 he was nominated as Georgia's Minister of Health, Labour and Social Affairs, and approved by the Parliament of Georgia on 20 March 2012. After the October 2012 parliamentary election, he was succeeded by David Sergeenko. Tchiaberashvili was instead moved by President Saakashvili to the position of governor of the eastern Georgian region of Kakheti. Subsequently, he became a leading opposition politician, with the United National Movement.

== Arrest and sentence ==
On 21 May 2013 Zurab Tchiaberashvili and Ivane Merabishvili, Georgia's former Prime Minister and the Secretary General of the United National Movement party, were arrested in connection to investigation into alleged misspending of GEL 5.2 million public funds on their party activists during the 2012 election campaign, leading to accusations of political vendetta leveled by the United National Movement against the Ivanishvili government.

On 17 February 2014 Tchiaberashvili was sentenced a fine of 52,000 lari for being negligent about his duties. The Tchiaberashvili defense team appealed the sentence.

== Personal life ==
Tchiaberashvili is married to Nino Lakvekheliani, with two children: Giorgi and Mariam.
