= Badri Shoshitaishvili =

Georgian politician (1946–2004)

Badri Shoshitaishvili (Georgian: ბადრი შოშიტაიშვილი; 28 October 1946 – 2 November 2004) was a Georgian politician and Minister of Industry for Georgia.

Shoshitaishvili served as the mayor of Tbilisi between 1995 and 1998. He was active in the politics of industry and commerce in Georgia.

Shoshitaishvili died on 2 November 2004.
