= Tbilisi City Hall =

City government

- თბილისის მერია
- Seal of Tbilisi

Agency overview
- Type: City Executive branch
- Agency executives: Kakha Kaladze, Mayor of Tbilisi; Irakli Khmaladze, Vice-Mayor
- Website: tbilisi.gov.ge

Tbilisi City Hall (Georgian: თბილისის მერია) is a body that provides executive-regulatory activities of the city of Tbilisi. The government consists of: the mayor, deputy mayors and heads of Tbilisi city services. Tbilisi district governors are officially part of the government. The heads of the control and supervision services within the Tbilisi City Hall system are not part of the Tbilisi City Government.

On February 3, 2008, the administration of the City Hall and the city services moved to a new building, in the former "Labor Palace" located at 7 Zhiuli Shartava Street. Prior to that, the mayor's administration housed the historic building on Freedom Square, while municipal services housed various buildings throughout Tbilisi.

== Structure ==
Structure of Tbilisi City Hall:

- Mayor;
- Vice Mayor;
- Deputy Mayors;
- City Hall Administration;

'City Services:'

- Municipal Finance Service;
- Municipal Service of Social Services and Culture;
- Municipal Economic Policy Service;
- Municipal Transport Service;
- Municipal Internal Audit and Monitoring Service;
- Municipal Procurement Service;
- Municipal Supervision Service;
- Municipal Improvement Service;
- Municipal Service of Ecology and Landscaping;
- Municipal Legal Service;
- City Security Service.

'Other Services:'

- LEPL - Tbilisi Architecture Service
- LEPL Property Management Agency
- LEPL Emergency Management Agency

== See also ==
- Government of Tbilisi
- Tbilisi City Assembly
