= Georgian Parliament Building =

The Georgian Parliament Building may mean:

- Georgian Parliament Building (Tbilisi), location of the parliament before May 2012 and since January 2019
- Georgian Parliament Building (Kutaisi), location of the parliament between May 2012 and January 2019
