= Agreement between Armenia and Azerbaijan respecting the District of Zanghezour =

1919 peace agreement

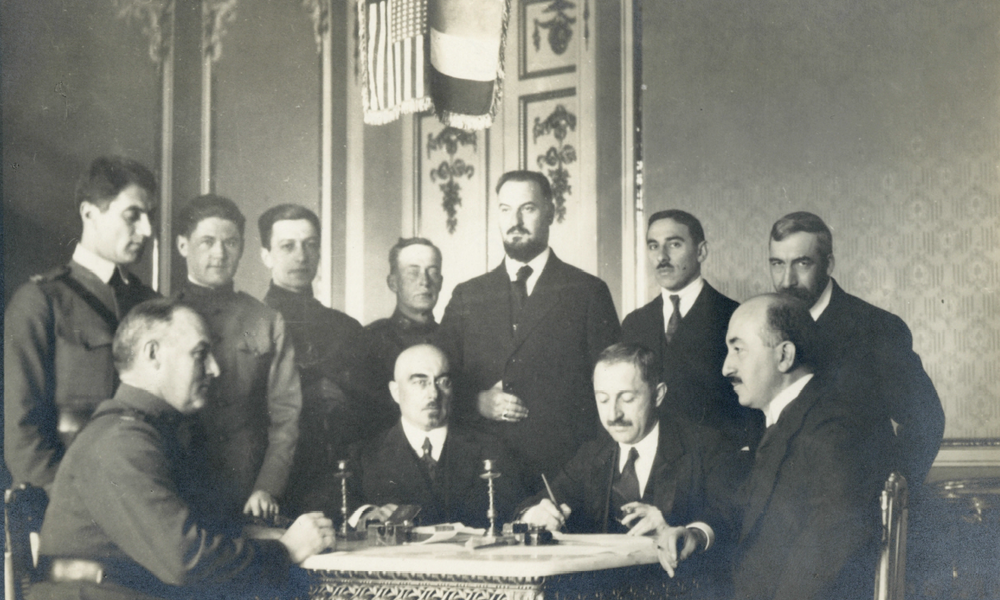
- Signing of the agreement between Azerbaijan and Armenia in Tiflis on 23 November 1919
- Signed: 23 November 1919
- Location: Palace of Georgian Government, Tiflis, (Note: Present-day Tbilisi.) Georgia
- Mediators: (Georgia (country)) Evgeni Gegechkori; (United Kingdom) Sir Oliver Wardrop; (United States) James C. Ray (Acting allied High Commissioner)
- Signatories: (Armenia) Alexander Khatisian; (Azerbaijan) Nasib bey Yusifbeyli

Full text
- Mutual Agreement between Armenia and Azerbaijan (1919) at Wikisource

The Agreement between Armenia and Azerbaijan respecting the District of Zanghezour was a peace agreement between the short-lived Armenian and Azerbaijani republics signed on 23 November 1919 in Tiflis (present-day Tbilisi) and brokered by Georgia. The peace treaty came as a result of an unsuccessful Azerbaijani military campaign to absorb the Armenian-controlled Zangezur region, with the aim of forming a link with the Azerbaijani-controlled Nakhichevan. Despite the peace agreement, Azerbaijan in March 1920 again moved its forces westward to attempt to capture Zangezur, however, was stopped due to an Armenian rebellion in Nagorno–Karabakh and the country's sovietisation in April.

== Background ==
In 1918, following the collapse of Russian authority in the South Caucasus (due to the events of the Russian Revolution) and after the withdrawal of the Ottoman Empire (which occupied parts of the Russian Caucasus), the newly established Armenian and Azerbaijani republics engaged in a two-year war over their territorial ambitions. The disputed regions were principally Nakhchivan, Zangezur, and Nagorno-Karabakh. During the Ottoman army's invasion of the South Caucasus in 1918, Nakhchivan was occupied and its Armenian population expelled or massacred in an extension of the Armenian genocide. Following the Ottoman withdrawal from the region, the local Muslim-dominated Republic of Aras was established and existed until its capitulation to Armenian–British forces in May 1919; Nakhchivan was then incorporated into Armenia, which briefly allowed for the repatriation of expelled Armenians. After two months of Armenian governance, the region fell again to local control during the Muslim uprisings against Armenian rule in July 1919, not being regained by Armenia until July 1920. During the 1919 uprising in Nakhchivan, a further 10,000 Armenians were massacred and 45 of their villages were razed by local Muslims. (Note: See particularly the Agulis massacre.) Following the conclusion of the Turkish–Armenian War, Nakhchivan became a protectorate of Soviet Azerbaijan, namely, the Nakhichevan Autonomous Soviet Socialist Republic.

Zangezur was under the control of a local Armenian council in 1918 which successfully resisted Azerbaijani–Ottoman, and later Azerbaijani–British incursions until its incorporation into Armenia in 1919. In late 1919, Azerbaijan launched an attack on Zangezur, but failed to capture the region.

Nagorno-Karabakh, similarly to Zangezur, was self-governed by its Armenian population since the collapse of Russian authority, however, its key city of Shusha was occupied by Azerbaijani–Ottoman forces in late 1918. After the Ottoman withdrawal from the South Caucasus, the British under the command of General Thomson supplanted their forces in the region and in temporarily assigning Nagorno-Karabakh to Azerbaijan helped subjugate the local Armenian council to assent to Azerbaijani authority pending the result of the Paris Peace Conference.

== Situation in Zangezur ==
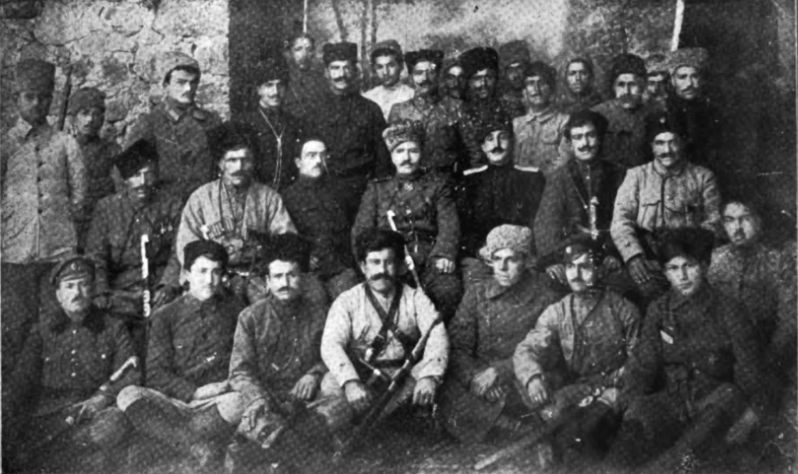
Andranik and his partisans

From 1918, Armenian partisan commanders Andranik Ozanian and Garegin Nzhdeh brought about a "re-Armenianization" of Zangezur through the expulsion of tens of thousands of Azerbaijanis, and destruction of tens of villages. These factors, coupled with the restrictions imposed by local Armenians on Muslim shepherds taking their flocks into Zangezur, served as the casus belli for Azerbaijan's campaign against Zangezur in late 1919.

Following the British withdrawal from the South Caucasus, the Azerbaijani Army and Kurdish militias led by the brother of the Governor-General of Karabakh, Sultan bey Sultanov launched a campaign to capture Zangezur on the dawn of 4 November 1919, confident in their success after subjugating the Armenians of Nagorno-Karabakh and the Mughan Soviet Republic. Despite meeting success on all fronts and routing local forces, the Azerbaijanis suffered heavy casualties and retreated on 9 November.

== Terms of the agreement ==
After four days of negotiations held in the Palace of Georgian Government in Tiflis, on 23 November 1919, prime minister Alexander Khatisian of Armenia and prime minister Nasib bey Yusifbeyli of Azerbaijan under combined British and American diplomatic pressure signed a peace treaty under the auspices of foreign minister Evgeni Gegechkori of Georgia and Colonel James Rhea of the United States. UCLA historian Richard G. Hovannisian describes the agreement as "basically a declaration of intent". (Note: The agreement served more as a statement of shared goals and mutual assurances of Armenia and Azerbaijan than a binding contract with detailed terms and immediate legal enforceability, leading to the agreement collapsing in 1920.) The terms the two states agreed to were as follow:

1. That the government of Armenia and Azerbaijan pledge themselves to stop the present hostilities and not resort to force of arms.
2. That the Governments of Armenia and Azerbaijan agree to take effective measures for repairing and re-opening, for peaceful traffic, the roads leading into Zangezur.
3. That the Governments of Armenia and Azerbaijan pledge themselves to settle all controversies, including boundaries, by means of peaceful agreements pending the decisions of the conference convened in the following paragraph. In case this is not possible, then to select a neutral party as arbiter, whose decisions, both governments agree to abide by, said neutral party for the present being col. James C. Rhea, U.S. Army.
4. That the Governments of Armenia and Azerbaijan pledge themselves to immediately appoint an equal number of delegates to meet in conference in Baku on Wednesday, 26 November, and to sojourn to Tiflis on 4 December, where the meetings of the conference will discuss all questions which are the cause of dispute or friction between the two Governments and will have full authority to settle all such questions by agreement or arbitration.
5. That this agreement becomes effective on the date of signing and becomes permanent when ratified by the parliaments of the two governments, and the prime ministers of Armenia and Azerbaijan hereby bind their respective governments to faithfully support and carry out all the details of the above agreement, in evidence of which they place their respective signatures to this agreement, ...

== Aftermath ==
After signing the agreement, Azerbaijan withdrew its forces from Zangezur – despite the deescalation, Azerbaijan alleged that the Armenian army was plundering and destroying Muslim villages in the region through the use of artillery. From 11–12 March 1920, Azerbaijan dispatched ninety railway trucks of soldiers from Baku in preparation for another attack against Zangezur; according to Armenian military officials in the region, (Note: Sergei Melik-Yolchian and Major General Hovhannes Ghazarian (Ivan Kazarov).) "there was hard evidence in hand that Azerbaijan intended to move against Zangezur on March 25".

In March 1920, days before the second attack was to occur, the Armenians of Nagorno-Karabakh rebelled against provisional Azerbaijani rule with Armenian support. The rebellion was unsuccessful and led to the destruction of the Armenian quarter of Shusha by Azerbaijani soldiers—by April, Armenian forces were in control of the countryside, though were eventually ousted from the region by the Red Army. In 1921, the region was set to become an autonomy within Soviet Azerbaijan.

In 1920, the region was invaded by units of the Red Army who sought to establish a link with the Turkish Nationalists after Sovietising Azerbaijan, however, were mostly repelled; effectively, this made the agreement moot as it eliminated Azerbaijan's independence. In early 1921, shortly after Armenia had been sovietised, an anti-Soviet revolt spread to Zangezur and remained active until July of that year when the rebels fled to neighbouring Iran after receiving assurances that the region "would become a permanent part of Soviet Armenia."

== Bibliography ==
- "Agreement between Armenia and Azerbaijan respecting the District of Zanghezour, signed at Tiflis, 22 November 1919". Oxford Public International Law. Archived from the original on 22 December 2022.
- Broers, Laurence (2019). Armenia and Azerbaijan: Anatomy of a Rivalry. Edinburgh, UK. ISBN 978-1-4744-5054-6. OCLC 1127546732.
- de Waal, Thomas (2003). Black Garden: Armenia and Azerbaijan Through Peace and War. New York: New York University Press. ISBN 978-0814719459.
- Der Matossian, Bedross (2020). The First Republic of Armenia (1918-1920): On its Centenary: Politics, Gender, and Diplomacy. Fresno: The Press at California State University. ISBN 978-0912201672. OCLC 1162163551.
- Gerwarth, Robert; Horne, John, eds. (2012). War in Peace: Paramilitary Violence in Europe after the Great War. Oxford: Oxford University Press. ISBN 9780191626531. OCLC 827777835.
- Gharibyan, Alik (2014). THE ISSUE OF NAGORNO-KARABAKH IN 1918-1920 AND GREAT BRITAIN (PDF). Yerevan: YSU Press. ISBN 978-5-8084-1880-6. Archived from the original (PDF) on 13 October 2016.
- Hille, Charlotte (2010). State Building and Conflict Resolution in the Caucasus. Leiden: Brill. ISBN 978-90-474-4136-6. OCLC 668211543.
- Hovannisian, Richard G. (1982). The Republic of Armenia. Vol. 2: From Versailles to London, 1919–1920. Berkeley: University of California Press. ISBN 978-0520041868.
- Hovannisian, Richard G. (1996a). The Republic of Armenia. Vol. 3: From London to Sèvres, February–August 1920. Berkeley: University of California Press. ISBN 978-0520088030.
- Saparov, Arsène (2014). From conflict to autonomy in the Caucasus: the Soviet Union and the making of Abkhazia, South Ossetia and Nagorno Karabakh. Routledge. ISBN 978-1-317-63783-7. OCLC 1124532887.
- Smele, Jonathan D. (2015). Historical Dictionary of the Russian Civil Wars, 1916–1926. Lanham, Maryland. ISBN 978-1-4422-5281-3. OCLC 923010906.
