= Gunib Square, Tiflis =

Coordinates: 41.6968°N 44.798°E

Ghunib Square (Georgian: ღუნიბის მოედანი, romanized: ghunibis moedani) was a square in Old Tbilisi on the site where the Georgian Parliament building now stands on Rustaveli Avenue. The square was named to commemorate the capture of Shamil's fortress - Gunib, in Dagestan by the Russian army on March 25, 1859. In connection with the construction of the Alexander Nevsky Military Temple in 1897, the square was renamed the Temple Square ("Soborn"), but it virtually ceased to exist.

== Bibliography ==
- Kvirkvelia, T., Old Tbilisi Names, p. 89. "Soviet Georgia", Tbilisi, 1985
- Dzidziguri M., Iosebidze D. On the Establishment of Nikoloz and Ghunib Squares in the XIX Century and Their Further Renovation // Caucasus Herald: (Special Edition [3]). - 2004. - p. 33-38. Res. Russian. And Engl. In languages
