= Alexander Nevsky Cathedral, Tiflis =

Former Eastern Orthodox cathedral in Tbilisi, Georgia

Coordinates: 41°41′48″N 44°47′53″E

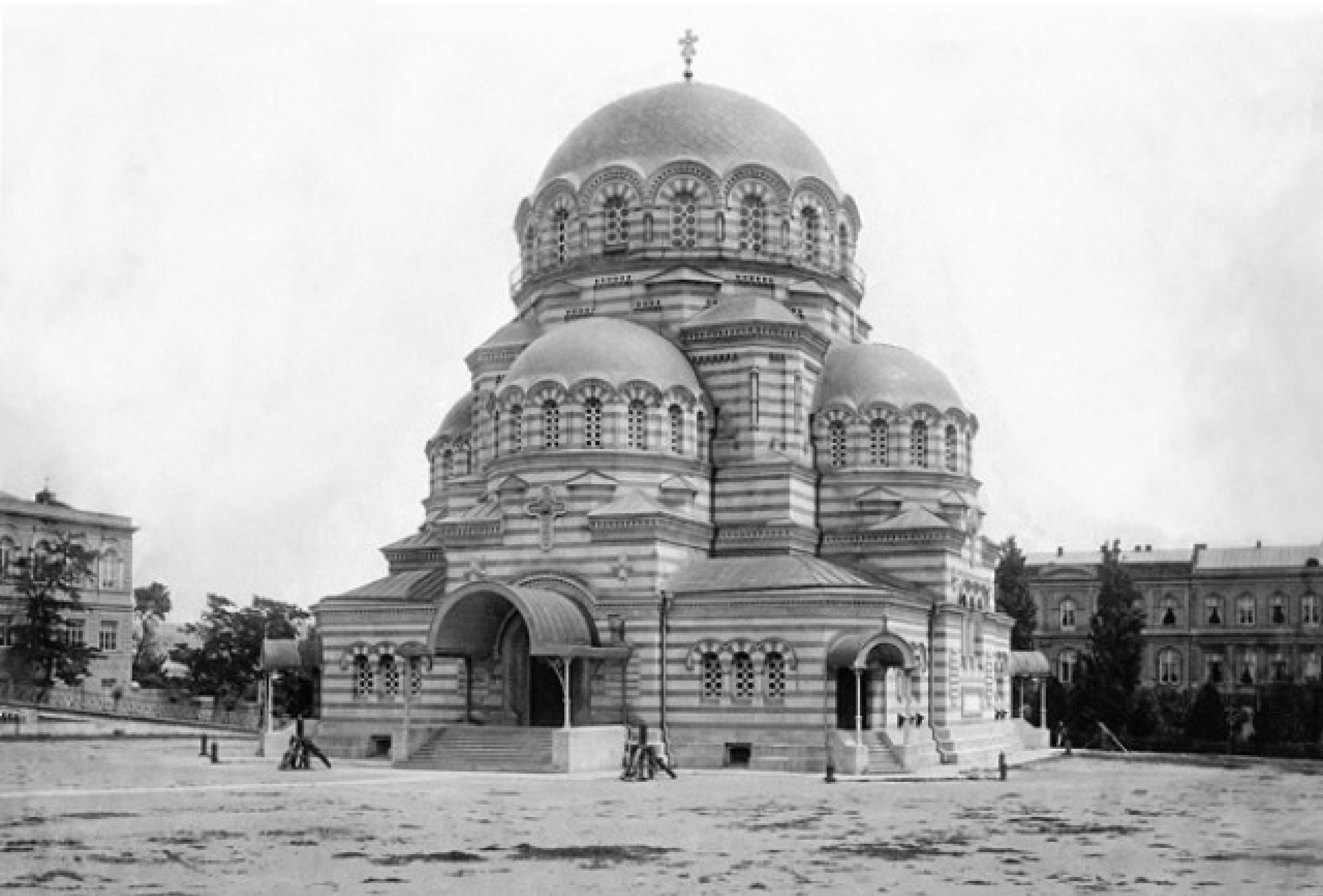
Military Cathedral of Tiflis.

The St. Alexander Nevsky Military Cathedral of Tiflis (Georgian: ტფილისის სამხედრო ტაძარი, tp'ilisis samkhedro tadzari; Russian: Тифлисский Александро-Невский военный собор, Tiflisskiy Aleksandro-Nevskiy voyenny sobor) was an Orthodox Christian cathedral in downtown Tiflis (now Tbilisi), Georgia, constructed during the Imperial Russian rule in 1871-1872 and 1889–1897 and demolished by the Soviet authorities in 1930. The novel design of the cathedral became a standard for the emerging Neo-Byzantine style well before the cathedral was completed.

== History ==
The cathedral was erected to commemorate the Russian victory in the Caucasus War against the North Caucasus mountainous peoples and was named after the medieval Russian saint Alexander Nevsky. It was initially sponsored by the high priest of the Caucasian army Sergey Gumilevsky, military governor count Sheremetev and grand duke Mikhail Nikolayevich.

An architectural contest for the cathedral was held in 1865; the government requested it to be executed in "grandiose and magnificent" style and to fit up to 2000 worshippers in the upper (summer) church. However, the funds allocated for the project, even with provision for continuing private donations, were insufficient to these purposes. Although the board awarded first prize to a joint collaboration of Victor Schroeter and Andrey Huhn, this eight-dome design was rejected due to high cost. In the end the board chose a simpler design by David Grimm. Grimm reused a cross-shaped pattern invented by Roman Kuzmin, with four symmetrical apses tightly blended into the main volume (unlike the Hagia Sophia prototype with only two principal apses); however, his version was extended vertically, radically departing from the flattened shapes of early Byzantine temples. Basic composition of the Tiflis cathedral became a standard for the emerging Byzantine style long before its completion.

Construction of the cathedral was launched six years later, April 16, 1871, in the upper part of Alexander’s Garden in Gunib Square (later known as Soborn Square, now part of Rustaveli Avenue). However, less than a year later it was suspended indefinitely. Construction resumed in 1889; in April 1891 the builders finished work on the foundation and proceeded with the wall masonry. 32 years after the contest of 1865, on May 21, 1897, the Cathedral was consecrated by Exarch Vladimir of Georgia. Grimm died the next year.

The cathedral, 40 meters high and with a 13-meter dome, was built to be the largest in the Caucasus region. Internal artwork was inspired by recently completed cathedral of Christ the Saviour in Moscow and St Volodymyr's Cathedral in Kyiv. Icons were based on prototypes by Fyodor Bruni and Victor Vasnetsov.

The cathedral was administered by the Exarchate of Georgia until 1917 when it passed to the recently reinstated autocephalous Georgian Orthodox Patriarchate. In February 1921, its churchyard became a burial ground for the cadets (junkers) of Georgian Military School who fell in the fighting with the Soviet Red Army. In 1930, the Cathedral was demolished by the Soviet government to build the House of Government of the Georgian SSR (later the seat of the Parliament of Georgia) in its place.

== See also ==
- Alexander Nevsky Cathedral, Baku
