= Glory Memorial =

Coordinates: 42.2636°N 42.6572°E

- სამხედრო დიდების მემორიალი ქუთაისში
- Georgia
- For those who died during World War II
- Established: 1981
- Removed: 21 December 2009
- Location: Kutaisi, Georgia
- Designed by: Otar Kalandarishvili, Merab Berdzenishvili

The Glory Memorial (Georgian: სამხედრო დიდების მემორიალი ქუთაისში, romanized: samkhedro didebis memoriali kutaisshi) is a former memorial located in Kutaisi, Georgia and designed by an architect Otar Kalandarishvili with participation of a sculptor-monumentalist Merab Berdzenishvili. It was dedicated in 1981 to the memory of those who died during World War II and featured a soldier on a horse stabbing a German soldier with a spear, an allusion to St. George slaying a dragon.

In the 1990s and 2000s the memorial sustained some damage to its front and two bells went missing. The monument was ordered demolished by then-President Mikheil Saakashvili on 21 December 2009 to make way for a new parliament building, killing two bystanders with falling debris in the hasty process. Due to this, the Governor of Imereti Region was fired. Prison sentences ranging from 2 to 4 years were handed out by the Kutaisi City Court in February 2010 to the management of the Sakpetkmretsvi demolition company. The bronze ornamental features of the monument were removed beforehand with plans to relocate them. The central horseman figure of the monument was re-installed near the parliament building in May 2021 on a new plinth after spending 13 years in storage.

A similarly-shaped Glory Memorial was unveiled in 2010 at a ceremony attended by Vladimir Putin and Georgian opposition leaders Nino Burjanadze and Zurab Noghaideli. Located on Moscow's Poklonnaya Hill, the memorial displays the words, "We were together in the struggle against fascism."
