= Davit Aghmashenebeli =

Davit Aghmashenebeli (Georgian: დავით აღმაშენებელი) may refer to:

- David IV of Georgia, a King of Georgia from 1089 to 1125
- Davit Aghmashenebeli Avenue, a street in Tbilisi
