= Digomi Road =

Digomi Road (Georgian: დიღმის გზა, romanized: dighmis gza ) was one of the most important historical roads leading to Tbilisi, which connected the city with different parts of Georgia and the North Caucasus.

The road from Tiflis to Digomi had two gates. One of them started at Digomi Gate (now at the intersection of Pushkin and Silver streets) and the other at Kojori Gate (now at the junction of Leselidze Street and Freedom Square). The road near the Digomi gate followed the beginning line of the current Tabukashvili Street, guarded the arena from above (today's G. Leonidze Garden), G. Chanturia Street turned towards Rustaveli Avenue and here, near the current Tbilisi Marriott Hotel, it joined the road from Kojori Gate to Rustaveli Avenue. Then the road followed the line of today's Rustaveli Avenue and Kostava Street, crossed several ravines, crossed the bridge over the river Vere, again on Kostava Street and then along Saakadze Square, steeply towards the Kura River and up the right bank of the river. Later this road became part of the Georgian Military Road.
