= Otto Simonson =

German architect (1829–1914)

- Otto Jakob Simonson
- Born: Otto Jakob Simonson; March 23, 1829; Dresden, German Confederation
- Died: May 22, 1914 (aged 85); Riga, Russian Empire
- Occupation: Architect

Otto Jakob Simonson (March 23, 1829 – May 22, 1914) was a German architect known for his contributions to public architecture in Germany, Russia, and Georgia.

A student of Gottfried Semper, Simonson studied at the Royal Academy of Fine Arts in Dresden. In 1853-1854, he built the Great Community Synagogue in Leipzig in. The following year, he went to Saint Petersburg, where he undertook several projects, including remodeling the dining room of the Shuvalov Palace (since 2013 the Fabergé Museum) in a neo-Gothic wooden architectural style. During his time in Saint Petersburg, he married Maria Lacarius (1840–1898), a Latvian national.

In 1856, Simonson was invited to Tiflis (modern-day Tbilisi) by the Russian governorship and was appointed General Architect in 1858. His notable works in Tiflis include the expansion of the Viceroy's Palace and the construction of the classical gymnasium. In collaboration with German landscape architect Heinrich Scharrer, he also designed the Alexander Garden, now known as the 9th of April Park.

Simonson was admitted to the Imperial Academy of Arts in Saint Petersburg and continued his architectural work until 1862. In 1904, he moved to Riga to support his widowed daughter, Olga (1862–1918). During this period, he traveled to Egypt, Greece, and Italy to study regional architectural styles.
