= Merab Berdzenishvili =

Georgian sculptor (1929–2016)

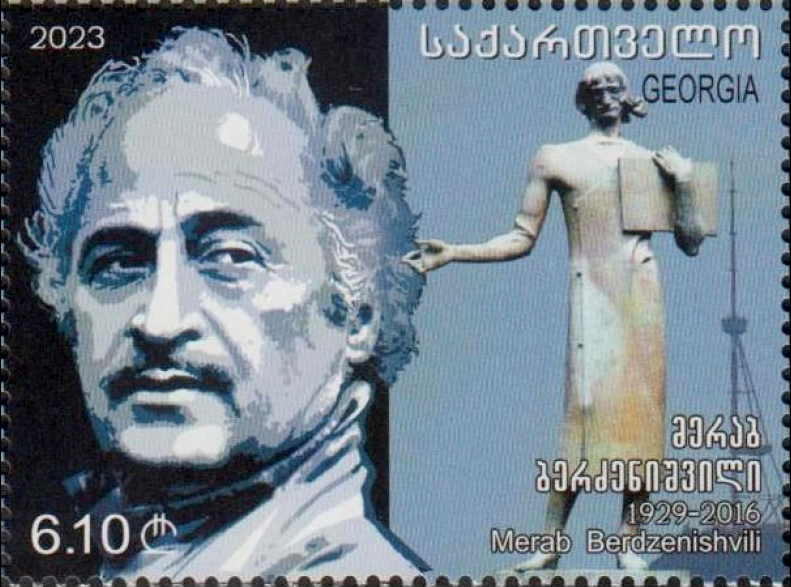
Berdzenishvili on a 2023 stamp of Georgia

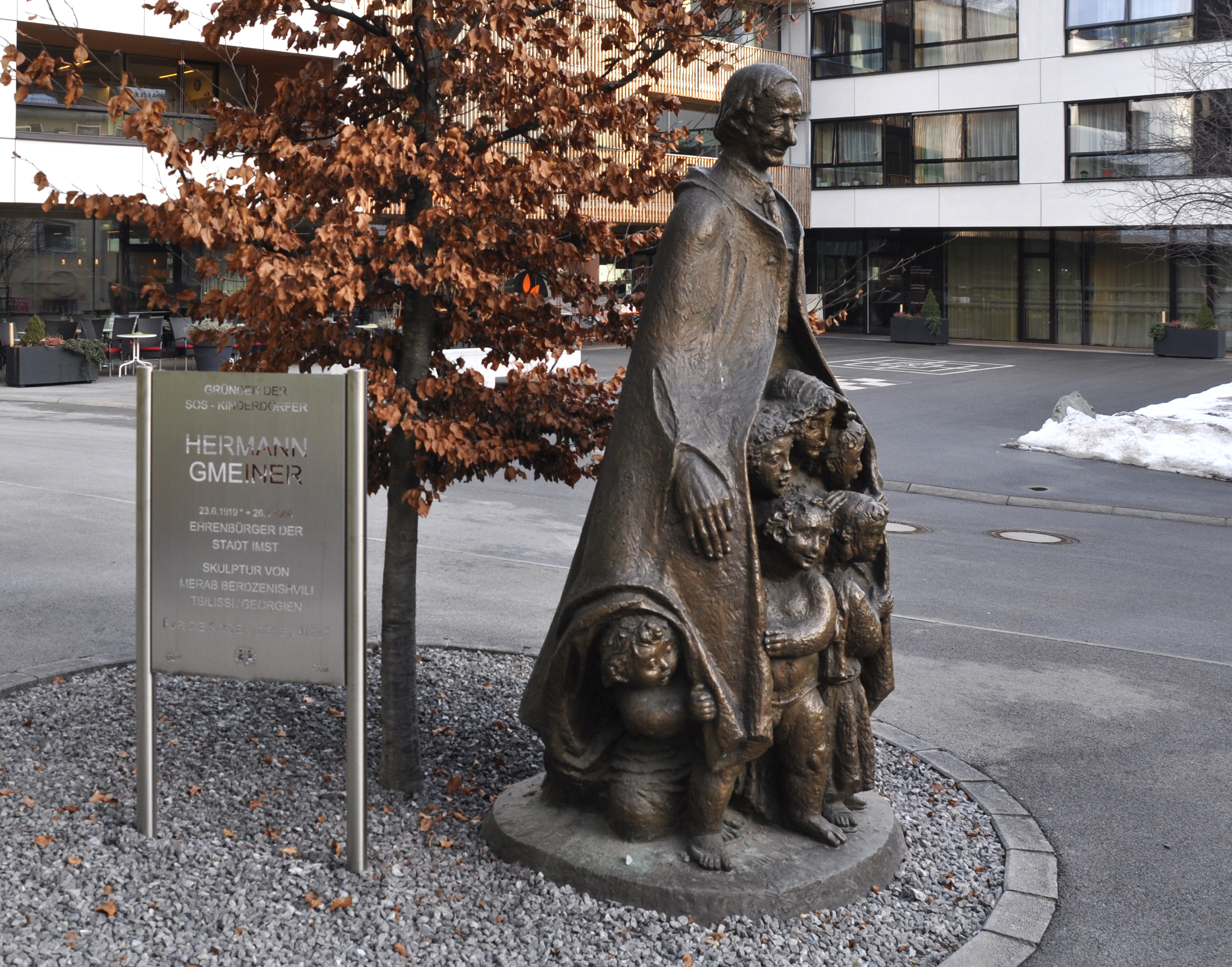
Hermann Gmeiner with children, a statue by Berdzenishvili in Imst, Austria

Merab Berdzenishvili (Georgian: მერაბ ბერძენიშვილი; June 10, 1929 – September 17, 2016) was a Georgian sculptor and artist. He received many awards including the Shota Rustaveli Prize in 1975 and the USSR State Prize in 1976.

Berdzenishvili received multiple awards during his career including People’s Artist of the Soviet Union (1987). In 1995 he was awarded the State Prize of Georgia for the monument commemorating the battle of Didgori.

In 2009, one of his largest works, a monument commemorating the Great Patriotic War, was demolished to make way for the Georgian Parliament Building in Kutaisi. During the demolition, a mother and her daughter were killed by flying masonry. Later that year, the sculpture was reconstructed in Moscow.
