= Government of Tbilisi =

Georgian municipal government

Self-Government of Tbilisi City ქალაქ თბილისის თვითმმართველობა
- Seal of Tbilisi
- Formation: October 1991; 34 years ago
- Founding document: Local Self-Government Code of Georgia
- Country: Georgia
- Website: tbilisi.gov.ge

Legislative branch
- Legislature: Tbilisi City Assembly
- Meeting place: Tbilisi Assembly Building

Executive branch
- Mayor: Mayor of Tbilisi
- Appointed by: Election

The Self-Government of Tbilisi (Georgian: თბილისის თბითმმართველობა or თბილისის მთავრობა) is organized under the Constitution of Georgia and Local Self-Government Code of Georgia and provides for a mayor-council system. The mayor is elected to a four-year term and is responsible for the administration of city government. The Tbilisi City Assembly is a unicameral body consisting of 50 members, selected through a mixed electoral system, normally for four-year terms. Ten of them are elected from a local districts of the city. The remaining forty members are chosen by political parties and are apportioned according to their support citywide.

Tbilisi self-government went through a difficult and interesting process before its formation. Tbilisi, as the political and cultural center of Georgia, has been in the center of multifaceted attention for centuries. In the Middle Ages, the ruler of Tbilisi - Mourav, was personally appointed by the king, which also indicated the uniqueness of his political status. The capital was passing from hand to hand due to the invasion of many enemies in Georgia. During the rule of the Russian Empire, Tiflis was the central city of the Caucasus, where the residence of the viceroy of the Caucasus was also located. Tiflis was ruled by city heads in 19th century Georgia.

Tbilisi had a special status during the Soviet period. After the restoration of independence in 1991, the Law of the Supreme Council of the Republic of Georgia "On the Capital of Georgia" entered into force. With this law, the territorial body became the local body of state power, and the city hall and the prefecture became the governing body. The latter was abolished by order of January 4, 1992, and after the Civil War, power was transferred to the temporary special representatives of the Military Council of the Republic of Georgia. On December 19, 1992, the Parliament of Georgia approved a regulation, according to which the City Council of the City Hall was instructed to exercise its powers before the elections of the local representative body of Tbilisi. In 1998, the Parliament of Georgia adopted a new law "On the Capital of Georgia - Tbilisi", according to which the self-government in Tbilisi is exercised by a representative body - Tbilisi City Assembly, and the executive body - Tbilisi City Hall.
