= Tbilisi cable car crash =

1990 cable car crash in Tbilisi, Georgia

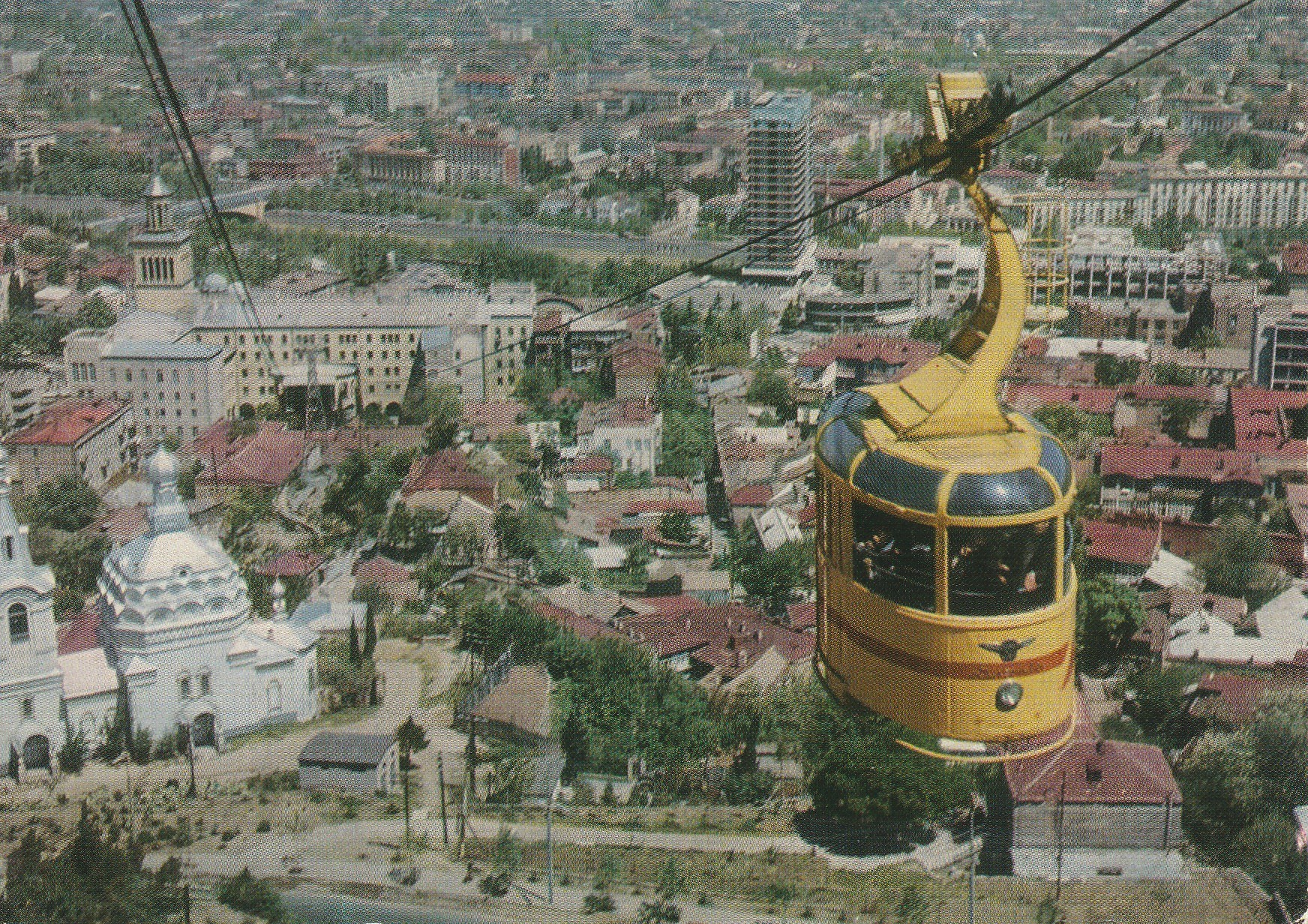
- A cable car like the one in the 1990 accident.
- Date: 1 June 1990
- Time: 15:15
- Location: Tbilisi, Soviet Georgia; 41°41′57″N 44°47′18″E
- Cause: Unknown.
- Deaths: 19
- Injuries: at least 42

The Tbilisi cable car crash was an aerial tramway accident in Tbilisi, the capital of Soviet Georgia, on 1 June 1990, resulting in 19 deaths and at least 42 injuries.

The accident involved two gondolas on a ropeway route between Rustaveli Avenue and Mount Mtatsminda. Red gondola number 1 was on its way down from the slope of the mountain, nearing the lower supporting tower, and red gondola number 2 was nearing an upper tower, when the hauling rope broke inside the coupler of the upper gondola. Both gondolas rolled down simultaneously. The lower gondola slammed into the wall of the lower station, killing four and injuring many others. The upper gondola generated a higher speed (the length of ropeway was 863.3 metres or 2,832 feet); on reaching the lower support tower, it struck the broken hauling rope, which was hanging on the tower, causing the cable to tear the gondola apart.

A cut-open gondola was hanging above the rooftops as a result of the collision's extreme force, which caused the track cable to fall off the tower. Additionally, this led to the cabin sliding down and colliding with the roof of a six-story building below. This caused even further destruction to the gondola and caused people to fall 20 metres (66 ft) onto the rooftops and ground below. Nineteen people were killed and at least 15 badly injured. Most were children on a sightseeing tour to Tbilisi from School Number 5 of the regional town of Akhaltsikhe, to celebrate Children's Day. Surviving witnesses from both gondolas say that the brakes did not work in either of the gondolas, despite the desperate attempts of guides and passengers who helped them to pull the brakes.

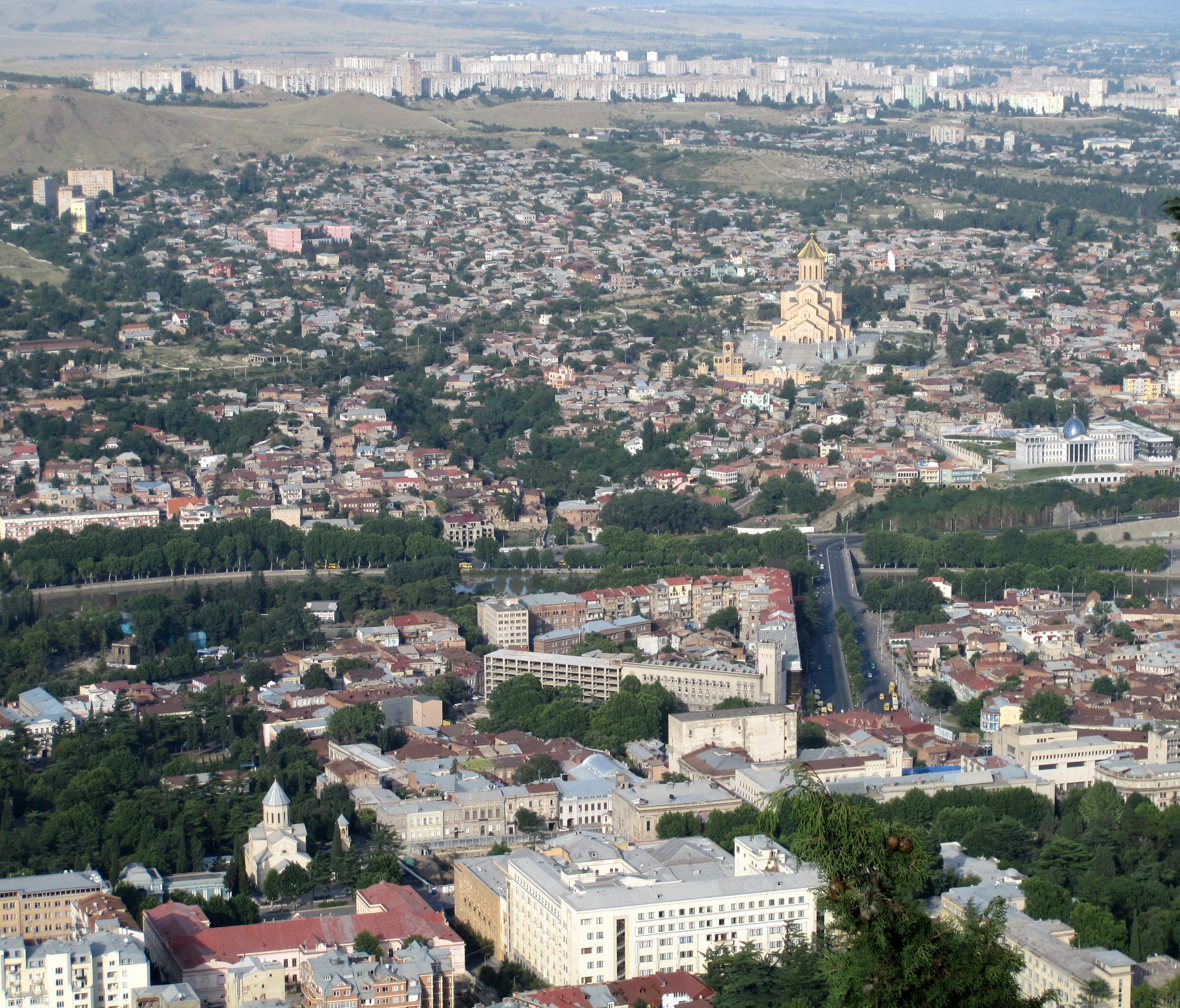
Panoramic view from Mt. Mtatsminda down on Rustaveli Avenue in 2009

In 1988, two years prior to the accident, the cable car underwent major reconstruction under the lead of head engineer Vakhtang Lejava. Originally the cable car used three supporting towers. Redesigning this meant replacing the 20-metre-high (66 ft) lower mast with a new 25-metre-high (82 ft) mast. Two short upper masts (10 to 12 m or 33 to 39 ft high) were also replaced by one 20-metre-high (66 ft) mast. Prior to this change, the gondolas had a slight climbing angle on the two upper masts. Using a single higher mast caused the new gondolas to run from the upper station horizontal to the mast and then, with a sharp angle, head down. The standard oval Georgian gondolas (with a capacity of 25 per gondola), produced in Tbilisi by Tbilisi Aircraft Manufacturing, were replaced by larger rectangular Italian ones built by Lovisolo and provided by Ceretti and Tanfani, as they provided greater passenger capacity (40 per gondola). The braking system of the new gondolas did not function properly – while climbing over the upper mast, the braking system would incorrectly engage. The service staff would have to climb on top of the gondola and turn it off manually when this occurred. To avoid this inconvenience, the brakes were just turned off. Additionally, on the day of the accident, both gondolas were over-capacity: the lower gondola had 46 passengers on board, the upper gondola held 47 passengers.

Accident investigation documentation does not identify the cause of the hauling rope breaking inside the coupler. Many unanswered questions still remain, and the cause of the accident is not known.

The track and hauling cables were dismantled while the damaged gondolas were dismantled after three years. The masts and the stations were kept intact. The aerial tramway was never restored. In 2014, the upper station and both supporting masts were dismantled due to planned restoration of the tramway as a reversible gondola cable car, running from a relocated lower station. However, the upper station location remained the same. The old lower station, due to its unique architecture, is a cultural heritage object. The planned restoration was abandoned due to local opposition and visual flaws of the new lower station on one of the main squares of the city in front of Radisson Hotel. Another issue with the restoration was the oversized five supporting masts, two of them being located on hilly streets, causing already narrow streets to reduce even more in width.

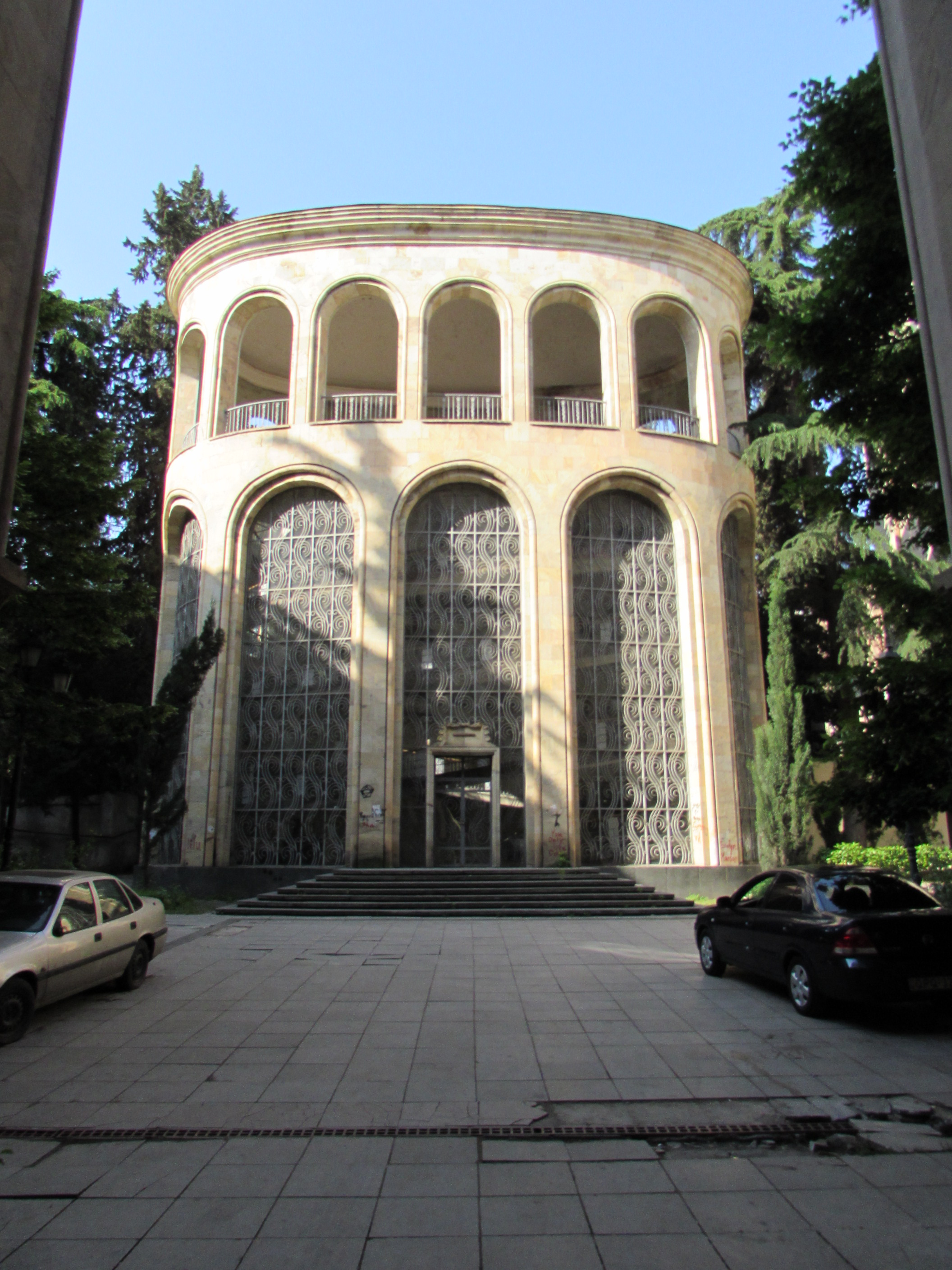
Disused cablecar station as seen in 2015

From 2012 until 2021 plans to reconstruct the aerial tramway have failed to materialize. In 2012 Austrian-Swiss Doppelmayr Garaventa Group was contracted to produce parts, which it did. However, renovation works stalled because of the high density small housing which appeared in the backyard of the lower station. According to Tbilisi mayor Kaladze residents living near the Rustaveli Avenue station refused to relocate caused the delay. New construction tenders initiated in 2020-2021 and failed twice. Prior to his reelection as mayor in October 2021, Kaladze said the cable car line will be operational by the end of 2022, while reconstruction work allegedly started on both stations. The reconstruction is expected to cost $16 million. The major challenge is to adapt the lower station backyard for a monocable detachable gondola infrastructure, because the lower station was only designed for aerial tramway type of cable car in 1958.

== See also ==
- Cable car accidents and disasters by death toll
