= David Agmashenebeli Avenue =

Avenue in Tbilisi, Georgia

Coordinates: 41°42′37″N 44°47′46″E

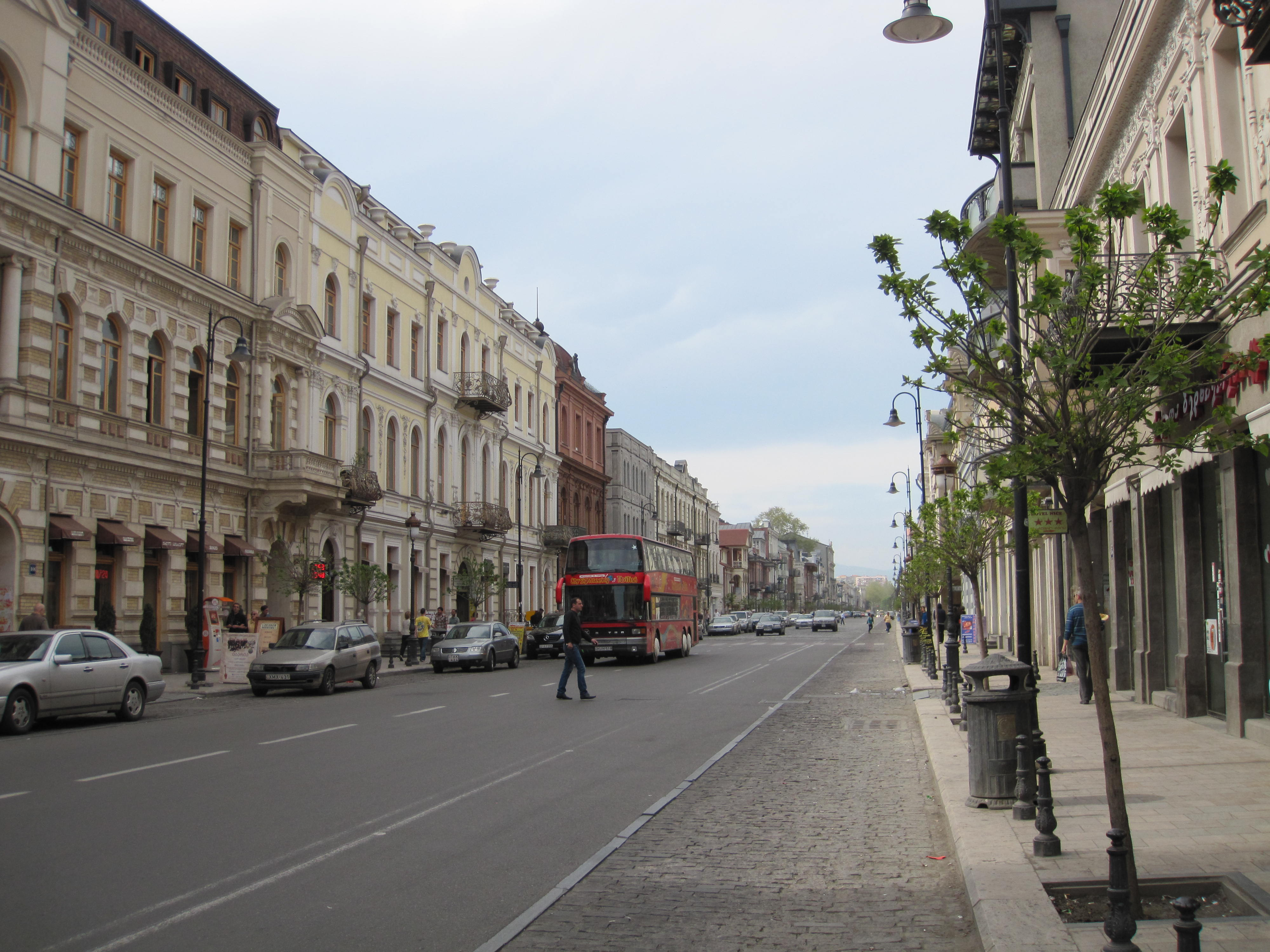
- Interactive map of David Agmashenebeli Avenue
- Native name: დავით აღმაშენებლის გამზირი (Georgian)
- Former name: Plekhanov Avenue
- Part of: Tbilisi
- Namesake: David IV of Georgia
- Postal code: 0102 (#1-89, 2-146), 0112 (#91-199, 148-184)
- Nearest metro station: Marjanishvili Station

David Aghmashenebeli Avenue (Georgian: დავით აღმაშენებლის გამზირი) is one of the main avenues in the historical part of Tbilisi, known for its 19th-century classical architecture. The avenue is located on the left bank of the Kura River and runs from Saarbrücken Square to Giorgi Tsabadze street.

Currently named after David IV of Georgia, it was originally called Alexanderdorf, then Mikheil Street in 1851, and Plekhanov Street after the Russian revolutionary Georgi Plekhanov from 1918 to 1988. Since 2010, the avenue has seen major rehabilitation works, which includes the renovation of seventy buildings, as well as the road, sidewalks and street lighting.

Agmashenebeli is easily accessible by metro at Marjanishvili Station, which is a single stop away from the city's second historical artery, Rustaveli Avenue.

== Gallery ==
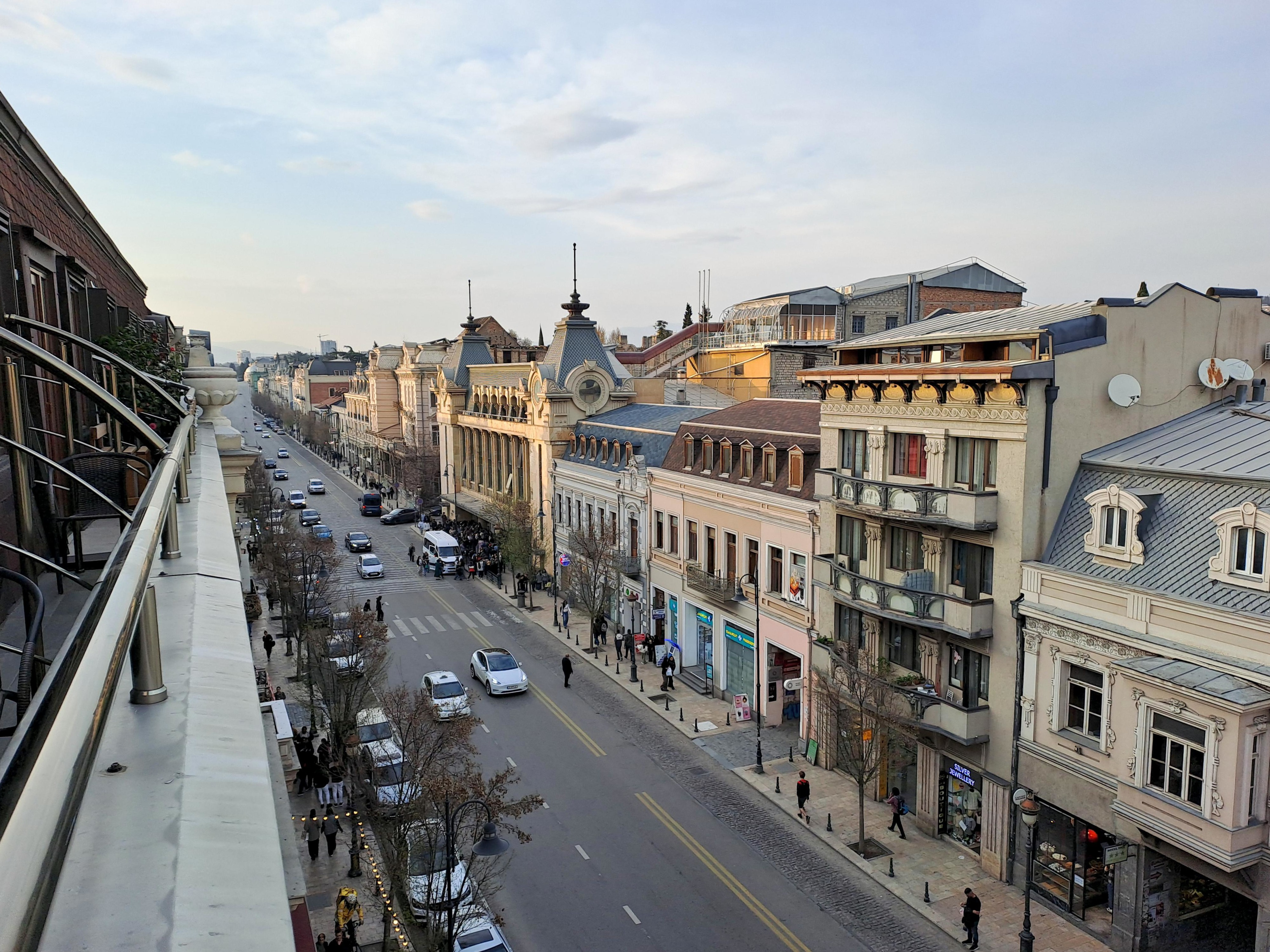

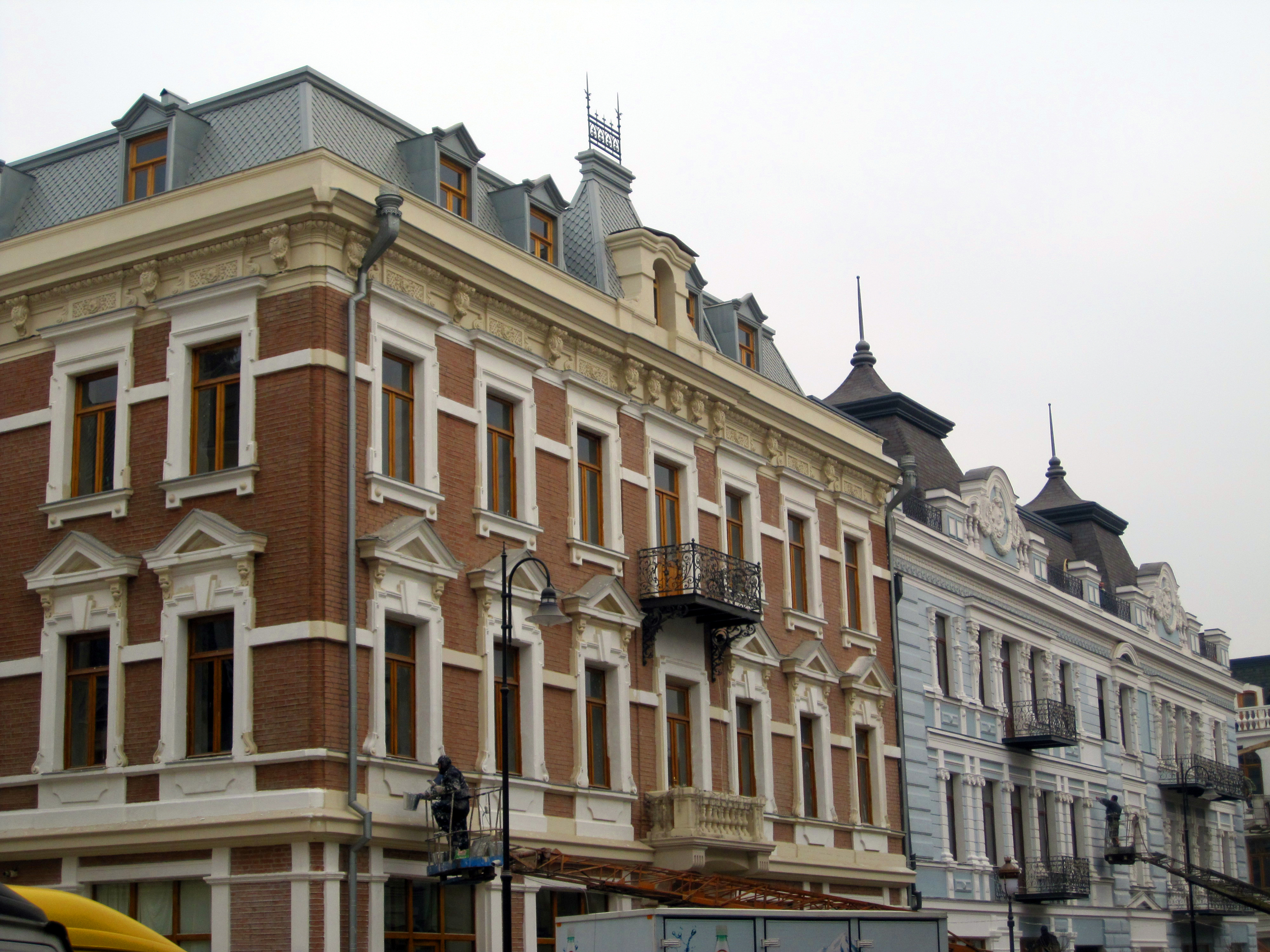

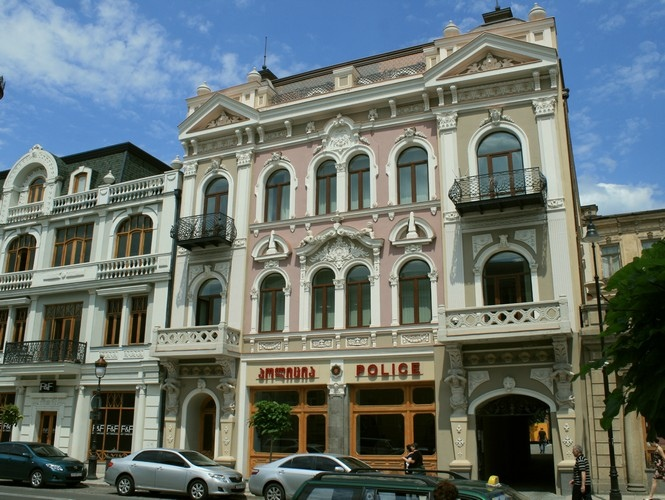

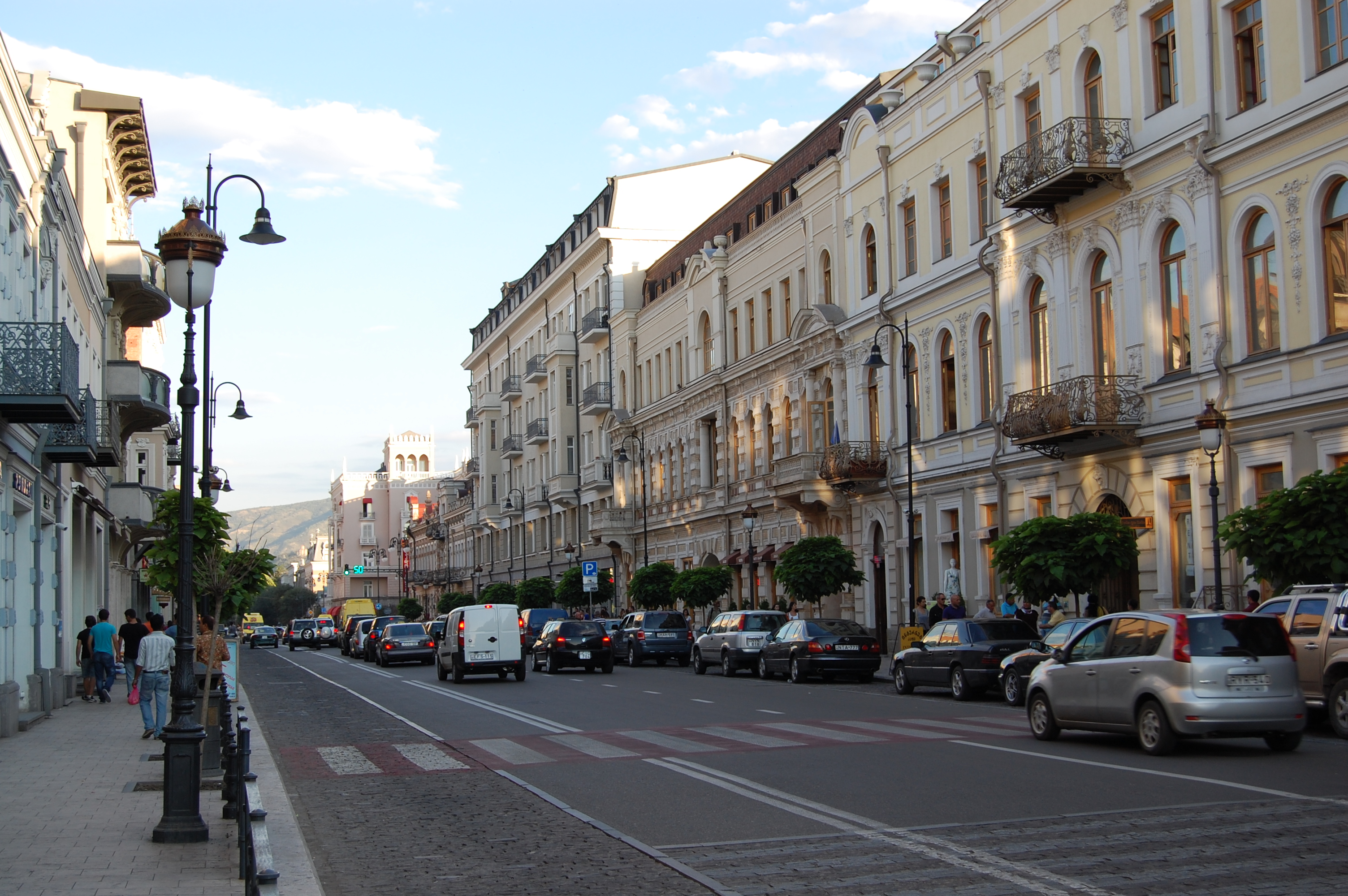

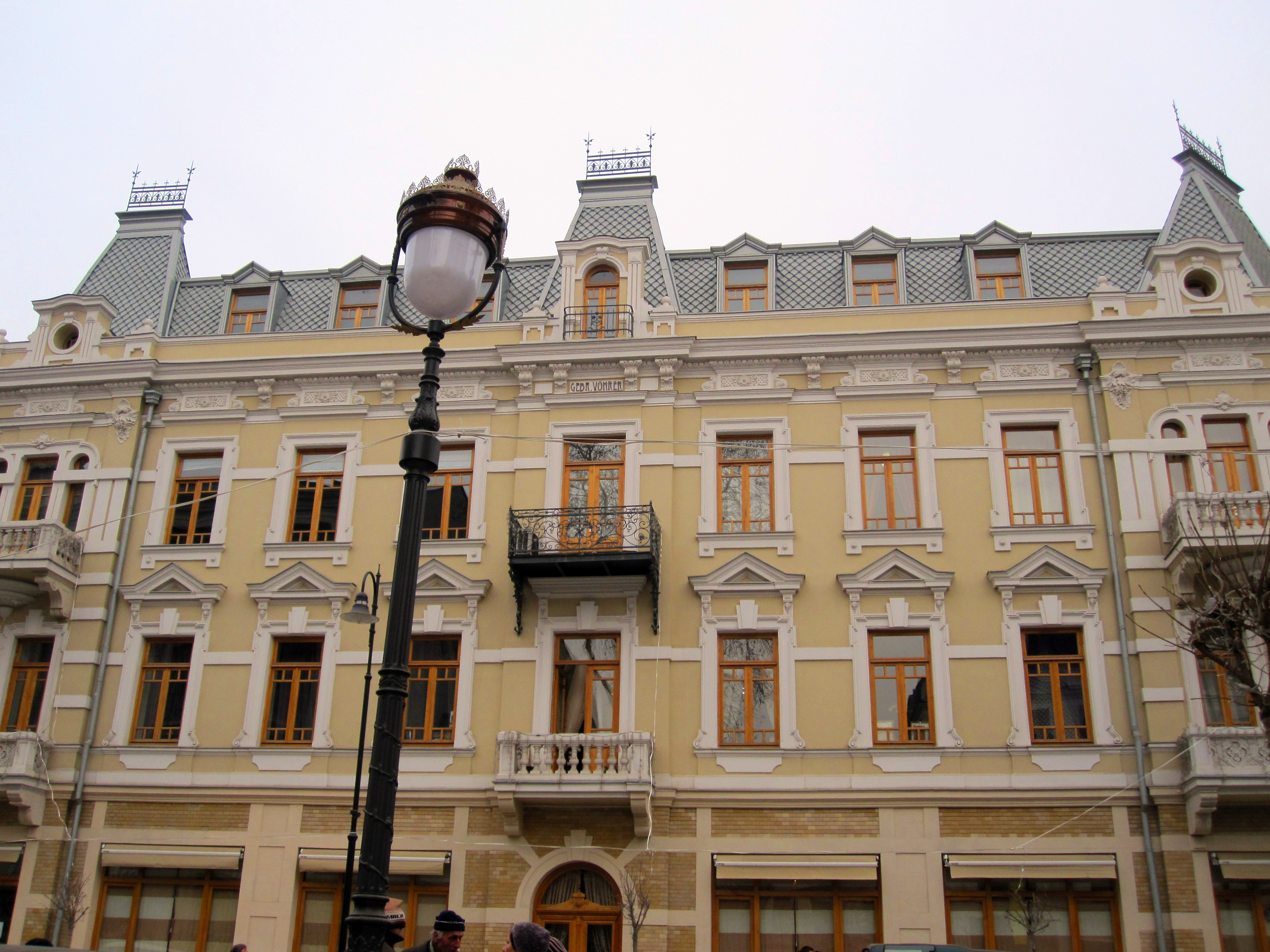

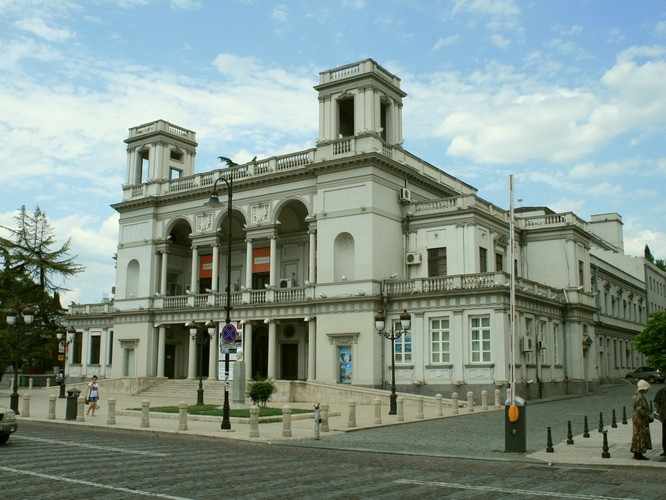

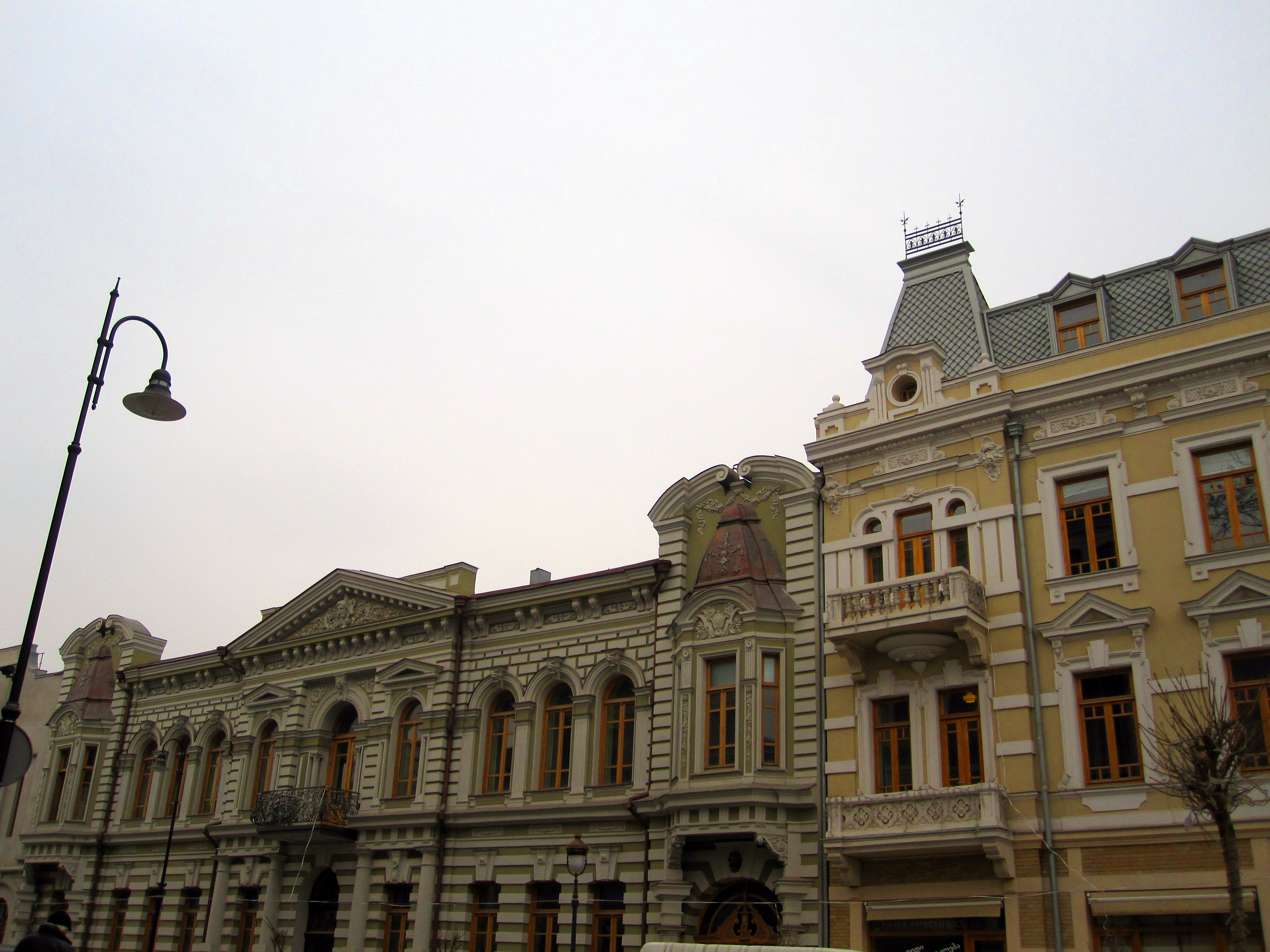

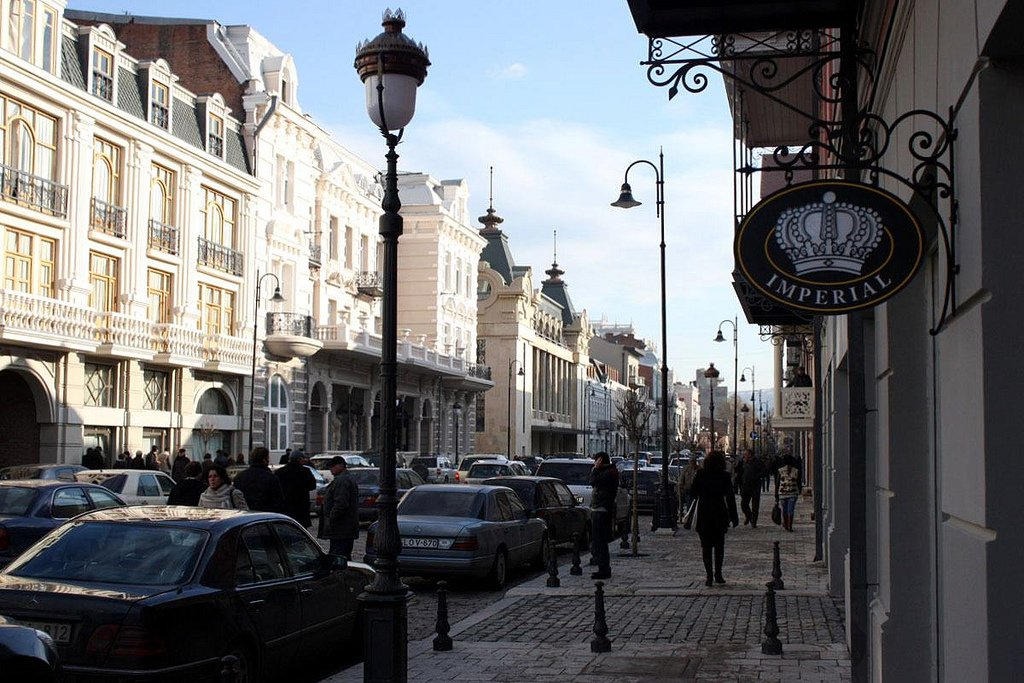

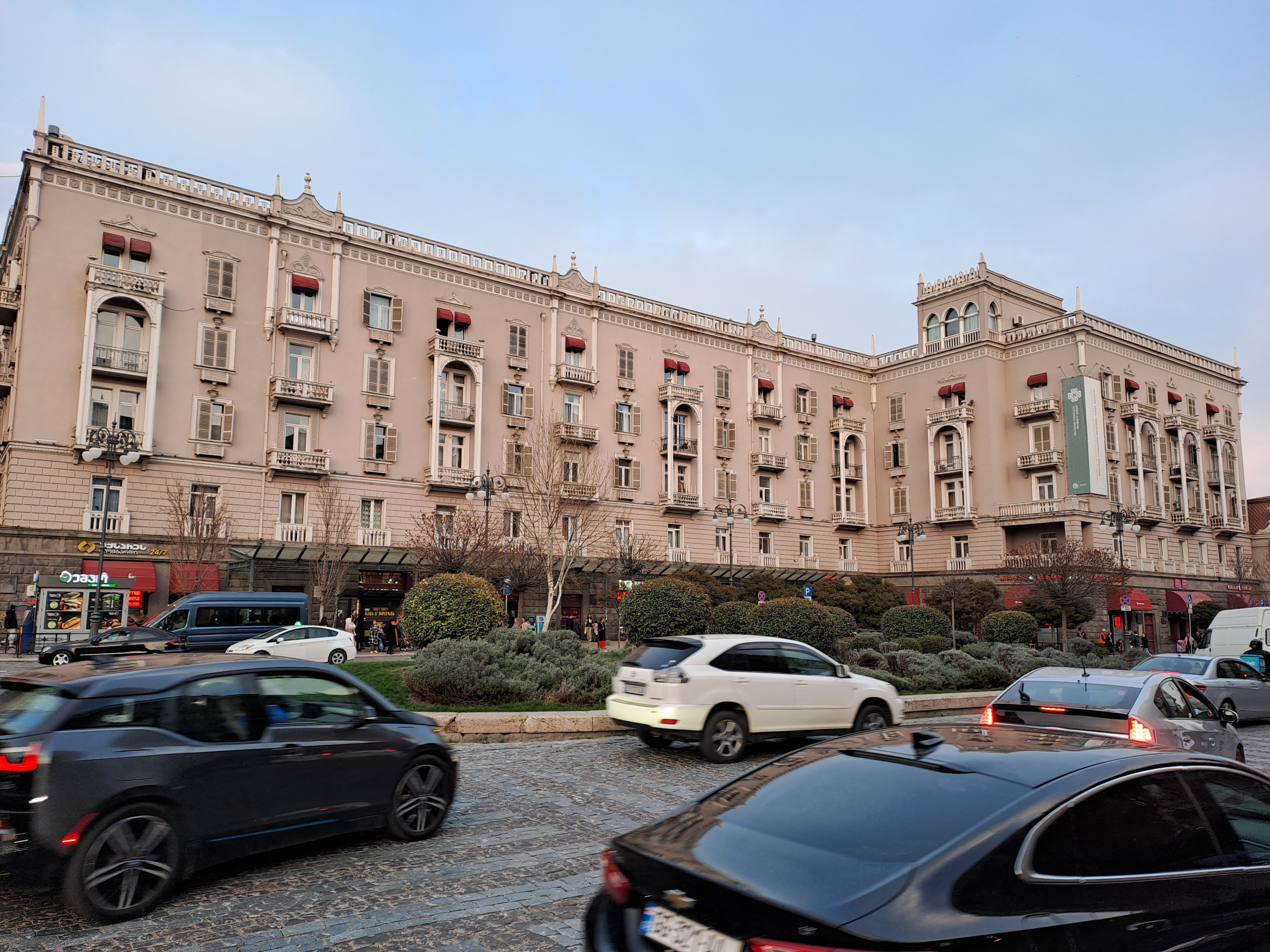
