= Bedross Der Matossian =

American history professor

- Born: 1978 (age 47–48); East Jerusalem
- Education: Columbia University; Hebrew University of Jerusalem
- Scientific career
- Fields: Ethnic politics in the Middle East, inter-ethnic violence in the Ottoman Empire, Palestinian history, and the history of Armenian Genocide
- Workplaces: University of Nebraska–Lincoln Massachusetts Institute of Technology University of Chicago (Past President of the Society for Armenian Studies)
- Website: history.unl.edu/bedross-der-matossian

Bedross Der Matossian is the Elwood N. and Katherine Thompson Distinguished Professor of Modern World History at the University of Nebraska–Lincoln. Der Matossian was born and raised in East Jerusalem.

== Education and career ==
Der Matossian is a graduate of the Hebrew University of Jerusalem, where he began his graduate studies in the Department of Islamic and Middle Eastern Studies. He completed his Ph.D. in Middle East History in the Department of Middle Eastern, South Asian, and African Studies (MESAAS) at Columbia University in 2008.

From 2008 to 2010, he was a lecturer of Middle East History in the Faculty of History at the Massachusetts Institute of Technology. He was appointed as the Dumanian Visiting professor in the University of Chicago for the spring quarter of 2014.

His areas of interest include ethnic politics in the Middle East, inter-ethnic violence in the Ottoman Empire, Palestinian history, and the history of Armenian Genocide.

Der Matossian was formerly the president of the Society for Armenian Studies. He is also the series editor of "Armenians in the Modern and Early Modern World". published by I.B.Tauris and Bloomsbury Press. He serves on the board of directors of multiple international educational institutions and on the editorial board of multiple journals, the most prominent of which is the flagship journal of the field: International Journal of Middle East Studies. He is the Director of Genocide Research at the Zoryan Institute.

In 2026, he received a Guggenheim Fellowship from the John Simon Guggenheim Memorial Foundation.

== Books ==
- Der Matossian, Bedross (2026), ed. Shattered Truthes: Denial of Genocide in the Digital Age Lincoln, NE: University of Nebraska Press. ISBN 9781496244093
- Der Matossian, Bedross with Edita Gzoyan (2026), eds. The Concentration Camps of the Armenian Genocide London: Bloomsbury Press. ISBN 9780755657636
- Der Matossian, Bedross (2025) Adana Katliamları: 20. Yüzyıl Başında Devrim ve Şiddet İstanbul: İletişim Yayınları. ISBN 9789750538476
- Der Matossian, Bedross (2023), ed. The Armenian Social Democrat Hnchakian Party: Politics, Ideology and Transnational History" London: I.B.Tauris. ISBN 9780755651368
- Der Matossian, Bedross (2023), ed. Denial of Genocides in the Twenty-First Century Lincoln, NE: University of Nebraska Press. ISBN 978-1-4962-2510-8
- Der Matossian, Bedross The Horrors of Adana: Revolution and Violence in the Early Twentieth Century. Stanford, CA: Stanford University Press. 2022. ISBN 9781503631021.
- Der Matossian, Bedross (2020), ed. The First Republic of Armenia (1918-1920) on its Centenary: Politics, Gender, and Diplomacy. The Press at California State University Fresno. ISBN 978-0-912201-67-2.
- Der Matossian, Bedross (2019) with Barlow Der Mugrdechian, eds. Western Armenian in the 21st Century: Challenges and New Approaches |The Press at California State University Fresno. ISBN 0912201606
- Der Matossian, Bedross (2018). Sulaiman Mourad, and Naomi Koltun-Fromm, eds. Routledge Handbook on Jerusalem. Milton Park, Abingdon, Oxon; New York, NY :Routledge. ISBN 0367580462.
- Der Matossian, Bedross (2016). Hüsrana Uğrayan Devrim: Geç Dönem Osmanlı İmparatorluğu'nda Hürriyet ve Şiddet. Istanbul: İletişim Publications. ISBN 9750521234
- Der Matossian, Bedross (2014). Shattered Dreams of Revolution: From Liberty to Violence in the Late Ottoman Empire. Stanford University Press. ISBN 978-0-8047-9270-7.
