= Seal of Tbilisi =

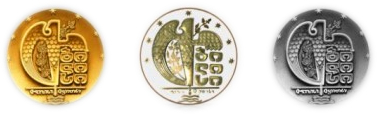
Variants of the seal of Tbilisi

The seal of Tbilisi, the capital of Georgia, was designed in the late 1980s and reconfirmed as an official seal of the city on 8 June 2005 traditional Georgian shield where the Georgian Mkhedruli inscription თბილისი ("Tbilisi") with the capitalized letter თ form a stylized falcon and pheasant illustrating the legend of Tbilisi's origin. Along the upper edge are seven small seven-point stars lined up in crescent format. An intervening oak twig is symbolic of sturdiness and durability and creates a cross-like partition at the bottom of the shield which shelters the name of Tbilisi written in historic Georgian scripts – Asomtavruli and Nuskhuri. It rests upon a water wave symbolizing the Mtkvari River on which the city is situated.

The coat of arms of Tbilisi (Tiflis) under Imperial Russian rule (19th century)
