= Evgeni Gegechkori =

Georgian aristocrat, politician and revolutionary

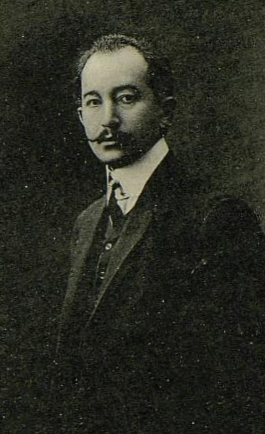
- Evgeni Gegechkori (1910)
- Born: Georgian: ევგენი გეგეჭკორი 20 January 1881; Martvili, Kutais Governorate, Russian Empire
- Died: 5 June 1954 (aged 73); Paris, France
- Education: Imperial Moscow University
- Occupation: Politician

Evgeni Gegechkori (Georgian: ევგენი გეგეჭკორი) (20 January 1881, in Martvili – 5 June 1954, in Paris) was a Georgian nobleman, politician, and Social Democratic revolutionary.

Born of a noble family, he entered the Social Democratic student movement in 1903 during his studies at the Imperial Moscow University and soon joined the Menshevik wing of the Russian Social Democratic Labour Party. He was involved in the 1905 revolution in Georgia and was elected a member to the Third State Duma for the Kutais Governorate from 1907 to 1912. During the February Revolution in 1917, Gegechkori became commissar for the Russian Provisional Government in western Georgia. From 28 November 1917 to 26 March 1918 he chaired the Transcaucasian Commissariat and served as minister of labor before leading the Transcaucasian Sejm and becoming its minister of war. On May 26, 1918, he signed the Act of Declaration of Independence of the Democratic Republic of Georgia. After the establishment of the Democratic Republic of Georgia in May 1918, he became its Minister of Foreign Affairs and also served as the Minister of Justice. From the same period Evgeni Gegechkori was appointed as the Deputy Chairman of the Government.

In 1921, he briefly served as a Minister of Justice. After the Red Army invasion of Georgia, Gegechkori left for France in March 1921. From 1953 until his death, he headed the Georgian government in exile.

== Bibliography ==
- A. Andreev; D. Tsygankov (2010). Imperial Moscow University: 1755-1917: encyclopedic dictionary. Moscow: Russian political encyclopedia (ROSSPEN). p. 145. ISBN 978-5-8243-1429-8.
