= Rustaveli Avenue =

Avenue in Tbilisi, Georgia

Coordinates: 41°41′39″N 44°47′59″E

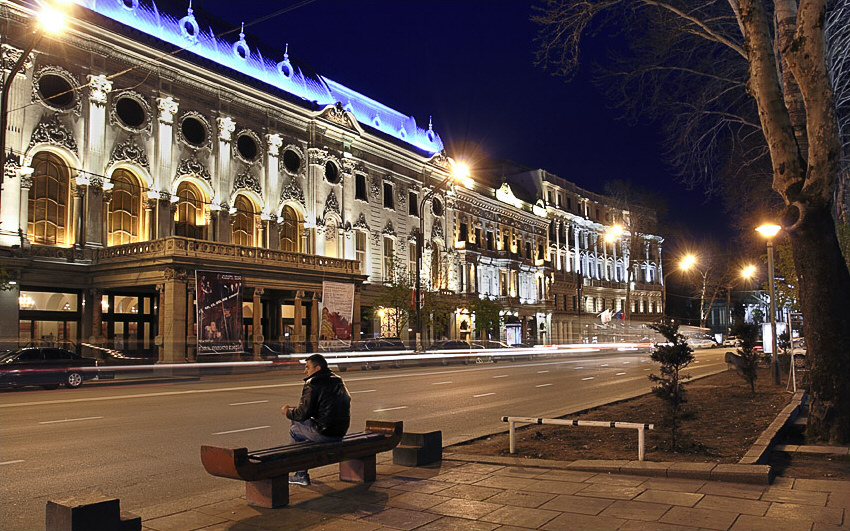
- Rustaveli theatre
- Interactive map of Rustaveli Avenue
- Native name: რუსთაველის გამზირი (Georgian)
- Former name: Golovin Street
- Part of: Tbilisi, Georgia
- Namesake: Shota Rustaveli
- Length: 1.5 km (0.93 mi)
- Postal code: 0108 (#5-37, 10-54); 0118 (#8); 0105 (#1-3, 2-4)
- Nearest metro station: Rustaveli; Tavisuplebis Moedani (Liberty Square)

Rustaveli Avenue (Georgian: რუსთაველის გამზირი), formerly known as Golovin Street, is the central avenue in Tbilisi named after the medieval Georgian poet, Shota Rustaveli.

The avenue starts at Freedom Square and extends for about 1.5 km in length, before it turns into an extension of Kostava Street. Rustaveli is often considered the main thoroughfare of Tbilisi due to the numerous governmental, public, cultural, and business buildings that are located along or near the avenue. The Parliament of Georgia building, the Georgian National Opera Theater, the Rustaveli State Academic Theater, the Georgian Academy of Sciences, Kashveti Church, the Georgian Museum of Fine Arts, Simon Janashia Museum of Georgia (part of the Georgian National Museum), and Biltmore Hotel Tbilisi among others, are all located on Rustaveli.

== History ==
Rustaveli Avenue has its origins in the Digomi Road which connected Tbilisi to the North Caucasus via the village of Digomi to the city's north. The course of the Digomi Road partly coincided with that of the current avenue. Mikhail Vorontsov, the Russian viceroy of the Caucasus, ordered the construction of the current wide avenue in the 1840s as part of a project to Europeanize the Persian-style city. The avenue was initially named Golovinskiy prospekt (Russian: Головинскій проспектъ) after Yevgeny Golovin, an earlier Russian viceroy. In 1918, the street received its current name in honor of medieval Georgian poet Shota Rustaveli.

In 1959, an aerial cable car was opened between Rustaveli Avenue and Mount Mtatsminda. In 1966, the Rustaveli metro station opened at the avenue's northern end, followed in 1967 by the Liberty Square metro station at the avenue's southern end. The cable car to Mtatsminda was closed in 1990 following a deadly accident that killed 19 people.

In November 2023, Tbilisi mayor Kakha Kaladze announced that the avenue would undergo renovation starting in 2024 and lasting about two years. In October 2024, the Rustaveli–Mtatsminda cable car was reopened.

=== Political events and protests ===
In May 1918, both the Georgian and Azerbaijani declarations of independence were signed in the former Viceroy's Palace on Rustaveli Avenue.

In 1956, demonstrations against Nikita Khrushchev's policy of de-Stalinization were held on Rustaveli Avenue. The pro-Stalin protests were violently suppressed by Soviet troops.

In 1989, tens of thousands of pro-independence Georgians gathered before the House of Government on Rustaveli Avenue. An attack by the Soviet Spetsnaz forces killed many protesters in the April 9 tragedy. Two years later, on 9 April 1991, the restoration of Georgian independence was declared at the same location on Rustaveli Avenue. The events of 9 April 1989 established that segment of Rustaveli Avenue as a spot of particular symbolic importance in Georgian culture.

In 1991, the street was the epicenter of an internal conflict that led to a coup d'état against president Zviad Gamsakhurdia, the deaths of over 100 people, and the destruction of some buildings on the eastern part of the avenue. In 2003, many Georgians gathered on Rustaveli Avenue to protest the parliamentary election in what became known as the Rose Revolution. Protests against the government of president Mikheil Saakashvili, previously the leader of the Rose Revolution, were held on Rustaveli Avenue in 2007 and 2011.

In 2019, a series of protests against the ruling Georgian Dream party took place on the avenue. In the following years Rustaveli was the site of further protests against Georgian Dream: the 2020 post-election protests, the 2023–2024 protests against a "foreign influence" law, and the 2024 post-election protests. In 2026, the government began rehabilitation work on the avenue, closing it to traffic until the end of the year.

== Accessibility ==
The thoroughfare is served by the Tbilisi Metro and buses. It is one metro stop away from another historical artery of Tbilisi, Agmashenebeli Avenue.

== Landmarks ==
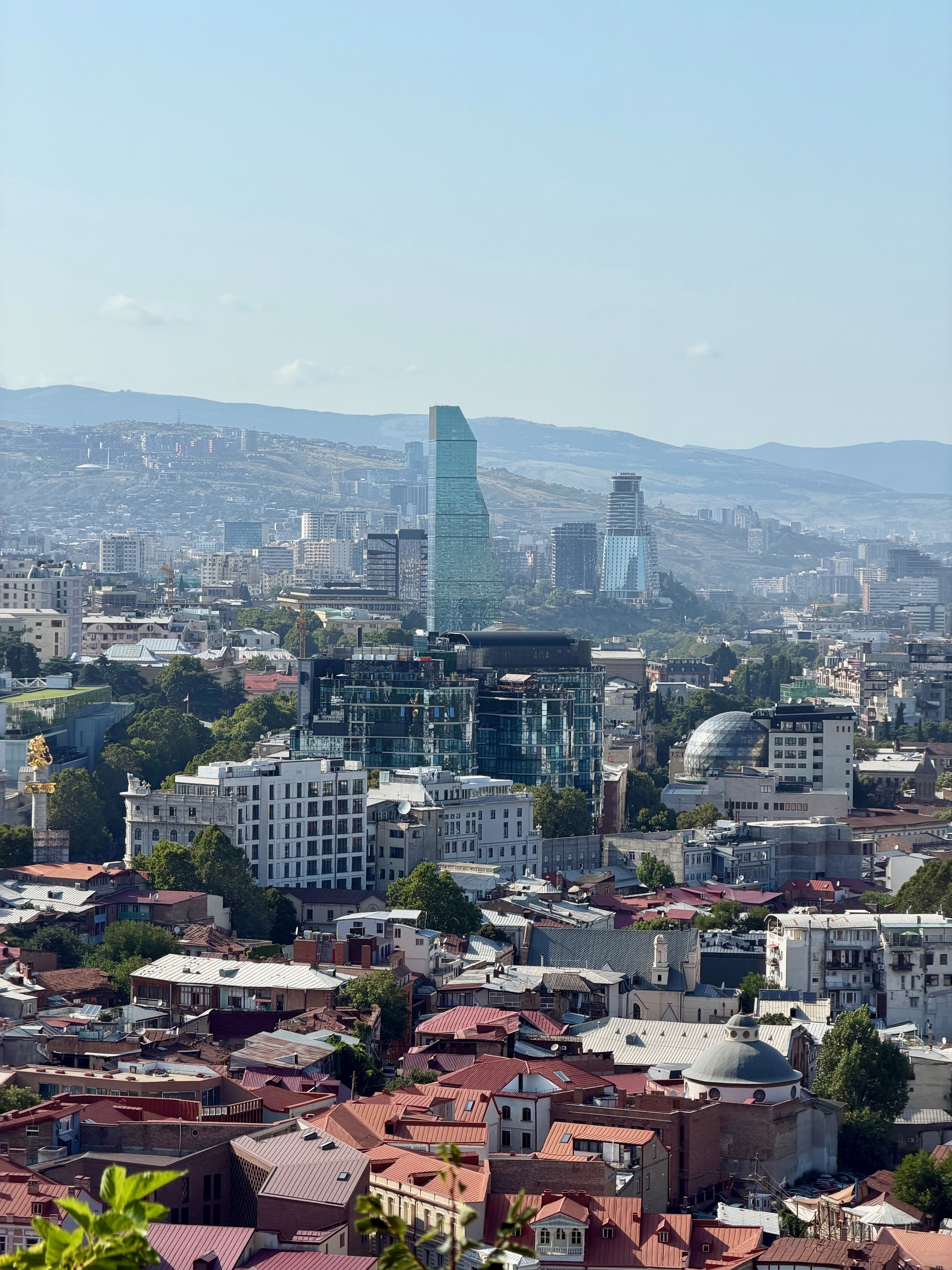
A mix of old and new buildings along Rustaveli Avenue (center left), 2026.

1 - Residential building (1937-1939, architects S. Kubaneishvili, A. Kurdiani, M. Melia)

3 - National Museum of Georgia former Caucasian Museum (1913-1917, architect M. N. Neprintsev). In 1929, the facade of the building was reconstructed according to the project of architect N. Severov

5 - Rustaveli cinema (1938, architect N. Severov)

6 - Former palace of the governor - Vorontsov Palace (1868, architect O. Simonson), now the National Youth and Children's Palace

8 - Building of the Parliament of Georgia (1933-1938 - upper building, 1946-1953 - main building, architect V. Kokorin with the participation of G. Lesava)

9 - Kashveti Church (1910, architect L. Bilfeldt)

10 - Tiflis Gymnasium (1825-1831, architect A. I. Melnikov, rebuilt, now - The First Classical Gymnasium In Tbilisi)

11 - Tbilisi Art Gallery ("Blue Gallery") (1888, architect A. Salzmann). Former military-historical museum "Temple of Glory"

12 - Former Communications House (1932-1933, architect K. I. Solomonov) is one of the examples of constructivism in Tbilisi. The facade of the building in 1953-1955 was reconstructed and redesigned according to the project of architect I. N. Chkhenkeli

13 - Tbilisi Marriott Hotel, former Majestik Hotel (1915, architect G. Ter-Mikelov)

16 - Former House of Military Officers (1916, architect D. Chisliev)

17b - Shota Rustaveli Theater (1887, architect A. Szymkiewicz)

25 - Georgian National Opera Theater (1896, architect V. A. Shreter)

29 - Former branch of the Institute of Marxism-Leninism (1933-1938, architect A. Shchusev)

37 - Apartment house of Melik-Azaryants (1915, architect N. Obolonsky)

42 - Building of the publishing house "Zarya Vostok" (1926-1929, architect D. G. Chisliev)

52 - The building of the Gruzugol Trust (1949-1954, architects M. A. Chkhikvadze and K. C. Chkheidze). The prototype of the building was the Stockholm City Hall (1923, architect R. Estberg). Currently, the building belongs to the Academy of Sciences of Georgia

== See also ==
- David Agmashenebeli Avenue
