= Georgian Parliament Building (Tbilisi) =

Cultural heritage monument in Georgia

- Interactive map of the Georgian Parliament Building area

General information
- Location: 8 Rustaveli Avenue, Tbilisi, Georgia
- Coordinates: 41.696765°N 44.798026°E
- Construction started: 1933; 93 years ago
- Completed: 1953; 73 years ago
- Owner: Parliament of Georgia

Cultural Heritage Monument of Georgia
- Official name: Parliament
- Designated: October 1, 2007; 18 years ago
- Item Number in Cultural Heritage Portal: 4845
- Date of entry in the registry: October 11, 2007; 18 years ago

The Parliament of Georgia Building (Georgian: საქართველოს პარლამენტის შენობა, romanized: sakartvelos p'arlament'is shenoba) is the meeting place of the Parliament of Georgia, located in Tbilisi, the capital of Georgia. It is located in 8 Rustaveli Avenue, close to the foothills of Mount Mtatsminda.

The building complex was constructed as the House of Government of Georgian SSR on the site of the demolished 19th-century Alexander Nevsky Cathedral and adjacent churchyard, with burials of the Georgian cadets killed during the Bolshevik invasion of 1921. It consists of two buildings; the "upper" building was designed by Viktor Kokorin and Giorgi Lezhava and built from 1933 to 1938. The "lower" building, along Rustaveli Avenue, was constructed by the same architects with an input from Vladimer Nasaridze from 1946 to 1953. The two buildings are connected with a courtyard, with staircases and fountains. The design of both buildings heavily uses elements of traditional Georgian architecture. The exterior facing the avenue is dominated by a monumental arcade, with massive eaves and "arch" pediment. The buildings are built of lightweight reinforced concrete, with exterior cladding of tufa rock, granite, and other materials.

Front facade of the Parliament Building during the 2024-2025 Georgian Protests. Taken in May 2025

The complex was severely damaged during the December 1991–January 1992 military coup, during which the beleaguered President Zviad Gamsakhurdia was entrenched in the underground bunker under the government premises. The building was subsequently restored, refurbished, and used as the seat of the Parliament of Georgia from 1997 to 2012, when the legislature moved to the newly constructed edifice in Kutaisi, Georgia's second most important city. In 2014 holding of parliament committee meetings was allowed in the parliament premises of Tbilisi, while the regular sessions continued to be held in Kutaisi. The constitutional amendment passed in 2017 entered into force in December 2018, containing no reference to Kutaisi as the seat of the Parliament, meaning that the Parliament fully returned to the capital in January 2019.
