= Tbilisi Assembly Building =

Clock-towered city hall building on Freedom Square, Tbilisi, Georgia

Tbilisi City Assembly Building
- თბილისის საკრებულოს შენობა
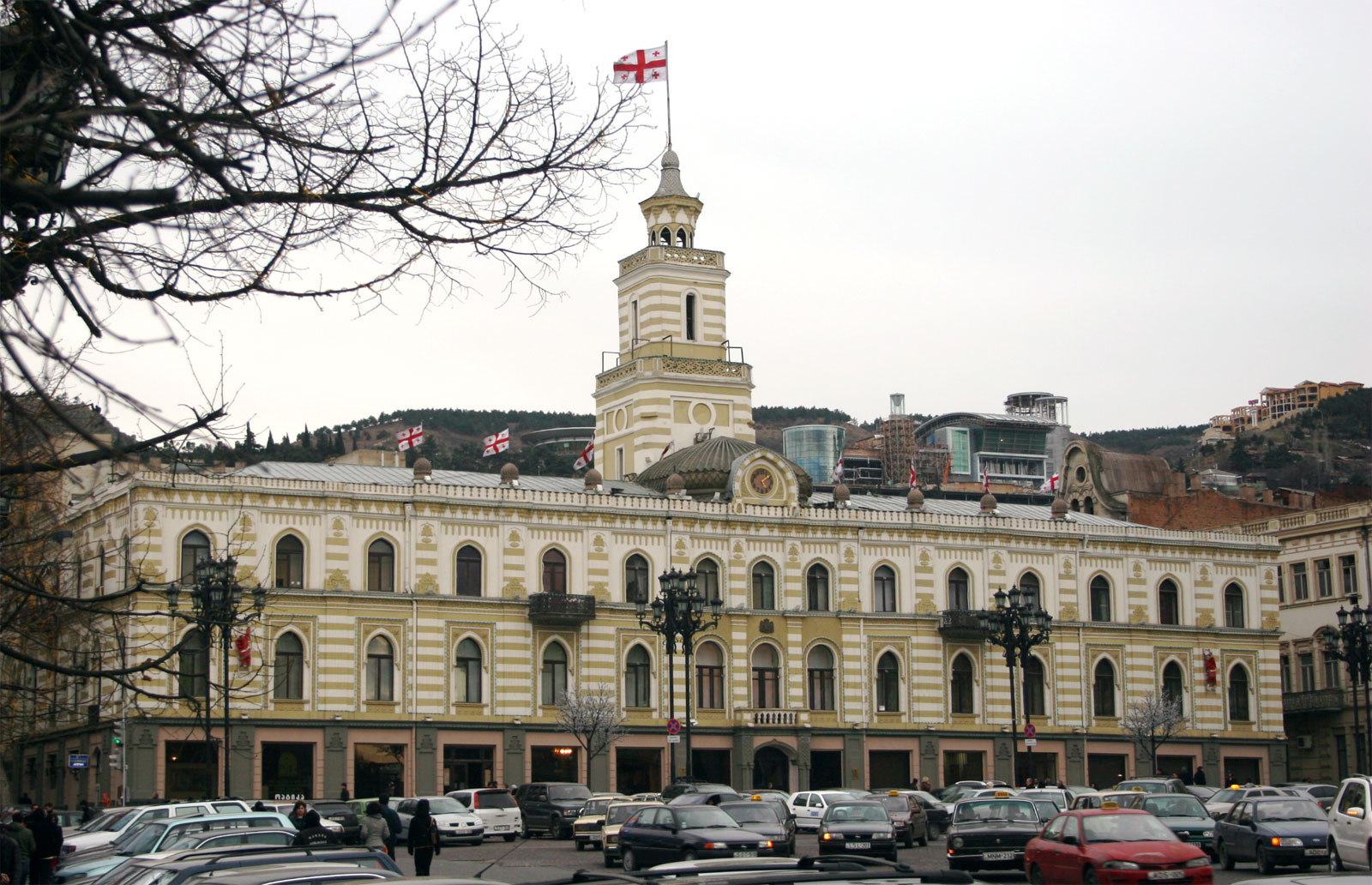
- Interactive map of the Tbilisi City Assembly Building area

General information
- Architectural style: Exotic style with Neo-Moorish design
- Location: Tbilisi, Georgia
- Coordinates: 41.692707°N 44.801541°E
- Current tenants: Tbilisi City Assembly
- Construction started: 1830s
- Completed: 1878; 148 years ago
- Owner: Georgian government

Website
- tbilisi.gov.ge

Cultural Heritage Monument of Georgia
- Official name: Tbilisi City Assembly Building (City Hall)
- Designated: October 1, 2007; 18 years ago
- Reference no.: 4392
- Item Number in Cultural Heritage Portal: 3878
- Date of entry in the registry: October 11, 2007; 18 years ago
- Accounting Card / Passport #: 010508007

Tbilisi City Assembly Building (Georgian: თბილისის საკრებულოს შენობა) is a clock-towered edifice situated in the southern side of Freedom Square (in Georgian - tavisuplebis moedani), Tbilisi, capital of Georgia. It houses the City Assembly (sakrebulo).

== History ==
The original building was built under the Imperial Russian rule in the 1830s but was reconstructed several times, taking a different look over the past two centuries. It served, until 1879, as a Chancellery of Chief Policemaster and police department. A competition announced in 1878 for the remodeling the building to the City Hall (Gorodskoy Dom) was won by the architect Paul Stern's project. It exterior architecture reflects the then-popular Exotic style with Neo-Moorish design. A tower was added in 1910 and the building was further enlarged in 1912.
