= Georgian Parliament Building (Kutaisi) =

Public building in Kutaisi, Georgia

- Parliament Building
- Interactive map of the Georgian Parliament Building area

General information
- Location: Irakli Abashidze Street, Kutaisi, Georgia
- Coordinates: 42.264511°N 42.659655°E
- Construction started: 2011
- Inaugurated: 26 May 2012
- Cost: USD 83,000,000
- Client: Kutaisi City Hall
- Owner: Parliament of Georgia

Technical details
- Floor area: 40,000 square metres (430,000 ft^{2})

Design and construction
- Architect: Alberto Domingo Cabo
- Architecture firm: CMD Ingenieros
- Structural engineer: Carlos Lázaro Fernández
- Civil engineer: Juliane Petri, Francisco Palacios Climent
- Other designers: Mamoru Kawaguchi, Kenichi Kawaguchi

Website
- newparliamentgeorgia.com

The Georgian Parliament Building in Kutaisi (Georgian: საქართველოს პარლამენტის შენობა ქუთაისში, romanized: sakartvelos p'arlament'is shenoba kutaisshi) was constructed from 2011 to 2012 in Kutaisi, traditionally the second most important city of Georgia, 231 kilometres (144 mi) west of Tbilisi, the nation's capital, to house the Parliament of Georgia. Built by the Spanish architecture firm CMD Ingenieros, the building was inaugurated on 26 May 2012 and, according to the respective constitutional clause, became the main seat of the newly elected Parliament in October 2012 until the legislature moved back to Tbilisi in January 2019.

The exterior of the building is dominated by a 100-metre (330 ft) by 150-metre (490 ft) oval-shaped great glass and steel dome ploughed by a roof-like concrete element that rests on the vault. It was constructed on the initiative of then-President of Georgia Mikheil Saakashvili on the site of the Glory Memorial to Soviet soldiers of World War II; the monument was demolished with explosives to free space for the construction in December 2009, accidentally killing two people, a mother and a daughter. The government, during the building's construction, promoted it as a symbol of Georgia's bright, democratic future. Its location in Kutaisi was touted as a boost for the regional economy there as well as a way to knit the country closer together. Critics state that the building is a waste of money, and that having Parliament in Kutaisi, while the rest of the government remains in Tbilisi, is inefficient. Saakashvili argued that the relocation would attract development to Kutaisi and provide security for the parliament in case of an invasion, as Tbilisi is closer to Russian-controlled areas.

After Saakashvili's term in office expired, the new government of the Georgian Dream coalition decided to move all parliamentary activities back to Tbilisi. The constitutional amendment passed in 2017 entered into force in December 2018, containing no reference to Kutaisi as the seat of the Parliament, meaning that the Parliament fully returned to the capital in January 2019. The building in Kutaisi is set to pass into possession of the Ministry of Internal Affairs of Georgia. In 2021, Radio Free Europe/Radio Liberty reported that the building was under the control of the Ministry of Economics and still abandoned, although the preserved horseman statue from the former Soviet war memorial had been erected on a new base near the building. Prime Minister Irakli Garibashvili announced in a government meeting in December 2022 that an information technology hub is planned to be established in the building.
