= Architecture of Georgia =

The architecture of Georgia refers to the styles of architecture found in Georgia. The country is exceptionally rich in architectural monuments. Characteristic features of the Georgian architecture are monumentality, clear composition, strict proportions, moderate use of decorations, and above all these the harmonic interaction with nature.

Georgian architecture is influenced by a number of architectural styles, including several each for castles, towers, fortifications, palaces and churches. The Upper Svaneti fortifications and the castle town of Shatili in Khevsureti are among the finest examples of medieval Georgian castles.

Georgian medieval churches have a distinct character, though related to Armenian and Byzantine architecture, typically combining a conical dome raised high on a drum over a rectangular or cross-shaped lower structure. Often known as the "Georgian cross-dome style," this style of architecture developed in Georgia during the 9th century; before then, most Georgian churches were basilicas. Examples of the influence of Georgian ecclesiastic architecture can be found overseas in Bulgaria (Bachkovo Monastery built in 1083 by Georgian military commander Grigorii Bakuriani), in Greece (Iviron monastery built by Georgians in the 10th century) and in Jerusalem (Monastery of the Cross built by Georgians in the 9th century).

Other architectural styles in Georgia include the Hausmannized Rustaveli Avenue in Tbilisi and that city's Old Town District.

== Middle ages ==
The history of construction in Georgia can be traced back to the 5th-4th millennia BC, from Paleolithic to the Late Medieval times. The oldest structures were made of stone and wood, and later of bricks.

=== 7th century ===
This was the period of considerable rethinking of internal space in church design. The space was increased by introduction of pillars that now held the tholobate, which gave possibility to experiment with the walls and improved esthetic perception of the interior. Traditional triangular niches by the sides of the apse also appear in this century. First such example, which actually started new traditions, was Tsromi church.

=== 10th century ===
The first hints of the emerging 11-13th century architecture appear in this period in Kumurdo Cathedral.

=== 11th century ===
From the beginning of the century Georgian architecture becomes exceptionally artistic and decorative. Facades acquire rich relief ornamentation and arcading. Predominant ornamental motifs are inspired from nature – flowers, birds, wild and domestic mammals and people. Characteristic for eastern façade axial two rombs with ornamented window and cross above, first appeared in Samtavisi, was later used up until the 13th century. Many earlier built churches, like Svetitskhoveli and Manglisi cathedrals, were substantially rebuilt and decorated in the 11th century.

Major step in the general design was introduction of the cross-in-square plan.

Examples of that period: Samtavisi Cathedral, Samtavro church.

=== 12th century ===
Following the traditions established in the 11th century, the accent was put on increased illumination of interiors in order to better observe frescos. This reflected in creating more windows in dome and side walls.

Examples: Ikorta church.

=== 13th century ===
Bell towers near the churches start to be constructed from the middle of the century.

Invasion of Khwarezmians and Mongols, and strong earthquake of 1283 brought significant destructions. Meanwhile, the end of the 13th century is notable for large scale construction of monasteries; particularly in provinces less effected by invasions, like Samtskhe. Its rulers of the Jakeli family succeeded in building one of the best in that period and still largely preserved St. Saba's Church, part of Sapara Monastery. Following generally the Golden Age traditions, churches of that period are characterised by more simplified and less expressive decorations. Facade architecture disappears, and decorations are made on smooth surfaces. Previously convex window decorations become immersed into the wall. Cladding is characteristically polychromatic. The dome looks heavier than in previous centuries, and its tholobate typically has twelve windows, although starting from St. Saba's Church, the number increases to sixteen - eight true and eight false windows.

=== 14th century ===
The decline, which began in the previous century due to Mongol dominance, continued to reflect in the architecture of the 14th century. The church dome tholobate becomes more stumpy. The facade decorations remaining only around the doors and windows. The examples include Gergeti Trinity Church, Zarzma and Chulevi monastery.

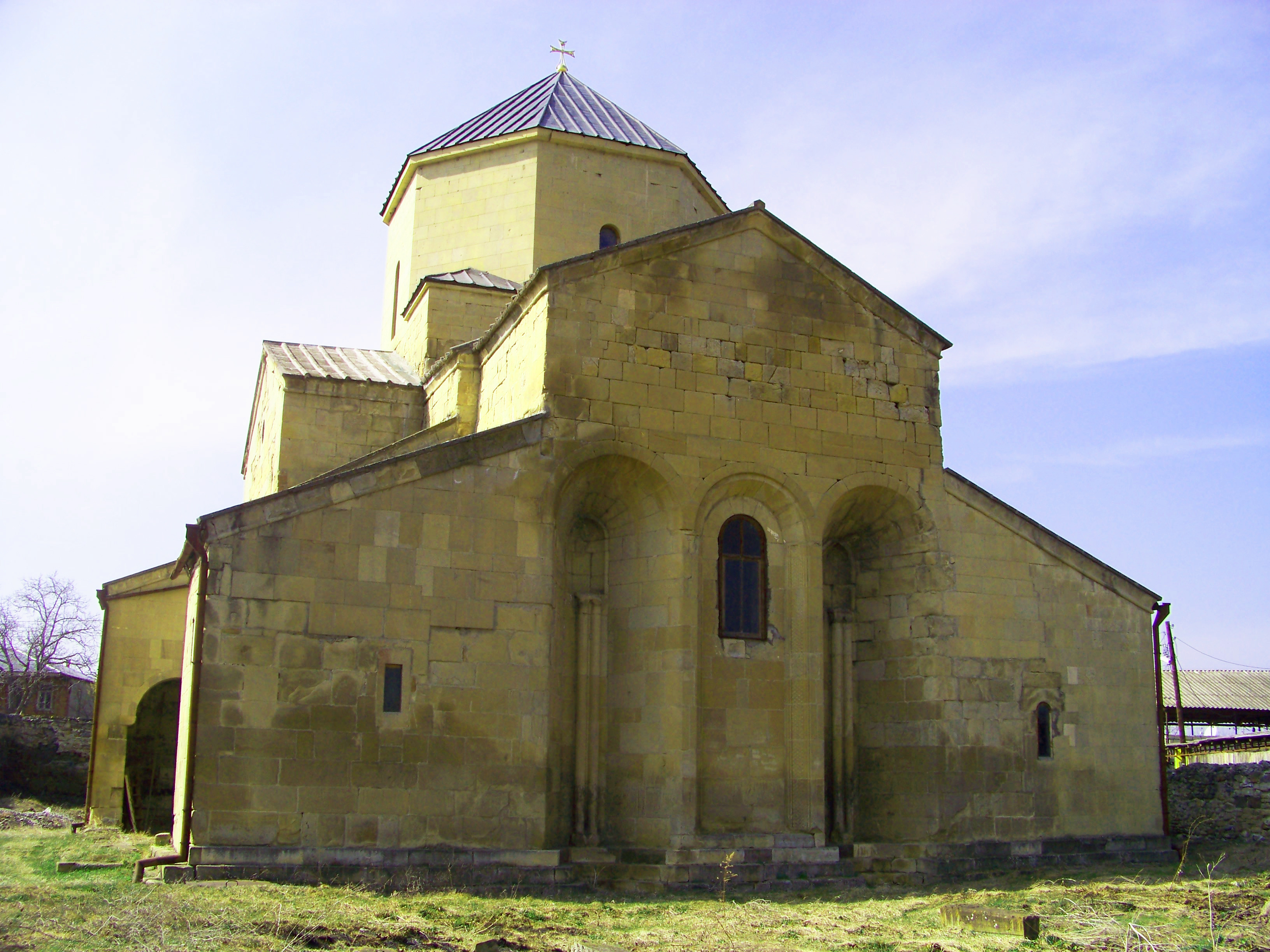
Tsromi church (7th century)

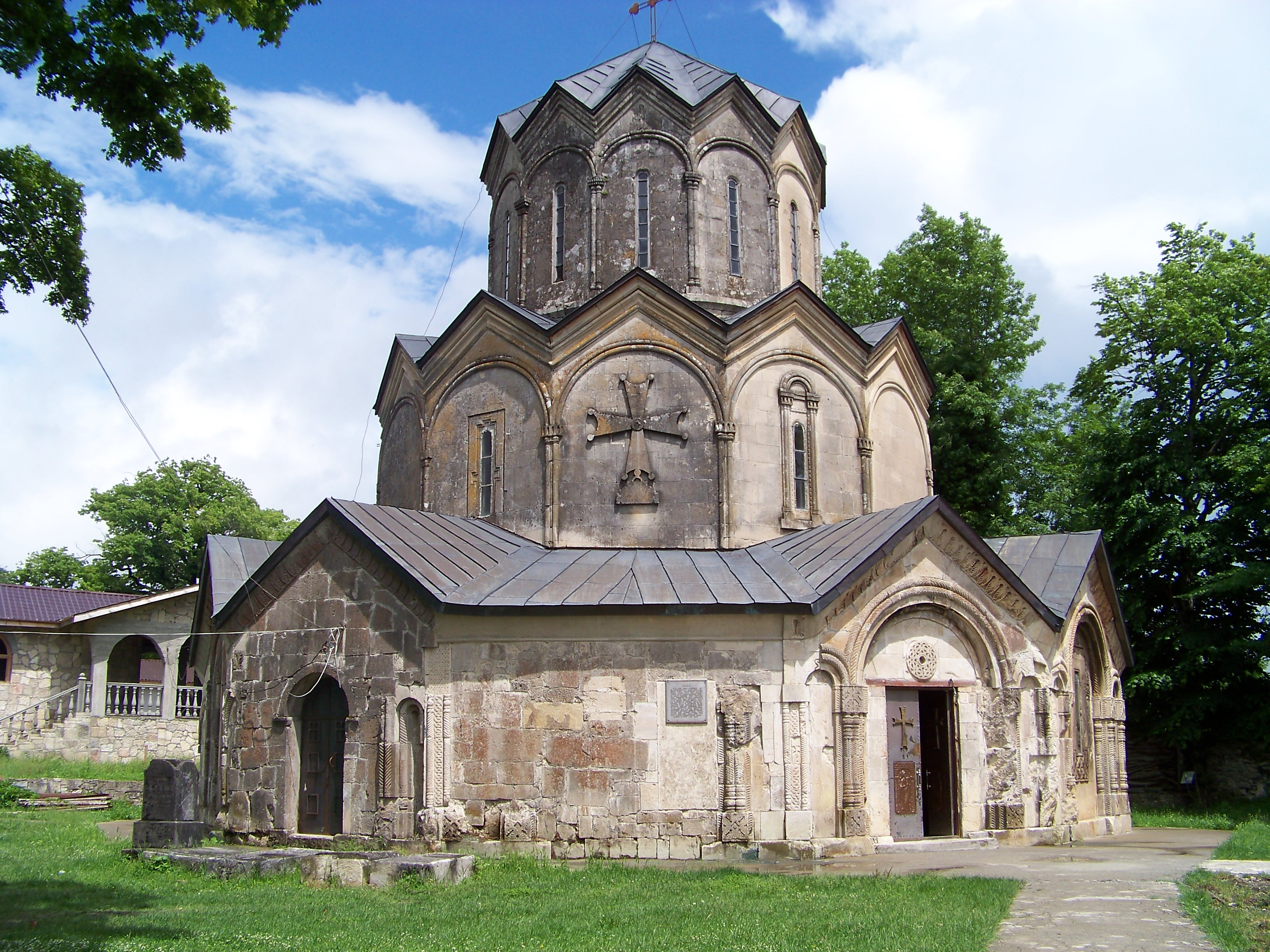
Katskhi Monastery (10th century)

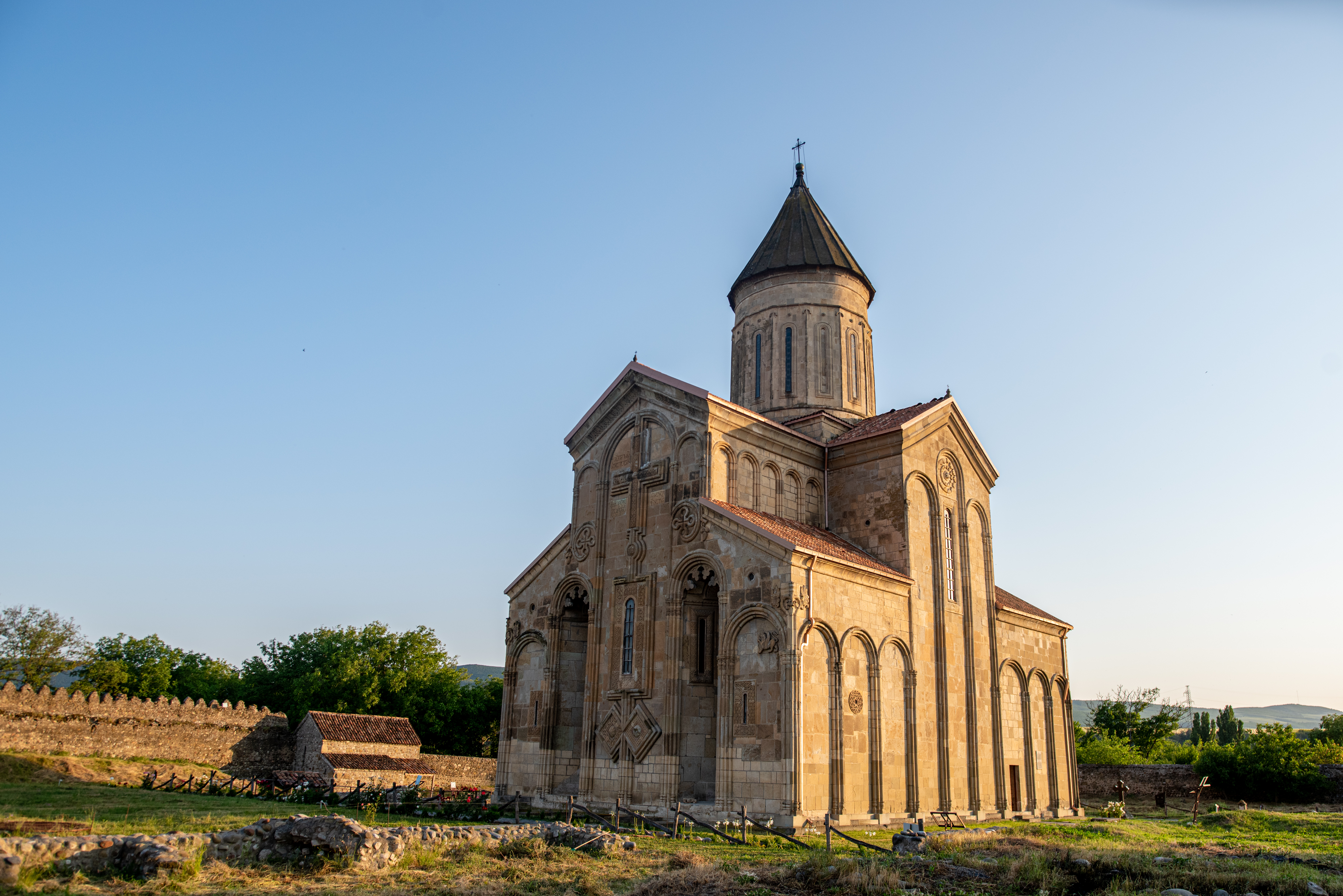
Samtavisi Cathedral (11th century)

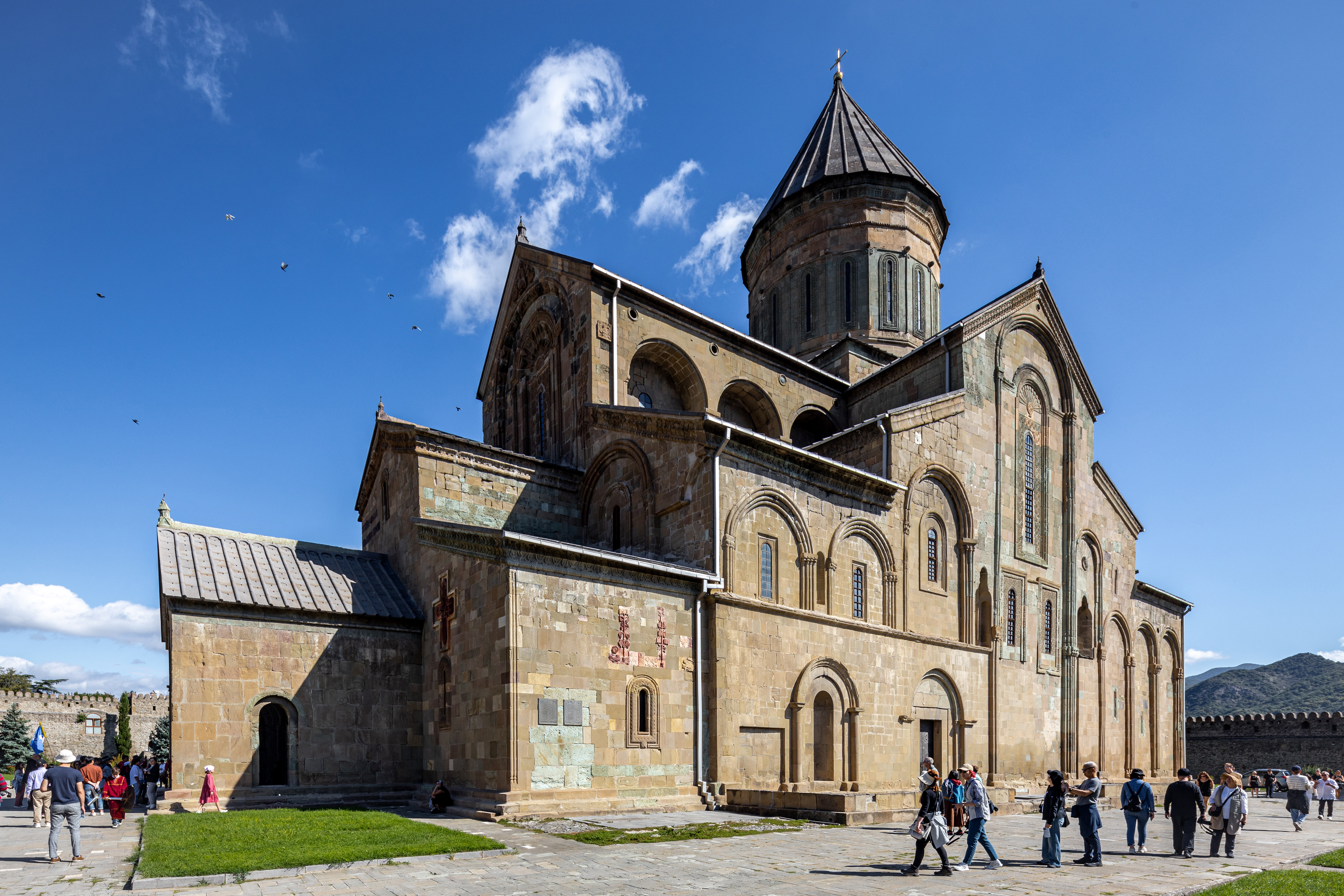
Svetitskhoveli Cathedral (11th century)

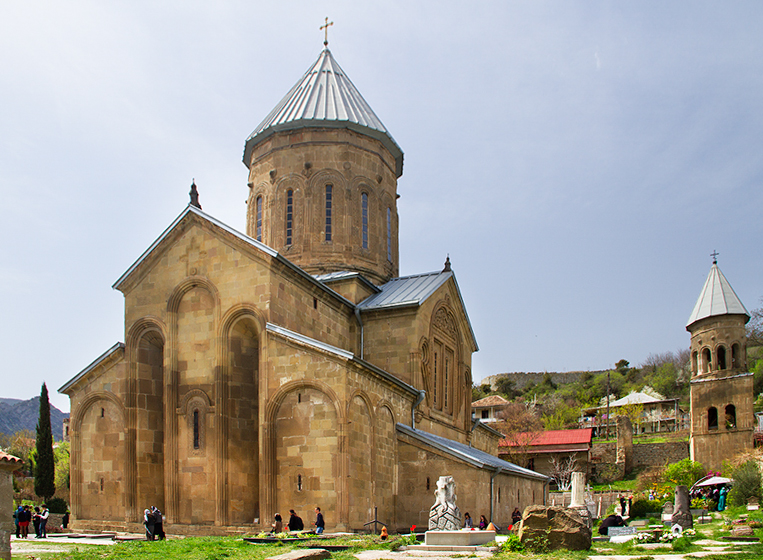
Samtavro Monastery (11th century)

Ikorta church (12th century)

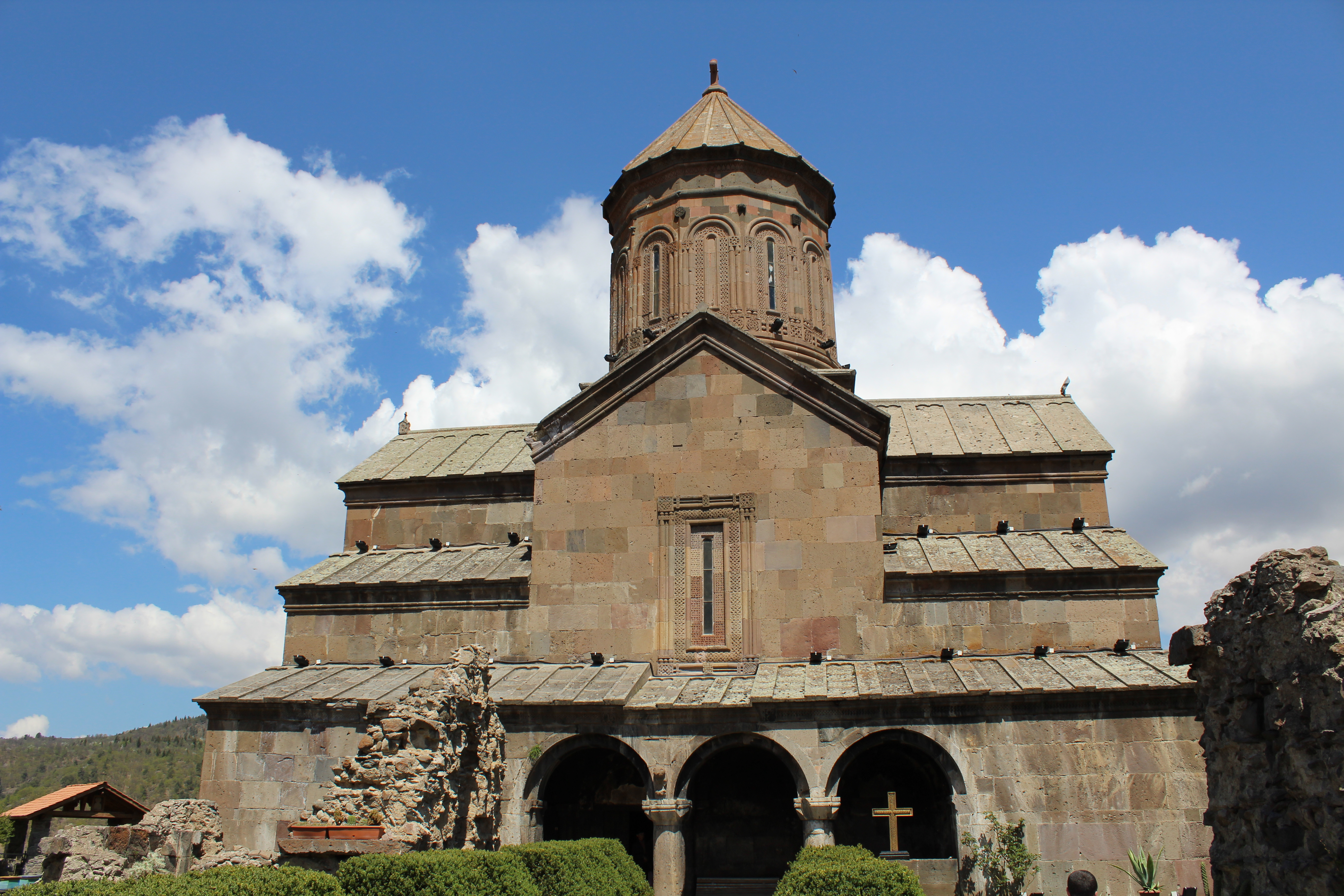
Zarzma Monastery (14th century)

== 19th century ==
In the 19th century, historicism became popular in Georgia. Among the most notable examples are the neo-Gothic Dadiani Palace in Zugdidi (1840), the Moorish Revival Georgian National Opera Theater in Tbilisi (1847–1851, 1896) as well as the Neo-Byzantine Alexander Nevsky Cathedral in Tbilisi (1871–1897, demolished by the Soviet authorities in 1930) and the cathedral in Poti (1906–07).

Dadiani Palace (1840)

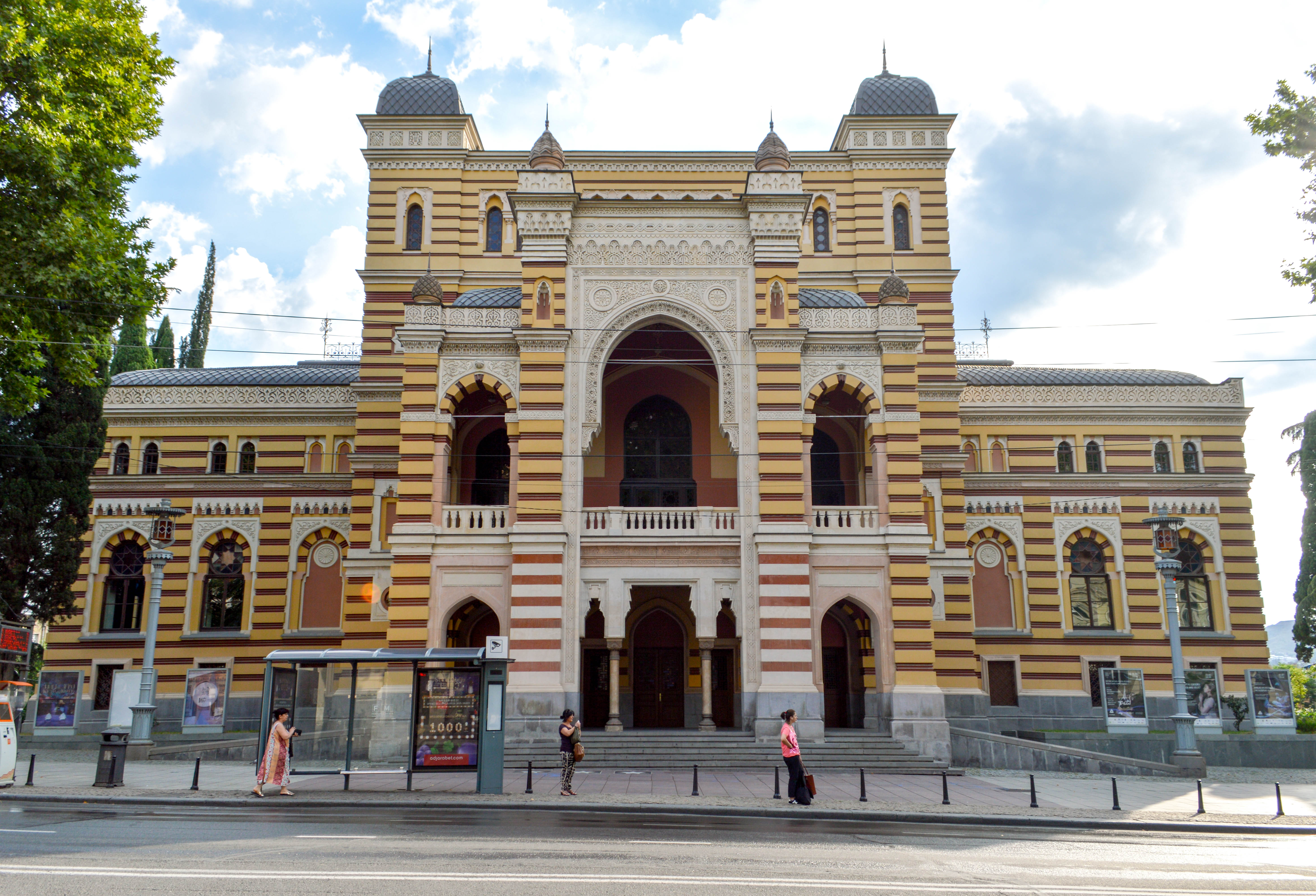
Georgian National Opera Theater in Tbilisi by Antonio Scudieri and Viktor Schröter (1847–1851, 1896)

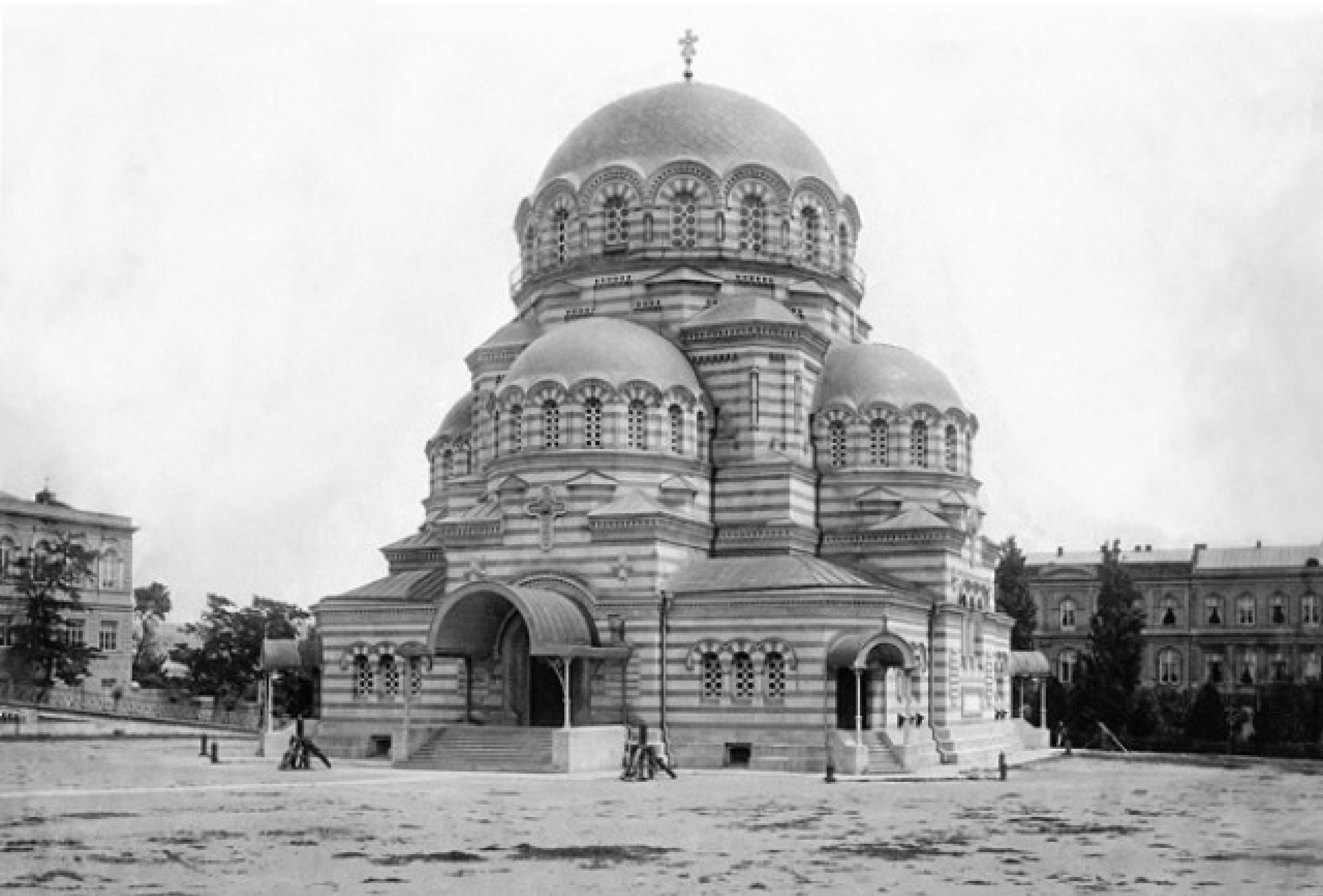
Alexander Nevsky Military Cathedral in Tbilisi by David Grimm (1871–1897, demolished by the Soviet authorities in 1930)

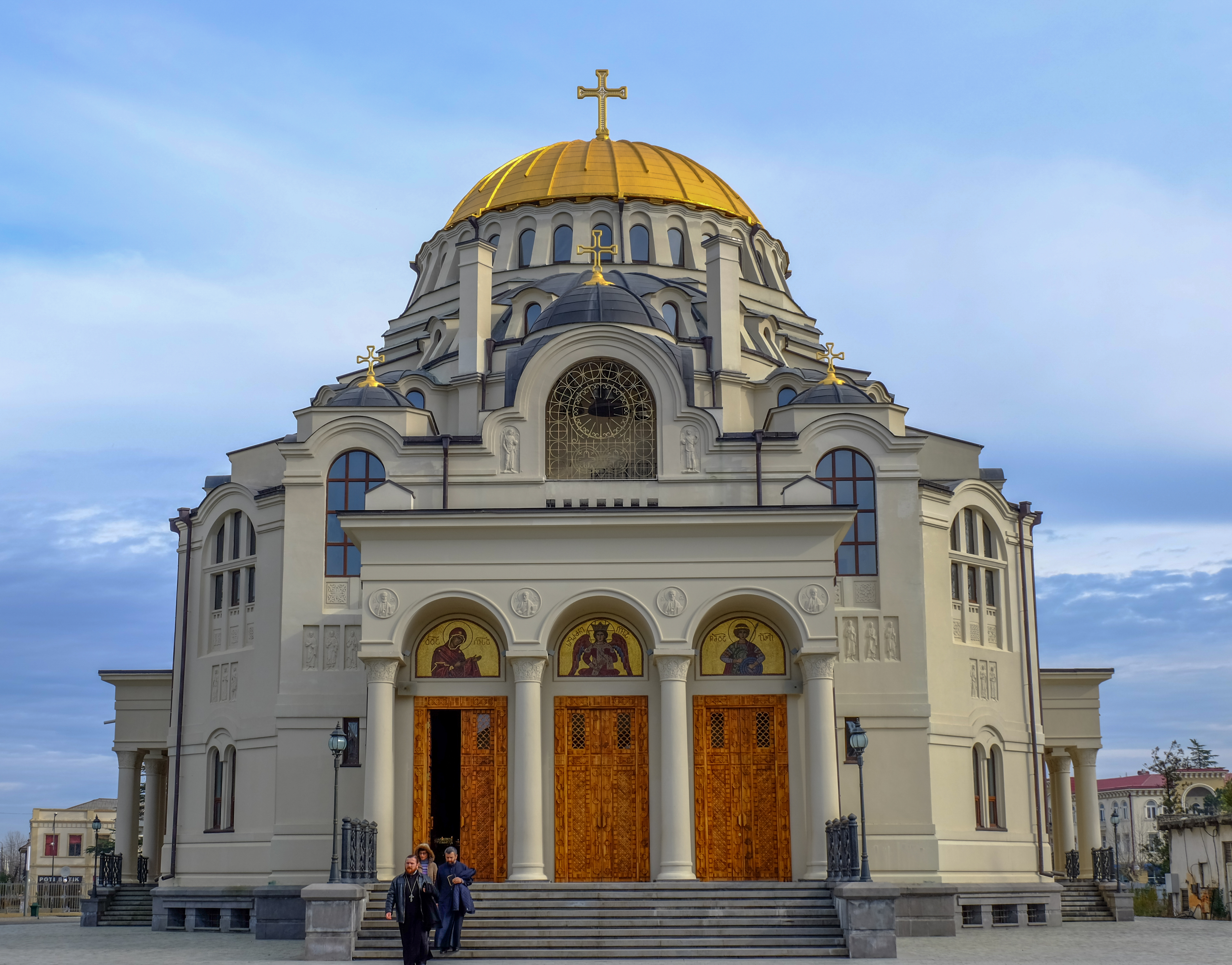
Poti Cathedral by Alexander Zelenko and Robert Marfeld (1906–07)

== Georgian Soviet Socialist Republic ==
At the beginning of the Soviet era, from the 1930s to the 1950s, Socialist Realism predominated, though it drew on local Georgian architecture. Key examples of the architecture of this period include IMELI Building (1934–38) and the Georgian Parliament Building in Tbilisi (1933–53). In the later period, Brutalism gained popularity. The most important examples from this period in Tbilisi include the Isani metro station (1971), the Bank of Georgia headquarters (1972–78), the Technical Library (1985), and the housing estate on Nutsubidze Street (1974–76). In the 1980s, the first postmodernist trends emerged, such as the Wedding Palace (1980–85) and the so-called Andropov’s Ears (1983, demolished in 2005) in Tbilisi.

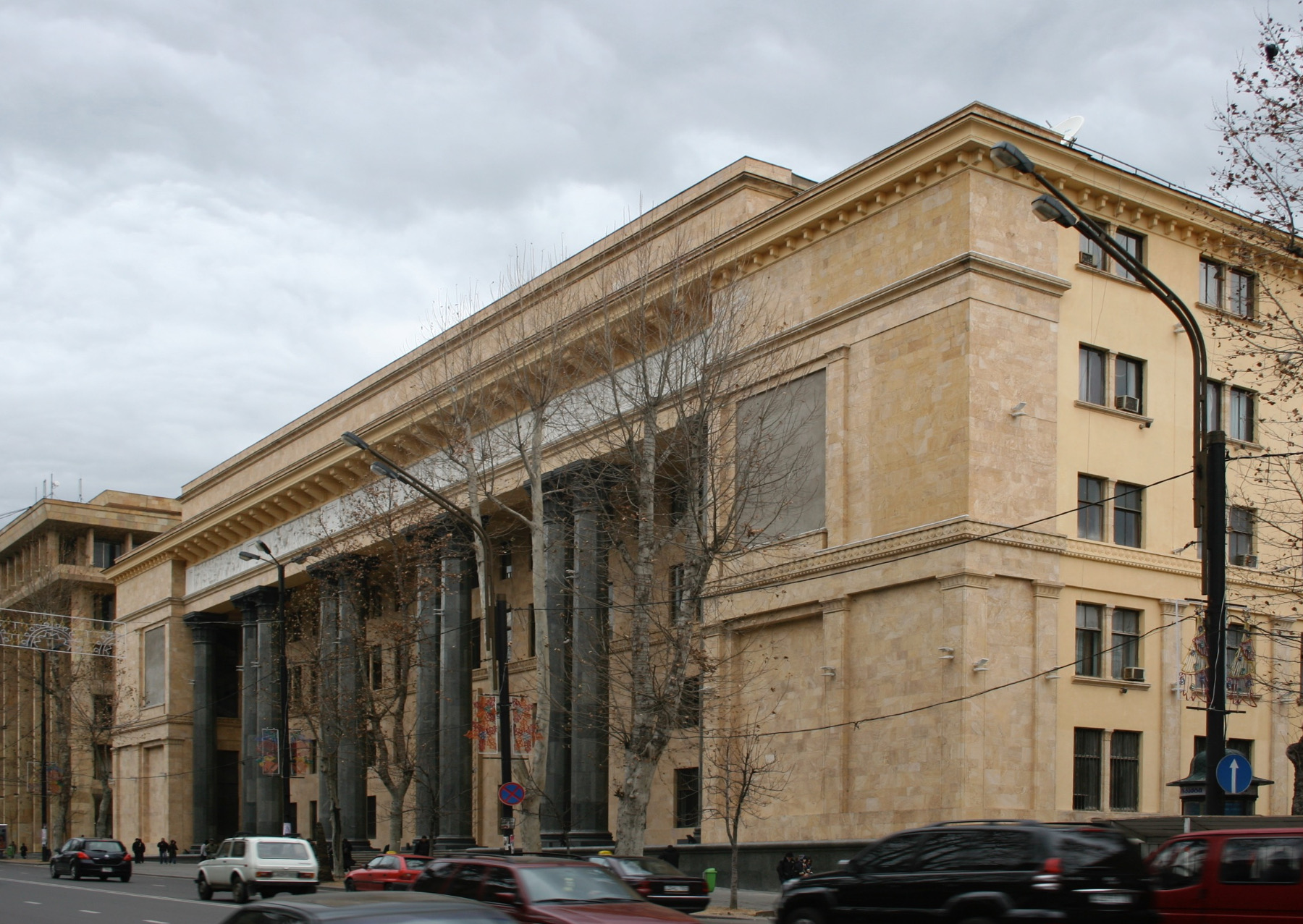
IMELI Building in Tbilisi by Alexey Shchusev (1934–38)

Georgian Parliament Building in Tbilisi by Viktor Kokorin, Giorgi Lezhava and Vladimer Nasaridze (1933–53)

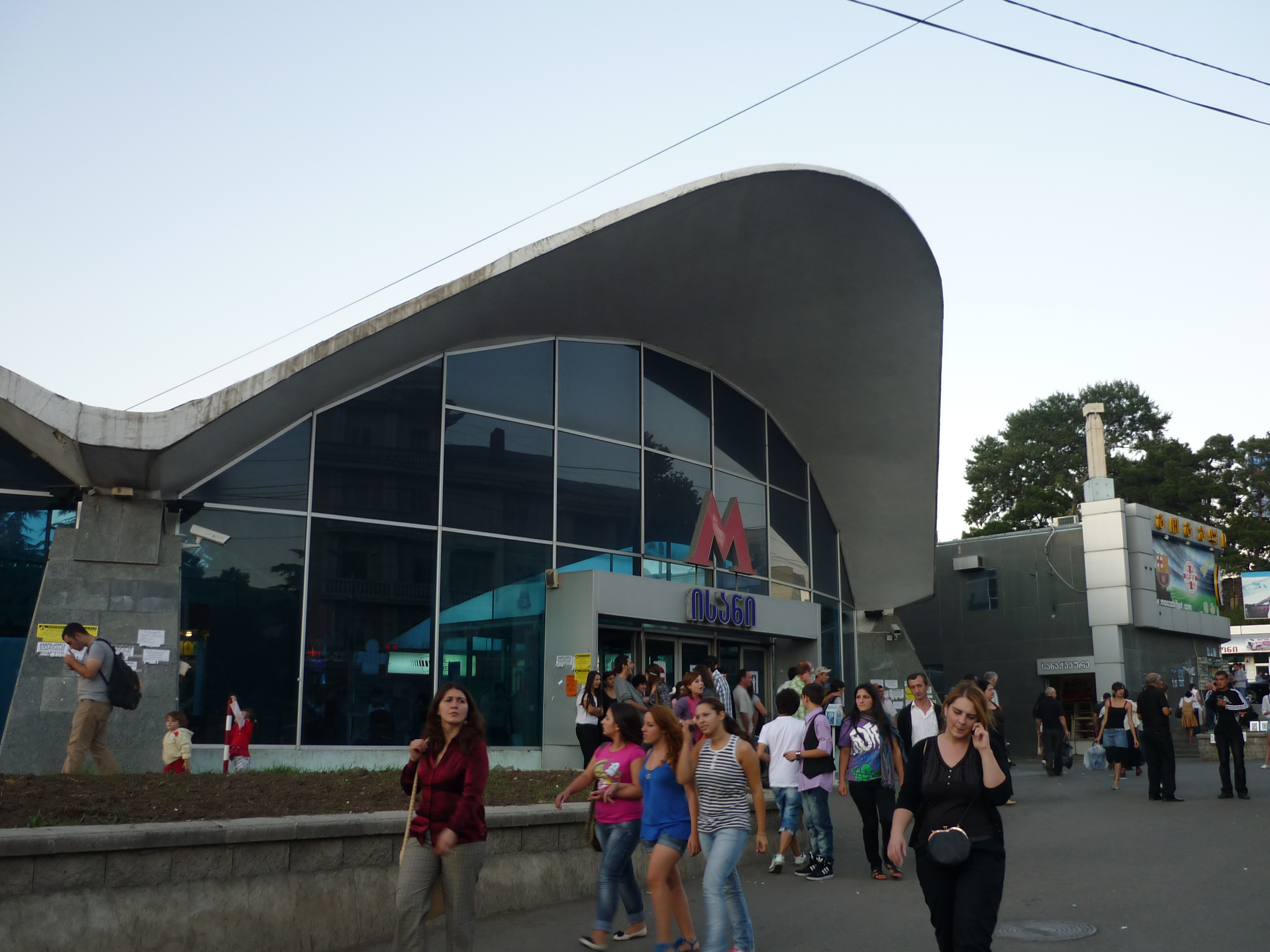
Isani metro station in Tbilisi by G. Modzmanashvili and N. Lomsadze (1971)

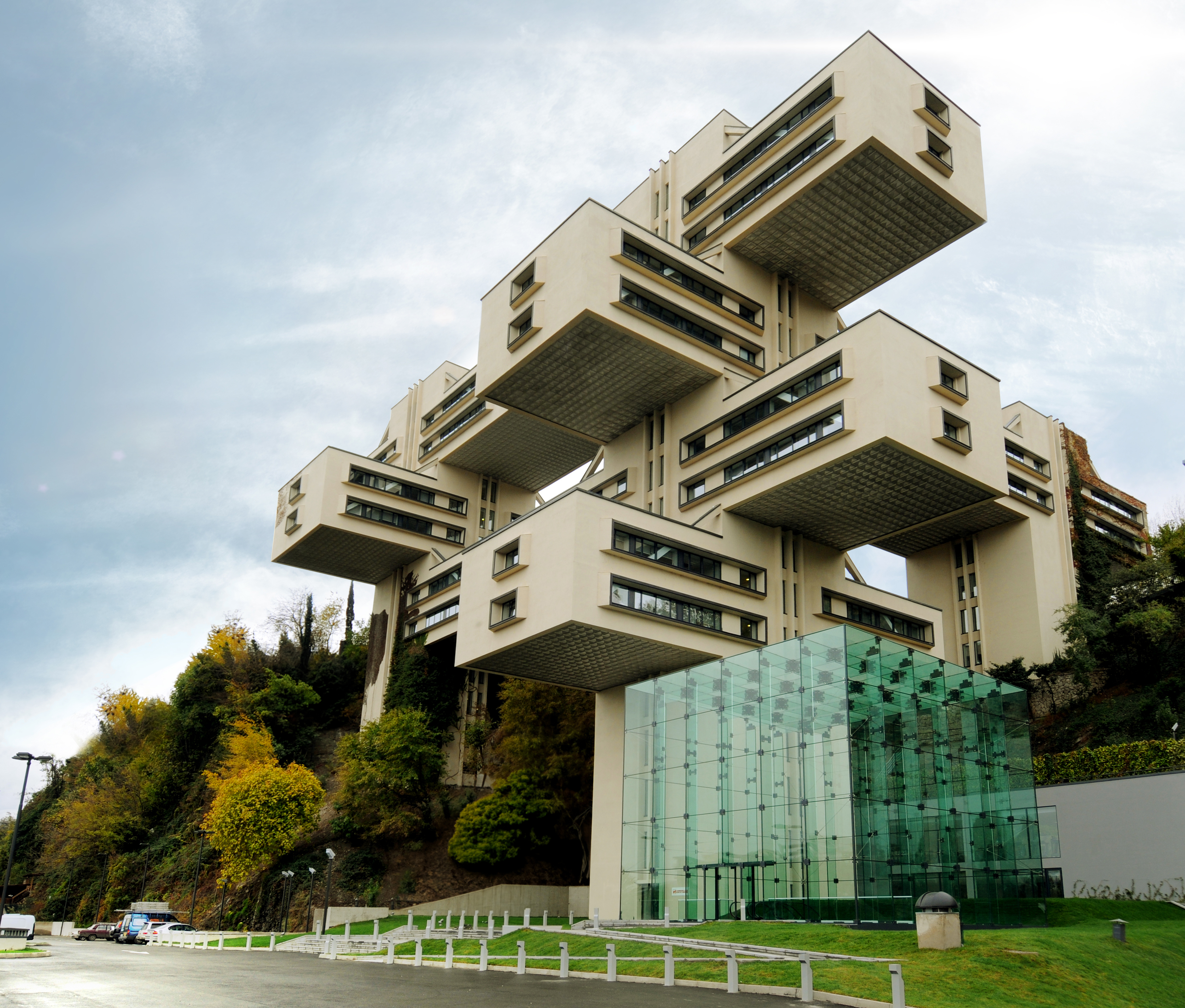
Bank of Georgia headquarters by George Chakhava, Zurab Jalaghania and Teimuraz Skhilava (1972–78)

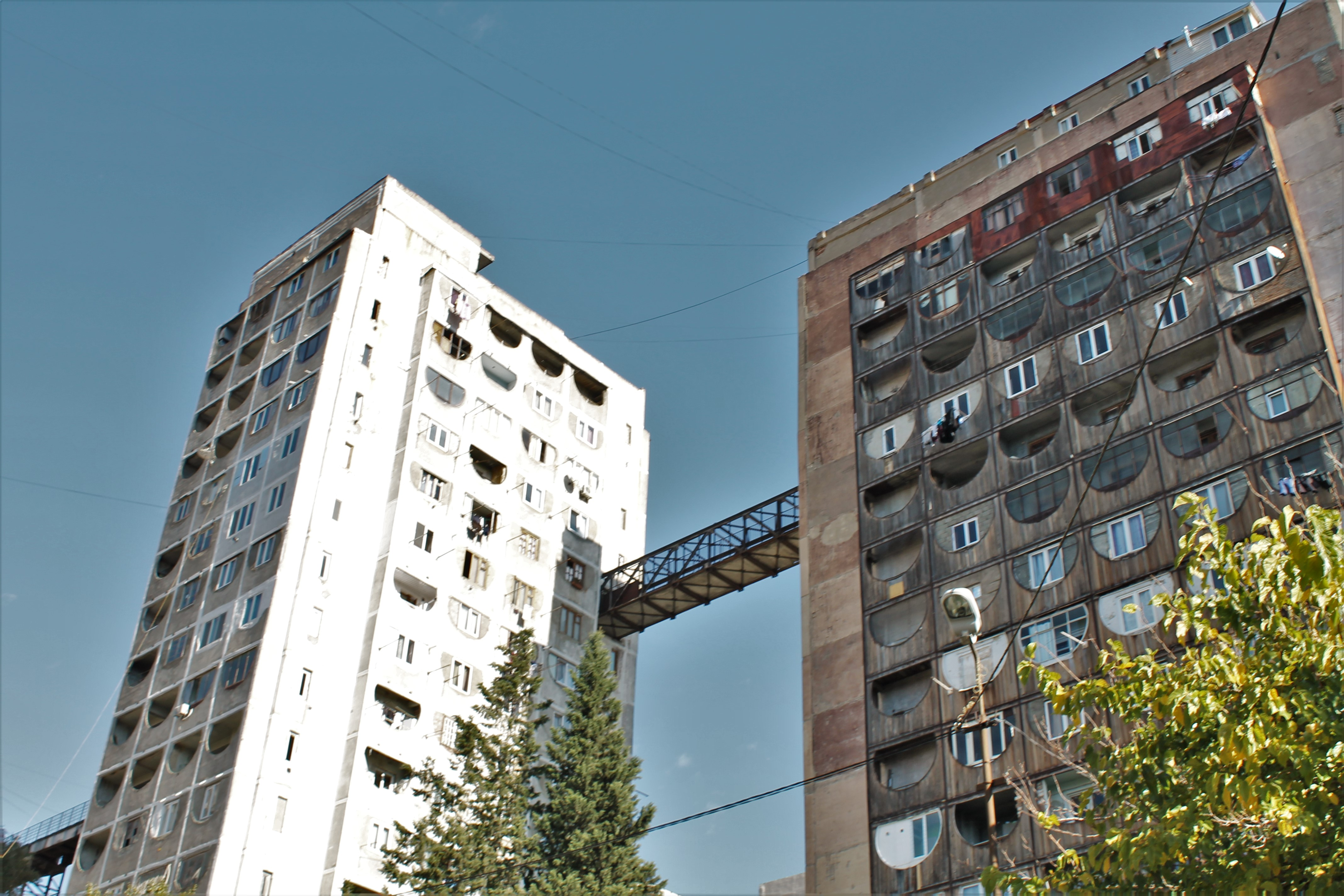
Nutsubidze Street housung estate in Tbilisi by Otar Kalandarishvili and Gizo Potskhishvili (1974–76)

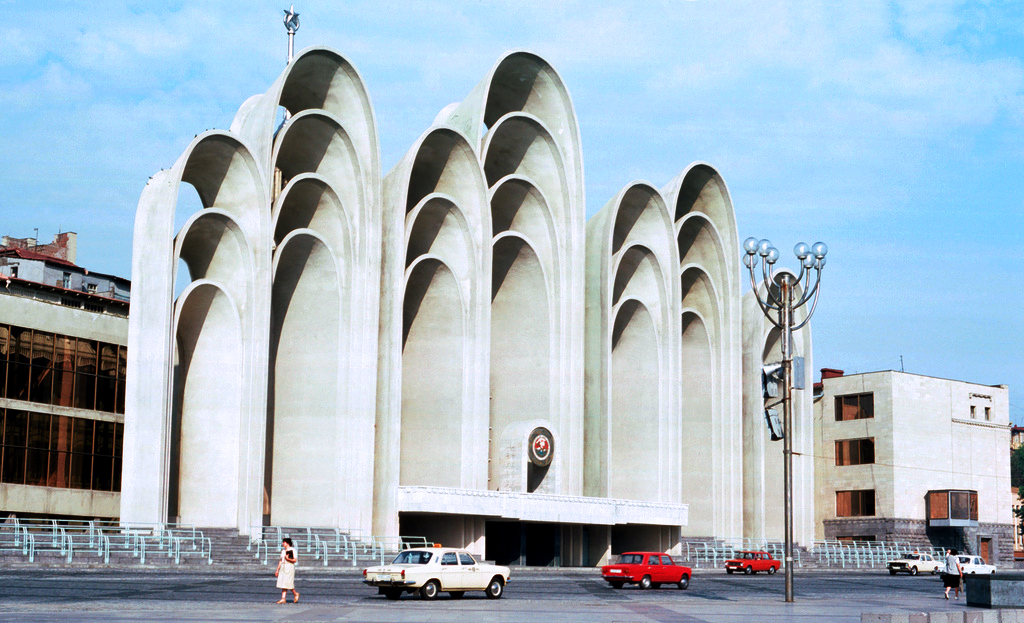
Andropov’s Ears in Tbilisi by Otar Kalandarishvili and Gizo Potskhishvili (1983, demolished in 2005)

Wedding Palace in Tbilisi by Victor Djorbenadze and Vazha Orbeladze (1980–85)

== Contemporary architecture ==
Following Georgia’s independence in 1991, internationally renowned architects such as Michele De Lucchi (Bridge of Peace in Tbilisi and the Public Service Hall in Batumi), Jürgen Mayer (Sarpi border checkpoint) and Massimiliano Fuksas (Tbilisi Public Service Hall and Music Theatre and Exhibition Hall in Tbilisi). Modern church architecture is reprsented by the Holy Trinity Cathedral in Tbilisi.

Bridge of Peace in Tbilisi by Michele De Lucchi (2009–10)

Public Service Hall in Batumi (2010–11)

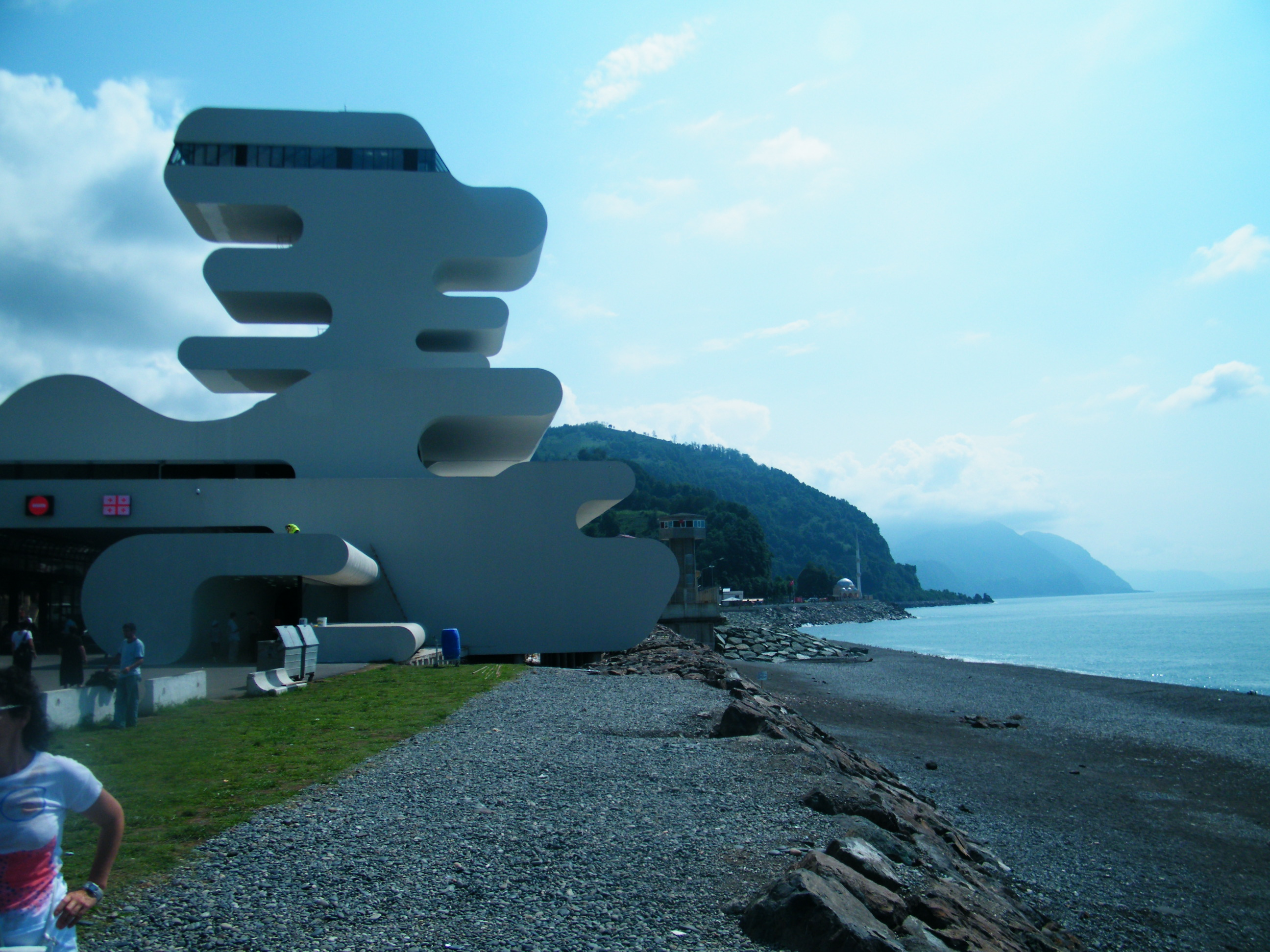
Sarpi border checkpoint by Jürgen Mayer (2010–11)

Tbilisi Public Service Hall by Massimiliano Fuksas (2010–12)

Music Theatre and Exhibition Hall in Tbilisi by Massimiliano Fuksas (2010–16)

Holy Trinity Cathedral of Tbilisi (1995–2004)

== See also ==
- Darbazi
