= Ikorta castle =

Historical castle in eastern Georgia

- Location: Lower Ikorta, Shida Kartli, Georgia
- Coordinates: 42°09′59″N 44°09′21″E
- Type: ruins
- Beginning date: 17th century
- Completion date: 18th century

Ikorta castle is a historical castle of Ksani dukes (eristavs) in eastern Georgia, near the city of Gori in the village of Kvemo-Ikorta (Lower Ikorta) on the bank of river Artseula. The current remnants of the castle are Ikorta church and the citadel. Presumably dating to the 17th-18th centuries, the exact time of its construction is not known. The castle was built most probably when Ksani eristavs moved from Kvenipnevi to Akhalgori and obtained Ikorta as one of their residences. The Ikorta church served as the burial place for eristavs, and currently numerous gravestones can be found inside and around it.

== History ==
The exact construction time is not known, and presumable dates to the 17th-18th century, when Ksani eristavs lead the rebellion against Iran. In 1732 Kartli was fighting against lezgins, who were completely defeated under the walls of Ikorta castle. In 1736 Iranian troops of Nader shah were defeated by Ksani eristav Shanshe by the castle.

== Architecture ==
The castle consisted of two parts, the lower and the upper. The vast lower part contained the Ikorta church and probably the dukes' palace, and only fragmentary traces of the wall can be found scattered around, as well as a tower in the southeastern part. The upper citadel has a roughly rectangular shape, with two towers: one quadrangular and another circular. The quadrangular tower, in the northwestern part of the fortress, was built earlier than the circular tower, in the southwest. Only three stories remain in the quadrangular tower. It was made of stones. The entrance was from the south. Single and doubled arrowslits still can be seen on its walls. The circular tower was originally smaller than the current, which was restored in 18th century. The more preserved western wall is 4-5 m high, but its upper part was ruined. The eastern wall was connected to the lower fortress by wooden stairs.

== See also ==
- Ikorta church
