= Poti =

Poti ფოთი
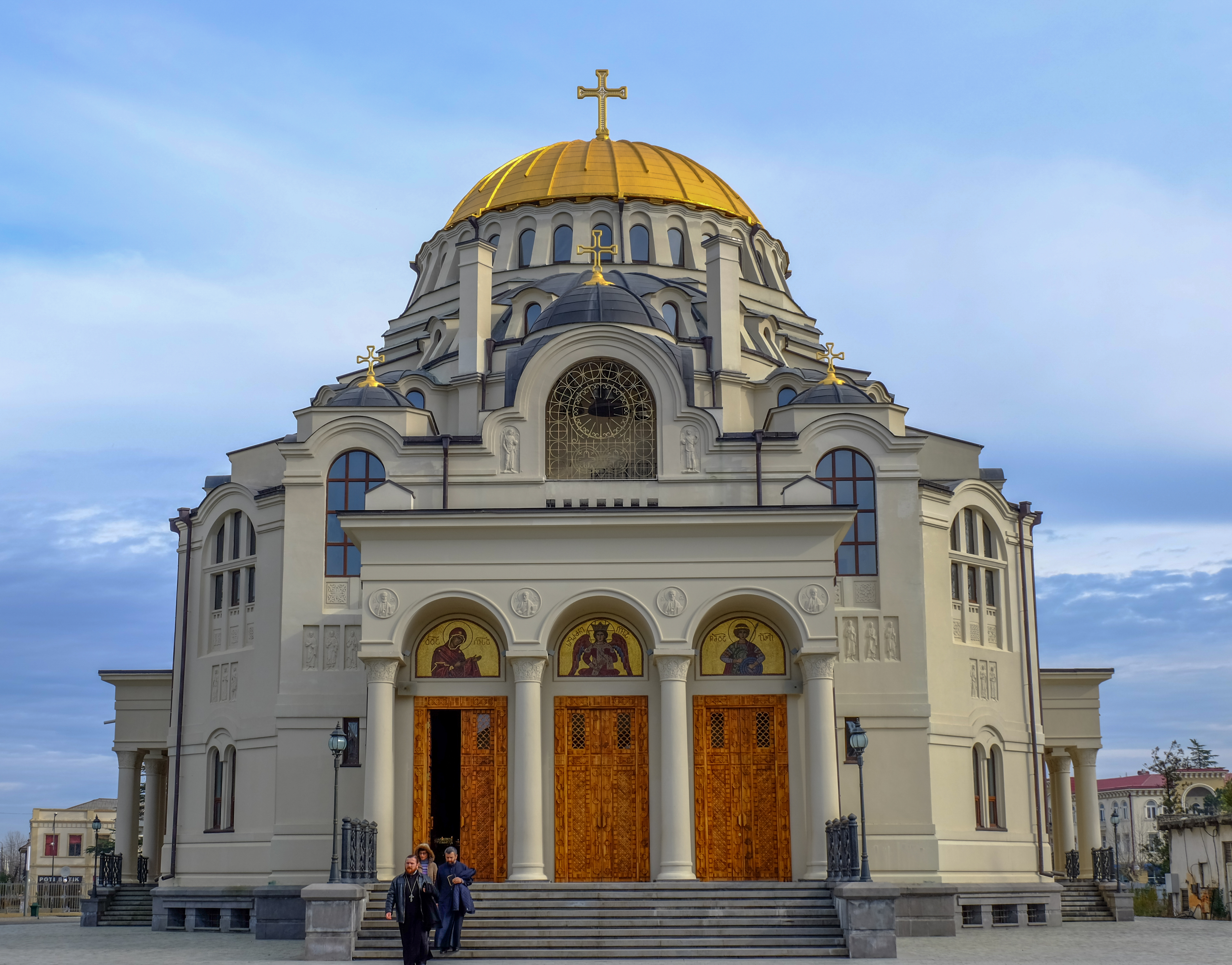
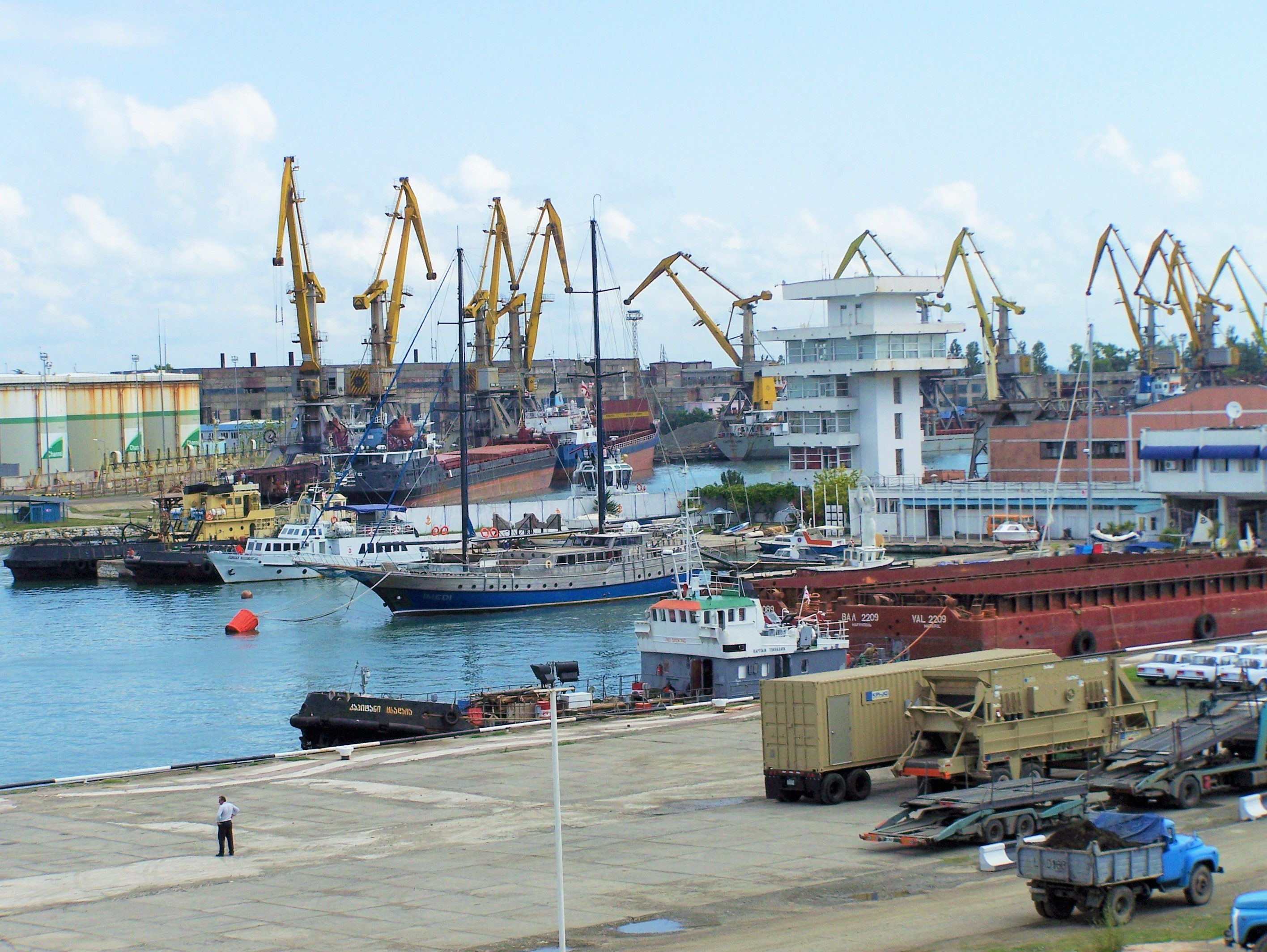
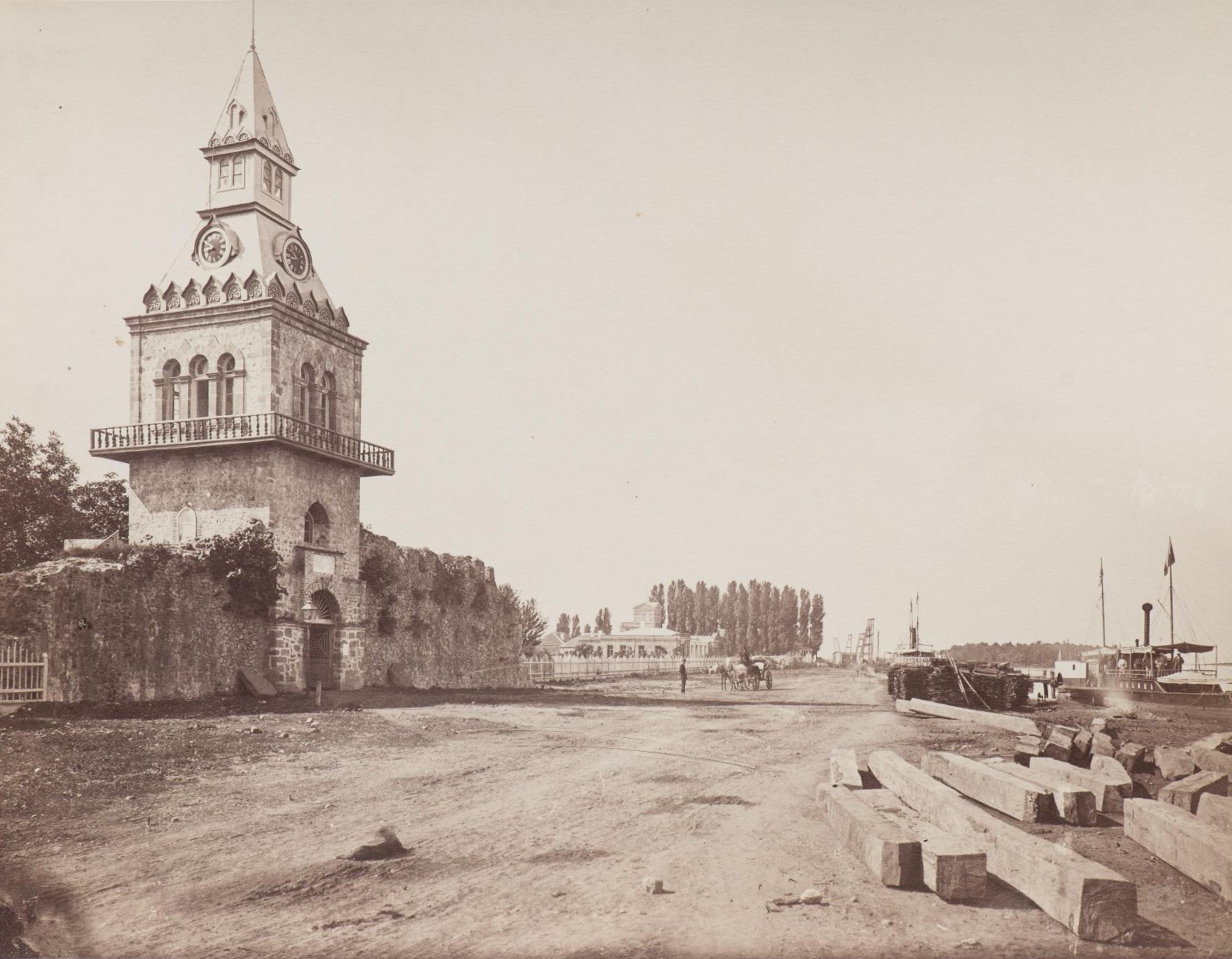
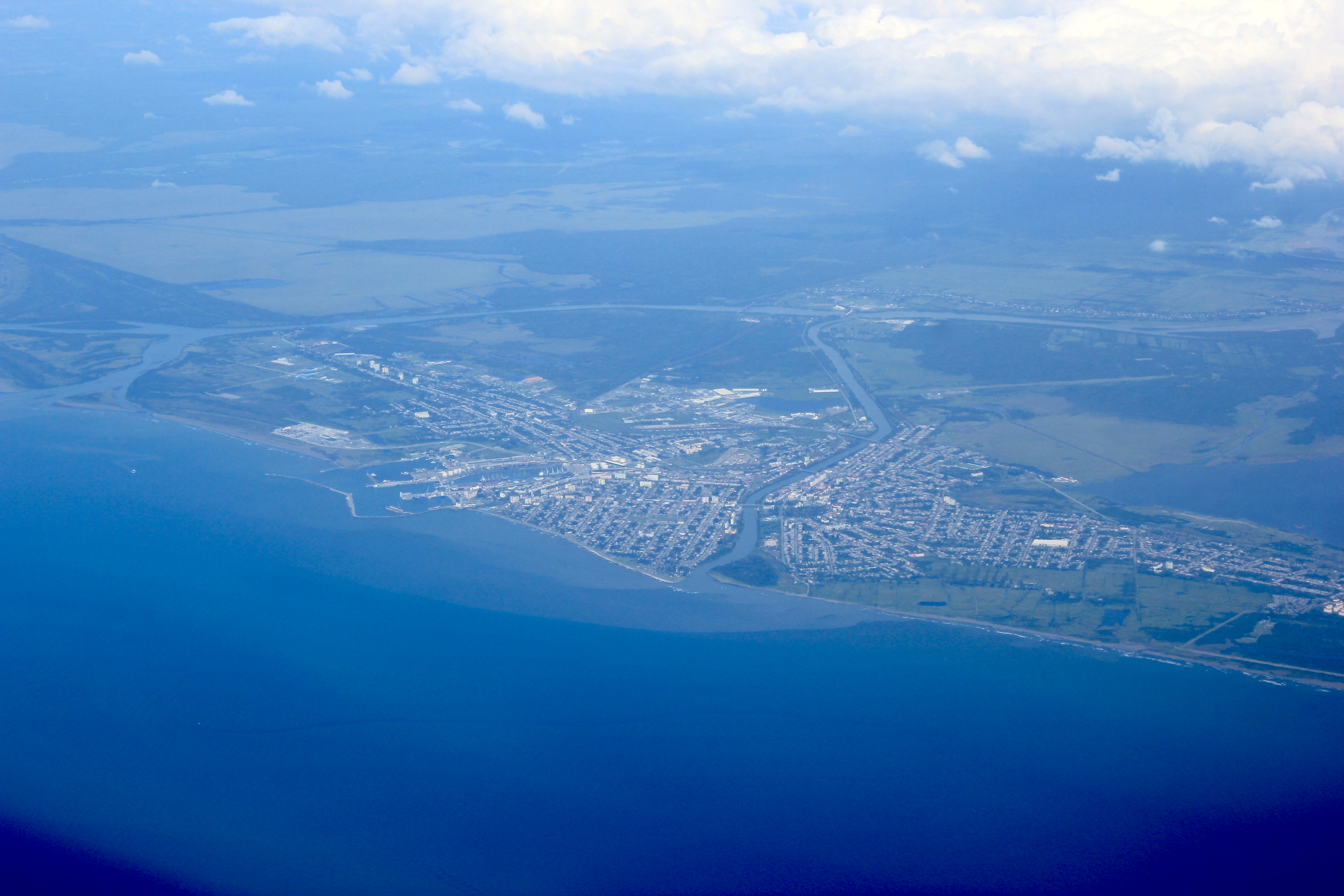
- Poti Cathedral Poti Sea Port Niko Nikoladze Tower Aerial view of Poti

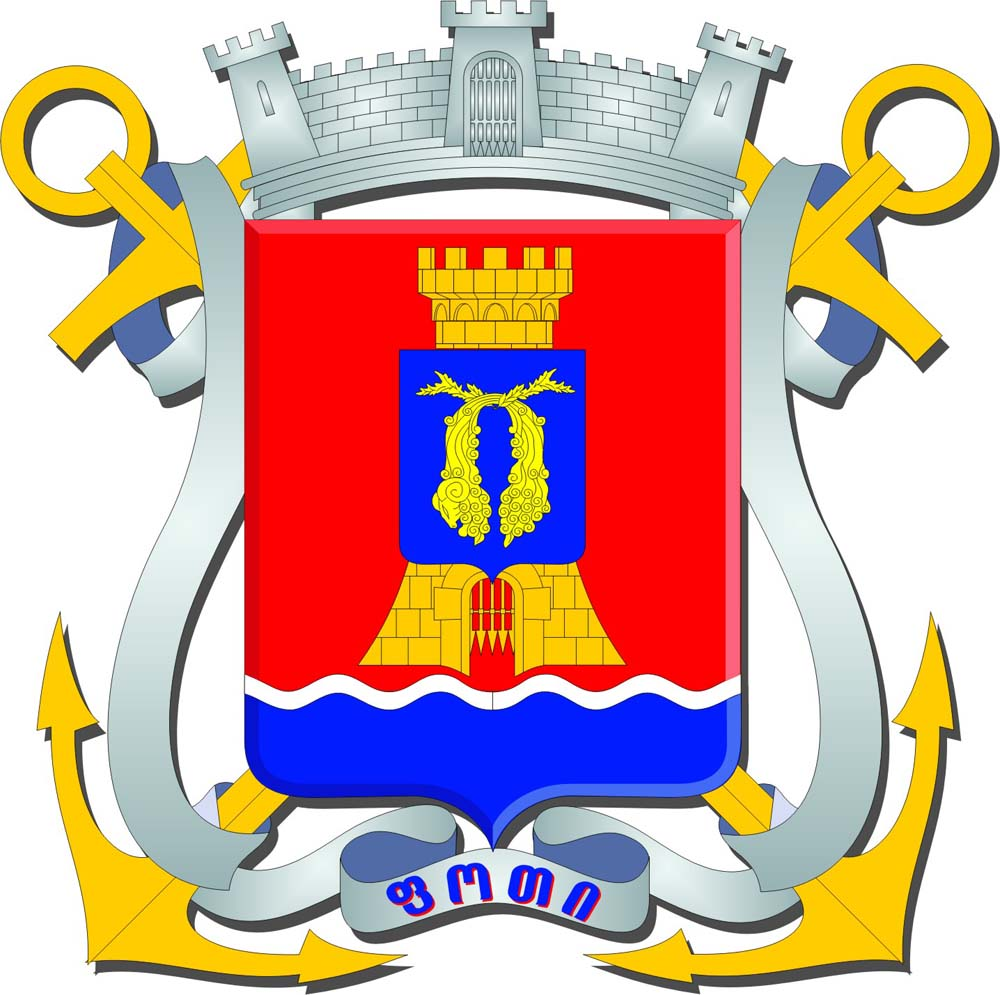
- Flag Seal

- Location of Poti in Georgia Poti (Samegrelo-Zemo Svaneti)
- Coordinates: 42°09′0″N 41°40′0″E
- Country: Georgia
- Mkhare: Samegrelo-Zemo Svaneti
- Established: 7th century BC

Government
  - Type: Mayor–Council
  - Body: Poti City Assembly
  - Mayor: Beka Vacharadze (GD)

Area
  - Total: 65.8 km^{2} (25.4 sq mi)
- Elevation: 0 m (0 ft)

Population (1 January 2024)
  - Total: 41,170
  - Density: 626/km^{2} (1,620/sq mi)
- Time zone: UTC+4 (Georgian Time)
- Postal code: 4400-4499
- Website: poti.gov.ge

Poti (Georgian: ფოთი [pʰo̞t̪ʰi]; Mingrelian: ფუთი, puti; Laz: ჶაში/Faşi or ფაში/Paşi) is a port city in Georgia, located on the eastern Black Sea coast in the region of Samegrelo-Zemo Svaneti in the west of the country. Built near the site of the ancient Greek colony of Phasis and deriving its name from the same, the city has become a major port city and industrial center since the early 20th century. It is also home to a main naval base and the headquarters of the Georgian Navy.

== Etymology ==
The name Poti is linked to Phasis, but the etymology is a matter of a scholarly dispute. "Phasis" (Greek: Φάσις) is first recorded in Hesiod's Theogony (c. 700 BC) as a name of the river, not a town. Since Erich Diehl, 1938, first suggested a non-Hellenic origin of the name and asserted that Phasis might have been a derivative of a local hydronym, several explanations have been proposed, linking the name to the Proto-Georgian-Zan *Poti, Svan *Pasid, and even to a Semitic word, meaning "a gold river".

== History ==
=== Ancient and medieval history ===
The recorded history of Poti and its environments spans over 26 centuries. In Classical antiquity and the early Middle Ages, the area was occupied by the Greek polis of Phasis which was established by the colonists from Miletus led by one Themistagoras at the very end of the 7th, and probably at the beginning of the 6th century BC. The famed Greek semi-mythological voyage of Jason and the Argonauts in search of the Golden Fleece would have entered Georgia at this port and traveled up the river to what is today Kutaisi.

After many years of uncertainty and academic debate, the site of this settlement now seems to be established, thanks to underwater archaeology under tough conditions. Apparently, the lake which the well-informed Ancient Greek author Strabo reported as bounding one side of Phasis has now engulfed it, or part of it. Yet, a series of questions regarding the town’s exact location and identification of its ruins remain open due largely to the centuries-long geomorphological processes of the area as the lower reaches of the Rioni are prone to changes of course across the wetland. Phasis appears to have been an important center of trade and culture in Colchis throughout the Classical period. The section along the river Phasis was a vital component of the presumed trade route from India to the Black Sea, attested by Strabo and Pliny.

Between the 6th and 2nd centuries BC, the town played an active role in these contacts. During the Third Mithridatic War, Phasis came under Roman control. It was where the Roman commander-in-chief Pompey, having crossed into Colchis from Iberia, met the legate Servilius, the admiral of his Euxine fleet in 65 BC. After the introduction of Christianity, Phasis was a seat of a Greek diocese, one of whose bishops, Cyrus, became a Patriarch of Alexandria between 630 and 641 AD. During the Lazic War between the Eastern Roman and Sassanid Iranian empires (542-562), Phasis was attacked, unsuccessfully, by Iranian soldiers.

In the 8th century, the name Poti entered Georgian written sources. It remained a place of maritime trade within the Kingdom of Georgia and was known to medieval European travelers as Fasso. In the 14th century, the Genoese established a trading factory, which proved to be short-lived.

=== Modern history ===
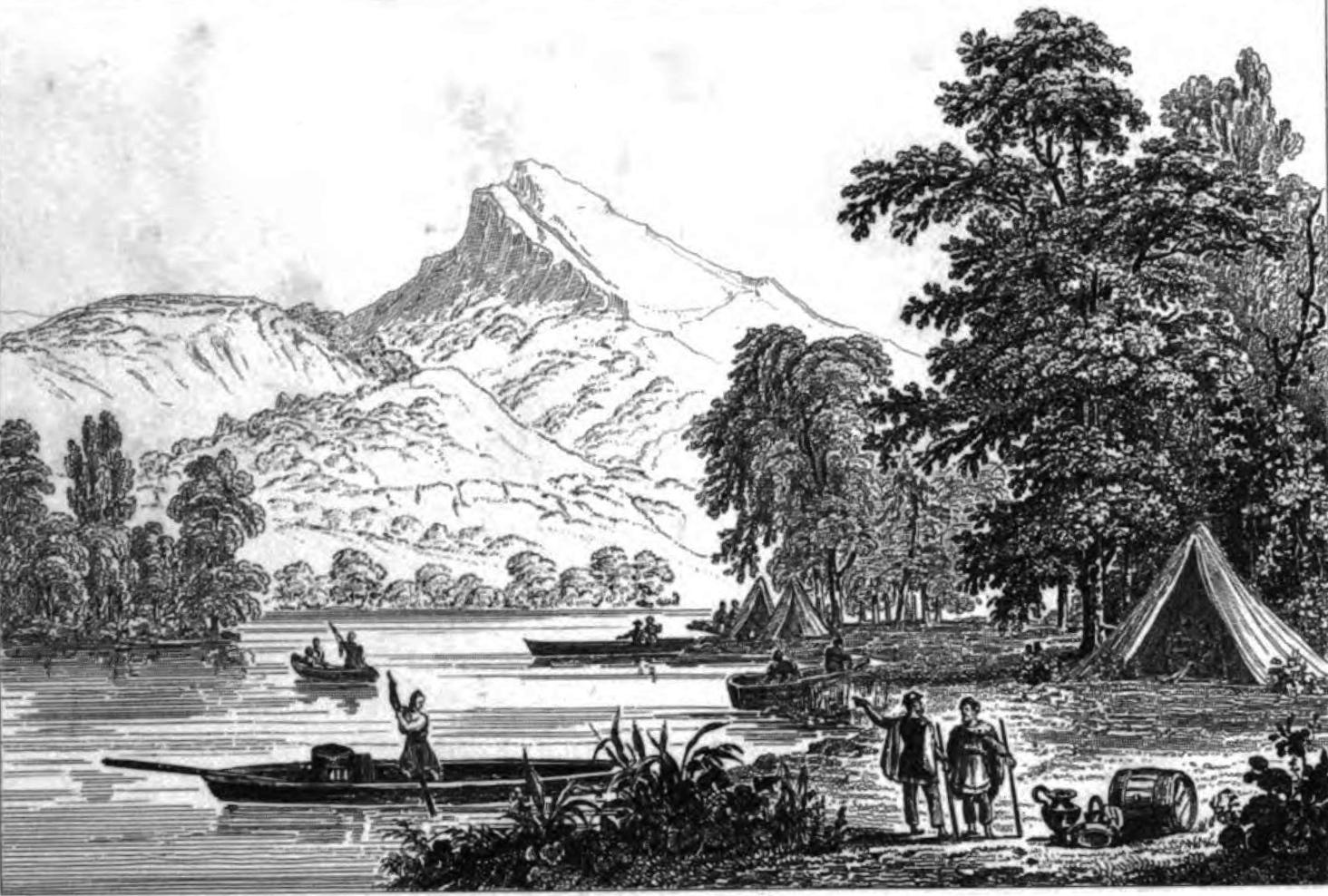
View of Phasis river, 19th century

In 1578, Poti was conquered by the Ottoman Empire. The Turks, who knew the town as Faş, heavily fortified it and made it into one of their Caucasian outposts which were also home to a great slave market. A combined army of the western Georgian princes recovered Poti in 1640, but the town fell under the Ottoman sway again in 1723. Another futile attempt to dispossess the Ottomans of Poti was made by Russo-Georgian forces in 1770 and 1771. Once Russia took control of most of the principal Georgian lands in the 1800s, it again attempted to evict the Turkish garrison from Poti and succeeded in doing so with the help of Georgian auxiliaries under the command of Nino, Princess of Mingrelia in 1809, but was coerced to return the fortress to the Ottomans in the Treaty of Bucharest (1812). The next Russo-Turkish War resulted in the capture of Poti by Russia in 1828. (See Russian conquest of the Caucasus#Black Sea Coast.) The town was subordinated to the Governorate of Kutais and granted the status of a port town in 1858. The seaport was reconstructed between 1863 and 1905. In 1872, the town became the terminus of the Transcaucasus Railway, whence the line led directly to Tiflis (Tbilisi).

Poti particularly grew in size and importance during the mayorship of Niko Nikoladze between 1894 and 1912. Considered to be the founding father of modern Poti, Nikoladze presided over a series of modernizing and construction projects, including a theater, a large cathedral, two gymnasia, a power station, an oil refinery, etc. By 1900, Poti had become one of the major ports on the Black Sea, exporting most of Georgia’s manganese and coal. During the First Russian Revolution, Poti became a scene of workers' strikes and barricade fighting in December 1905. At the beginning of World War I, on 7 November 1914, the Ottoman SMS Breslau appeared off the port of Poti and subjected the railway yards there to a bombardment that lasted three-quarters of an hour, without any direct results.

During a brief period of independence in 1918–1921, Poti was Georgia’s principal window to Europe, also serving as the portal of entry for successive German and British expeditionary forces. On 28 May 1918, a German-Georgian preliminary treaty of alliance was signed at Poti. On 14 March 1921, Poti was occupied by the invading Red Armies of Soviet Russia which installed a Soviet government in Georgia. During the Soviet era, Poti retained its principal function as a seaport and the town was further industrialized and militarized.

Chapel near the port of Poti

During the 2008 war with Russia, Russian warplanes attacked the port. Although a ceasefire was declared on 12 August, the Russian troops continued to occupy the environs of the city until being withdrawn the next month.

== Politics ==
Poti City Assembly (Georgian: ფოთის საკრებულო) is the representative body in Poti City, consisting of 35 members, which is elected every four years. The last election was held in October 2021. Beka Vacharadze of Georgian Dream was elected mayor through the 2nd round against a candidate of the United National Movement.

Party	2017	2021	Current Municipal Assembly
Georgian Dream	15	20	
United National Movement	2	11	
For Georgia		4	
Georgian Roots	3 (Note: Tornike Shonia, Khvicha Tskhvitaria and Zurab Chachua - left GD and joined Georgian Roots.)		
European Georgia	1		
Development Movement	1		
Alliance of Patriots	1		
Democratic Movement	1		
Labour Party	1		
Total	25	35	

== Geography and climate ==
Poti is situated 312 kilometres (194 mi) west of Georgia’s capital, Tbilisi, in a marshy delta created by the major river of western Georgia, the Rioni, at its entrance into the Black Sea. The city lies at an altitude of 2 metres (6 feet 7 inches) above sea level. A portion of Poti's environs recovered from the marshes now accommodate citrus plantation. The city is surrounded by the Kolkheti National Park. It is flanked by the small river Kaparchina to the south-east and Lake Paliastomi to the south-west. Some 5 kilometres (3 miles) to the south is the village Maltaqva, a local beach resort.

The city's climate is humid subtropical (Köppen:Cfa, Trewartha:Cf) with cool winters and hot summers. Average annual precipitation is 2,068 mm (81 in), with the highest recorded value of daily precipitation being 191.4 mm (8 in) on 23 June 2008. Only in 2.6 days per year snow cover is observed.

Highest recorded temperature: 45.2 °C (113 °F) on 30 July 2000

Climate data for Poti (1991–2020, extremes 1981-2020)
Month	Jan	Feb	Mar	Apr	May	Jun	Jul	Aug	Sep	Oct	Nov	Dec	Year
Record high °C (°F)	21.4 (70.5)	25.0 (77.0)	28.7 (83.7)	34.4 (93.9)	39.9 (103.8)	36.5 (97.7)	45.2 (113.4)	38.0 (100.4)	38.3 (100.9)	33.6 (92.5)	27.3 (81.1)	24.5 (76.1)	45.2 (113.4)
Mean daily maximum °C (°F)	10.8 (51.4)	11.9 (53.4)	14.7 (58.5)	19.1 (66.4)	22.5 (72.5)	26.3 (79.3)	28.5 (83.3)	29.1 (84.4)	26.3 (79.3)	22.3 (72.1)	16.8 (62.2)	12.8 (55.0)	20.1 (68.2)
Mean daily minimum °C (°F)	3.9 (39.0)	4.0 (39.2)	6.2 (43.2)	9.1 (48.4)	13.6 (56.5)	18.0 (64.4)	20.8 (69.4)	21.1 (70.0)	17.2 (63.0)	13.2 (55.8)	8.2 (46.8)	5.4 (41.7)	11.7 (53.1)
Record low °C (°F)	−6.2 (20.8)	−10.0 (14.0)	−6.8 (19.8)	−1.0 (30.2)	3.5 (38.3)	9.0 (48.2)	13.4 (56.1)	12.2 (54.0)	7.5 (45.5)	0.0 (32.0)	−1.3 (29.7)	−4.7 (23.5)	−10.0 (14.0)
Average precipitation mm (inches)	154.6 (6.09)	122.1 (4.81)	128.2 (5.05)	84.9 (3.34)	95.1 (3.74)	161.5 (6.36)	227.3 (8.95)	256.7 (10.11)	270.2 (10.64)	232.1 (9.14)	173.5 (6.83)	162.1 (6.38)	2,068.3 (81.44)
Average precipitation days (≥ 1.0 mm)	14	12	12.8	9.4	8.6	8.6	10	10.5	10.7	11	11	13.4	132
Source: NCEI

== Economy ==
Baku-Tbilisi-Poti railway

The service and food industries represent the most important sectors of the economy. The Poti Sea Port (7.7 million tons per annum) is operational. The railway to Tbilisi makes this a more useful port than the natural harbor at Batumi.

In April 2008, Georgia sold a 51% stake of the Poti port to the Investment Authority of the UAE’s Ras Al Khaimah (RAK) emirate to develop a free industrial zone (FIZ) in a 49-year management concession, and to manage a new port terminal. The creation of a new FEZ was officially inaugurated by the President of Georgia Mikheil Saakashvili on 15 April 2008.

As of November 2009, there were plans for a Kerch–Poti ferry route.

== Sport ==
The town's main football team is Kolkheti 1913 Poti who play at the multi-use Fazisi Stadium.

== Fiber optic network ==
A long haul submarine communications cable - Bulgaria–Georgia communications cable - stretching from Varna, Bulgaria across the Black Sea to Poti Georgia was laid during the month of July 2008 onboard the American cable ship CS Tyco Decisive, just a couple of weeks prior to the Russo-Georgian War. This cable system will be Georgia's first privately owned fiber-optic system for the citizens of Georgia. Instead of paying high prices for internet/TV/phone usage through Turkey, Georgians will now be able to pay much less for their own private high-speed fiber optic cable internet cable system usage.

== Military ==
The fiber optic cable network being deployed 7/28/08

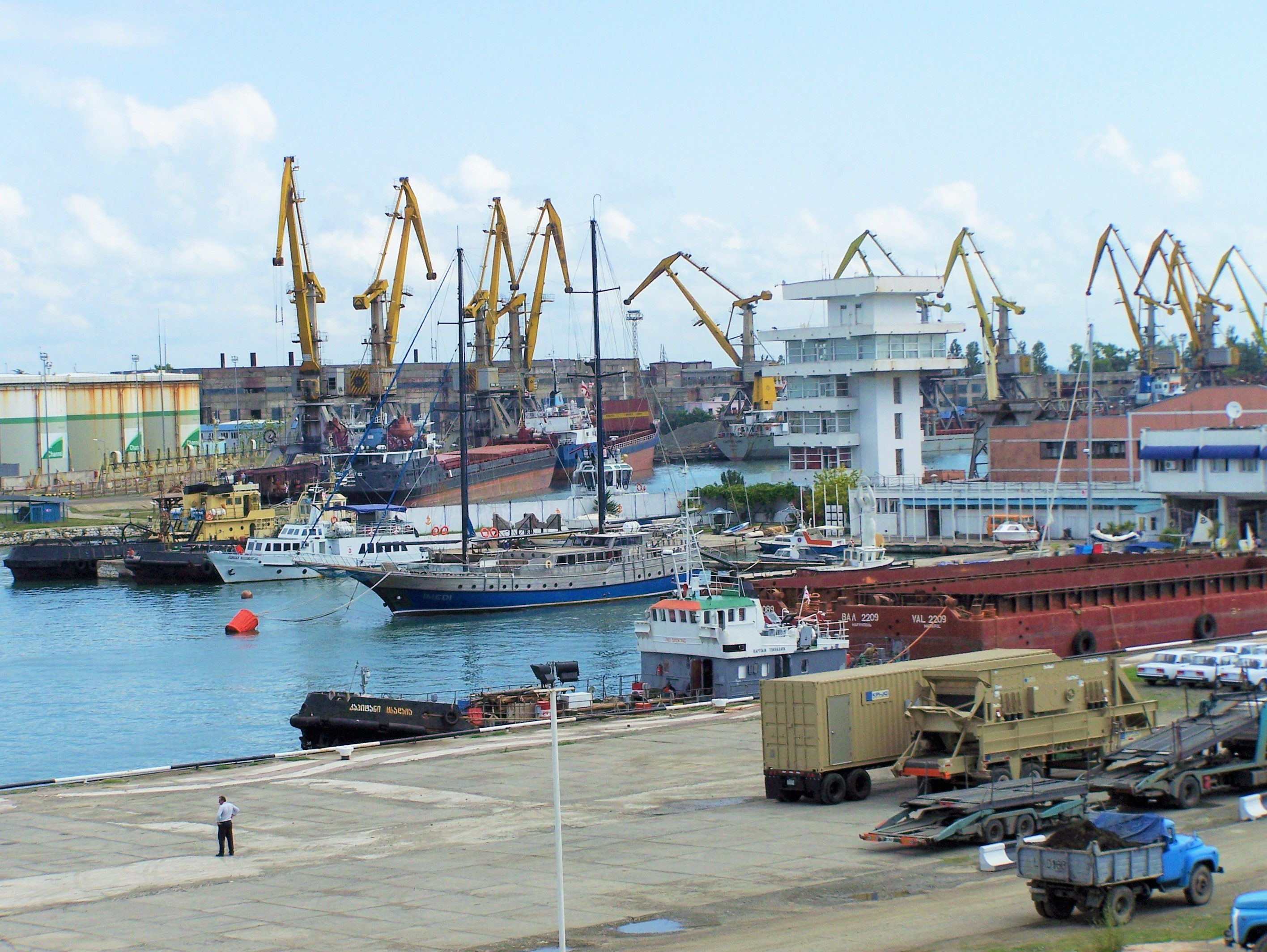
The Port of Poti, Georgia, in July 2008.

The Poti naval base was organized by the Soviet government in July 1941, a month after the German invasion during World War II. Commanded by Major-General Mikhail Kumanin, the base operated as a part of the Black Sea Fleet and included two submarine divisions, a torpedo boat division, coastal guard boat division, two minesweepers, four coastal and six missile batteries, etc. After the German capture of Sevastopol and Novorossiysk in 1942, several destroyers were transferred to be based at Poti which, together with another Georgian port city, Batumi, functioned as a secondary harbor in the Black Sea Campaigns (1941–44). By the early 1990s, the Poti base had accommodated several smaller units of the Soviet Black Sea Fleet, but became essentially defunct after the dissolution of the Soviet Union. In December 1992, Russia withdrew all its vessels and ammunition from the Poti naval base, but an ethnic Georgian commander of one landing ship refused to obey Moscow’s order and displayed a Georgian flag. At almost the same time, the Georgian government created a Joint Naval Brigade, consisting of several boats, a battalion of marines, an artillery division, and a communication detachment. Since then, the Brigade has been enlarged and reequipped with the help of the NATO-member states.

On 9 October 1993, a war-torn Georgia had to legalize the Russian military presence in the country, and lease, among other military facilities, the Poti base to the Russian navy. However, Georgia continued, though fruitlessly, to claim the vessels formerly stationed at Poti as a part of a tripartite Russo-Ukrainian-Georgian dispute over the Soviet Black Sea Fleet shares. By September 1998, the Russian military personnel had been withdrawn from Poti to the Russian base at Batumi under a Russo-Georgian agreement signed earlier that year.

Currently, Poti is a military facility assignment to several of Georgia’s units. These are the headquarters and main base of the Georgian navy, a primary naval logistic support base, a station of a naval squadron, and barracks for a separate light infantry battalion of the Georgian Armed Forces.

== International relations ==
=== Twin towns—Sister cities ===
- Berdyansk, Ukraine
- Chornomorsk, Ukraine
- Kiryat Yam, Israel
- LaGrange, United States
- Larnaca, Cyprus
- Nafplio, Greece
- Östhammar, Sweden
- Pazar, Turkey
- / Sevastopol, (Note: Disputed territory) Ukraine/Russia
- Shanwei, China
- Yazd, Iran (1990)

== See also ==
- Samegrelo-Zemo Svaneti

== Sources ==
- Otar Lordkipanidze (2000), Phasis: The River and City in Colchis. Franz Steiner Verlag, ISBN 3-515-07070-2.
- Stephen F. Jones (2005), Socialism in Georgian Colors: The European Road to Social Democracy, 1883-1917. Harvard University Press, ISBN 0-674-01902-4.
- Richard J. A. Talbert et al. (ed., 2000), Barrington Atlas of the Greek and Roman World. Princeton University Press, ISBN 0-691-04945-9.
