= Ikorta church =

Church building in Georgia

Coordinates: 42°09′59″N 44°09′21″E

The Church in 2013.

The Ikorta church of the Archangel (Georgian: იკორთის მთავარანგელოზის ტაძარი), commonly known as Ikorta (იკორთა) is a 12th-century Georgian Orthodox church located at the outskirts of the village Ikort’a in Shida Kartli region of eastern Georgia. The church was originally a part of Ikorta castle, from which only the citadel and the church remain.

== History ==
Commissioned by the ducal family of Ksani in the reign of King George III of Georgia in 1172, Ikort’a is one in a series of the 11th–13th-century churches of Georgia that set a final canonical model of a Georgian domed cross-in-square church.

The Ikort’a church is a centrally planned, domed rectangular design, with a semicircular apse on the east. The church has a shape of cross with the dome on crossing point of the arms. Apart from the apse arm, the three other arms are quadrangular. The dome, with 12 windows pierced round its tall base, rests upon the corners of the altar and two hexangular (octangular by other sources) pillars. The pillars have bases and capitals, and the transitional arches, resting on them, are decorated by steps and valves. The four side rooms next to the apse are built in two stories. The upper stories are caches and the lower are pastophoria, which are open to the major space of the church with arches. Thus, creating an impression of space unity, this is a special feature of Ikorta. Western arm is connected to the lateral naves through two arches, held on fine pillar. The upper floors of the lateral naves are meant for the nobility, women and choir. In addition to the windows in the dome, the church is well illuminated from the five windows on the side walls, necessary to observe frescos, which is the 12th century tradition. Walls and vaults were plastered and frescoed at the time of construction; but only some fragments of original murals survived in the apse, northern wall and the base of the dome.

The façades and a lower portion of the dome are lavishly ornamented. The step-like arching, made of paired valves, is created according to the 11th century tradition. Central motive of the eastern façade with interconnected cross, rosette, framed window and two rombs, and two deep niches on the sides with ornamentation in upper part, are also the 11th century inventions. This central composition is flanked by vertical motifs of three connected elements on each side with round window, rosette and arch window. Archading continues also to other walls. The western façade has two large windows, each with its own arch, and a rosette above them. Lateral arches here each enclose a quadrangular ornamented stone with small round window. Southern and northern façades both have a high central arch with three windows and two equal lower arches on each side. The tholobate is a rare example of the originally survived. Each window has a decorated valve and arching.

The church was renovated in the 17th century, but the original design was largely preserved. There are two entrance portals, one to the south and one to the west. Original porches have been ruined, and the extant porch to the south is of much later period. There are a solar clock and an ancient Georgian asomtavruli inscription on the western and eastern walls, telling about the construction year and the names of contractors. The solar clock has a semicircle, twelve sectors on it with letters, indicating hours, and a hole for a stick. A shade from the stick showed time. Ten solar clocks of this type have been found throughout Georgia.

During the 1991 Racha earthquake, a large portion of the dome collapsed, and inflicted significant damage on the church. In 1999 the monument was listed among the "100 Most Endangered Sites" (World Monuments Fund, 2000–2001). A reconstruction project is currently under progress.

The Ikort’a church served as a burial ground of the dukes of Ksani, and houses, among others, the tombs of the brothers Shalva and Elizbar of Ksani, and their associate Bidzina, Prince Cholokashvili. These noblemen were tortured to death for having revolted against the Persian domination of Kakheti (eastern Georgia) in 1659, and were eventually canonized by the Georgian Orthodox church.

== See also ==
- Ikorta castle
