= Wedding Palace (Tbilisi) =

Building in Tbilisi, Georgia

- რიტუალების სასახლე

- Location within Tbilisi Location within Georgia

General information
- Coordinates: 41°41′06″N 44°49′40″E

The Wedding Palace or Palace of Rituals (Georgian: რიტუალების სასახლე) is a building in Tbilisi designed by architects Victor Djorbenadze and Vazha Orbeladze. It was built in 1984 as a wedding venue.

== History ==
The building, drawing on influences as diverse as 1920s expressionism and medieval Georgian church architecture, met with mixed critical reviews.

Visiting celebrities were often invited to the Wedding Palace - Margaret Thatcher was treated to a Georgian dance performance during her 1987 visit, and Deep Purple frontman Ian Gillan renewed his vows with wife Bron while touring in 1990.

In 2002 it was purchased by the oligarch Badri Patarkatsishvili for use as his personal residence. In 2013, the Wedding Palace was leased to a private events company and currently hosts weddings, fundraisers, and corporate functions.
