= Victor Djorbenadze =

Georgian architect

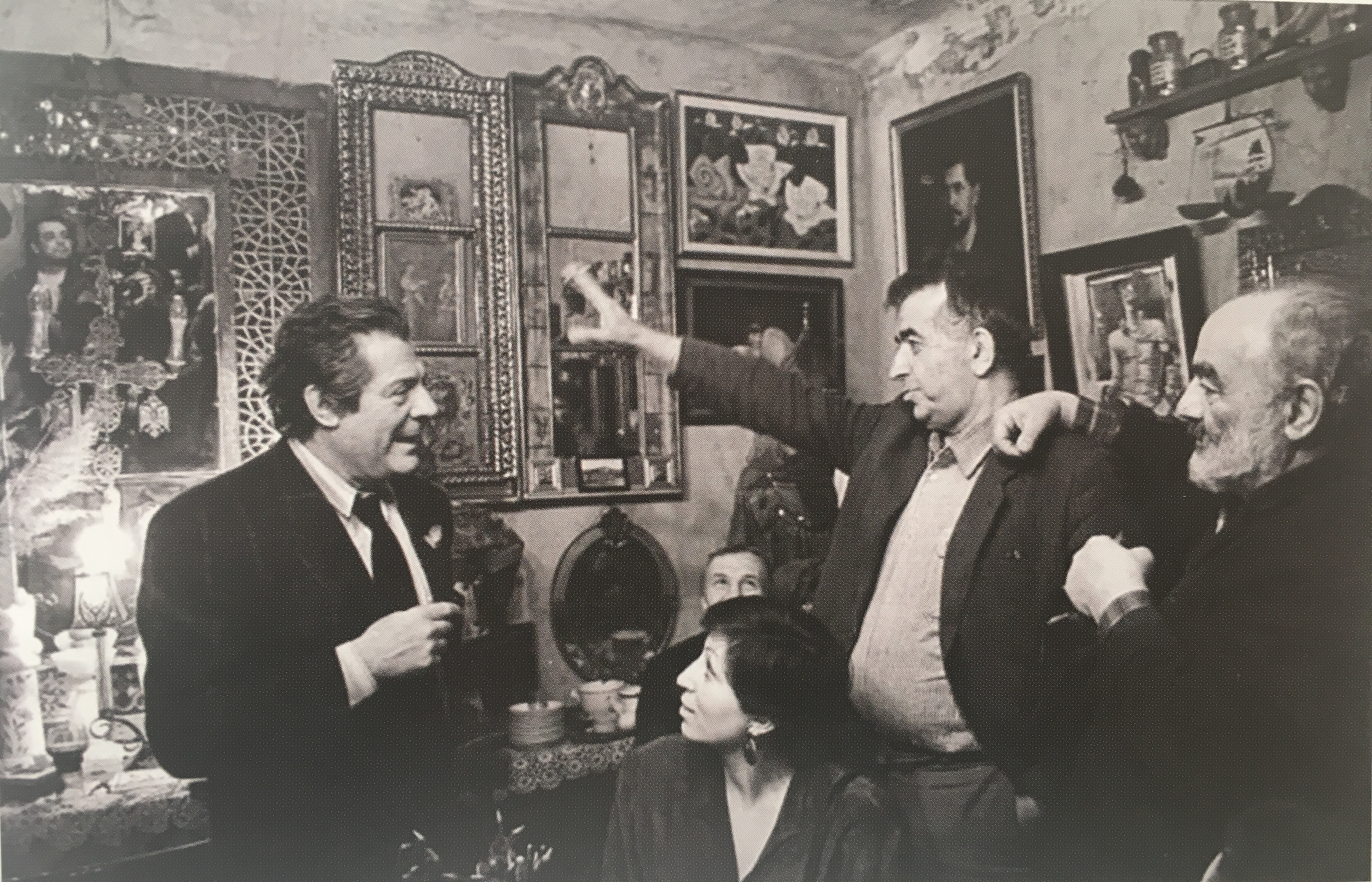
- Djorbenadze with Italian actor Mastroianni (left) and Armenian director Parajanov (right)
- Born: 1925; Kharkiv, Ukraine
- Died: 1999 (aged 73–74); Tbilisi, Georgia
- Occupation: Architect
- Buildings: Wedding Palace (Tbilisi), Mukhatgverdi Cemetery Complex (Tbilisi), Ilia Chavchavadze Museum (Kvareli)

Victor Djorbenadze (Georgian: ვიქტორ ჯორბენაძე) (1925–1999) was a Georgian architect, best known for the Wedding Palace in Tbilisi.

== Early life and education ==
Djorbenadze, known as widely as "Butza" to his friends, was born July 28, 1925, in Kharkiv while his father, Nikoloz Jorbenadze, served in the Red Army. In 1928 he moved to Samtredia, where his mother, Lubov Sanadze, worked as one of the country's leading obstetricians. Due to his mother's status, Djorbenadze enjoyed a privileged childhood with private tutors in music and foreign languages.

He avoided the draft while studying architecture at the Georgian Polytechnic Institute in Tbilisi from 1940 to 1946. Upon graduation, he worked for the design and construction branch of the Samtredia Ministry of Agriculture (1946-1952) before enrolling in the Giprogor Russian Institute of Urban and Investment Development in Moscow from 1952-1956 and apprenticing with Stalinist architect Mikhail Parusnikov.

== Career ==
Djorbenadze returned to Tbilisi in 1957, working first as chief architect of Tbilisi's Kalinin district (covering parts of present-day Mtatsminda, Sololaki, and Rustaveli Avenue neighborhoods), and then at the design and cost-estimation bureau of the Tbilisi executive committee. From 1959 he began work for the municipal planning and design workshop TbilQalaqProekt (Tbilisi City Project), where he spent the rest of his career. In addition to architecture and planning, Djorbenadze had a keen interest in Georgian architectural history, advocated for the protection of historic buildings, and was known to travel around the country documenting monuments at his own expense. He also published essays on architecture, including a 1958 review of Mtskheta as an "architectural ensemble" and thus model of planning cities.

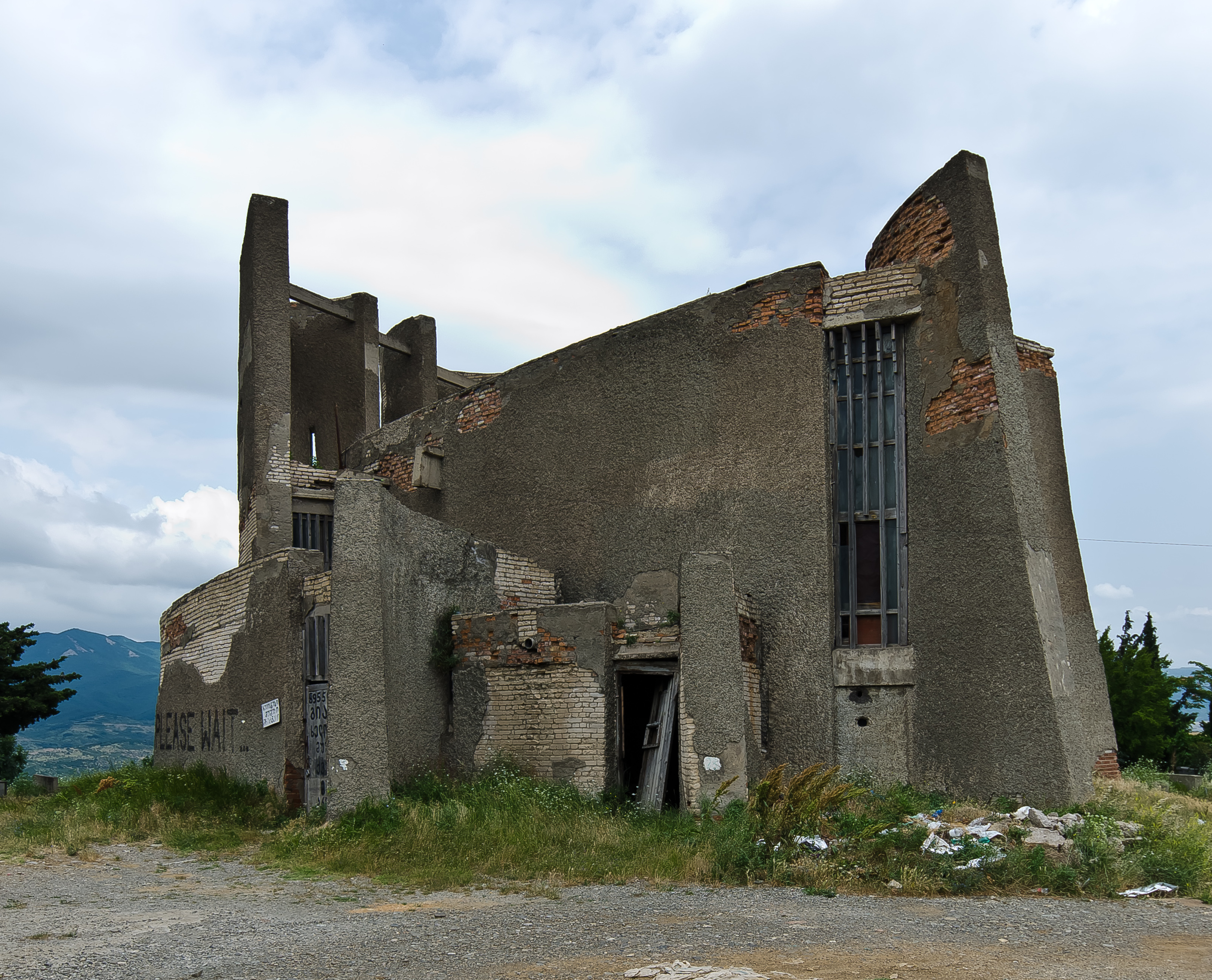
Mukhatgverdi cemetery ceremonial hall (1974)

After collaborating on several cemetery projects with the municipal workshop, Djorbenadze received his first independent commission for a cemetery in Mukhatgverdi, a ridge on the outskirts of Tbilisi overlooking the ancient capital of Mtskheta. The commission was part of both a practical mandate to relieve overcrowding in Tbilisi's central cemeteries, and a Soviet ideological mandate to promote secular funeral rites among a residually Georgian Orthodox population. His designs for the ensemble (including an office, memorial space, water tower, and monument workshop) drew on Le Corbusier's Notre Dame du Haut at Ronchamp, earning him the nickname "Jorbusier" in the local architecture community. The cemetery was completed in 1974.

Working with TbilQalaqProekt colleague Keto Kobakhidze, Djorbenadze continued refining his style in his next project, a small museum at the birthplace of Georgian poet Ilia Chavchavadze. Completed in 1979, the building exemplifies Djorbenadze's clean, sculptural exteriors and flowing interiors illuminated by stained glass. At the same time, Djorbenadze was developing plans for a masterpiece: Tbilisi's Wedding Palace. Like the cemetery complex, the wedding palace was intended to bring life milestones in line with secular Soviet dogma while still making concessions to the public taste for ritual. In the 1960s and 70s, Tbilisi had several wedding houses, usually located in repurposed historic buildings or occupying the first floor of newer residential buildings. Although they included decorative elements, these institutions were primarily registration offices and offered little in the way of festive ambience – especially when compared to traditional Georgian church weddings. Djorbenadze proposed a grand wedding palace design that incorporated elements of Georgian church architecture: frescoes, a bell tower, soaring interior spaces. These elements raised objections from municipal authorities, appalled by the inclusion of ecclesiastical iconography in the very building intended to supplant religious ceremonies. Eduard Shevardnadze, however, defended Djorbenadze's design to the state committees, and his design was approved. The Wedding Palace was completed in 1984, with a grand opening on Tbilisoba, a municipal holiday instituted by Shevardnadze in 1979. The exuberantly phallic building, drawing on influences as diverse as 1920s expressionism and medieval Georgian church architecture, met with mixed critical reviews.

After Georgia declared independence from the Soviet Union, the Georgian Orthodox Church opened a competition for a new national cathedral in Tbilisi in 1990. Djorbenadze and colleague Shota Kavlashvili submitted a radical, postmodern design, including spires and glass domes. Despite personal endorsement from the chair of the Union of Architects of Georgia to Patriarch Ilia II, the design was rejected in favor of Archil Mindiashvili’s more traditional plan for Sameba Trinity Cathedral. Civil unrest and economic turmoil in the 1990s prevented Djorbenadze from completing any further buildings.

== Personal life ==
Djorbenadze was known as a "number one dandy" in his youth, and maintained close connections to major figures in Tbilisi's cultural scene throughout his life, including Nato Vachnadze, Yuri Mechitov, and Sergei Parajanov. He never married, and his close friendship with Parajanov (who was imprisoned in 1973 for perceived "subversive proclivities") sparked rumors.

Victor Djorbenadze died in Tbilisi in 1999 after suffering from dementia and emphysema. His "foster son," distant relative Irakli Kovzanadze, inherited his archive and estate. The archive was indexed by Elene Kalandadze, with more than 200 items, across 56 packages. Djorbenadze is buried at the Mukhatgverdi Cemetery, which he had designed.

The street he used to live on in Avlabari, previously called Ruissi Street, now carries his name. The memorial volume to his life issued in 2013 carries a collection of his works, various photographs, and also photographs from his private apartment.
