= Poti Cathedral =

Georgian Orthodox cathedral in Poti, Georgia

Coordinates: 42°08′32″N 41°40′29″E

Poti Cathedral ფოთის საკათედრო ტაძარი
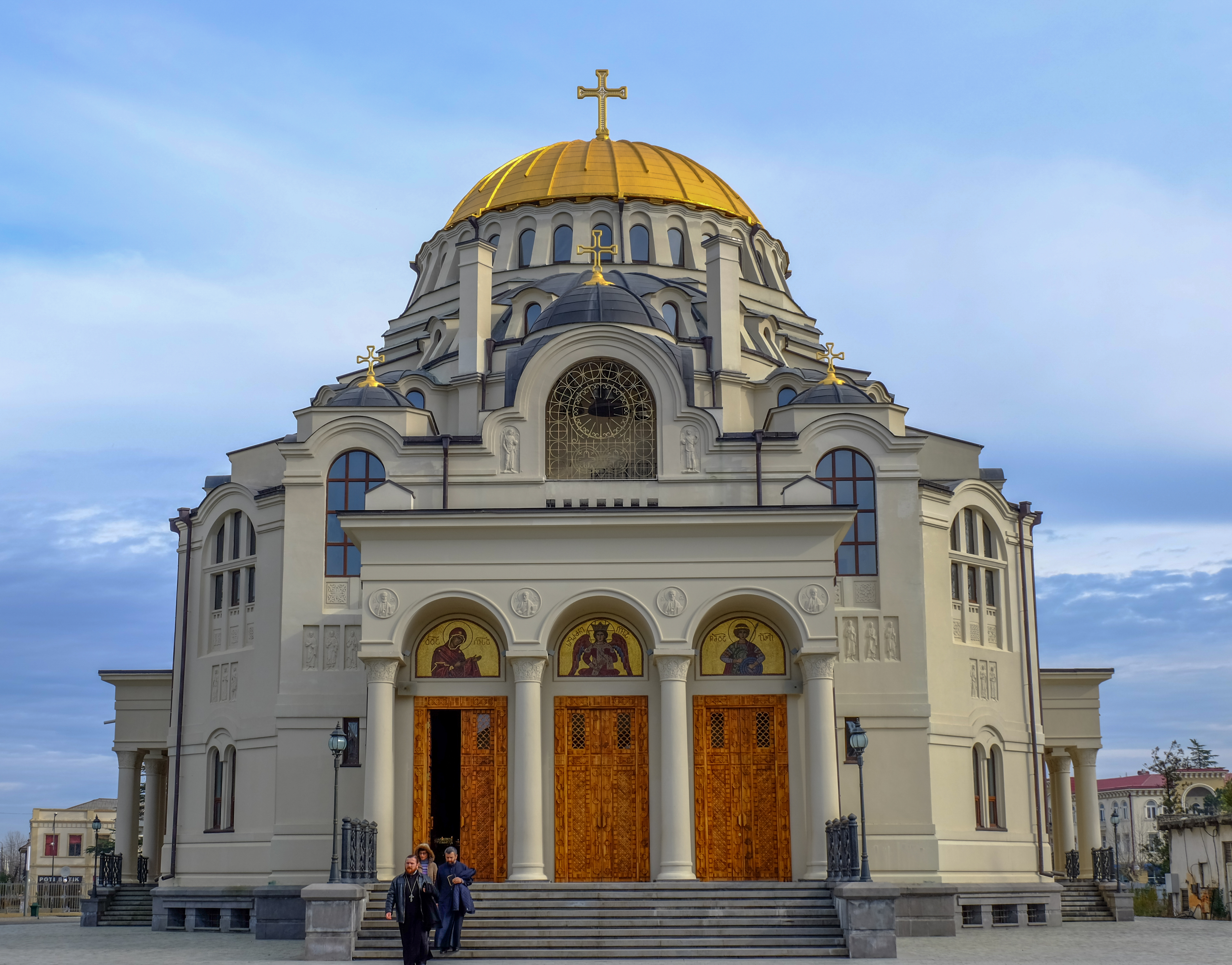
- Poti Cathedral

Religion
- Affiliation: Georgian Orthodox

Location
- Location: Poti, Georgia
- Interactive map of Poti Cathedral ფოთის საკათედრო ტაძარი

Architecture
- Architects: A. Zelenko, M. Marfeld
- Type: Church
- Style: Neo-Byzantine
- Groundbreaking: 1906
- Completed: 1907

Specifications
- Capacity: 1,000 m^{3} (area); 3,000 worshipers
- Length: 48 m
- Width: 38 m

Poti Cathedral (Georgian: ფოთის საკათედრო ტაძარი), or Poti Soboro Cathedral, is a Georgian Orthodox church in downtown Poti, Georgia.

== History ==
The cathedral is an imitation of Hagia Sophia in Istanbul, and it was built in 1906–07 with the great contribution of Niko Nikoladze, the mayor of Poti. Notably, Niko Nikoladze chose the location of the cathedral in the center of the town to make it viewable from every side of Poti.

Alexander Zelenko and Robert Marfeld were the architects of this Neo-Byzantine cathedral and the capacity of the church is 2,000 people. The ornaments and decorations are modeled after the medieval Christian cathedrals in the Trabzon mountains. The Poti Cathedral has three iconostases and among the main decoration of the iconostasis are the icons of St. Nino, St. Andrew the First Called, and the St. David the Builder.

This is one of the earliest examples of reinforced concrete applied to a church. The Hennebique system was employed following a project made by the office's engineers in Paris. Several projects were made, but because of the bad soil, a traditional solution in masonry was not adequate. So, the reinforced concrete was used for the foundations and the entire structure, domes comprised.

In 1923, after the Red Army invasion of Georgia, the Communist government turned it into a theater and the bells were donated to the industrialization foundation.

In 2005, the cathedral was restored to the Georgian Orthodox Church.

== Gallery ==
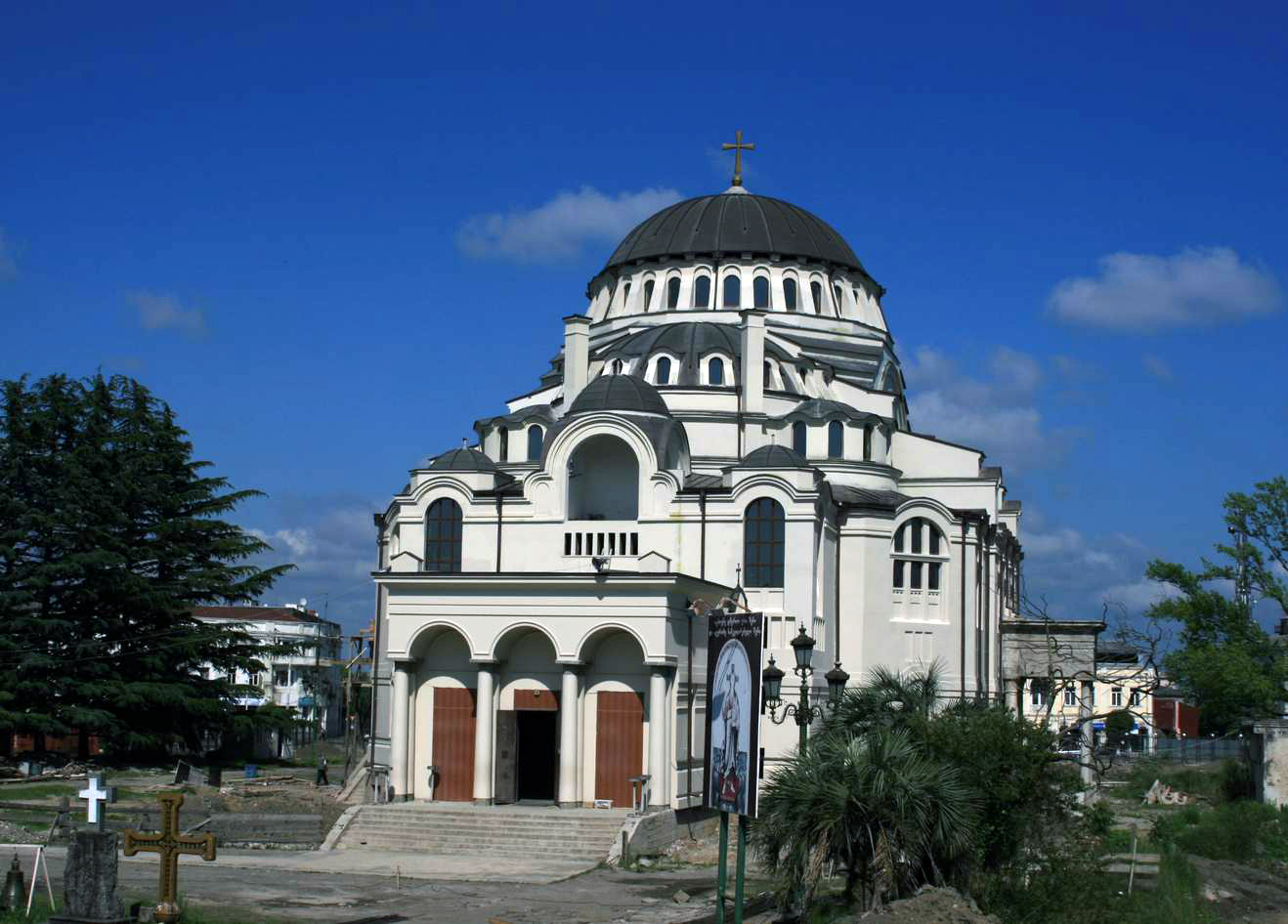

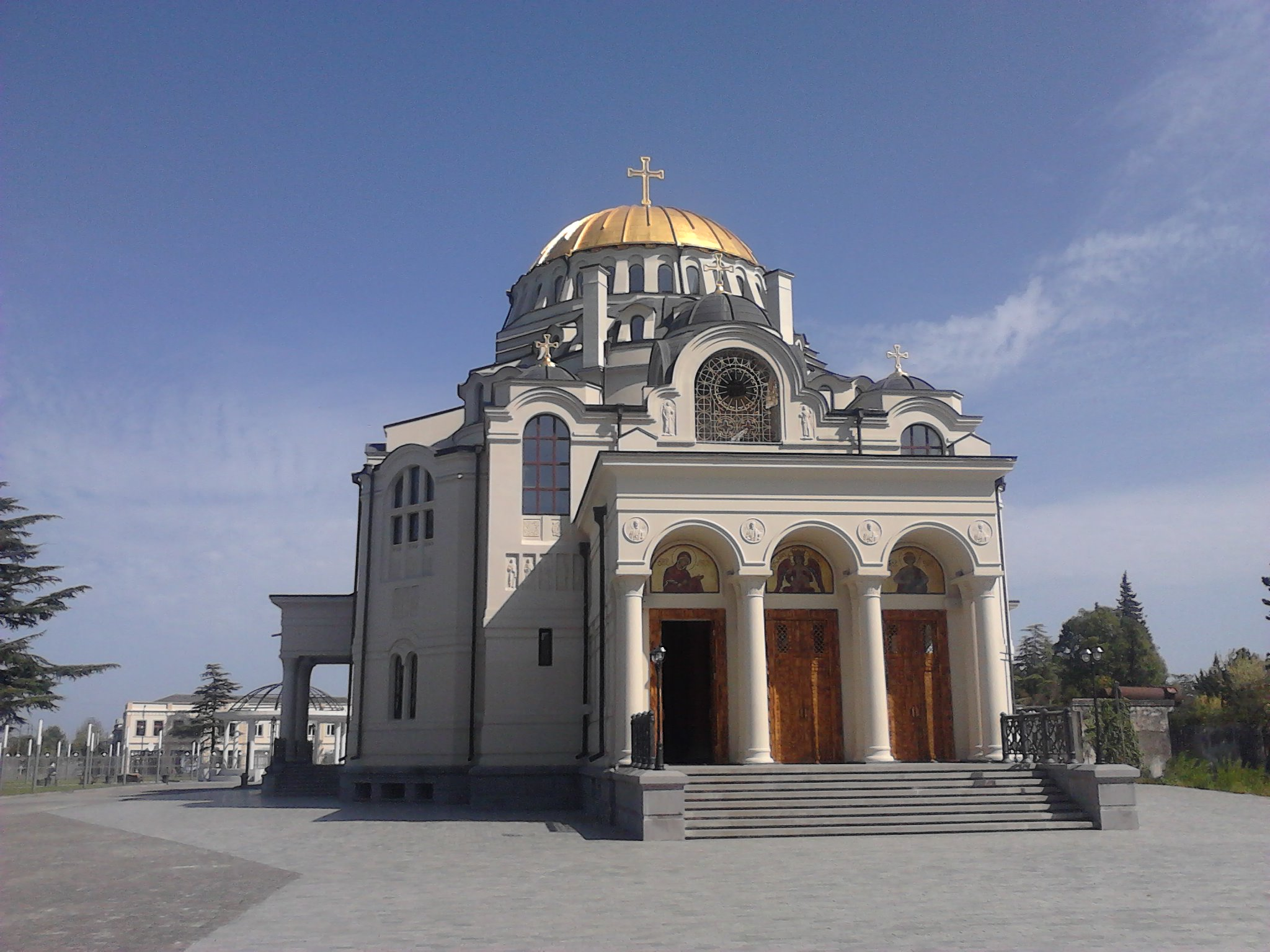

== See also ==
- List of largest Eastern Orthodox church buildings
