= Vazha Orbeladze =

Georgian architect (born 1941)

Vazha Orbeladze (Georgian: ვაჟა ორბელაძე; born 3 February 1941) is a Georgian architect.

Orbeladze's best-known works are the Wedding Palace (Palace of Rituals) in Tbilisi and McDonald's restaurant in Tbilisi and Piazza Square in Batumi. He has also worked on reconstruction of the historical districts of Tbilisi, Sighnaghi, and Telavi. He was named an honorary citizen of Tbilisi in 2007 and awarded Georgia's St. George's Order of Victory.
