= List of tallest Eastern Orthodox church buildings =

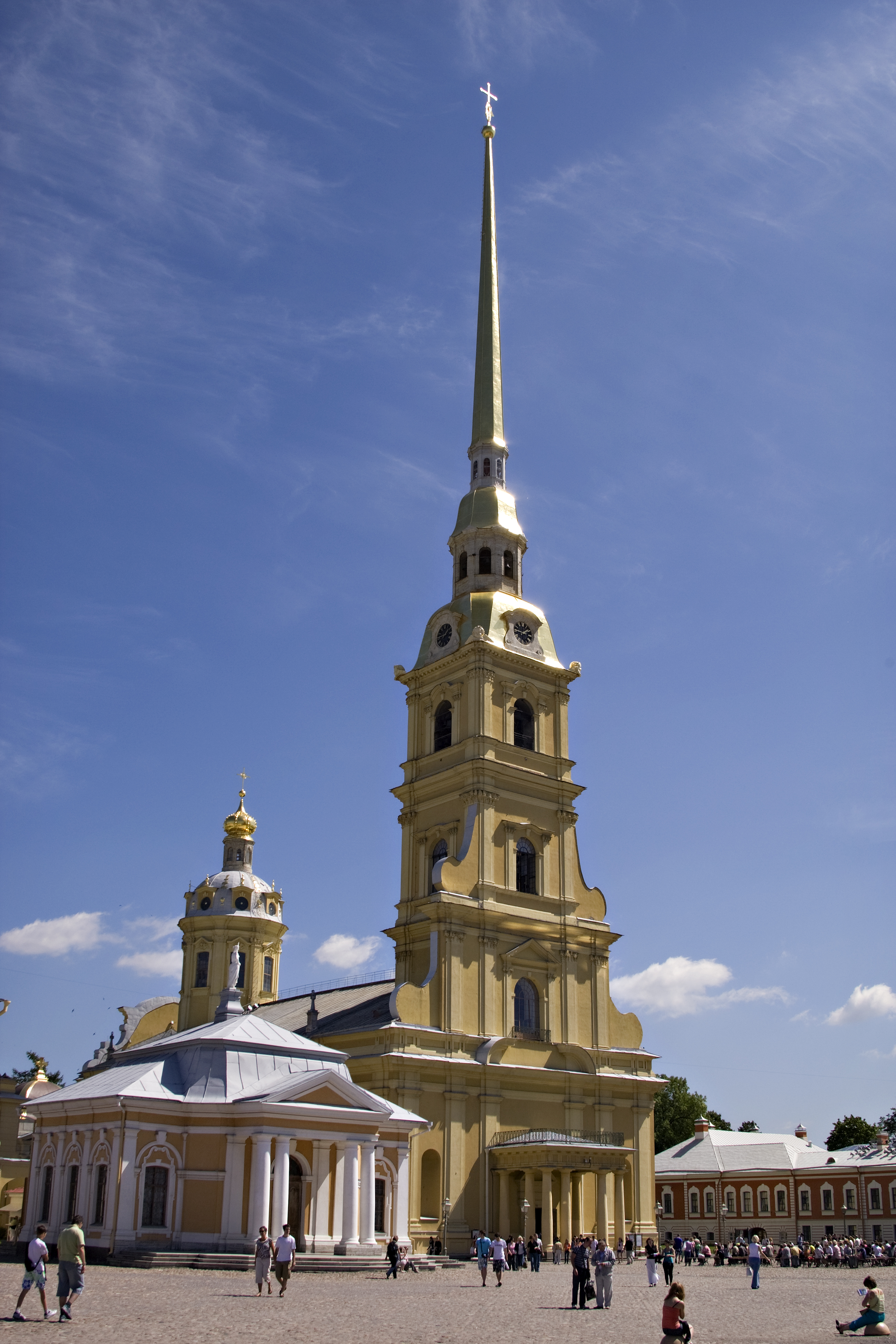
Peter and Paul Cathedral in Saint Petersburg, with its tallest Orthodox bell tower (122 m).

This is a list of tallest Orthodox church buildings in the world, all those higher than 70 metres (230 feet).

Traditionally, an Orthodox church building is crowned by one or several domes with Orthodox crosses on the top of each. The overall height of the temple is measured by the highest point of the cross above the main temple.

The number of domes on individual churches often serve a symbolic purpose. One dome is a symbol of Christ or God, three domes are symbolic of Trinity, five domes symbolize Christ and Four Evangelists, seven domes reference the First seven ecumenical councils which formulated the basic dogmas of the Orthodox Church, and thirteen domes correspond to Christ and his twelve Apostles. Other numbers are also encountered.

An Orthodox church building may also have a bell tower or zvonnitsa, either a part of the main church building, or standalone structure. Typically, a bell tower is higher than the main temple.

This list is divided into two sections, one listing the highest temples and the other listing the highest bell towers or zvonnitsas.

== Churches and cathedrals ==
Rank	Height m (ft)	Name	Image	Notes	Years of construction	City	Country
1	127 m (417 ft)	People's Salvation Cathedral		It is the tallest (127m), longest (126m) and largest (by volume (323,000 m^{3}) and area (7,200 m^{2})) Orthodox church building in the world.	2010–2025	Bucharest	Romania
2	122.5 m (402 ft)	Peter and Paul Cathedral		Three-level bell tower is a part of the church. It is crowned with a gilded spire. The figure of a flying angel is at the very top of the structure.	1712–1733	Saint Petersburg	Russia
3	103.4 m (339 ft)	Cathedral of Christ the Saviour		The original Cathedral had been built in 1839–1883, but was demolished during the Soviet period on Stalin's orders in 1931. Rebuilt once again, it is the main cathedral and second largest church building of the Russian Orthodox Church, having a capacity for some 10,000 people.	1995–2000	Moscow	Russia
4	101.5 m (333 ft)	Saint Isaac's Cathedral		A masterpiece of late Classicism The largest church building in Russia (both by volume and area). Second largest Orthodox church building in the world (by volume and by area).	1818–1858	Saint Petersburg	Russia
5	96 m (315 ft)	Khabarovsk Metropolitan Cathedral		The location of the cathedral was chosen by the patriarch Alexis II of Moscow during the helicopter flight over Khabarovsk	2001–2004	Khabarovsk	Russia
6	95 m (312 ft)	Main Cathedral of the Russian Armed Forces			2018–2020	Odintsovsky District	Russia
7	93.7 m (307 ft)	Smolny Cathedral of the Resurrection		The original project also included the 140-metre-high standalone bell tower, that was never built	1751–1835	Saint Petersburg	Russia
8	90.5 m (297 ft)	Timișoara Orthodox Cathedral		Located in the very center of the city. The second tallest church in Romania	1934–1946	Timișoara	Romania
9	87.1 m (286 ft)	Holy Trinity Cathedral of Tbilisi		The main cathedral of the Georgian Orthodox Church	1995–2002	Tbilisi	Georgia
10	87 m (285 ft)	Alexander Nevsky Novoyarmarochny Cathedral		Located on the spit of Oka and Volga rivers. Built in commemoration of the visit of Nizhny Novgorod Fair by Emperor Alexander II of Russia	1867–1880	Nizhny Novgorod	Russia
11–12	85 m (279 ft)	Saint Trinity Cathedral in Baia Mare		Tallest cathedral in Maramureș, Romania	2003–2026	Baia Mare	Romania
11–12	85 m (279 ft)	Annunciation Cathedral in Voronezh		Built in the Russian Revival style in Pervomaysky (former City) Garden – a place where never before was the church	1998–2009	Voronezh	Russia
13	82 m (269 ft)	Cathedral of the Nativity		Located in Mărășești-Zamca neighbourhood, near the city center. The tallest cathedral in the Moldavia region.	1991–2015	Suceava	Romania
14	81 m (266 ft)	Church of the Savior on Blood		The name refers to the blood of Tsar Alexander II of Russia, who was assassinated on that site in 1881. Also known as the Cathedral of the Resurrection of Christ	1883–1907	Saint Petersburg	Russia
15–16	80 m (260 ft)	Trinity Cathedral, Saint Petersburg		The dome was reconstructed after the 2006 fire	1828–1835	Saint Petersburg	Russia
15–16	80 m (260 ft)	Annunciation Cathedral in Kharkiv		In 1997 a fire damaged the dome and the cross of the bell tower	1888–1901	Kharkiv	Ukraine
17	78.3 m (257 ft)	Church of Saint Sava		Built on the place where the relics of Saint Sava are thought to have been burned in 1595 by the Ottomans.	1935–2020	Belgrade	Serbia
18–19	78 m (256 ft)	Trinity Cathedral in Pskov		Located in the Pskov Krom (or Kremlin)	1682–1699	Pskov	Russia
18–19	78 m (256 ft)	Săpânța-Peri Monastery		Tallest wooden church in the world	1998–2003	Săpânța	Romania
20	77 m (253 ft)	Transfiguration Cathedral in Nikolo-Ugresh monastery		The monastery was often visited by the young Peter I of Russia. The cathedral is the main one in the monastery and has a space for some 7000 people.	1880–1894	Dzerzhinsky	Russia
21	76 m (249 ft)	Cathedral of Our Lady of Kazan in Stavropol		Located at the highest point of the city.		Stavropol	Russia
22	75.6 m (248 ft)	Trinity Cathedral in Morshansk			1836–1857	Morshansk	Russia
23	75 m (246 ft)	Dormition Cathedral in Astrakhan		Located inside the Astrakhan kremlin	1698	Astrakhan	Russia
24	74.6 m (245 ft)	Ascension Cathedral in Novocherkassk		Cathedral of the Don Cossacks Army	1805–1905	Novocherkassk	Russia
25–26	74 m (243 ft)	All Saints Monument Church		Monument Church dedicated to All Saints and the memory of those who unjustly perished		Minsk	Belarus
25–26	74 m (243 ft)	Ascension Cathedral in Yelets		Inside the cathedral there is a rich iconostasis with gilded wood carvings	1845–1889	Yelets	Russia
27	73 m (240 ft)	Cathedral of Christ the Saviour in Kaliningrad		Located on the central square of the city	2004–2006	Kaliningrad	Russia
28	72 m (236 ft)	St. Michael's Cathedral in Cherkasy		Built in the Neo-Byzantine style, 136 metres tall belfry under construction	1994–2002	Cherkasy	Ukraine
29	71.5 m (235 ft)	Kazan Cathedral in St. Petersburg		According to the wishes of the Emperor Paul of Russia, the cathedral was modelled after St. Peter's Basilica in Rome	1801–1811	Saint Petersburg	Russia
30	70.6 m (232 ft)	Naval Cathedral in Kronstadt		The cathedral was designed especially high to serve as a landmark for those in the sea	1902–1913	Kronstadt	Russia
31–33	70 m (230 ft)	Cathedral of the Lord's Ascension, Bacău		Still in construction	1991–2018	Bacău	Romania
31–33	70 m (230 ft)	Alexander Nevsky Cathedral		Built in the style of classicism	1818–1823	Izhevsk	Russia
31–33	~ 70 m (230 ft)	Cathedral of Saints Peter and Paul		Modelled after St. Basil's Cathedral in Moscow, but has a more pyramidal form	1894–1904	Peterhof	Russia

== Bell towers ==
Rank	Height m (ft)	Name	Image	Notes	Years of construction	Location
1	122.5 m (402 ft)	Peter and Paul Cathedral		The three-level bell tower is part of the church. It is crowned with a gilded spire. The figure of a flying angel is at the very top of the structure.	1712–1733	Saint Petersburg; Russia
2	116 m (381 ft)	Transfiguration Cathedral in Rybinsk		Five-storey bell tower crowned by a gilded spire.	1797–1804	Rybinsk; Russia
3	107 m (351 ft)	Monastery of Our Lady of Kazan		Tallest Christian structure in the Central Federal District of Russia.	2009–2011	Tambov; Russia
4	106 m (348 ft)	Resurrection Cathedral in Shuya		A standalone Orthodox bell tower. Tallest in the Ivanovo Oblast.	1810–1832	Shuya; Russia
5	97 m (318 ft)	Annunciation Cathedral		Built in the Pseudo-Russian style.	1998–2009	Voronezh; Russia
6	96.52 m (316.7 ft)	Great Lavra Belltower		Located in the Kyiv Pechersk Lavra, part of a World Heritage Site	1731–1745	Kyiv; Ukraine
7	93.7 m (307 ft)	Peter and Paul Church		The highest rural bell tower in Russia.		Porechye-Rybnoye; Yaroslavl Oblast; Russia
8	93 m (305 ft)	Nikolo-Ugresha monastery		The bell tower is adjacent to the other buildings of the monastery.	1758–1763, rebuilt in в 1859 г.	Dzerzhinsky; Russia
9	90.3 m (296 ft)	Nikolo-Berlyukovsky Monastery		In old Russian measures, the height of the bell tower is equal to 127 arshin and 4 vershoks.	1895–1899	the village of Avdotyino; Moscow Oblast; Russia
10	89.5 m (294 ft)	Assumption Cathedral in Kharkiv		About 3.5 million bricks and 65.5 tons of iron were used for construction.	1821–1841	Kharkiv; Ukraine
11	88 m (289 ft)	Trinity Lavra of St. Sergius		Five-storey bell tower.	1740–1770	Sergiyev Posad; Russia
12	83.2 m (273 ft)	Assumption Cathedral in Ryazan		Built by several different architects. Located in the Ryazan Kremlin.	1789–1840	Ryazan; Russia
13	82 m (269 ft)	All Saints Cathedral in Tula		At the corners of the first level there are sculptures of angels with trumpets.	1776–1825	Tula; Russia
14	81.6 m (268 ft)	Saint Trinity Monastery in Alatyr		The bell tower is included in the Russian Book of Records.	the monastery is founded in 1584	Alatyr; Russia
15–16	81 m (266 ft)	Ivan the Great Bell Tower		Located on Cathedral Square in the Moscow Kremlin.	1532–1543	Moscow; Russia
15–16	81 m (266 ft)	Saint Assumption Sarov Monastery		In good weather the buildings of the Serafimo-Diveevsky Monastery can be seen from the bell tower.	1789–1799	Sarov; Russia
17	80 m (260 ft)	John the Evangelist Monastery in Poschupovo		The monastery is situated on the right bank of the Oka River.	1901	Poschupovo, Ryazan Oblast; Russia
18	79.9 m (262 ft)	Dormition Cathedral in Astrakhan Kremlin		The height of the bell tower is 37 sazhen. The cross is 7 metres high.		Astrakhan; Russia
19	79.5 m (261 ft)	John the Baptist Church		The bell tower was built in the Neo-Byzantine style after the project of engineer Kulchitsky. Sponsored by the merchant Diomid Mitrofanovich Khutaryov.	1891–1895	Serpukhov District of Moscow Oblast; Russia
20	78.5 m (258 ft)	St. Sophia Cathedral in Vologda		The bells of the tower were made by Dutch, Russian and German bellmakers in the 17th, 18th and 19th centuries.	1869–1870	Vologda; Russia
21	78 m (256 ft)	Novospassky Monastery		The monastery played a crucial role in repelling the attack of Crimean Tatars in 1591.	1759–1795	Moscow; Russia
22	77 m (253 ft)	Transfiguration Cathedral in Odesa		The bells are controlled by an electronic device capable of playing some 99 melodies.	2000–2001	Odesa; Ukraine
23–24	76 m (249 ft)	Resurrection Cathedral in Kashin		The church is under restoration.	1816–1886	Kashin; Russia
23–24	76 m (249 ft)	Bell Tower of Saint Sophia's Cathedral in Kyiv		Part of a World Heritage Site		Kyiv; Ukraine
25	75.6 m (248 ft)	Tobolsk Kremlin bell tower		The only stone kremlin in Siberia.	1794–1809	Tobolsk; Russia
26–28	75 m (246 ft)	Cathedral of the Nativity of the Theotokos		The bell ringing is heard in the radius of 42 versts around the tower.		Rostov-on-Don; Russia
26–28	75 m (246 ft)	St. Nicholas Church in Venyov		The church was demolished in 1950s but the bell tower still stands.	1801–1843	Venyov; Russia
26–28	~75 m (246 ft)	The Church of Saint Myrrhbearers in Kaluga		The construction cost was 64,500 rubles.	1818–1820	Kaluga; Russia
29	74.5 m (244 ft)	The Flooded Belfry		Now the bell tower stands amid the waters of the Uglich Reservoir, which covered the old city center of Kalyazin in 1939.	1796–1800	Kalyazin; Russia
30	74 m (243 ft)	Epiphany Cathedral in Kazan		There is a temple on the second level of the bell tower.	1895–1897	Kazan; Russia
31–34	72 m (236 ft)	Novodevichy Convent		The bell tower consist of six octagonal levels.	1690	Moscow; Russia
31–34	72 m (236 ft)	Monastery of the Deposition in Suzdal		The bell tower was built to commemorate the victory in the Patriotic War of 1812.	1813–1819	Suzdal; Russia
31–34	72 m (236 ft)	Cathedral of Saint George the Martyr		The total weight of the bells is 18.5 tons.	1848–1872	Odintsovo; Russia
31–34	72 m (236 ft)	Valaam Monastery		The monastery is situated on the Valaam Archipelago in Karelia.	1896	Valaam; Russia
35	70.3 m (231 ft)	Serafimo-Diveevsky Monastery		In Soviet times the bell tower was used for TV transmissions.	1848–1872	Diveyevo, Nizhny Novgorod Oblast; Russia
36–37	70 m (230 ft)	Ascension Monastery in Tambov			2007–2012	Tambov; Russia
36–37	70 m (230 ft)	Trinity Cathedral in Gus-Zhelezny		Built in the, rare for Russia, Gothic Revival style.	1802–1868	Gus-Zhelezny; Russia

== See also ==
- List of tallest churches
- List of tallest domes
- List of largest Eastern Orthodox church buildings
