= List of cathedrals in Russia =

This is the list of cathedrals in Russia sorted by denomination.

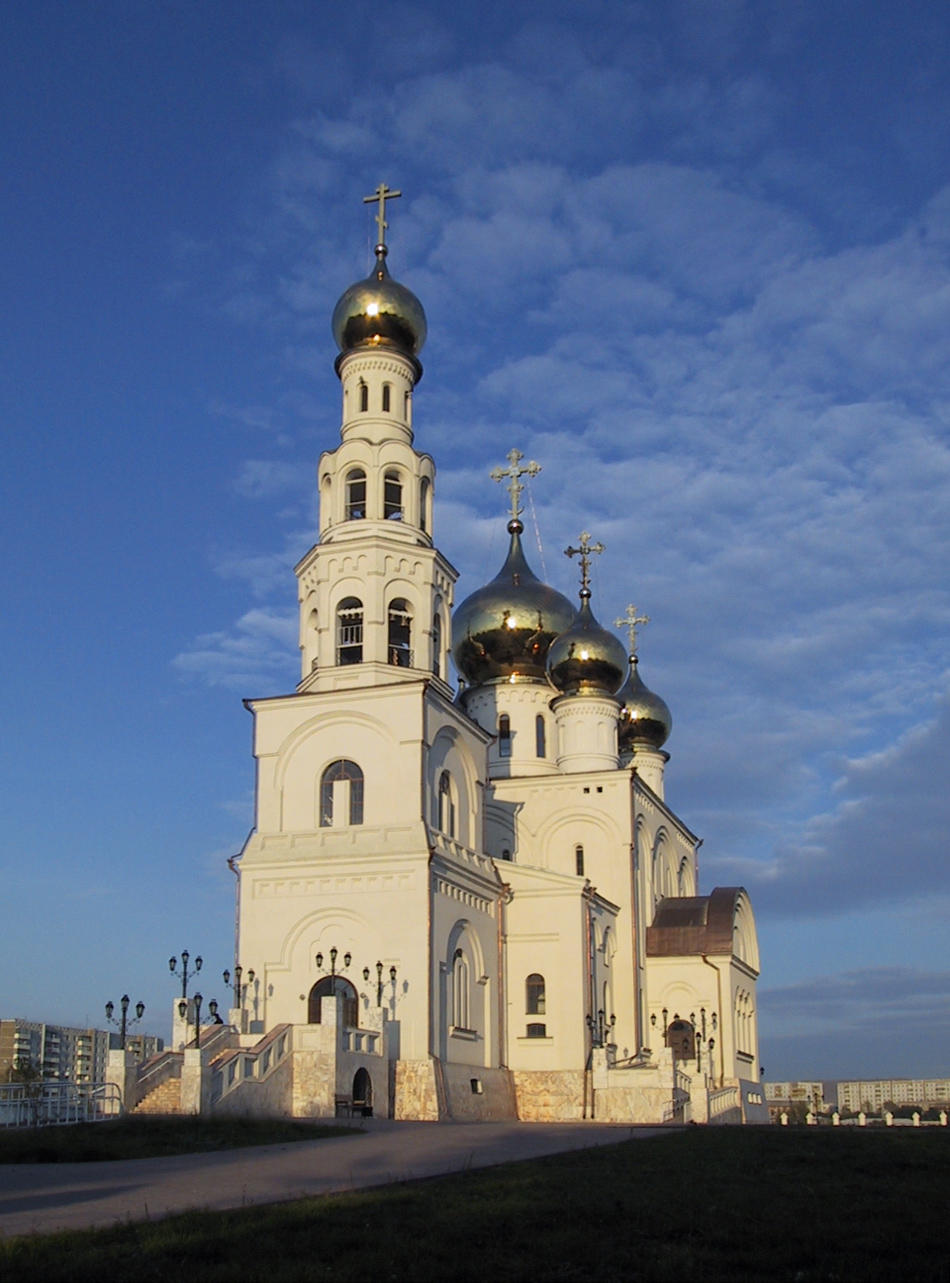
Transfiguration Cathedral in Abakan

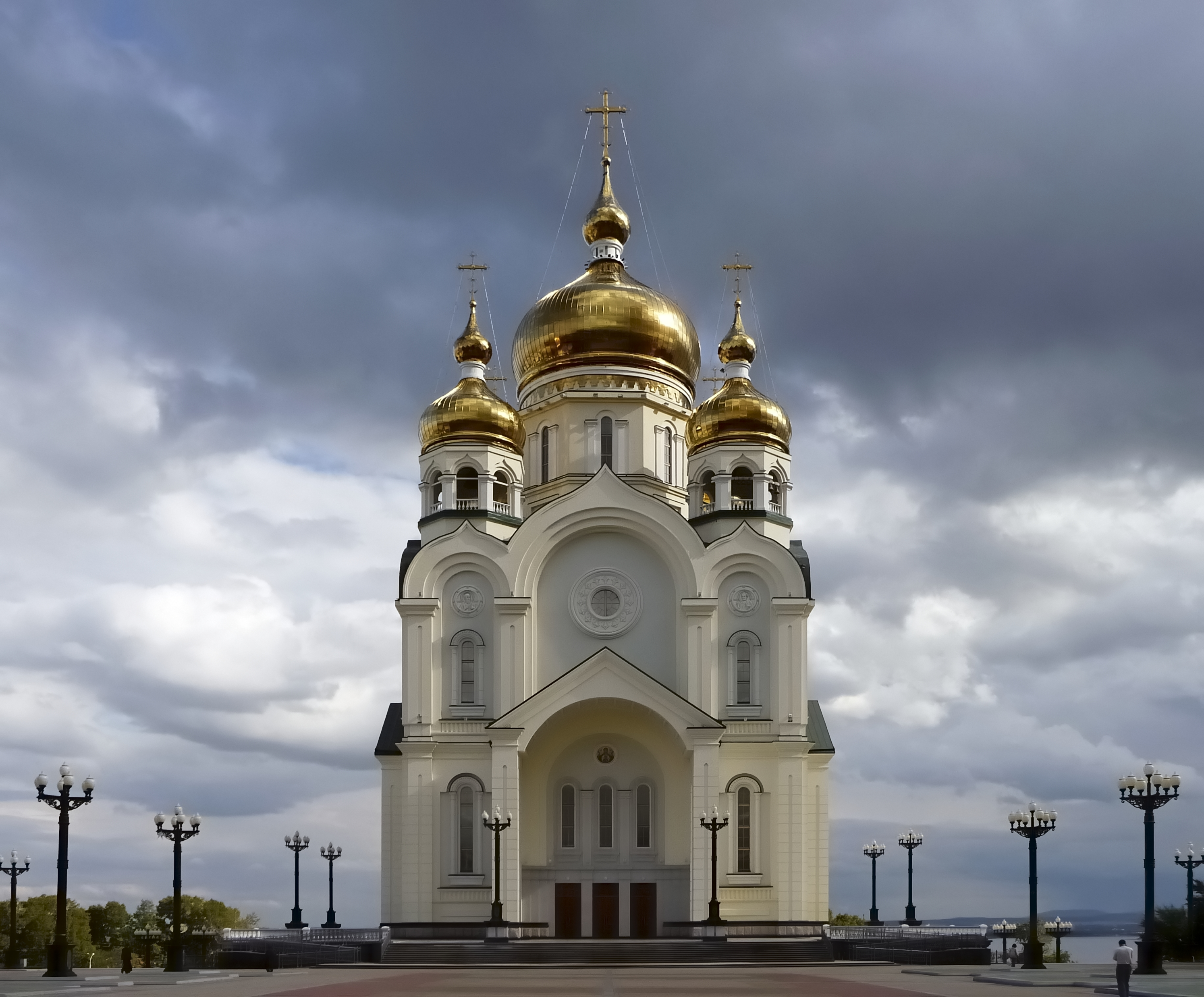
Khabarovsk Metropolitan Cathedral

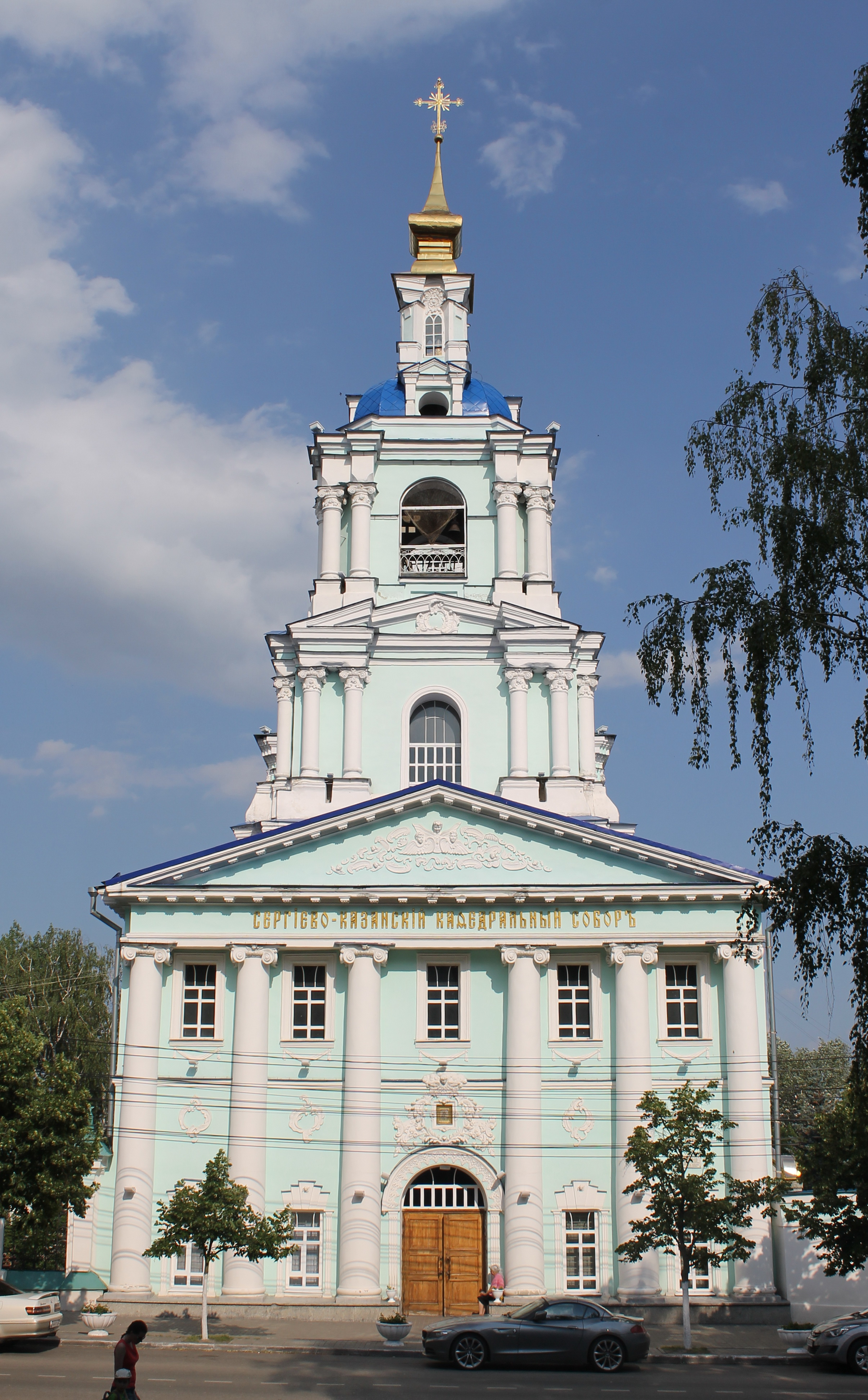
Sergiev-Kazan Cathedral in Kursk

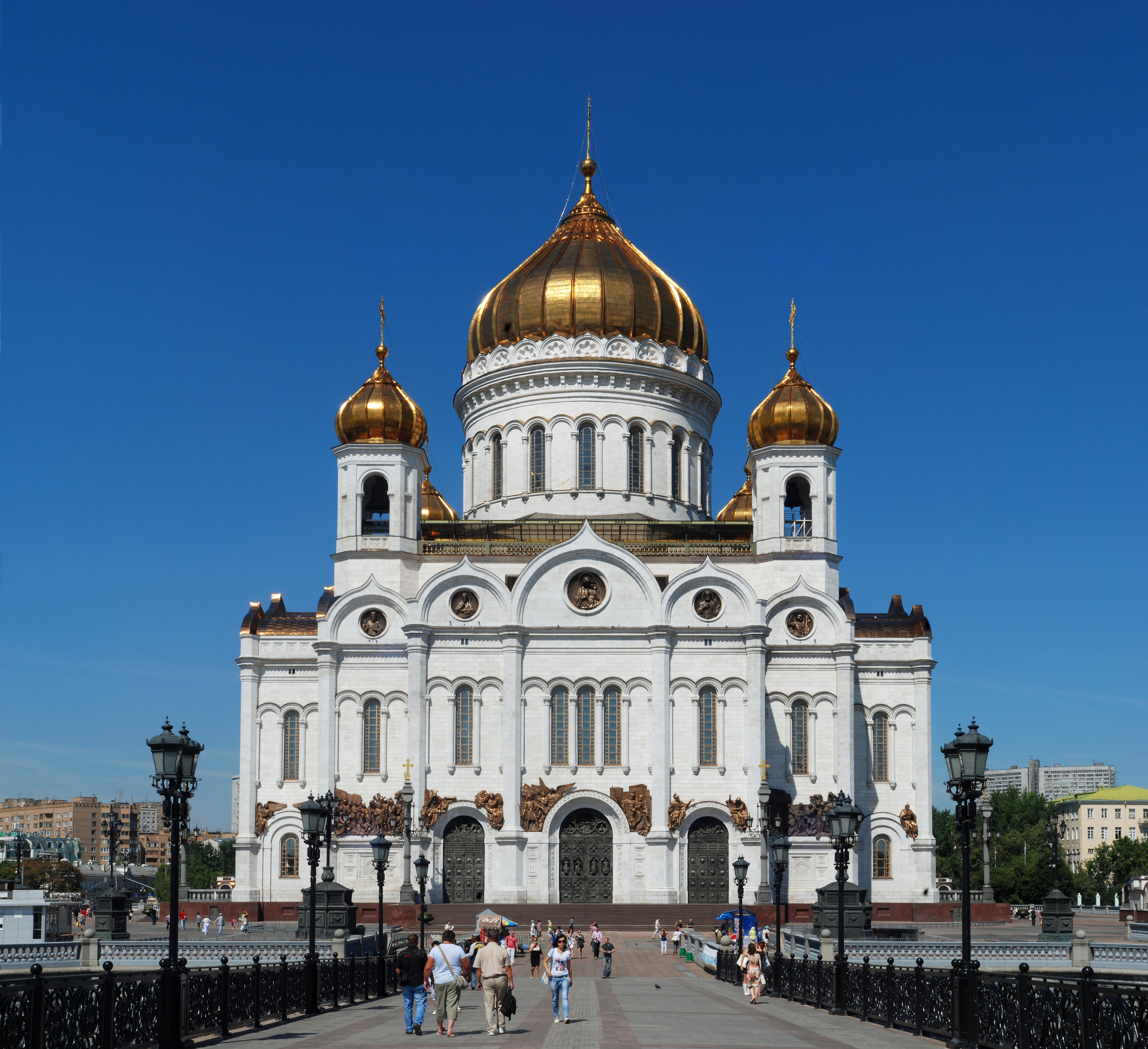
Cathedral of Christ the Saviour in Moscow

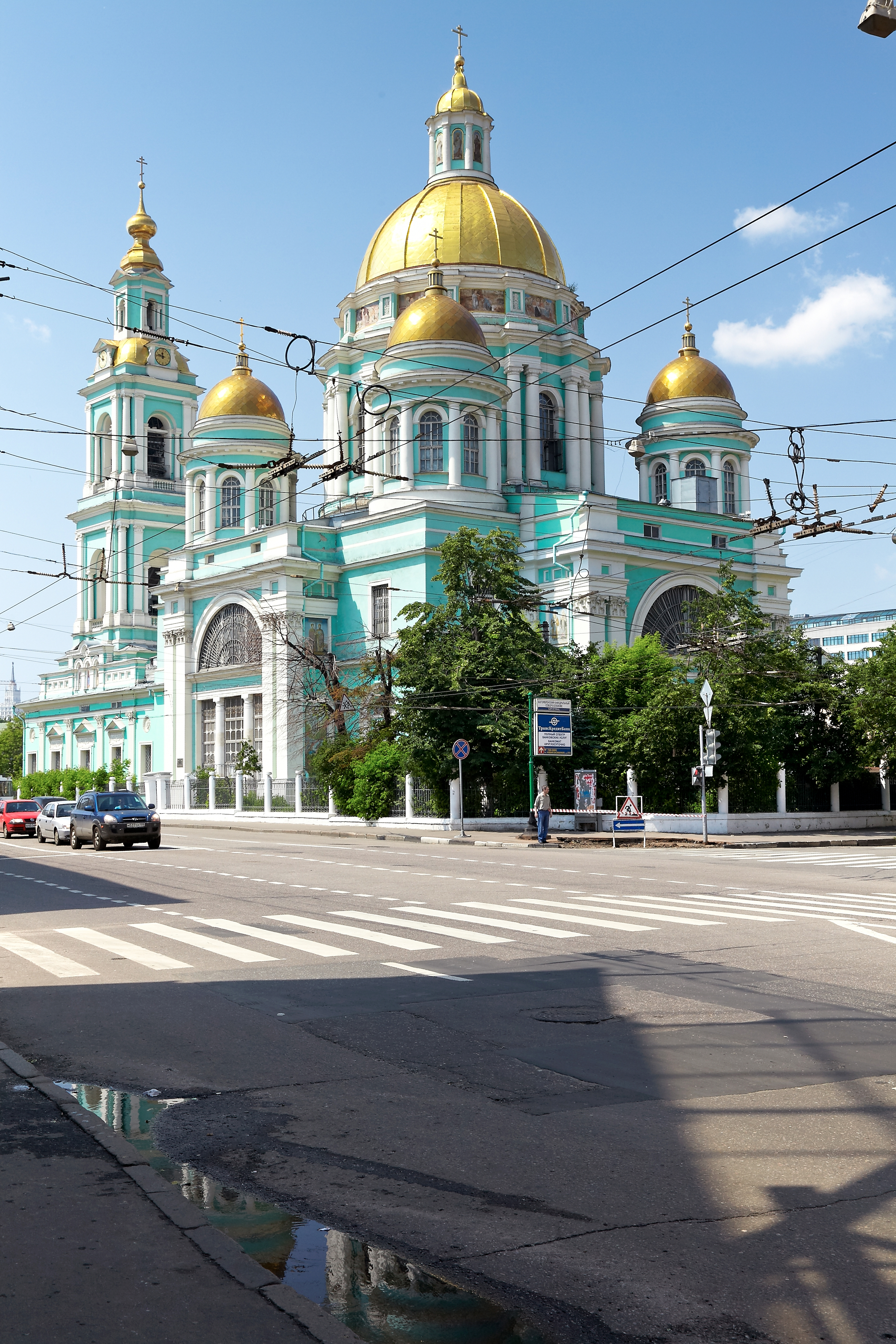
Epiphany Cathedral at Yelokhovo in Moscow

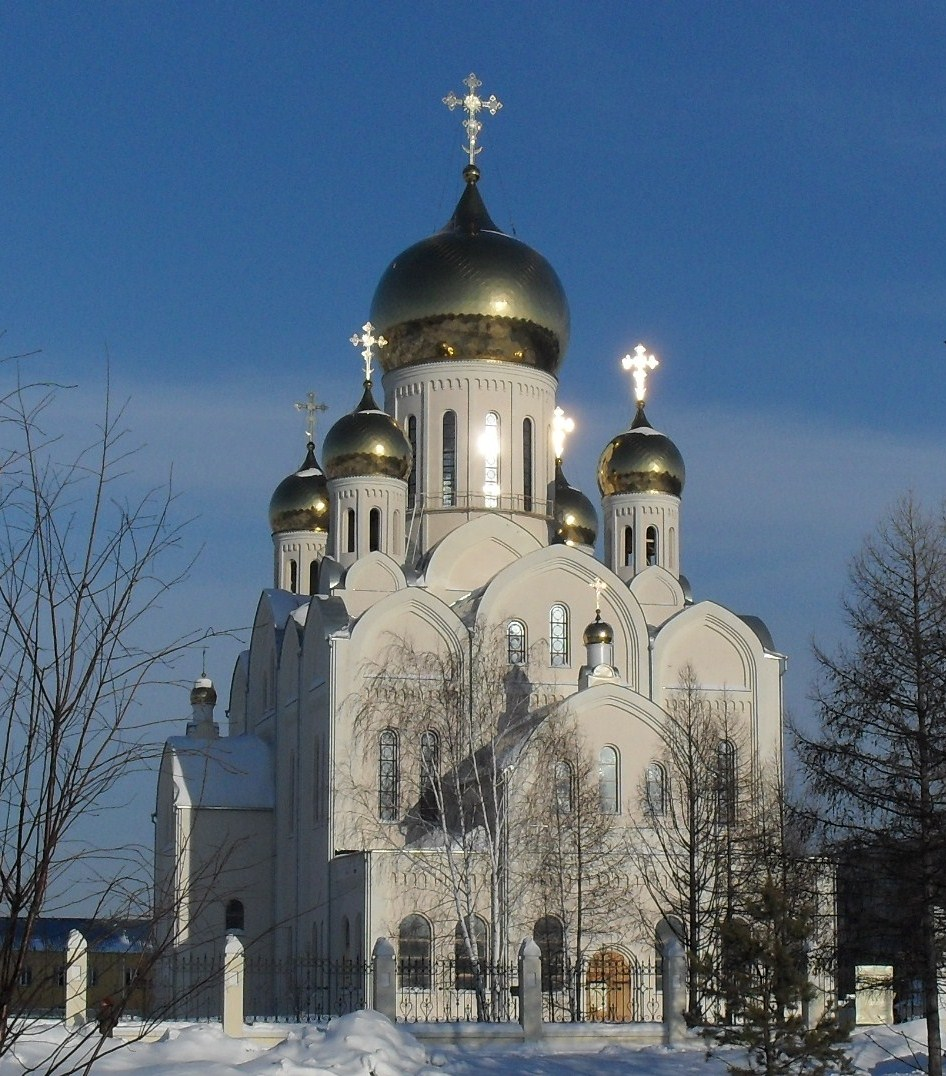
Trinity Cathedral in Novosibirsk

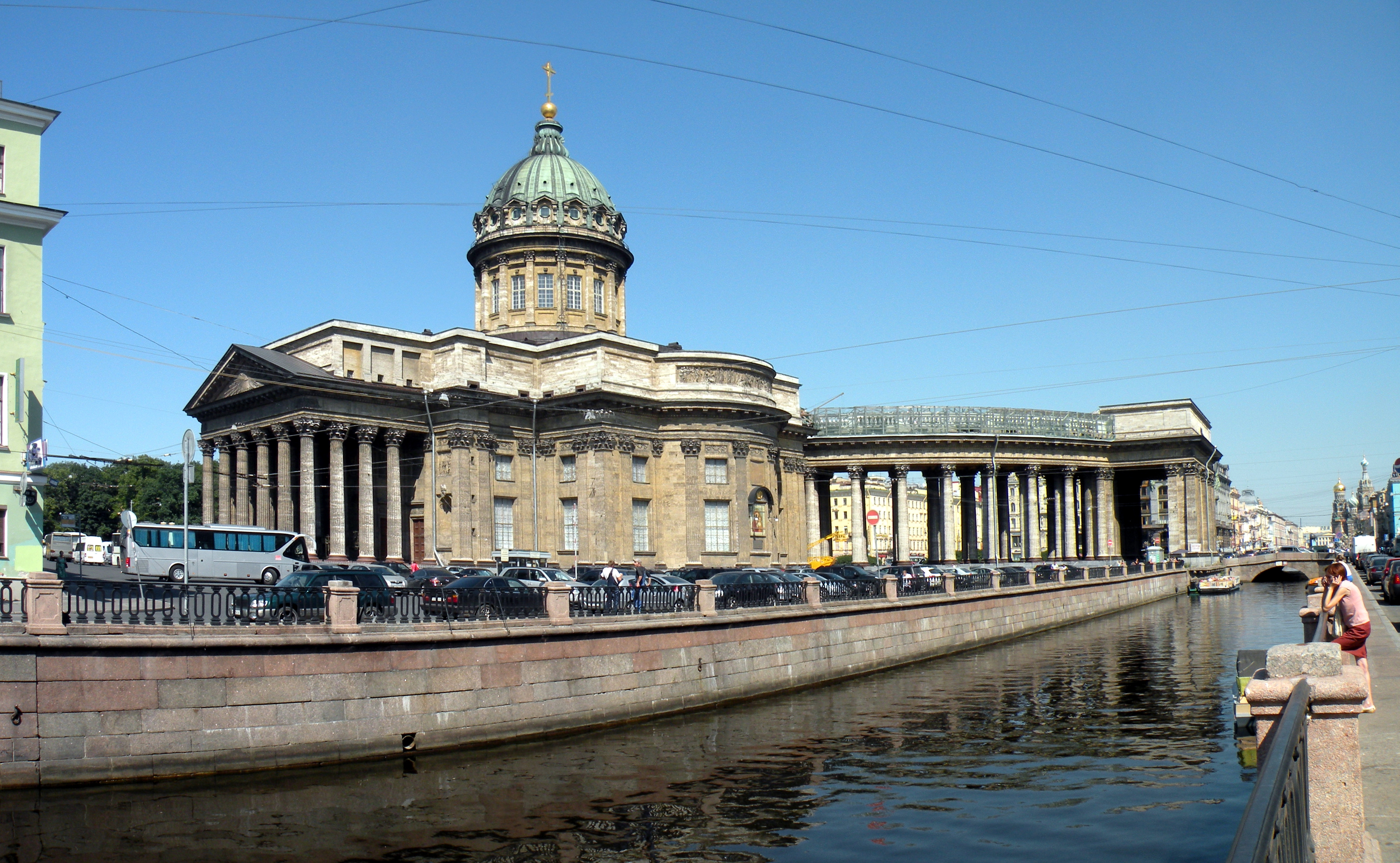
Cathedral of Our Lady of Kazan in Saint Petersburg

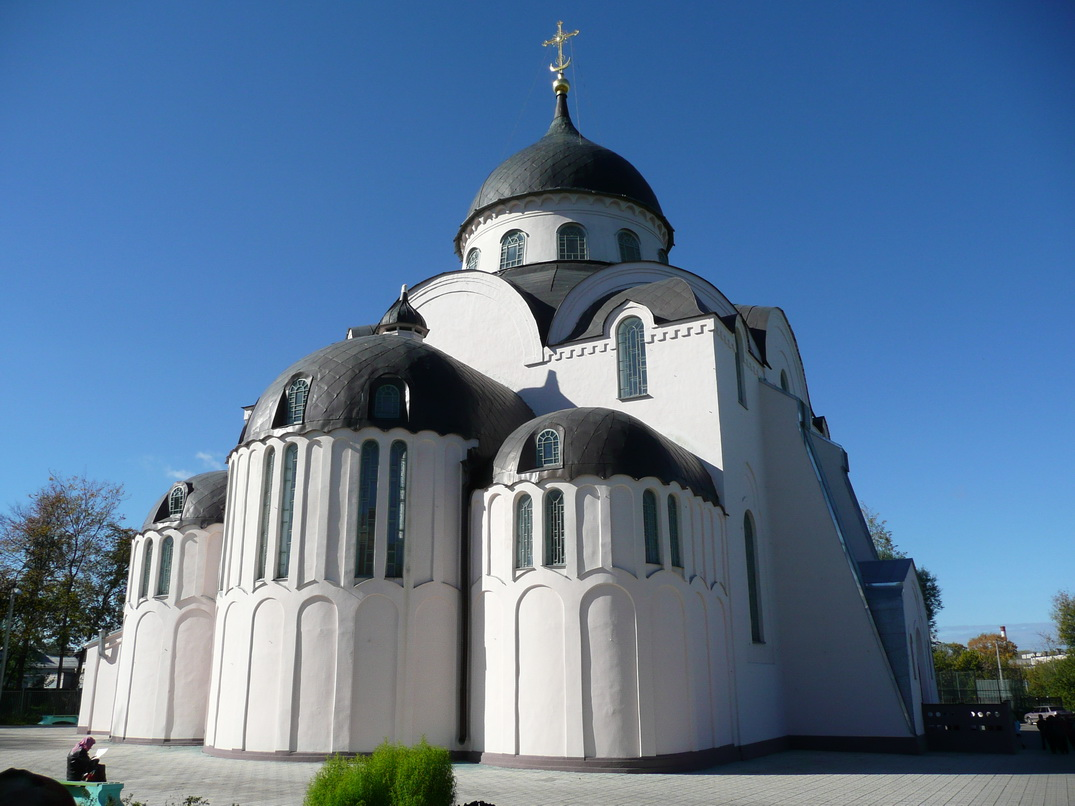
Holy Resurrection Cathedral in Tver

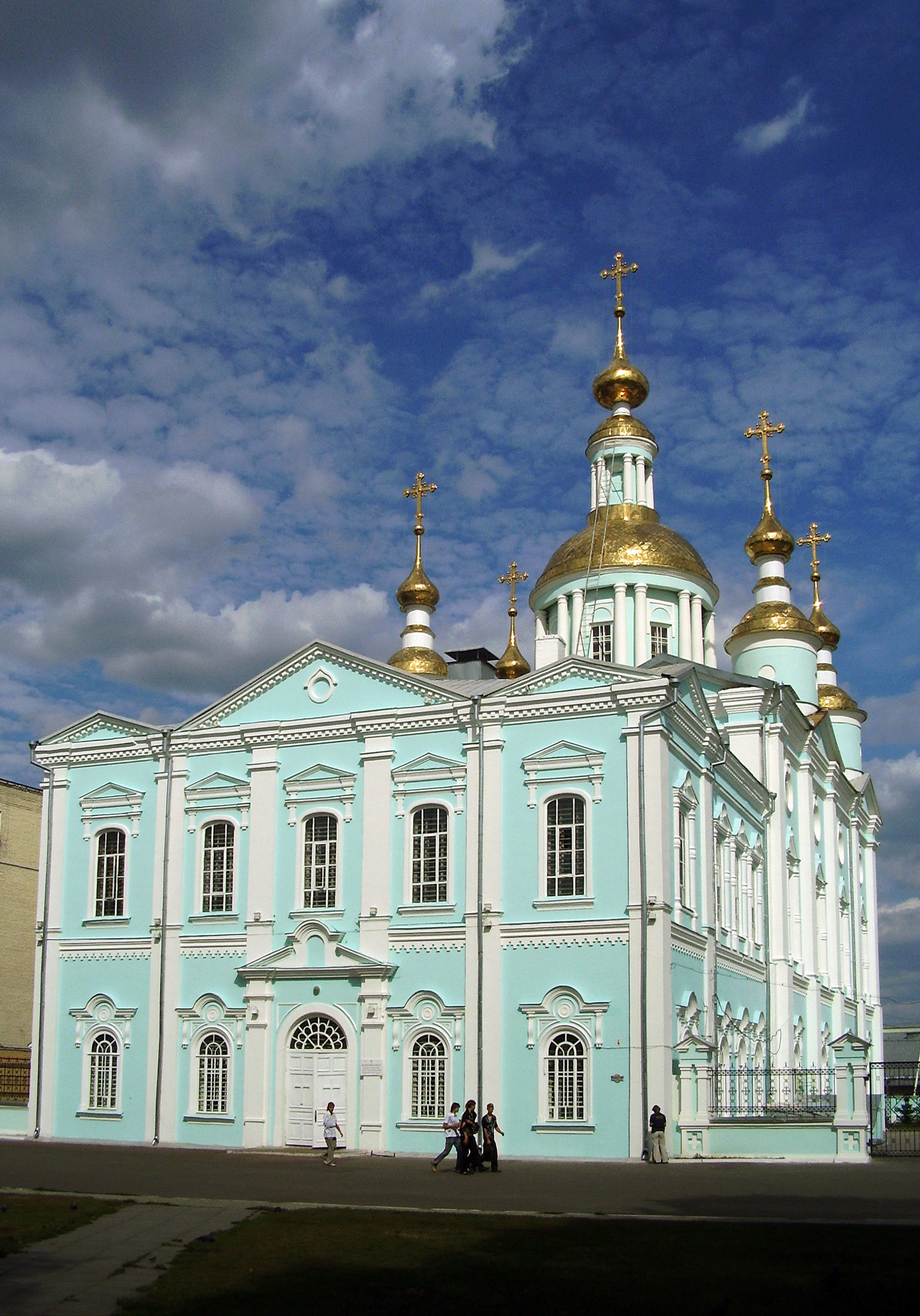
Transfiguration Cathedral in Tambov

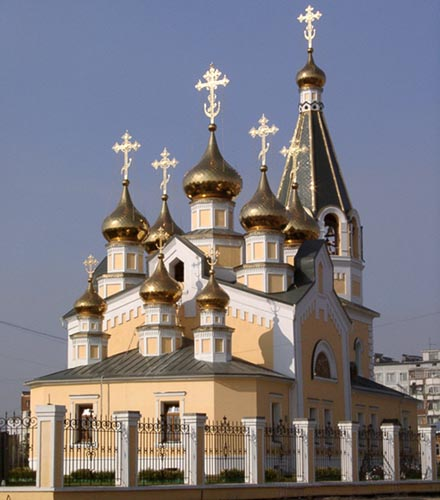
Transfiguration Cathedral in Yakutsk

== Eastern Orthodox ==
Cathedrals of the Russian Orthodox Church

- Transfiguration Cathedral in Abakan
- Cathedral of the Theotokos of Vladimir in Aktubinsk
- Cathedral of the Nativity in Alexandrov
- Trinity Cathedral in Anadyr
- Holy Trinity Co-Cathedral in Angarsk
- St. Iliinsky cathedral in Arkhangelsk
- St. Michael Cathedral in Arkhangelsk (under re-construction)
- Resurrection Cathedral in Arzamas
- Assumption Cathedral in Astrakhan
- Pokrovsky Cathedral in Barnaul
- Cathedral of the Transfiguration in Belgorod
- Transfiguration Co-Cathedral in Berdsk
- Cathedral of the Annunciation in Birobidzhan
- Co-Cathedral of the Assumption in Biysk
- Annunciation Cathedral in Blagoveshchensk
- Co-Cathedral of the Annunciation in Borovsk
- Cathedral of the Bryansk Saints in Bryansk
- Vvedensky Cathedral in Cheboksary
- St. Simeon Cathedral in Chelyabinsk
- Kazan Cathedral in Chita
- Holy Trinity Cathedral in Ekaterinburg
- John the Baptist Co-Cathedral in Ekaterinburg
- Ascension Co-Cathedral in Elets
- Kazan Cathedral in Elista
- Church of Our Lady of Kazan in Irkutsk
- Transfiguration Cathedral in Ivanovo
- St. Alexander Nevsky Cathedral in Izhevsk, built between 1818 and 1823
- Cathedral of Christ the Saviour in Kaliningrad, built between 1995 and 2006
- Trinity Cathedral in Kaluga
- Cathedral of St. Nicholas in Kamyshin
- Cathedral of St. Nicholas in Kazan
- Znamensky Cathedral in Kemerovo
- Dormition Cathedral in Khabarovsk, (former cathedral)
- Transfiguration Cathedral in Khabarovsk, (current cathedral)
- Co-Cathedral of the Assumption of Virgin in Kineshma
- Cathedral of Our Lady of Kazan (Kirillov) in Kirillov
- Dormition Cathedral of the Trifonov Monastery in Kirov
- Cathedral of Sts. Peter and Paul in Klintsy
- Bogoyavlensko-Anastasiin Cathedral in Kostroma
- St. Catherine's Cathedral in Krasnodar
- St. Basil's Cathedral in Krasnoyarsk
- Alexander Nevsky Cathedral in Kurgan
- Sergiev-Kazan Cathedral in Kursk
- Ascension Co-Cathedral in Kuznetsk
- Nativity of Christ Cathedral in Lipetsk
- Holy Spirit Cathedral in Magadan
- Holy Assumption Co-Cathedral in Makhachkala
- Holy Assumption Cathedral in Maykop
- Bogolyubskii Cathedral in Michurinsk
- Ascension Co-Cathedral in Monchegorsk
- Cathedral of Christ the Savior in Moscow, originally built between 1839 and 1860, destroyed in 1931, rebuilt between 1994 and 2000
- Epiphany Cathedral at Yelokhovo in Moscow
- Main Cathedral of the Russian Armed Forces in Moscow
- Saint Basil's Cathedral in Moscow
- St. Nicholas Cathedral in Murmansk
- Cathedral of St. Alexander Nevsky in Nizhny Novgorod
- Ascension Co-Cathedral in Novocherkassk
- Transfiguration Co-Cathedral in Novokuznetsk
- Alexander Nevsky Cathedral in Novosibirsk
- Ascension Cathedral in Novosibirsk
- Trinity Cathedral in Novosibirsk
- Assumption Cathedral in Omsk
- Cathedral of St. Nicholas in Orenburg
- Akhtyrsky Cathedral in Oryol
- Assumption Cathedral in Penza
- Holy Trinity Church in Perm
- St. Nicholas Cathedral in Petropavlovsk-Kamchatsky
- Cathedral of Alexander Nevsky in Petrozavodsk
- Holy Trinity Cathedral in Pskov
- Assumption Cathedral in Rostov
- Virgin Mary's Nativity Church in Rostov-on-Don
- Assumption Cathedral in Ryazan
- Nativity of Christ Co-Cathedral in Ryazan
- Cathedral of Our Lady of Kazan in Saint Petersburg
- Holy Trinity Cathedral of the Alexander Nevsky Lavra in Saint Petersburg
- Cathedral of the Protection of the Mother of God in Samara
- Cathedral of St. Feodor Ushakov in Saransk
- Duhososhestvensky Cathedral in Saratov
- St. Nicholas Co-Cathedral in Shadrinsk
- St. Catherine's Co-Cathedral in Slobodskoy
- Assumption Cathedral in Smolensk
- St. Andrew's Cathedral in Stavropol
- Cathedral of St. Nicholas in Sterlitamak
- Virgin Mary's Nativity Co-Cathedral in Suzdal
- Stephan's Cathedral in Syktyvkar
- Transfiguration Cathedral in Tambov
- St. Sophia Cathedral of the Assumption in Tobolsk
- Transfiguration Cathedral in Tolyatti
- Epiphany Cathedral in Tomsk
- All Saints Cathedral in Tula
- Znamensky Co-Cathedral in Tyumen
- Alexander Nevsky Cathedral in Tver
- Holy Resurrection Cathedral in Tver
- Holy Life-Giving and Indivisible Trinity Co-Cathedral in Tynda
- Sergievsky Cathedral in Ufa
- Odigitrievsky Cathedral in Ulan-Ude
- Virgin-Neopalimovskiy Cathedral in Ulyanovsk
- St. Sophia Cathedral in Veliky Novgorod
- Co-Cathedral of the Holy Righteous Procopius in Veliky Ustyug
- St. George's Co-Cathedral in Vladikavkaz
- Holy Assumption Cathedral in Vladimir
- St. Nicholas Cathedral in Vladivostok
- Cathedral of Our Lady of Kazan in Volgograd
- Cathedral of the Nativity of the Virgin in Vologda
- Cathedral of the Annunciation in Voronezh
- Transfiguration Cathedral in Yakutsk
- Assumption Cathedral in Yaroslavl
- Holy Resurrection Cathedral Yuzhno-Sakhalinsk
- Ascension Cathedral in Yoshkar-Ola

== Catholic ==
Cathedrals of the Catholic Church in Russia:

- Cathedral of the Immaculate Heart of Mary in Irkutsk
- Cathedral of the Mother of God in Moscow
- Cathedral of Transfiguration in Novosibirsk
- Cathedral of St. Peter and St. Paul in Saratov
- Church of St. James in Yuzhno-Sakhalinsk

== Armenian Apostolic ==
Cathedrals of the Armenian Apostolic Church:

- Cathedral of St. Sergius in Sochi

== See also ==
- Lists of cathedrals by country
- Christianity in Russia
