= Khabarovsk Cathedral =

Khabarovsk Cathedral may refer to:

- Khabarovsk Metropolitan Cathedral
- Khabarovsk City Cathedral
