= St. Georges Church Kvirike =

Church in Kvirike, Georgia

St. George’s Church
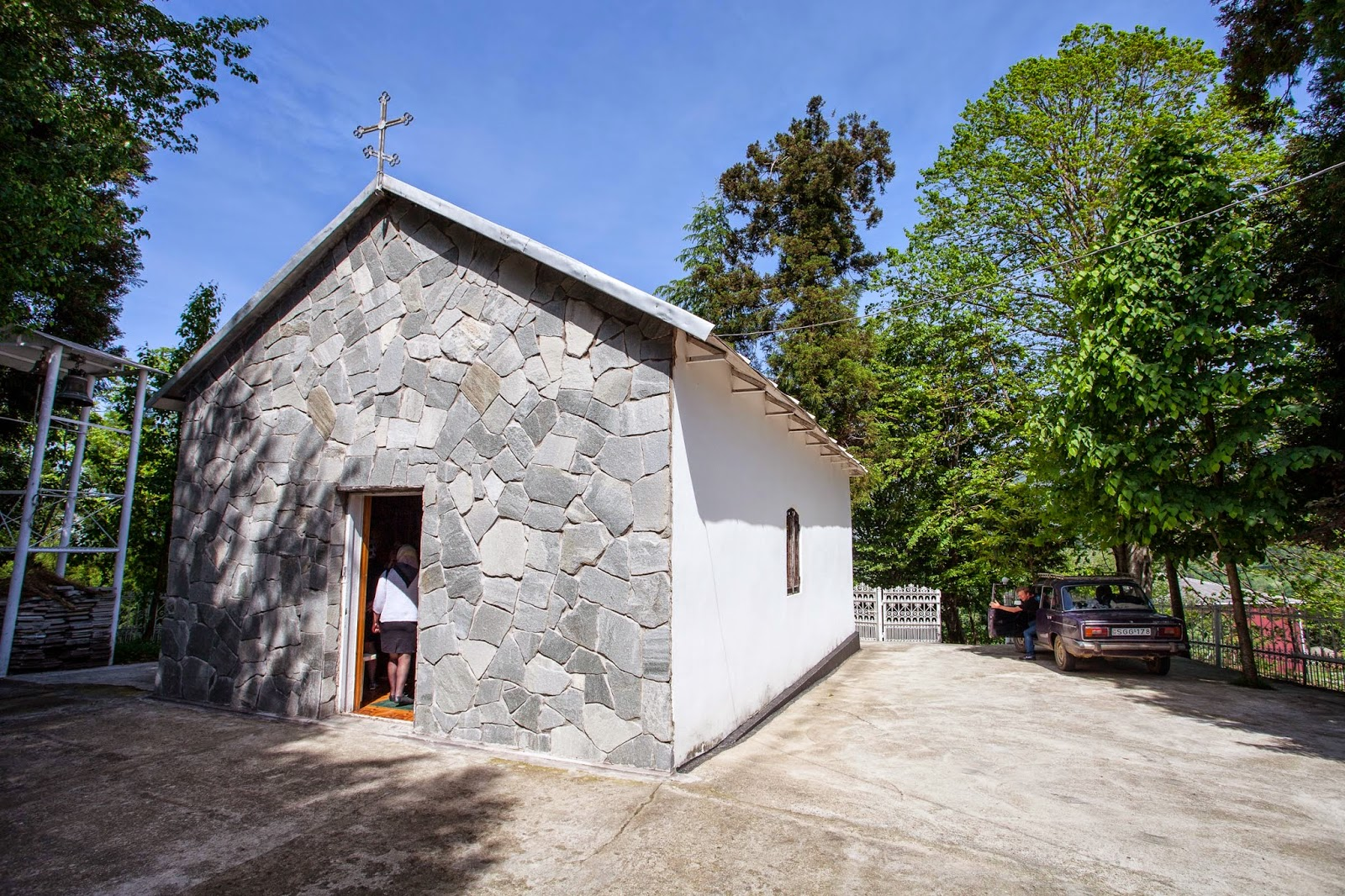
- წმინდა გიორგის ეკლესია. კვირიკე.ქობულეთი.

- Location within Adjara Location within Georgia

Religion
- Affiliation: Georgian Orthodox
- District: Kobuleti Municipality
- Province: Adjara
- Ecclesiastical or organisational status: Patriarchal cathedral
- Leadership: Ilia II of Georgia
- Year consecrated: 12th century

Location
- Location: (Georgia (country)) Adjara, Georgia
- Coordinates: 41°45′58″N 41°50′18″E

Architecture
- Type: Church
- Style: Triple-nave basilica
- Completed: 20th century

St. George's Church (Georgian: წმინდა გიორგის სახელობის ეკლესია) is located in the village of Kvirike, Georgia. It is the new church rebuilt by local Greeks on the site of old ruins of the 12th century. The church houses the miraculous icon of St. George. The day of the temple is celebrated on 16 November.

== See also ==
- List of tallest churches
- List of large Orthodox cathedrals
