= 1987 in Soviet football =

Football in the Soviet Union
- Season: 1987

Men's football
- Top League: Spartak Moscow
- First League: Chernomorets Odessa
- Second League: Tavriya Simferopol (Finals 1); Zvezda Perm (Finals 2); Kuban Krasnodar (Finals 3)
- Soviet Cup: Dinamo Kiev

The 1987 Soviet football championship was the 56th seasons of competitive football in the Soviet Union. Spartak Moscow won the Top League championship becoming the Soviet domestic champions for the eleventh time.

== Honours ==
Competition		Winner	Runner-up
Top League		Spartak Moscow (11)	Dnepr Dnepropetrovsk
First League		Chernomorets Odessa (3)	Lokomotiv Moscow
Second League	Finals 1	Tavriya Simferopol	Iskra Smolensk
Second League	Group 2	Zvezda Perm	Meliorator Chimkent
Second League	Group 3	Kuban Krasnodar	Nistru Kishinev
Soviet Cup		Dinamo Kiev (8)	Dinamo Minsk

Notes = Number in parentheses is the times that club has won that honour. * indicates new record for competition

== Soviet Union football championship ==
=== Top League ===
Pos	Team	Pld	W	D	L	GF	GA	GD	Pts	Qualification or relegation
1	(Russian Soviet Federative Socialist Republic) Spartak Moscow (C)	30	16	11	3	49	26	+23	42 (Note: 1 point deducted (10 draw limited))	Qualification for European Cup first round
2	(Ukrainian Soviet Socialist Republic) Dnepr Dnepropetrovsk	30	15	9	6	42	22	+20	39	Qualification for UEFA Cup first round
3	(Lithuanian Soviet Socialist Republic) Žalgiris Vilnius	30	14	8	8	43	29	+14	36	Qualification for UEFA Cup first round
4	(Russian Soviet Federative Socialist Republic) Torpedo Moscow	30	12	12	6	35	25	+10	34 (Note: 2 points deducted (10 draw limited))	Qualification for UEFA Cup first round
5	(Byelorussian Soviet Socialist Republic) Dinamo Minsk	30	12	9	9	33	25	+8	33	Qualification for UEFA Cup first round
6	(Ukrainian Soviet Socialist Republic) Dynamo Kiev	30	11	10	9	37	27	+10	32	
7	(Ukrainian Soviet Socialist Republic) Shakhtar Donetsk	30	10	10	10	29	31	−2	30	
8	(Armenian Soviet Socialist Republic) Ararat Erevan	30	13	3	14	32	45	−13	29	
9	(Azerbaijan Soviet Socialist Republic) Neftchi Baku	30	9	10	11	33	30	+3	28	
10	(Russian Soviet Federative Socialist Republic) Dinamo Moscow	30	9	11	10	27	30	−3	28	
11	(Ukrainian Soviet Socialist Republic) Metalist Kharkov	30	10	7	13	23	32	−9	27	Qualification for Cup Winners' Cup first round
12	(Kazakh Soviet Socialist Republic) Kairat Alma-Ata	30	10	6	14	27	38	−11	26	
13	(Georgian Soviet Socialist Republic) Dinamo Tbilisi	30	9	7	14	31	40	−9	25	
14	(Russian Soviet Federative Socialist Republic) Zenit Leningrad	30	7	10	13	25	37	−12	24	
15	(Russian Soviet Federative Socialist Republic) CSKA Moscow (R)	30	7	11	12	26	35	−9	24	Relegation to First League
16	(Georgian Soviet Socialist Republic) Guria Lanchkhuti (R)	30	5	8	17	18	38	−20	18	Relegation to First League

Source: rsssf.com
(C) Champions; (R) Relegated

=== First League ===
Pos	Team	Pld	W	D	L	GF	GA	GD	Pts	Promotion or relegation
1	(Ukrainian Soviet Socialist Republic) Chernomorets Odessa (C, P)	42	25	12	5	68	31	+37	62	Promotion to Top League
2	(Russian Soviet Federative Socialist Republic) Lokomotiv Moscow (P)	42	23	13	6	59	26	+33	58 (Note: There was a draw limit for the draws earned, 12. Only twelve draws earn a point, in contrast, over the limit draws earn no points. Note that this year Fakel was forced to relegation because of this rule.)	Promotion to Top League
3	(Latvian Soviet Socialist Republic) Daugava Riga	42	19	15	8	65	35	+30	50	
4	(Tajik Soviet Socialist Republic) Pamir Dushanbe	42	19	8	15	55	45	+10	46	
5	(Ukrainian Soviet Socialist Republic) SKA Karpaty Lvov	42	17	12	13	62	46	+16	46	
6	(Russian Soviet Federative Socialist Republic) Kuzbass Kemerevo	42	16	14	12	46	36	+10	44	
7	(Uzbek Soviet Socialist Republic) Pakhtakor Tashkent	42	16	12	14	47	44	+3	44	
8	(Ukrainian Soviet Socialist Republic) Kolos Nikopol	42	15	10	17	58	63	−5	40	
9	(Ukrainian Soviet Socialist Republic) Metallurg Zaporozhia	42	14	12	16	54	53	+1	40	
10	(Russian Soviet Federative Socialist Republic) Rostselmash Rostov-on-Don	42	14	13	15	49	55	−6	40	
11	(Russian Soviet Federative Socialist Republic) SKA Rostov-on-Don	42	16	7	19	40	56	−16	39	
12	(Russian Soviet Federative Socialist Republic) Geolog Tyumen	42	15	9	18	45	54	−9	39	
13	(Armenian Soviet Socialist Republic) Kotayk Abovyan	42	15	8	19	55	59	−4	38	
14	(Russian Soviet Federative Socialist Republic) Shinnik Yaroslavl	42	15	8	19	26	42	−16	38	
15	(Russian Soviet Federative Socialist Republic) Dynamo Stavropol	42	13	15	14	46	52	−6	38	
16	(Ukrainian Soviet Socialist Republic) Zarya Voroshilovgrad	42	13	15	14	46	60	−14	38	
17	(Russian Soviet Federative Socialist Republic) Rotor Volgograd	42	13	10	19	45	50	−5	36	
18	(Russian Soviet Federative Socialist Republic) Spartak Ordjonikidze	42	12	12	18	37	46	−9	36	
19	(Georgian Soviet Socialist Republic) Dinamo Batumi	42	12	11	19	38	45	−7	35	
20	(Russian Soviet Federative Socialist Republic) Fakel Voronezh (R)	42	11	16	15	35	37	−2	34	Relegation to Second League
21	(Georgian Soviet Socialist Republic) Torpedo Kutaisi (R)	42	11	12	19	30	51	−21	34	Relegation to Second League
22	(Russian Soviet Federative Socialist Republic) Krylya Sovetov Kuybyshev (R)	42	10	12	20	40	60	−20	32	Relegation to Second League

(C) Champions; (P) Promoted; (R) Relegated

=== Group 1 ===
Pos	Rep	Team	Pld	W	D	L	GF	GA	GD	Pts	Promotion
1	UKR	Tavria Simferopol	4	2	1	1	15	7	+8	5	Promoted
2	RUS	Iskra Smolensk	4	2	1	1	7	8	−1	5	
3	GEO	Lokomotiv Samtredia	4	1	0	3	5	12	−7	2	

=== Group 2 ===
Pos	Rep	Team	Pld	W	D	L	GF	GA	GD	Pts	Promotion
1	RUS	Zvezda Perm	4	3	1	0	6	2	+4	7	Promoted
2	KAZ	Meliorator Chimkent	4	1	1	2	4	5	−1	3	
3	RUS	SKA Khabarovsk	4	0	2	2	1	4	−3	2	

=== Group 3 ===
Pos	Rep	Team	Pld	W	D	L	GF	GA	GD	Pts	Promotion
1	RUS	Kuban Krasnodar	4	2	1	1	7	3	+4	5	Promoted
2	MDA	Nistru Kishinev	4	2	0	2	5	3	+2	4	
3	UZB	Neftyanik Fergana	4	1	1	2	2	8	−6	3	

Source: rsssf.com

=== Top goalscorers ===
Top League

- Oleh Protasov (Dnepr Dnepropetrovsk) – 18 goals

First League

- Viktor Pimushin (Kuzbass Kemerovo) – 23 goals
