= Pleshakov =

Pleshakov (masculine, Russian: Плешаков) or Pleshakova (feminine, Russian: Плешакова) is a Russian surname. Notable people with the surname include:

- Alexey Pleshakov (born 1954), Russian politician
- Sergei Pleshakov (born 1957), Russian field hockey player, twin brother of Vladimir
- Vladimir Pleshakov (born 1957), Russian field hockey player, twin brother of Sergei
- Yuriy Pleshakov (born 1988), Ukrainian–Russian soccer player
