= Mitrophan of Voronezh =

Saint Metrophanes of Voronezh
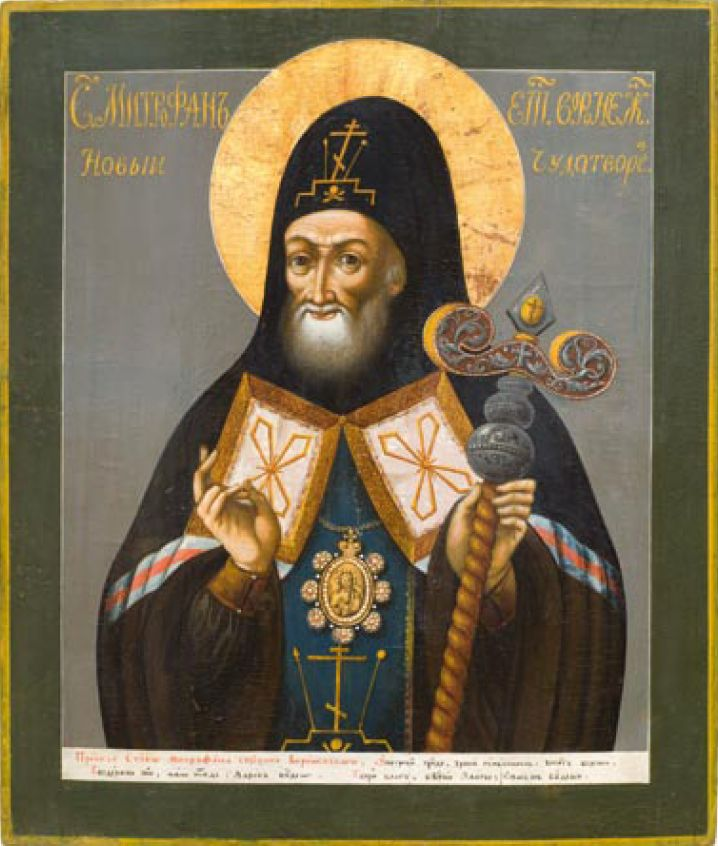
- 19th century icon of Saint Metrophanes

Bishop
- Born: November 8, 1623
- Died: November 23, 1703
- Venerated in: Eastern Orthodox Church
- Canonized: June 25, 1832 by Nicholas I of Russia
- Feast: 7 August (finding of his relics), 4 September (second finding of his relics)
- Patronage: Voronezh Oblast; Teykovsky District; children, statesmen

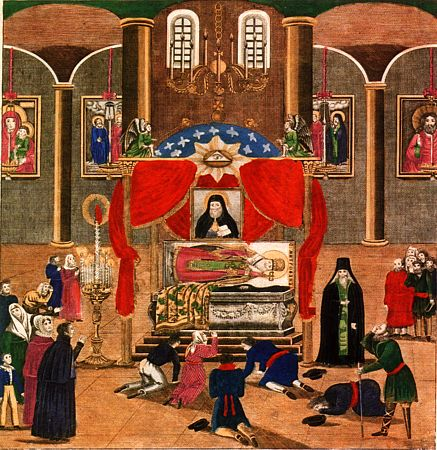
The Ceremonial Opening of the Relics of Bishop Mitrofan in the Town of Voronezh on August 6th 1832

Mitrophan or Mitrofan of Voronezh (Russian transliteration) or Metrophanes of Voronezh (English name) (1623 - 1703) was appointed in 1682 the first bishop of Voronezh. He is reputed to have possessed miracle-working powers.

Mikhail (as he was then known) was born in the village of Antilokhovo, Savinsky District and took monastic vows after his wife's death in 1663. He managed the Kosmin Monastery near Yuryev-Polsky and the Unzha Monastery in Makaryev before being promoted to a bishop's see in 1682. He supported Peter the Great in his efforts to build the first Russian warships in Voronezh but was generally critical of his Westernization policies.

Mitrofan was buried in the Annunciation Monastery in the Tsar's presence in 1703. When 14 years later his tomb was opened, Mitrofan's body was found to be "whole" and his relics were proclaimed to have healing powers. After he was formally canonized in 1832 and Nicholas I paid a visit to his shrine, his fame increased and large numbers of pilgrims from Central Russia started flocking to his tomb in Voronezh. The first Moscow church in his name was consecrated in 1895.

The Bolsheviks had Mitrofan's relics confiscated. It was in 1989 that the relics were returned to the Russian Orthodox Church. There is an ornate statue of Saint Mitrofan in front of the Annunciation Cathedral where his relics have been kept since then.
