= Ugresha Monastery =

Coordinates: 55°37′18″N 37°50′24″E

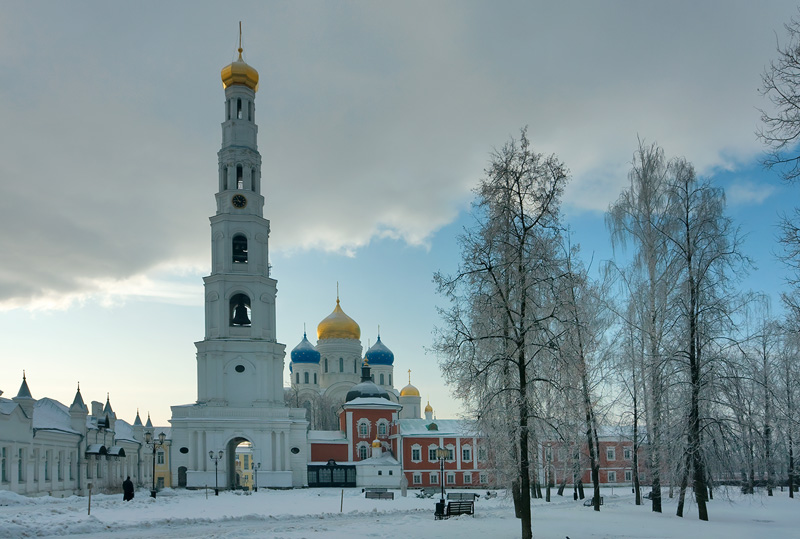
Monastery of St. Nicholas has one of the tallest bell towers in the Orthodox world

Nikolo-Ugreshsky Monastery (Russian: Николо-Угрешский монастырь) is a walled stauropegic Russian Orthodox monastery of St. Nicholas the Miracle-Worker located in a suburb of Moscow, Dzerzhinsky. It is the town's main landmark and is featured on the city emblem.

The monastery is known to have existed as early as 1521, when the Tatar horde of Mehmed I Giray reduced the city to ashes. The old katholikon of St. Nicholas (later destroyed by the Soviets) was built in the 16th century. The Ugresha Monastery was one of the walled abbeys defending approaches to the Russian capital from the south.

A late legend attributes its foundation to Dmitry Donskoy who, on his way to the Kulikovo Field, is supposed to have made a stay there and determined to give a decisive battle to the Tatars after seeing an image of St. Nicholas in a pious dream. He "is reputed to have called out in ecstasy ugresha ("this sets my heart aflame") and founded a monastery on the very spot".

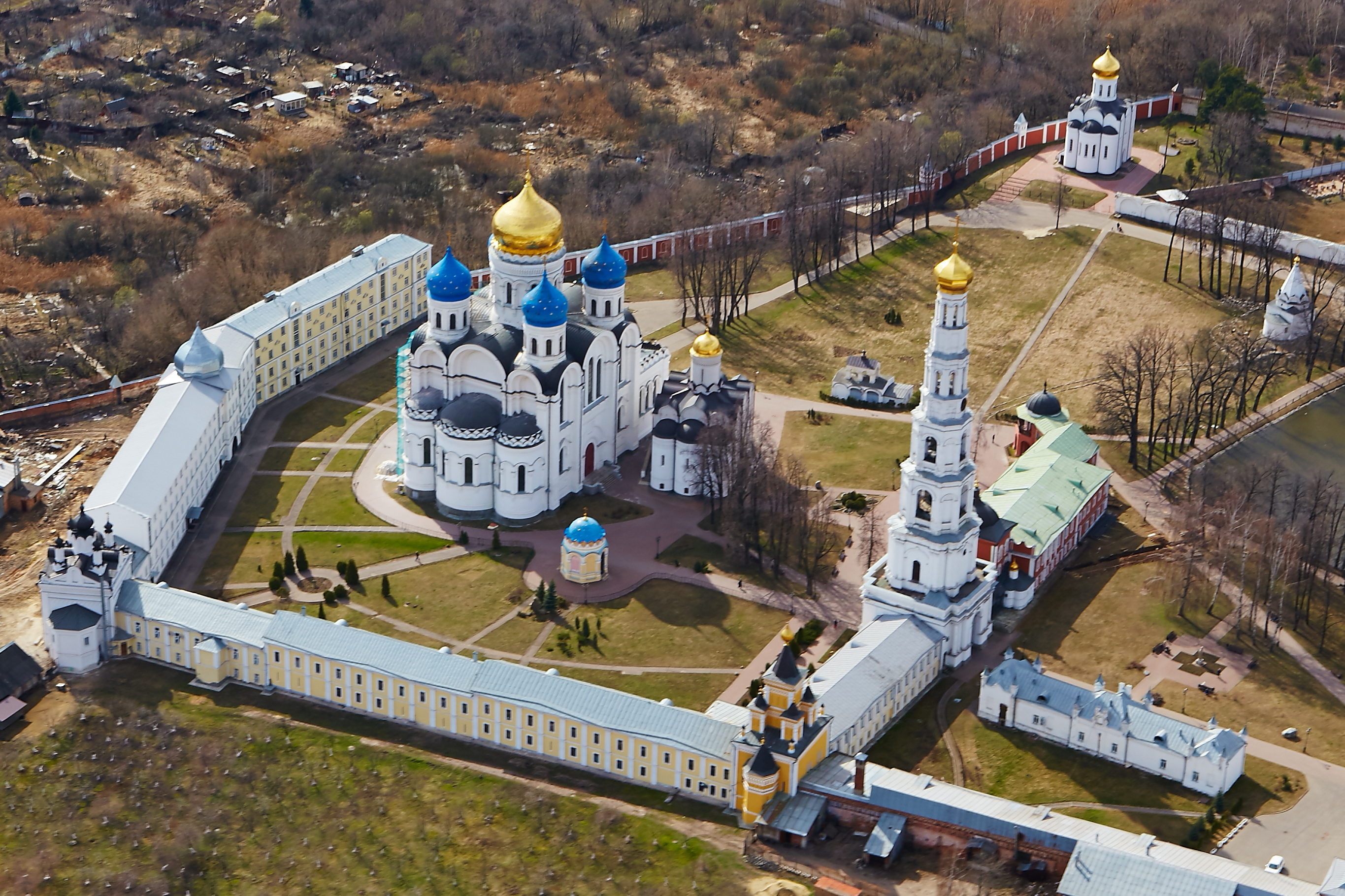
A bird's-eye view of St. Nicholas' Monastery

The monastery was greatly expanded in the 17th century due to its proximity to the royal residences in Izmailovo and Kolomenskoye.

After the Russian Revolution, the monastery was closed and its grounds were given over to a children's colony of the People's Commissariat of Finance in 1920. In an effort to fight children homelessness, Felix Dzerzhinsky had it transformed into a labour commune. The town was later renamed after Dzerzhinsky. Many church buildings were destroyed; others survived in a state of great disrepair. The ruined buildings were returned to the Russian Orthodox Church in 1991. The monastery has since been restored and operates several museums, including one dedicated to Nicholas II of Russia. There is a new seminary on the grounds.

== The modern life of the monastic community ==
The monastery was returned to the Russian Orthodox Church on January 30, 1991, by the decision of the Moscow Regional Council. Archimandrite Veniamin (Zaritsky) was appointed the vicar of the monastery. A school at the monastery was opened in 1998 which was reorganised in 1999 into the Nikolo-Ugreshskaya Theological Seminary.

In 2004 a hipped-roof church-chapel in honour of the Passion of Christ was completed. In the same year, a new iconostasis was made in the Transfiguration Cathedral of the monastery. According to the project of hieromonk Arseniy, the Nikolsky Cathedral was restored (rebuilt).

Since April 2021, the monastery has served as the residence of the metropolitans of Krutitsy and Kolomna, and it houses the administration of the Moscow metropolis and the Kolomna diocese.

== See also ==
- List of largest Eastern Orthodox church buildings
