= Alexey Pleshakov =

Russian politician

Alexey Nikolaevitch Pleshakov (Russian: Алексе́й Никола́евич Плешако́в; born January 1, 1954) was elected as the Head of the local government board of Dzerzhinsky on July 25, 2006, after Victor Dorkin was shot dead in early spring 2006.

== Education and career ==
Pleshakov graduated from Moscow Institute of Chemical Industry in 1976 and was assigned to Lyubertsy Science and Research Institute of Chemical Technology in Dzerzhinsky. He worked on solid-state rocket fuel.

From 1997 to 2005, he worked as the deputy of the Head of the local government board of Dzerzhinsky city for town-planning and municipal housing department. Since September 2005 and until his recent election, directed the department of Moscow region civil engineering ministry where he organized and coordinated construction of sport facilities (Moscow region Governor Program)

He was awarded with the Moscow region Governor Medal "for his unexceptionable service" and with the badge "For the services he rendered for Dzerzhinsky town"

He has 6 inventions, and has had several science publications.

== Personal life ==
Pleshkov is married and has three children.
