= List of largest Eastern Orthodox church buildings =

This is a list of the largest Eastern Orthodox church buildings in the world, based on area and capacity. Any Eastern Orthodox church building that has a capacity of 3,000 people or more, can be added to this page. The church buildings are listed in alphabetical order according to country. The churches are from various jurisdictions of the Eastern Orthodox Church.

== List ==
| Name | Image | Area (m²) | | Gross volume (m³) | Capacity | Built | City | Country | Jurisdiction | Notes |
| Name | Image | Interior | Exterior | Gross volume (m³) | Capacity | Built | City | Country | Jurisdiction | Notes |
|---|---|---|---|---|---|---|---|---|---|---|
| People's Salvation Cathedral | | 8,400 m² | 13,670 m² | 478,857 m³ | 7,000 (Note: The cathedral is projected for 10,000 people in the main cathedral building and underground galleries. A total of 7,000 peoples/worshipers can attend at the holy liturgy in the same time, with 1,000 – choirs (three places), clergy, three levels of balconies right-left, and 6,000 pilgrims. In the underground galleries can be accommodate 3,000 peoples.) | 2010–2025 | Bucharest | Romania | Patriarchate of Romania | The world’s largest, tallest, and longest Eastern Orthodox church building. |
| Saint Isaac's Cathedral (Note: Museum since 1931, partly reopened for services (in side chapels) since 1992) | | 4,000 m² | 7,418 m² | 260,000 m³ | 12,000 | 1818–1858 | Saint Petersburg | Russia | State Russian Museum | Eastern Orthodox church building with the largest footprint. |
| Cathedral of Christ the Saviour | | 3,990 m² (Note: The church covers 3980 m^{2}) | 6,829 m² | 194,900 m³ | 10,000 | 1839–1883, rebuilt 1994–2000 | Moscow | Russia | Moscow Patriarchate | |
| Church of Saint Sava | | 3,650 m² (Note: The church’s official site specifies that the ground floor area amounts to 3,650 m^{2}, combined area of the balconies for the choirs on the second floor is 1,444 m^{2}, while total internal area (without stairs) is 5,094 m^{2}.) | 4,830 m² | 170,000 m³ | 7,000 (Note: The church’s official site specifies that the nave floor can accommodate 7,000 worshippers – more precisely, 6,300 on the nave floor itself and an additional 700 in the choir galleries (balconies). The underground galleries can accommodate a further 3,000 worshippers. The same source also states that the church can accommodate a total of 10,000 worshippers on the nave floor and in the underground galleries. The figure referring to the nave floor alone appears to represent the standard capacity calculation, excluding annexes. By contrast, the total figure of 10,000 may be disputed, as it appears to include annex spaces in order to increase the overall capacity estimate.) | 1935–2020 | Belgrade | Serbia | Serbian Patriarchate | |
| Kazan Cathedral | | 4,000 m² | | | 6,000 | 1811 | Saint Petersburg | Russia | Moscow Patriarchate | |
| Trinity Izmailovsky Cathedral | | 3,500 m² | | | 3,000 | 1835 | Saint Petersburg | Russia | Moscow Patriarchate | |
| Holy Trinity Cathedral of Tbilisi | | 3,000 m² | | 137,000 m³ | 10,000 | 1995-2004 | Tbilisi | (Georgia (country)) Georgia | Patriarchate of Georgia | |
| Novocherkassk Ascension Cathedral | | 2,988 m² | | 135,000 m³ | 5,000 | 1904 | Novocherkassk | Russia | Moscow Patriarchate | |
| Alexander Nevsky Cathedral | | 3,170 m² | | 86,000 m³ | 5,000 | 1882-1912 | Sofia | Bulgaria | Patriarchate of Bulgaria | |
| Transfiguration Cathedral | | 3,100 m² | | | 9,000 | 1837, rebuilt 2003 | Odesa | Ukraine | Moscow Patriarchate | Severely damaged by a Russian missile attack on 23 July 2023. |
| Smolny Convent | | 3,000 m² | | | 6,000 | 1764 | Saint Petersburg | Russia | Moscow Patriarchate | |
| Kronstadt Naval Cathedral | | 3,000 m² | | | 5,000 | 1913 | Kronstadt | Russia | Moscow Patriarchate | |
| Saint Sophia Cathedral | | 2,276 m² | | | | 1011 | Kyiv | Ukraine | Orthodox Church of Ukraine | |
| Church of Saint Panteleimon | | 2,068 m² | | | 5,000 | 1930 | Athens | Greece | Greek Orthodox Church | |
| Annunciation Cathedral | | 2,000 m² | | | 5,000 | 1901 | Kharkiv | Ukraine | Ukrainian Orthodox Church | |
| Saint Andrew of Patras | | 2,600 m² | | | 7,000 | 1908–1974 | Patras | Greece | Greek Orthodox Church | |
| Cathedral of the Lord's Ascension | | 1,706 m² | | | 5,000 | 2017 | Bacău | Romania | Patriarchate of Romania | |
| Resurrection Cathedral | | 1,772 m² | | | 5,000 | 2014 | Tirana | Albania | Albanian Orthodox Church | |
| Dormition of the Mother of God Cathedral | | 1,629 m² | | | | 1886 | Varna | Bulgaria | Patriarchate of Bulgaria | |
| Timișoara Orthodox Cathedral | | 1,542 m² | | 50,000 m³ | 5,000 | 1940 | Timișoara | Romania | Patriarchate of Romania | |
| Alexander Nevsky Cathedral | | 1,450 m² | | | 4,000 | 1900 | Tallinn | Estonia | Moscow Patriarchate | |
| Agios Minas Cathedral | | 1,350 m² | | | 3,000 | 1895 | Heraklion | Greece | Greek Orthodox Church | |
| Dormition of the Theotokos Cathedral | | 1,320 m² | | | 3,000 | 1933 | Cluj-Napoca | Romania | Patriarchate of Romania | |
| Church of Saint Mark | | 1,150 m² | | | 3,000 | 1940 | Belgrade | Serbia | Serbian Patriarchate | |
| Saints Boris and Gleb Cathedral | | 1,100 m² | | | 3,000 | 1905 | Daugavpils | Latvia | Moscow Patriarchate | |
| Poti Cathedral | | 1,000 m² | | | 3,000 | 1906 | Poti | (Georgia (country)) Georgia | Patriarchate of Georgia | |
| Uspenski Cathedral | | 1,000 m² | | | | 1868 | Helsinki | Finland | Finnish Orthodox Church | |
| St. Michael's Cathedral | | | | | 12,000 | 2000 | Cherkasy | Ukraine | Orthodox Church of Ukraine | |
| Church of the Holy Sepulchre | | | | | 10,000 | 326 | Jerusalem | Israel (de facto) | Patriarchate of Jerusalem | |
| Transfiguration Cathedral of Ugresha Monastery | | | | | 7,000 | 1894 | Dzerzhinsky, Moscow Oblast | Russia | Moscow Patriarchate | |
| Church of the Nativity of Christ | | | | | 6,875 | 1857 | Kyshtym | Russia | Moscow Patriarchate | |
| St. Nicholas Naval Cathedral | | | | | 5,000 | 1753 | Saint Petersburg | Russia | Moscow Patriarchate | |
| Sophia Cathedral | | | | | 5,000 | 1788 | Saint Petersburg | Russia | Moscow Patriarchate | |
| Uzhhorod Orthodox Cathedral | | | | | 5,000 | 1990 | Uzhhorod | Ukraine | Ukrainian Orthodox Church | |
| Iași Metropolitan Cathedral | | | | | 3,000 | 1887 | Iași | Romania | Patriarchate of Romania | |
| Church of Holy Transfiguration | | | | | | 1878 | Pančevo | Serbia | Serbian Patriarchate | |

== See also ==
- List of tallest Eastern Orthodox church buildings
- List of largest church buildings
- List of tallest domes
- Lists of cathedrals
