= Viktor Pimushin =

Russian footballer (1955–2025)

Personal information
- Full name: Viktor Yuryevich Pimushin
- Date of birth: 29 April 1955
- Place of birth: Dzerzhinsky, Moscow Oblast, Russian SFSR, USSR
- Date of death: 9 June 2025 (aged 70)
- Height: 1.78 m (5 ft 10 in)
- Position: Forward

Senior career*
Years	Team	Apps	(Gls)
1977–1978	FC Spartak Kostroma	64	(24)
1978	FC Spartak Moscow (reserves)		
1979	FC Spartak Kostroma	19	(12)
1979–1980	FC Torpedo Moscow	39	(4)
1981–1985	FC Fakel Voronezh	175	(56)
1986–1988	FC Kuzbass Kemerovo	100	(41)
1988–1989	FC Fakel Voronezh	48	(22)
1990	FC Kuzbass Kemerovo	30	(11)
1991–1992	FC Kolkheti Khobi	23	(7)
1992	FC Fakel Voronezh	8	(1)
1992–1993	FC Pesch (Germany)		
1993	FC Baltika Kaliningrad	14	(6)
1994	FC Torgmash Lyubertsy	4	(1)
1995	FC Krasnogvardeyets Moscow	21	(1)

Managerial career
- 1995: FC Krasnogvardeyets Moscow (assistant)
- * Club domestic league appearances and goals

Viktor Yuryevich Pimushin (Russian: Виктор Юрьевич Пимушин; 29 April 1955 – 9 June 2025) was a Russian professional footballer. He made his professional debut in the Soviet Second League in 1977 for FC Spartak Kostroma.

Pimushin died on 9 June 2025, at the age of 70.
