= Antilokhovo =

Antilokhovo Антилохово
- Village
- Location within Ivanovo Oblast Location within Russia
- Coordinates: 56°30′N 41°08′E
- Country: Russia
- Region: Ivanovo Oblast
- District: Savinsky District
- Time zone: UTC+3:00

Antilokhovo (Russian: Антилохово) is a rural locality (a village) in Savinsky District, Ivanovo Oblast, Russia. Population: 75 (2010 census);

== Geography ==
This rural locality is located 10 kilometres (6.2 mi) from Savino (the district's administrative centre), 55 kilometres (34 mi) from Ivanovo (capital of Ivanovo Oblast) and 232 kilometres (144 mi) from Moscow. Mantsurikha is the nearest rural locality.
