= Zvonnitsa =

Structure for hanging bells

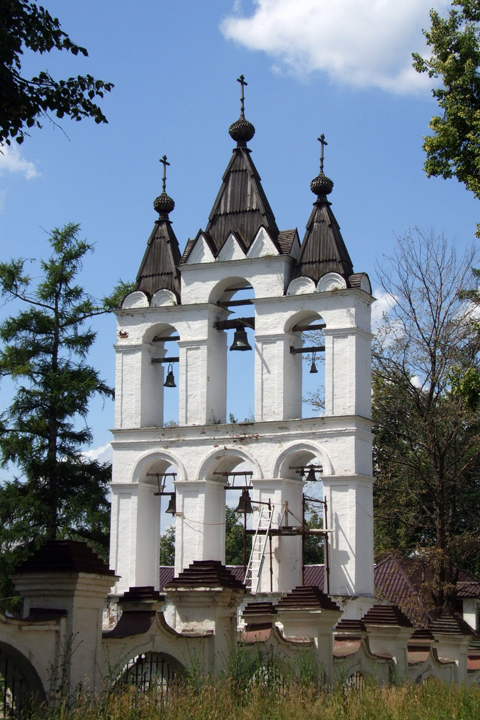
Zvonnitsa of the Transfiguration Cathedral in Vyazemy, Moscow Oblast.

A zvonnitsa (Russian: звонница, pl. звонницы, zvonnitsy; Ukrainian: дзвіниця, romanized: dzvinytsia; Polish: dzwonnica parawanowa; Romanian: zvoniţă) is a large rectangular structure containing multiple arches or beams that support bells, and a basal platform where bell ringers stand to perform the ringing using long ropes. It was an alternative to a bell tower in Russian, Polish and Romanian medieval architectural traditions, primarily used in Russian architecture of the 14th–17th centuries. Currently, zvonnitsy are especially widespread in the environs of Pskov.

Unlike bell towers in Western Europe, zvonnitsy in Russia were generally built of brick rather than stone. As a result, they were structurally weaker, which led to new solutions in the 19th-century to address issues with structural support and sufficient suspension of the bells.

Sometimes, zvonnitsy were mounted directly on church roofs, resulting in a special form of church called a pod zvonom (Russian: под звоном, lit. 'under ringing') or izhe pod kolokoly (иже под колоколы, 'under bells'). The most famous example of this type is the Church of St. John of the Ladder, adjacent to Ivan the Great Bell Tower in the Moscow Kremlin.

In Polish, the word dzwonnica refers to any type of bell tower, while the fortified trellis construction containing apertures for bells is referred to by the term dzwonnica parawanowa.

== Examples ==
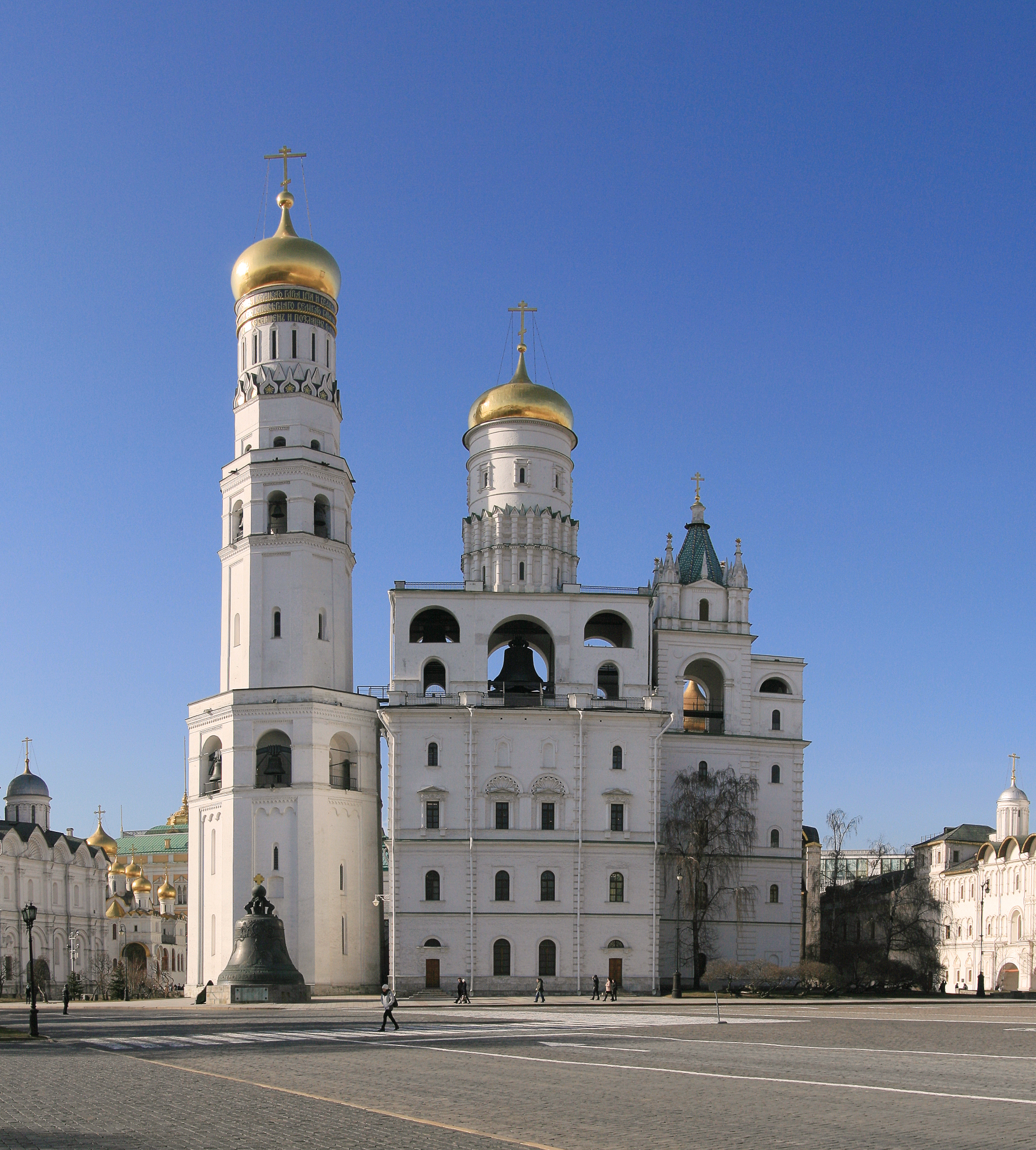
Ivan the Great Bell Tower, Moscow Kremlin, Moscow

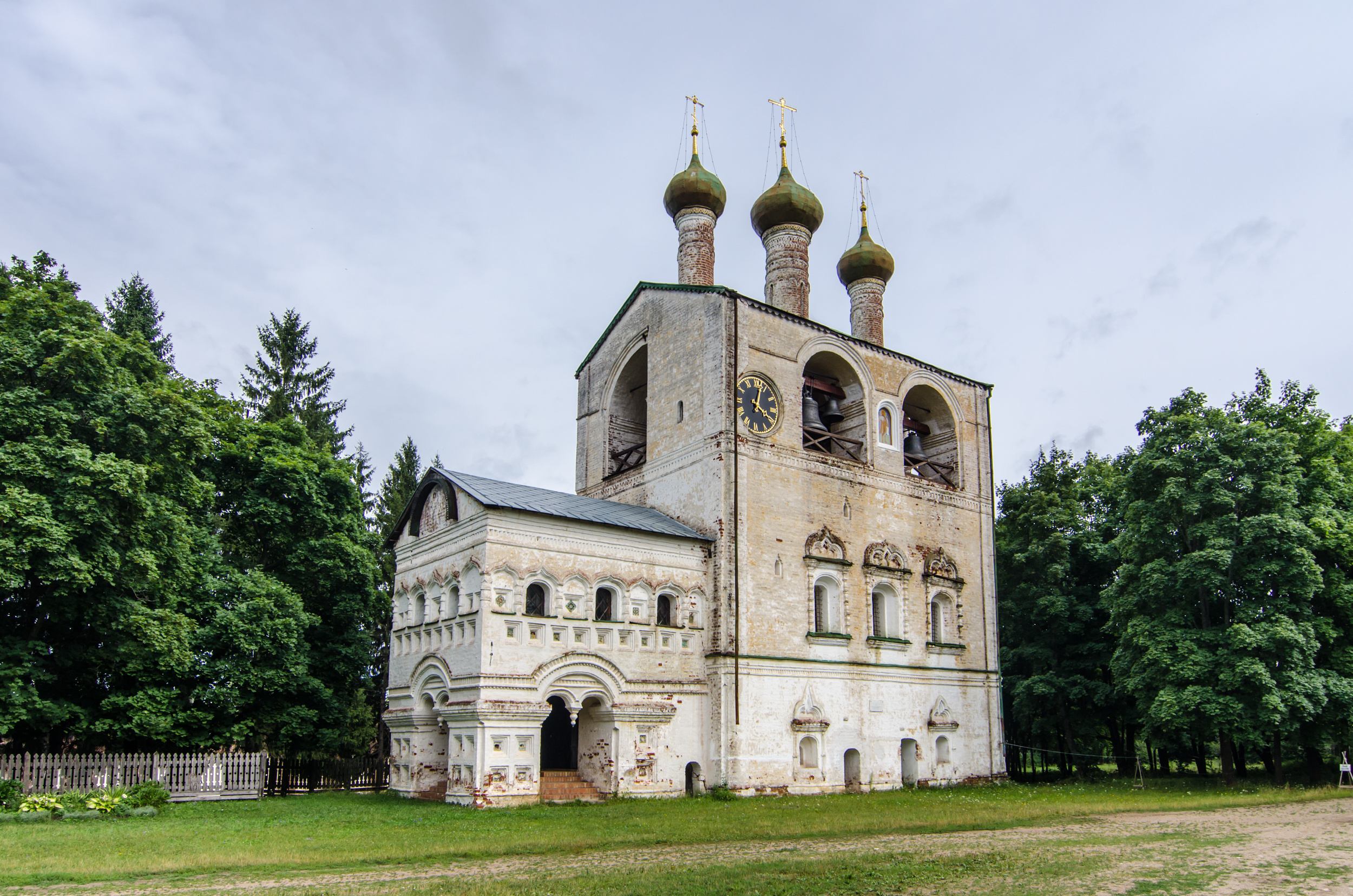
Borisoglebsky Monastery, Borisoglebsky, Yaroslavl Oblast

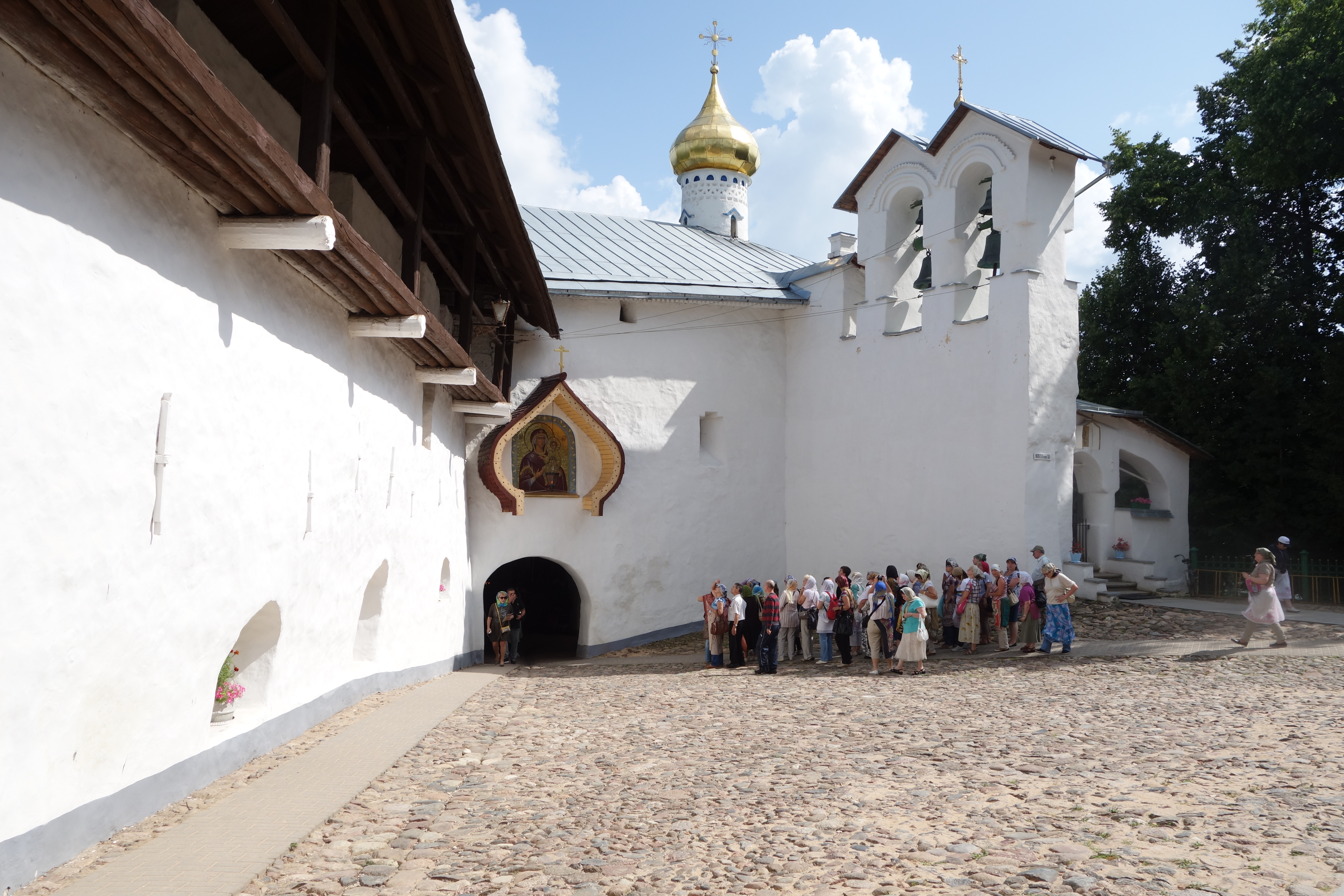
Church of St. Nicholas, Pskov-Caves Monastery, Pskov

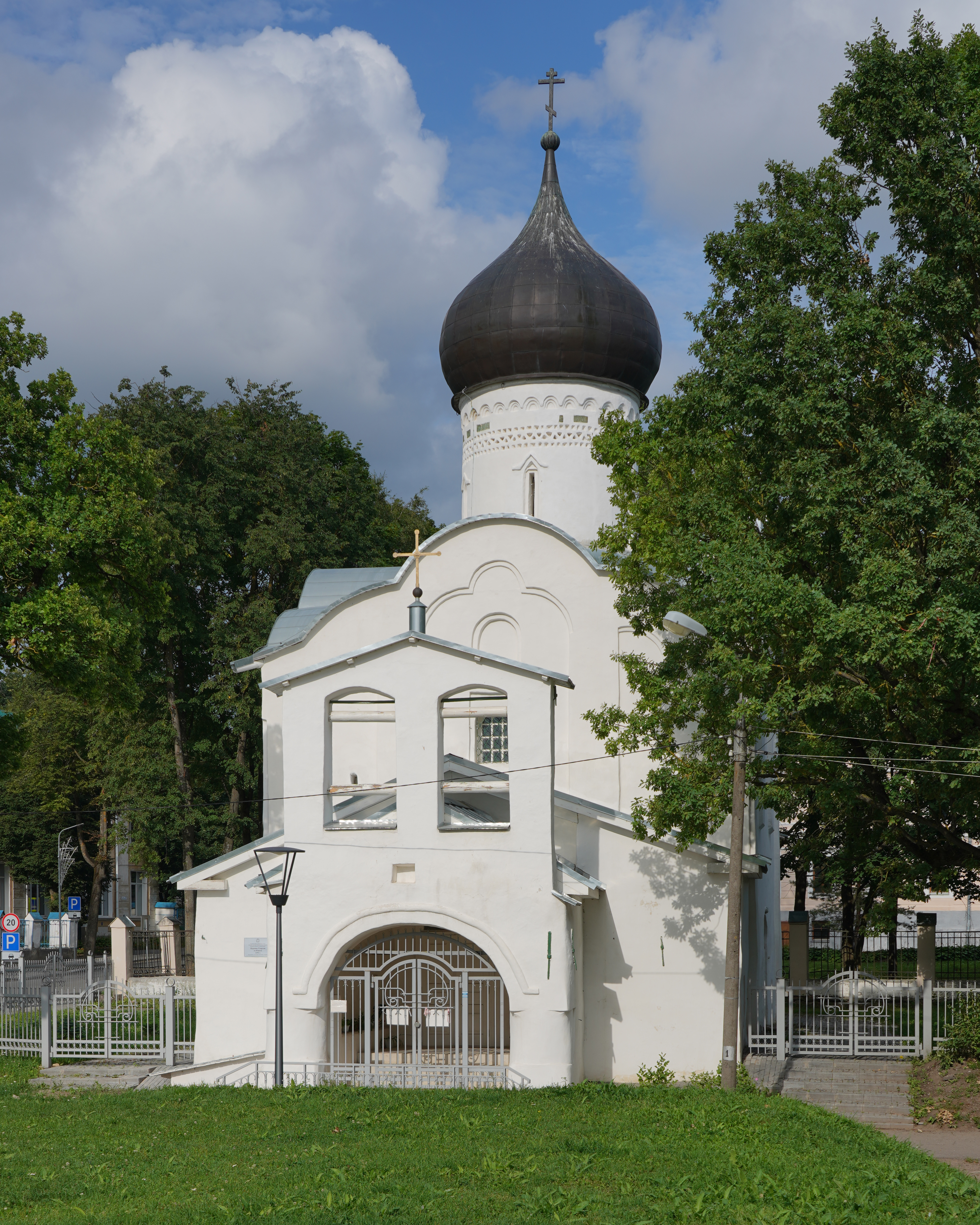
Church of St. George the Victorious, Pskov

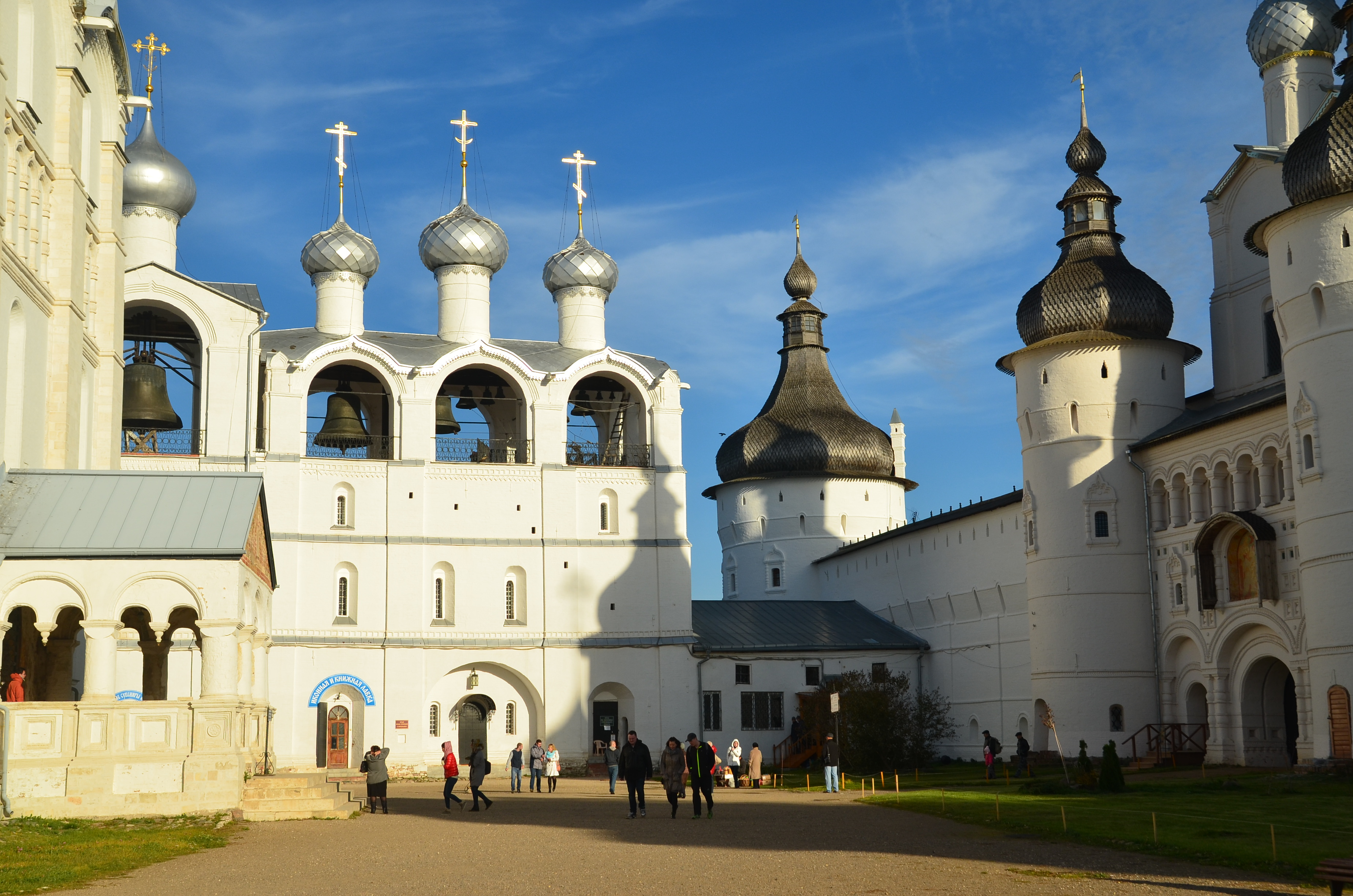
Assumption Cathedral, Rostov Kremlin, Rostov

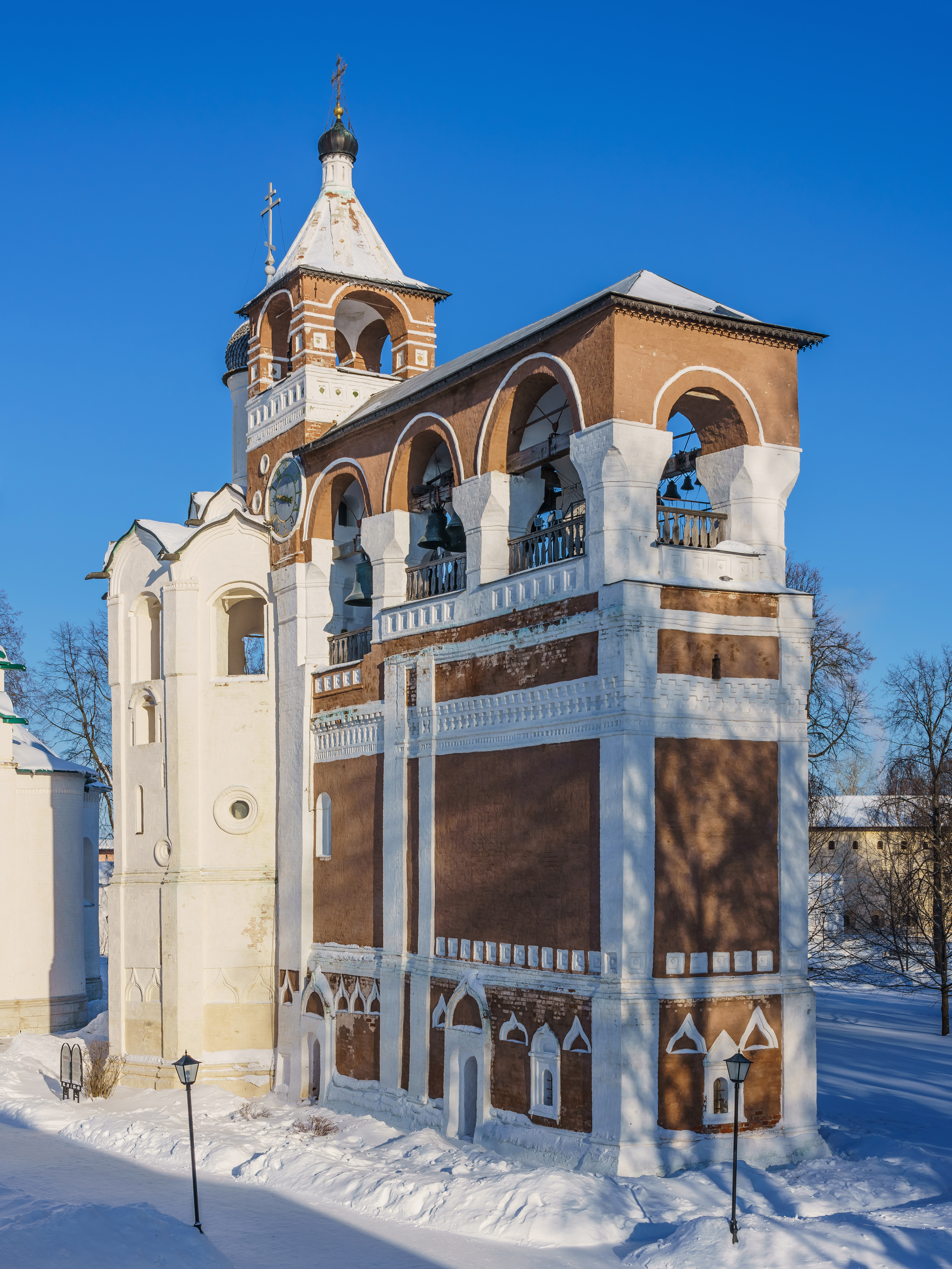
Monastery of Saint Euthymius, Suzdal

== See also ==
- Bell tower
- Belfry

== Sources ==
- Williams, Edward V. (14 July 2014). The Bells of Russia: History and Technology. Princeton University Press. ISBN 978-1-4008-5463-9.
