= Annunciation Cathedral, Voronezh =

Coordinates: 51°40′34″N 39°12′39″E

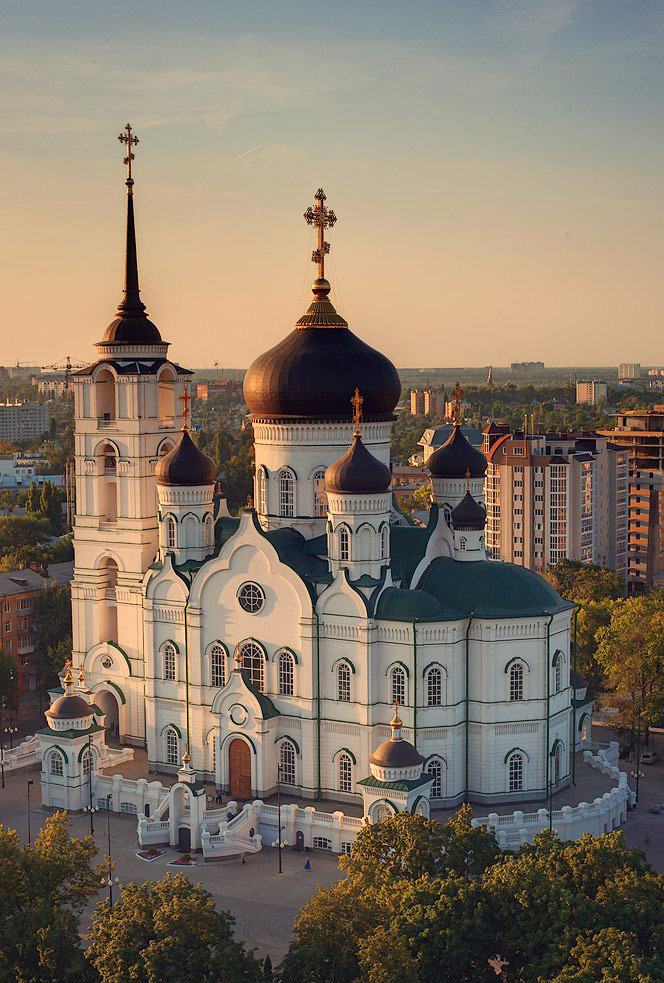

The Annunciation Cathedral (Russian: Благовещенский собор) in Voronezh, Russia, is one of the tallest Eastern Orthodox churches in the world.

The existing five-domed building of the cathedral with an attached bell tower was erected between 1998 and 2009. It was patterned after St. Vladimir's Cathedral, built in the late 19th century in a Russo-Byzantine style harking back to the works of Konstantin Thon and demolished by the Bolsheviks in the 20th century.

The church takes its name from the eponymous Ukrainian Baroque cathedral that was built in 1718–35 in place of an earlier church commissioned by St. Mitrofan of Voronezh; it was destroyed by the Soviets in the 1950s. The existing bell tower echoes the one designed for the old cathedral by Giacomo Quarenghi.

A monument to St. Mitrofan, whose relics are kept inside, was unveiled in front of the church in 2003.
