= Viktor Dorkin =

Russian politician (1953–2006)

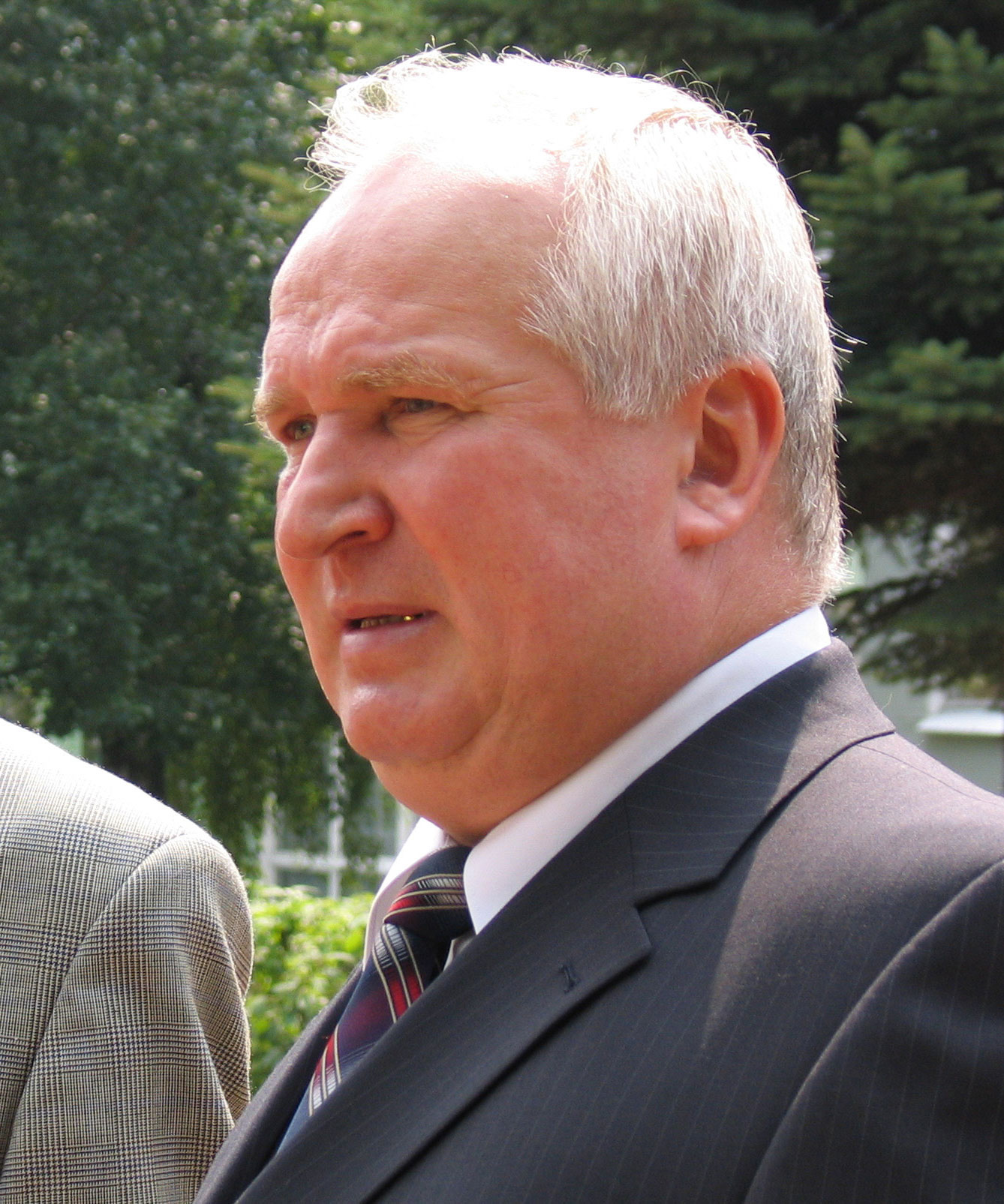
Viktor Ivanovich Dorkin

Viktor Ivanovich Dorkin (Russian: Виктор Иванович Доркин; October 3, 1953 – March 30, 2006) was a Russian politician. He served as Mayor of Dzerzhinsky, Moscow Oblast from 1991 until his death.

== Biography ==
Dorkin grew up in Novodevichinsky sovkhoz in Shigonsky District of Kuybyshev Oblast, Soviet Union. He obtained a degree in chemical engineering in 1976 from Kuybyshev Politechnical School.

After graduation, he was assigned to Lyubertsy Science and Research Institute of Chemical Technology. There, he worked hard, advancing from engineer to senior research officer and deputy chief of the 142nd laboratory.

In 1990, he was elected as a chairman of the Dzerzhinsky town council. In 1991, he became the head of the local government board of Dzerzhinsky. In 1996, he was elected mayor of Dzerzhinsky. In 1999, he was re-elected as the head of the local government board of Dzerzhinsky. He was married and had two children.

== Death ==
Dorkin was assassinated in 2006. The prosecutor's office named Dmitry Lukin, former vice-president of the local football club Orbita, as mandator in the assassination. He was arrested at Vnukovo Airport near Moscow in 2016 and acquitted by jury two years later.
