= Cathedral of the Lord's Ascension, Bacău =

Church in Bacău, Romania

Cathedral of the Lord's Ascension Catedrala Înălțarea Domnului din Bacău
- Cathedral of the Lord's Ascension, 2019

Religion
- Affiliation: Romanian Orthodox Church
- Rite: Eastern Orthodox Church
- Ecclesiastical or organizational status: Active
- Year consecrated: 2018

Location
- Location: Romania
- Municipality: Bacău
- Interactive map of Cathedral of the Lord's Ascension; Catedrala Înălțarea Domnului din Bacău
- Coordinates: 46°34′12″N 26°54′38″E

Architecture
- Type: Church
- Funded by: Private and Public funds
- Groundbreaking: 1991
- Completed: 2018

Specifications
- Capacity: 5,000 people
- Width: 38m
- Height (max): 70m
- Dome: 3
- Materials: Stone, wood

The Church of the Ascension of the Lord (Romanian: Biserica Înălțarea Domnului) is a church in Bacău, Romania and is the third largest cathedral in the country, after the People's Salvation Cathedral of Bucharest and the Holy Trinity Cathedral of Baia Mare.

Officially the structure is a church and not a cathedral, because Bacău is not the seat of any bishop (the cathedral of the Bishop of Roman and Bacău, from which this parochial church belongs, being in Roman). However, due to its size and importance, it is called by the locals "cathedral" – in the sense used in the primary Christianity, that of the main place of the city. Officially if the bishop will serve in this church, it will be cathedral or co-cathedral.

== History ==
Cathedral under construction in 2008

On 25 March 1992 Ioachim Mareş, together with the Council of Bacău County (regional parliament), laid the foundation stone of the "Ascension of the Lord" Cathedral, and in the spring of 1993 the works were started, starting with excavations up to 11.80 m. The architect was Constantin Amâiei, and it was finalized by the new architecture office Vanel Exim.

== Appearance ==
The construction, with a floor area of 1,706 m^{2}, has a total length of 70 m, a width of 38 m and a maximum height of 70 m (63 m at the base of the cross on the main tower, the main cross having 7 m height).

The foundation starts from 10 meters below ground, with a basement comprising two levels. The lowest level houses an exhibition hall, a book store, and a local air defense shelter. The next level is a paraclis, after which, at level 0, the cathedral itself begins, with concrete walls reaching a thickness of one meter in certain sections. The dome of the nave has an opening of 24 meters.

The 18 bells with which the cathedral is equipped, weighing between 30 kilograms and 4.5 tons, were manufactured in Innsbruck. Of these, 13 are designed with a special shape. They are synchronized by computers, thus being able to play about 1,000 different songs, specific to certain moments during the church year. The other 5 are classic bells.

The main cross, the largest in the country, is 7 meters high, an opening of the side arms of 4.20 meters, and a weight of almost 2 tons. The other three crosses, mounted on the turrets that hold the cathedral bells, are 4 meters high and the opening of the arms is 2.46 meters.

== See also ==
- List of largest Eastern Orthodox church buildings
