= Dormition Cathedral, Khabarovsk =

Cathedral in Khabarovsk, Russia

Dormition Cathedral of Khabarovsk
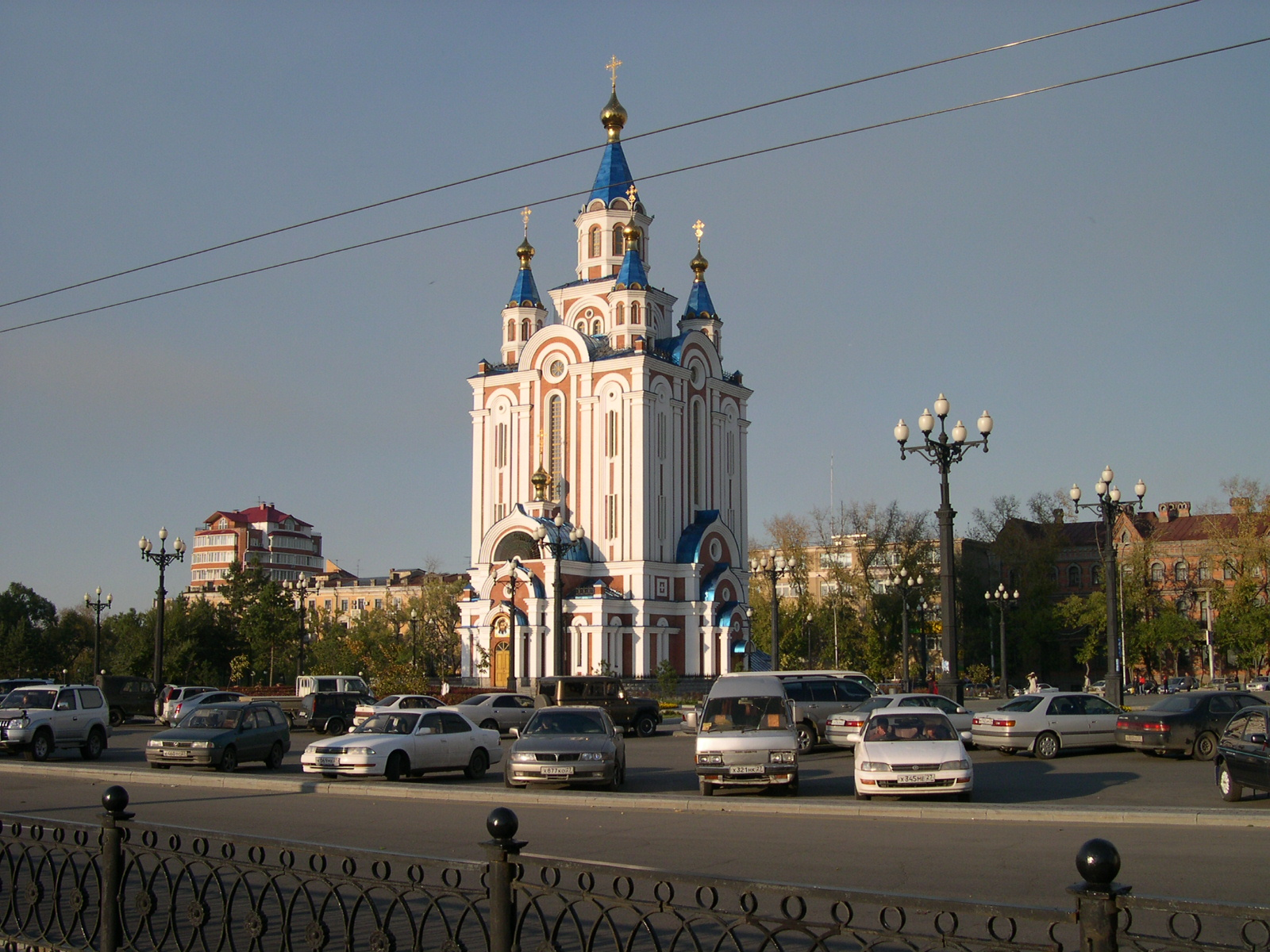
- The Dormition Cathedral on Komsomolskaya Square
- Dormition Cathedral of Khabarovsk
- 48°28′23″N 135°03′24″E
- Country: Russia
- Denomination: Russian Orthodox

The Dormition Cathedral of Khabarovsk (Russian: Градо-Хабаровский Успенский собор, Grado-Khabarovsky Uspensky sobor) is a Russian Orthodox cathedral. It is one of the largest churches in the Russian Far East, and was built in 2000–02 to a design by Yuri Podlesny, a local architect.

The five-domed church stands about 60 meters tall. Its design harks back to Konstantin Thon's design for the Annunciation Church in Saint Petersburg.

The church contains a 19th-century copy of the Abazino icon of the Theotokos from a previous church on the site. That church was built in the 1890s and contained the marble tomb of Baron Andrei von Korff. It was demolished by the Communists in 1930.

== See also ==
- Khabarovsk Metropolitan Cathedral
