= Dzerzhinsky, Moscow Oblast =

Town in Moscow Oblast, Russia

Dzerzhinsky Дзержинский
- Town
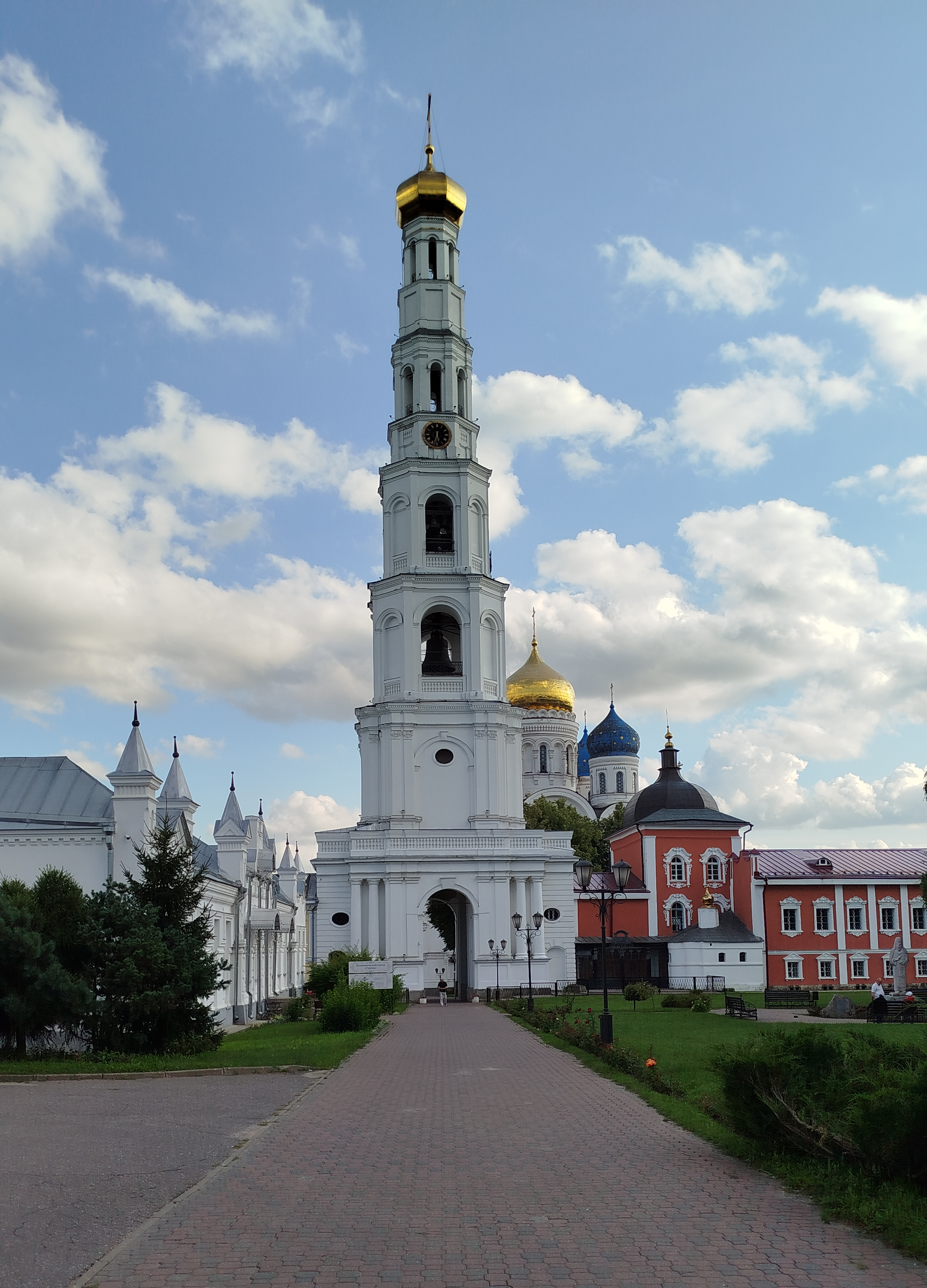
- Bell tower of Ugresha Monastery

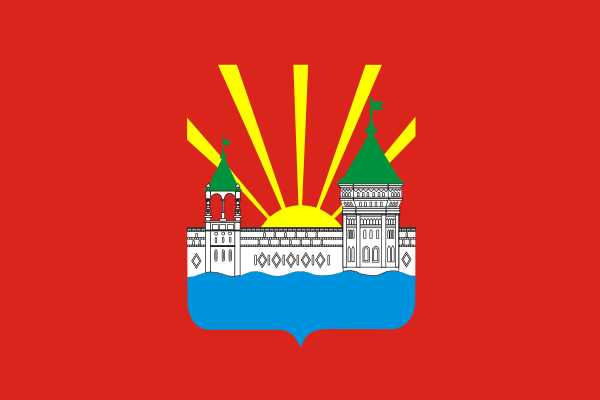
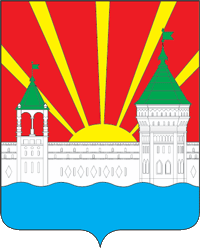
- Flag Coat of arms
- Interactive map of Dzerzhinsky
- Location of Dzerzhinsky Dzerzhinsky (Moscow Oblast)
- Coordinates: 55°38′N 37°51′E
- Country: Russia
- Federal subject: Moscow Oblast
- Founded: 1380 (Julian)
- Town status since: 1981

Area
  - Total: 15.66 km^{2} (6.05 sq mi)
- Elevation: 160 m (520 ft)

Population (2010 Census)
  - Total: 47,163
  - Estimate (2025): 57,308 (+21.5%)
  - Density: 3,012/km^{2} (7,800/sq mi)

Administrative status
  - Subordinated to: Dzerzhinsky Town Under Oblast Jurisdiction
  - Capital of: Dzerzhinsky Town Under Oblast Jurisdiction

Municipal status
  - Urban okrug: Dzerzhinsky Urban Okrug
  - Capital of: Dzerzhinsky Urban Okrug
- Time zone: UTC+3 (MSK)
- Postal codes: 140090, 140091, 140093
- OKTMO ID: 46711000001
- Website: www.ugresh.ru

Dzerzhinsky (Russian: Дзержинский) is a town in Moscow Oblast, Russia, located on the bank of the Moskva River, 5 kilometers (3.1 mi) south of the city of Lyubertsy. The western part of Dzerzhinsky borders with the territory of the federal city of Moscow. Population: 57,918 (2021 census); 47,163 (2010 census); 41,488 (2002 census); 36,108 (1989 Soviet census).

== History ==
=== St. Nicholas Monastery ===
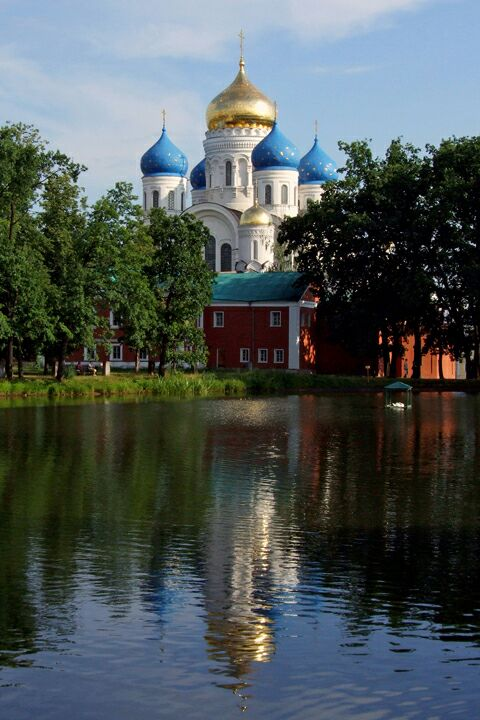
The Monastery of St. Nicholas

The settlement has grown around the Ugresha Monastery which stands at the heart of the modern town. The monastery has been one of the richest in Russia since the 17th century when Tsar Alexis and Patriarch Nikon built their palaces on the grounds. It was greatly expanded in the 19th century, under the supervision of St. Pimen of Ugreshi. One of the new churches in the monastery is dedicated to St. Pimen. The walled area of the monastery has several picturesque ponds.

=== Modern history ===
After the October Revolution of 1917, in an effort to fight child homelessness, the monastery was reorganized into a children labor colony in 1920. The colony was later transformed into a labor commune by Felix Dzerzhinsky. In 1921, the colony spread outside the boundaries of the former monastery and an official settlement was established. In 1938, it was granted urban-type settlement status, just after the commune had dissolved. Town status was granted to Dzerzhinsky in 1981.

On March 31, 2006, Viktor Dorkin, the head of the Local Government Board, was shot and killed. Investigation stated that he was assassinated because of his professional career. One killer was detained before May 5, 2006.

== Administrative and municipal status ==
Within the administrative divisions framework, it is incorporated as Dzerzhinsky Town Under Oblast Jurisdiction—an administrative unit with the status equal to that of the districts. As a municipal division, Dzerzhinsky Town Under Oblast Jurisdiction is incorporated as Dzerzhinsky Urban Okrug.

== Economy ==
The town's industry comprises Heat and Power Central #22 (ТЭЦ-22, CHP-22), a reinforced concrete constructions factory, and military chemical industry.

=== Transportation ===
Lyubertsy–Dzerzhinsky railway is used for cargo transportation only. The passenger line was dismantled due to inefficiency.

== Culture and education ==
Six secondary schools and one professional school operate in the town, as well as a musical school and a school of arts. Dzerzhinsky has a local newspaper,"Ugreshskiye Vesti" («Угре́шские вести», "Ugresh news").

== Notable people ==
- Viktor Pimushin (born 1955), Russian retired professional footballer
- Alexey Pleshakov (born 1954), Head of the local government board

== International relations ==
=== Twin towns and sister cities ===
Dzerzhinsky is twinned with:

Marmaris, Turkey; Berkovitsa, Bulgaria; Montana, Bulgaria; Krasnoperekopsk, Ukraine; Maloyaroslavets, Russia; Ivanovo, Russia	Gus-Khrustalny, Russia; Ozyory, Russia; Soligalich, Russia; Aleksin, Russia; Gubkin, Russia; Belomorsk, Russia
