= Transfiguration Cathedral, Khabarovsk =

Church in Russia

Coordinates: 48°27′58″N 135°04′01″E

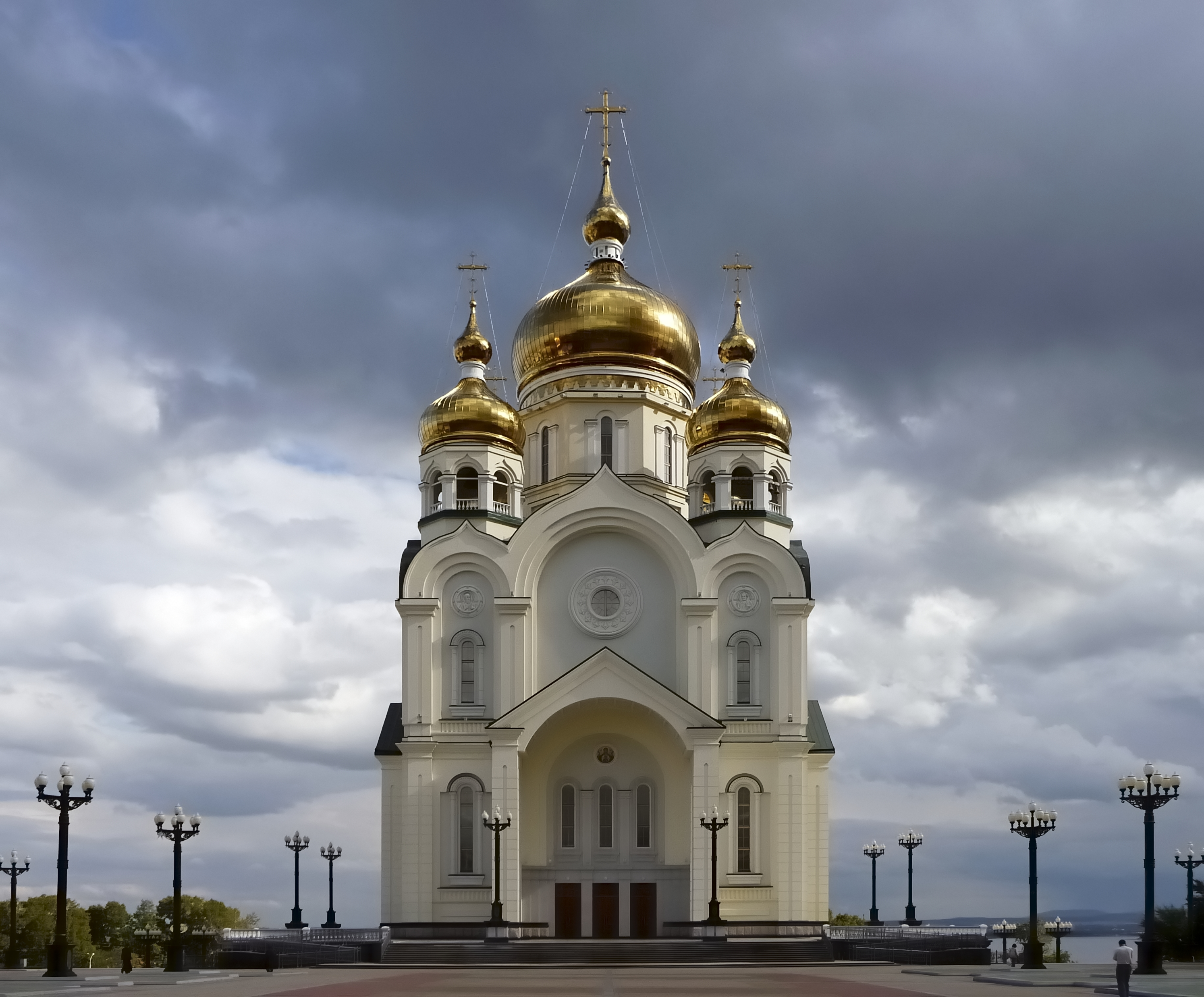
The Cathedral of the Saviour's Transfiguration

The Transfiguration Cathedral (Russian: Спасо-Преображенский собор, Spaso-Preobrazhensky sobor) is an Eastern Orthdox Cathedral in Khabarovsk, Russia. It is located on a steep bluff overlooking the Amur River. It stands 96 meters tall and it is the third tallest church in Russia after St. Isaac's Cathedral and the Cathedral of Christ the Saviour. It was built over 2001-2004 to a traditional design reminiscent of Konstantin Thon's works. The church is surmounted by four Ukrainian-style gilded domes, the central one being the largest. Its spectacular location on a hill was chosen by Patriarch of Moscow and all Rus' Alexis II of Moscow during a helicopter flight over Khabarovsk.

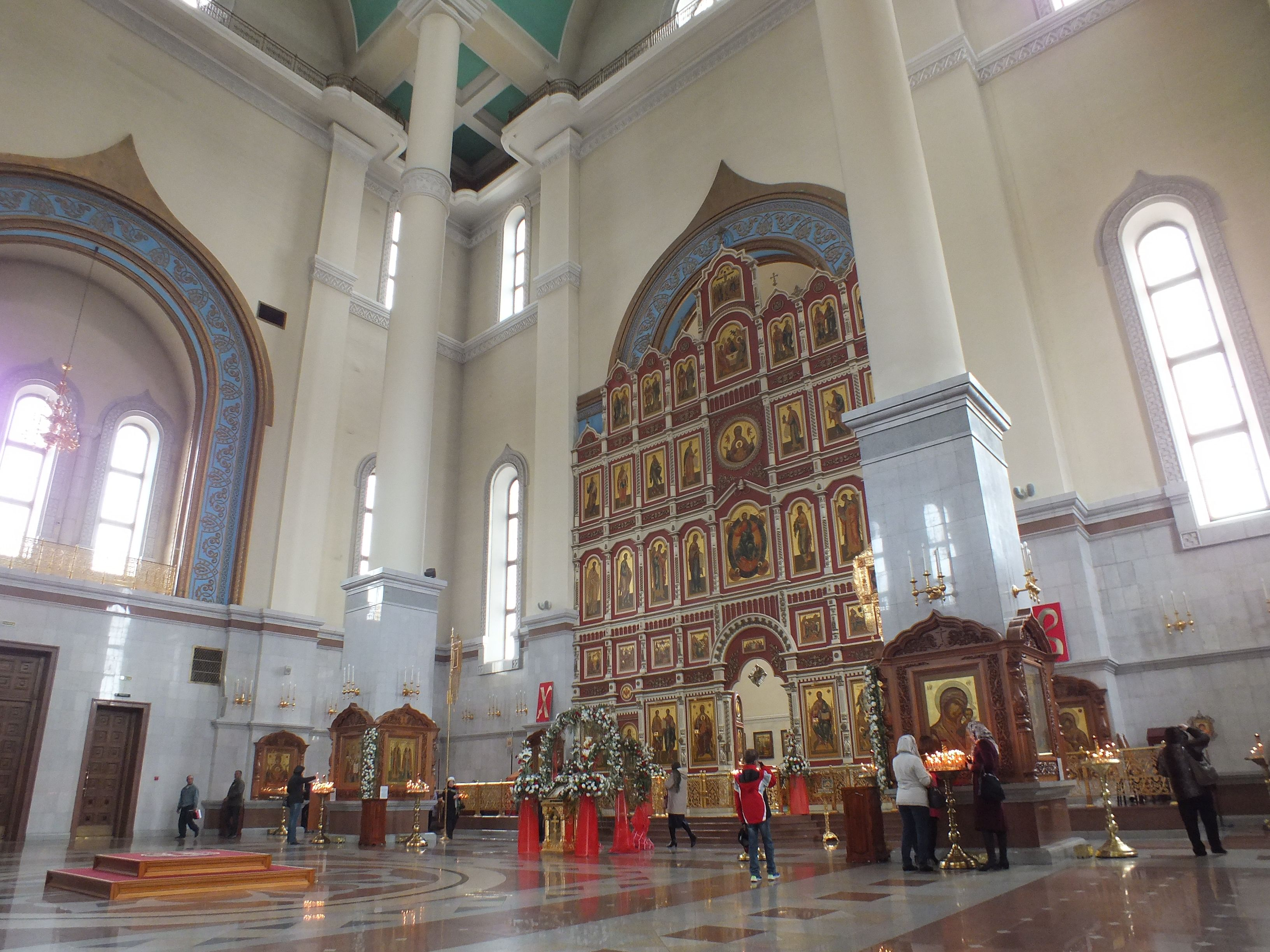
The interior of the cathedral during Easter. The royal doors are open.

== See also ==
- Khabarovsk City Cathedral
- List of tallest Orthodox church buildings
