= Naval Cathedral =

Naval Cathedral may refer to the following:

== Russian naval cathedrals ==
- St. Nicholas Naval Cathedral in Saint Petersburg (1753-62)
- Naval Cathedral in Kronstadt (1903-1913)
- St Nicholas Naval Cathedral, Karosta (1901-1903)

== Other ==
- Naval Cathedral (Biliran), the seat of the Bishops of Naval in the Philippines
