= Alexander Nevsky Cathedral =

Alexander Nevsky Cathedral may refer to the following (alphabetically by country, then by town):

- Alexander Nevsky Cathedral, Baku, Azerbaijan
- Alexander Nevsky Cathedral, Sofia, Bulgaria
- Alexander Nevsky Cathedral, Tallinn, Estonia
- Alexander Nevsky Cathedral, Paris, France
- Alexander Nevsky Cathedral, Tiflis, Georgia
- Alexander Nevsky Cathedral, Łódź, Poland
- Alexander Nevsky Cathedral, Warsaw, Poland
- Alexander Nevsky Cathedral, Izhevsk, Russia
- Alexander Nevsky Cathedral, Moscow, Russia
- Alexander Nevsky Cathedral, Nizhny Novgorod, Russia
- Alexander Nevsky Cathedral, Novosibirsk, Russia
- Alexander Nevsky Cathedral, Tver, Russia
- Alexander Nevsky Cathedral, Volgograd, Russia
- Alexander Nevsky Cathedral, Yalta, Ukraine
- Saint Alexander Nevsky Cathedral, Sofia, Bulgaria
- Alexander Nevsky Cathedral, Allison Park, Pittsburgh, Pennsylvania, US; under the jurisdiction of the Orthodox Church in America (OCA)
- Alexander Nevsky Cathedral, Howell, New Jersey, US; under the jurisdiction of the Russian Orthodox Church Outside of Russia (ROCOR)

== See also ==
- Alexander Nevsky Chapel
- Alexander Nevsky Lavra, Saint Petersburg, Russia
- Church of St. Alexander Nevsky, Vilnius, Lithuania
- Church of St. Alexander Nevsky, Belgrade, Serbia
