= Alexander Nevsky Chapel =

Alexander Nevsky Chapel may refer to the following:

- Alexander Nevsky Chapel, Akutan, Alaska
- Alexander Nevsky Chapel, Fergana, Uzbekistan

== See also ==
- Alexander Nevsky Cathedral
- Alexander Nevsky Lavra, Saint Petersburg, Russia
