= Vasily Kosyakov =

Russian architect

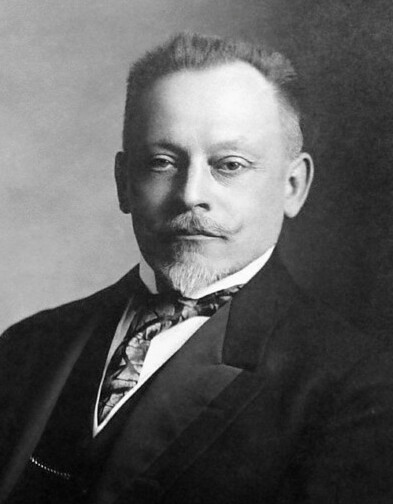
Vasily Kosyakov

Vasily Antonovich Kosyakov (Russian: Василий Антонович Косяков; 1862 – 5 September 1921) was a Russian Imperial architect and a specialist of the Neo-Russian and Neo-Byzantine architecture in the Russian Empire. He was the author of the projects of St Vladimir's Cathedral, Astrakhan, the Church of Our Lady the Merciful, Saint Petersburg, Kronstadt Naval Cathedral, St. Nicholas Naval Cathedral in Alexander III Harbour in Libau (now Karosta, Liepāja), the Church of the Dormition of the Mother of God, Saint Petersburg, and others.

He is buried at Novodevichy Cemetery, in Saint Petersburg.
