= Alexander Nevsky Lavra =

Monastery in Saint Petersburg, Russia

Coordinates: 59.921°N 30.388°E

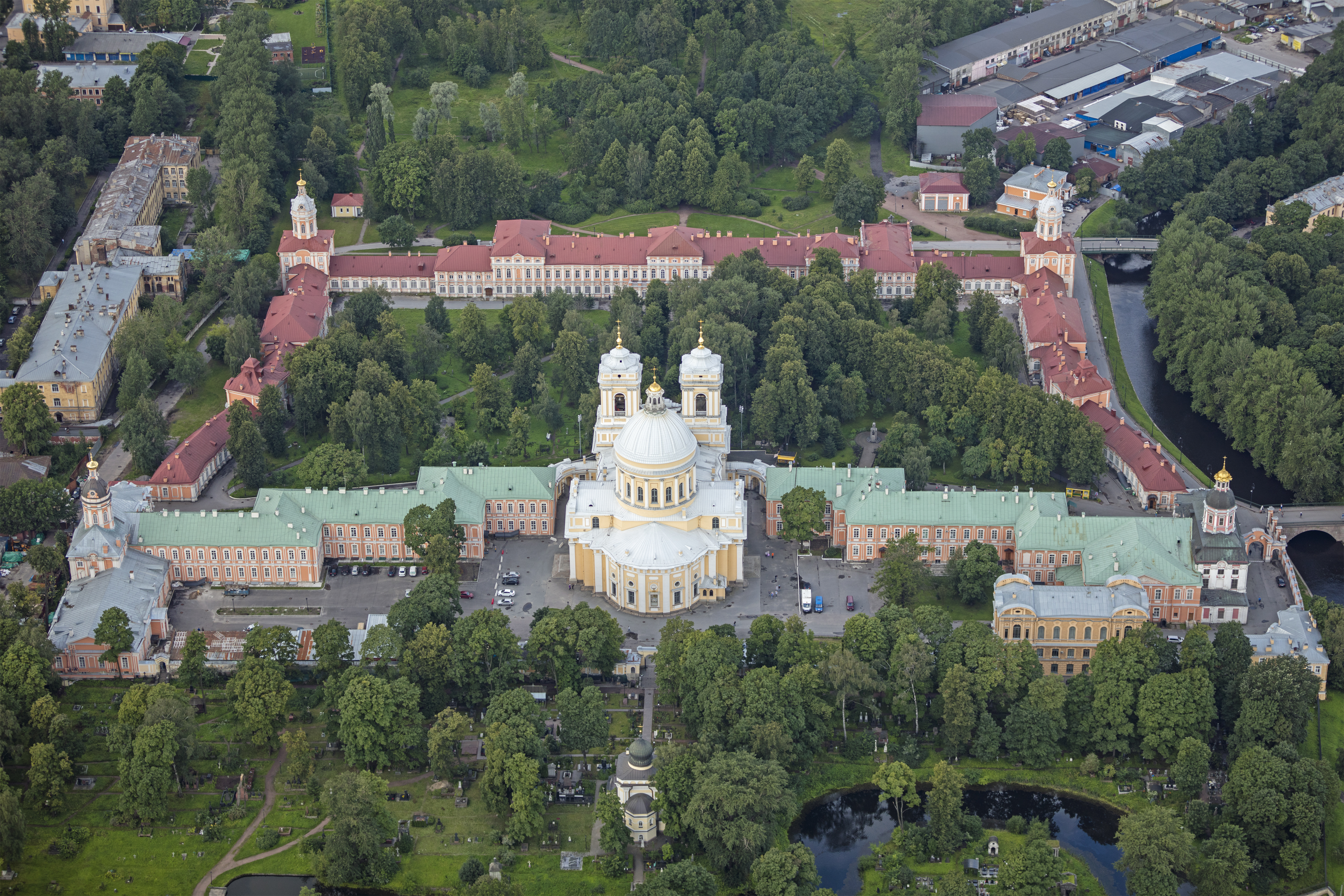
Aerial view of the Alexander Nevsky Monastery (2016)

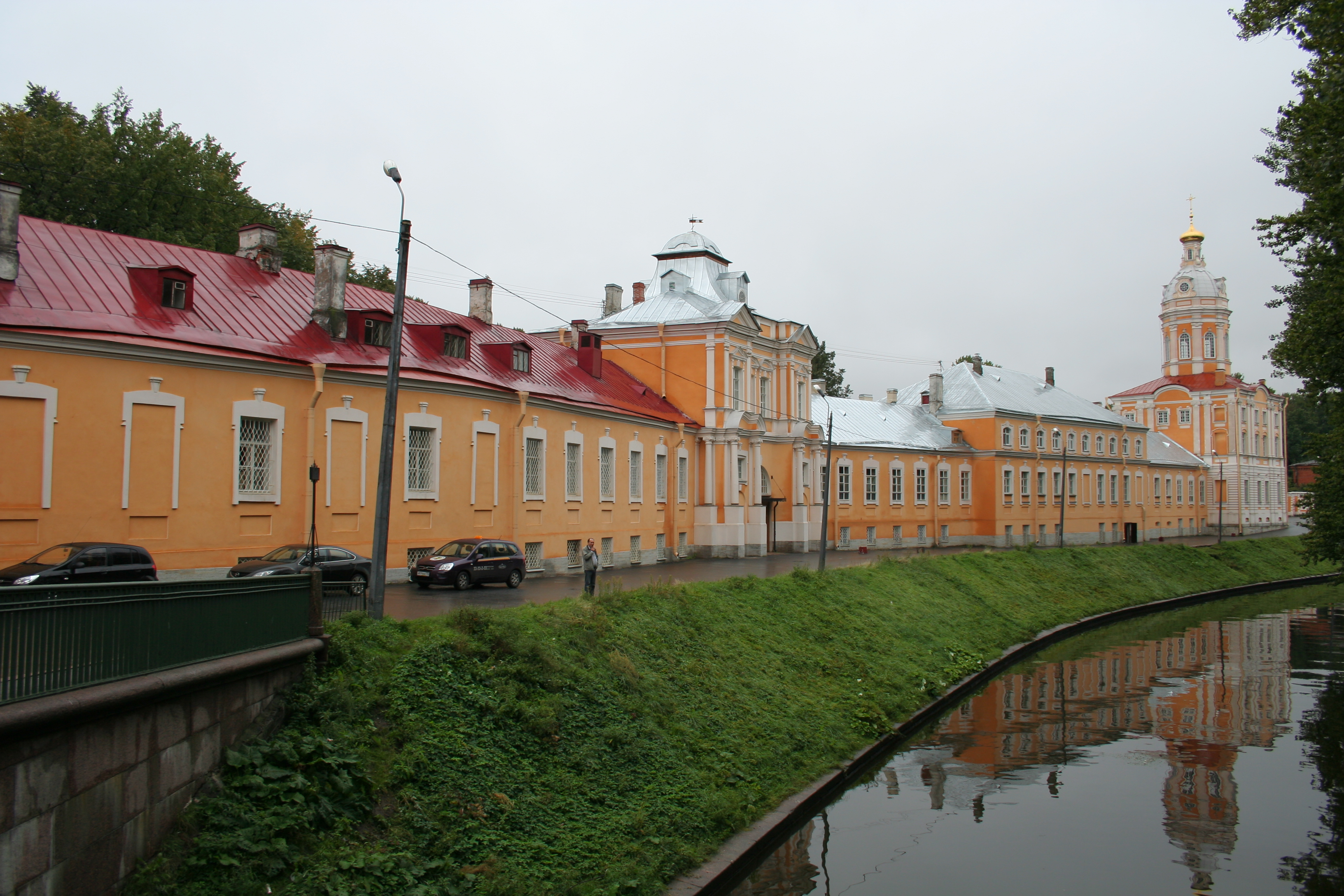
The outer wall of the lavra

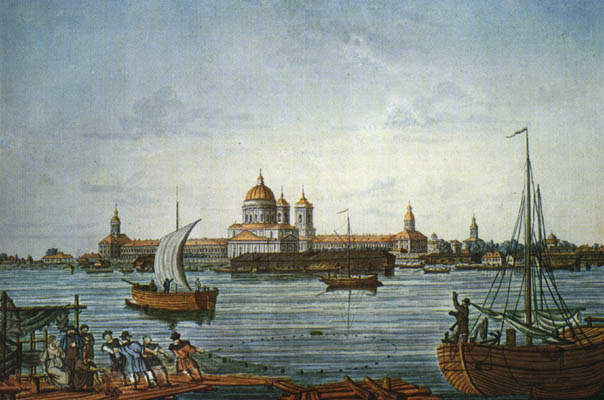
The monastery in the early 1800s

Saint Alexander Nevsky Lavra or Saint Alexander Nevsky Monastery was founded by Peter I of Russia in 1710 at the eastern end of the Nevsky Prospekt in Saint Petersburg, in the belief that this was the site of the Neva Battle in 1240 when Alexander Nevsky, a prince, defeated the Swedes. In actuality, the battle took place about 19 kilometres (12 mi) away from that site. "On April 5, 1713, in St. Petersburg, in the presence of Peter I, the wooden Church of the Annunciation was consecrated. This day is considered the official founding date of the Alexander Nevsky Lavra." (April 5, 1713 Gregorian was March 25 Julian, feast of the Annunciation.)

"The relics of St. Alexander Nevsky were solemnly transferred from Vladimir to the new capital of Russia September 12, 1724, by decree of Peter the Great." (It was August 30 Julian, or September 10 Gregorian; however, since the Russian Orthodox Church still follows the Julian calendar, the transfer of the relics is celebrated on August 30 Julian, which corresponds to September 12 Gregorian in the 20th–21st centuries.) Nevsky became patron of the newly founded Russian capital.

During Soviet times in the 20th century, the massive silver sarcophagus of St. Alexander Nevsky was relocated to the State Hermitage Museum. It is still held there (without the relics).

In 1797, the monastery was raised to the rank of lavra, making it only the third lavra in the Russian Orthodox Church. It followed the Kiev Monastery of the Caves and the Trinity Monastery of St Sergius in this designation.

The monastery grounds contain two baroque churches, the Annunciation Church and the Feodorovskaya Church, designed by father and son Trezzini and built from 1717–1722 and 1742–1750, respectively; the Neoclassical Holy Trinity Cathedral, built in 1778–1790 to a design by Ivan Starov and consecrated to the Holy Trinity; and numerous structures of lesser importance. It also contains the Lazarevskoe, Tikhvin, Nikolskoe, and Kazachye cemeteries, where ornate tombs of Leonhard Euler, Mikhail Lomonosov, Alexander Suvorov, Nikolay Karamzin, Modest Mussorgsky, Pyotr Ilyich Tchaikovsky, Fyodor Dostoevsky, Karl Ivanovich Rossi, Prince Garsevan Chavchavadze, a Georgian aristocrat, Sergei Witte, and other famous Russians are preserved.

During the Revolution, Kollontai, the People's Commissar of Social Welfare, wanted to convert the monastery into a 'sanctuary for war invalids'. On 19 January 1918 she sent a group of sailors there, who were met by an angry crowd of worshippers. Fighting broke out and a priest was shot and killed.

Alexander Nevsky Square developed along the front of the Saint Nevsky Lavra. Shoppers can buy bread baked by the monks. Visitors may visit the cathedral and cemeteries for a small admission fee. While many of the grave sites are located behind tall concrete walls, especially those of famous Russians, many can be seen by passers-by while strolling down Obukhovskoy Oborony Street.

== See also ==
- Trinity Cathedral, Saint Petersburg
- Alexander Nevsky Cathedrals
- Alexander Nevsky Chapels
