= Alexander Nevsky Cathedral, Novosibirsk =

Eastern Orthodox cathedral in Novosibirsk, Russia

Coordinates: 55°01′10″N 82°55′21″E

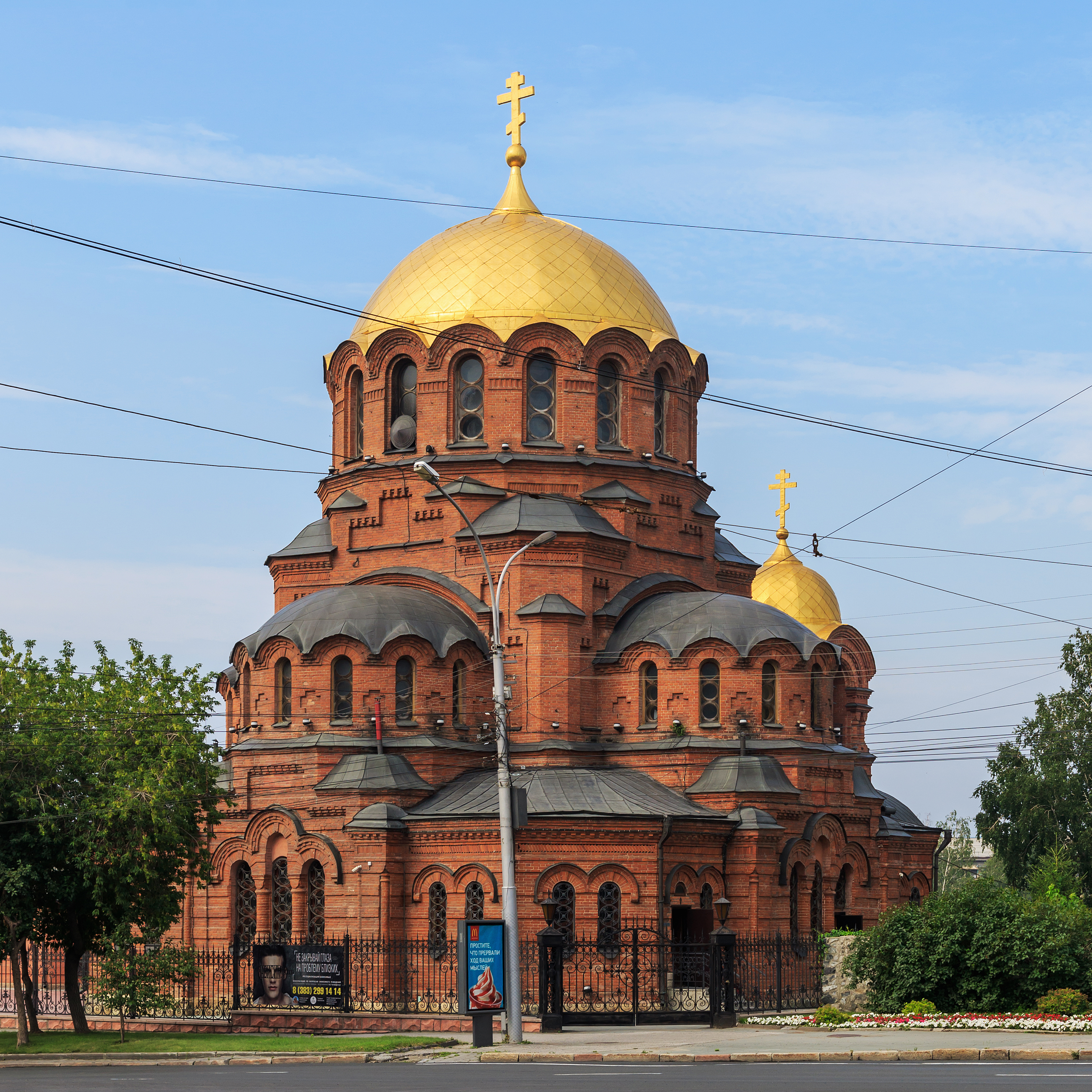
Alexander Nevsky Cathedral, Novosibirsk

Alexander Nevsky Cathedral (Russian: Собор во имя Александра Невского) is the Eastern Orthodox Cathedral in Novosibirsk, Russia, named in honor of Saint Alexander Nevsky. Belongs to the Novosibirsk eparchy of the Russian Orthodox Church.

It is one of the first stone constructions in Novo-Nikolayevsk (former name of Novosibirsk). The church was built in Neo-Byzantine architectural style in 1896–1899. The building design was influenced by the design of Church of Our Lady the Merciful in St Petersburg built a few years earlier.

It was opened and consecrated on December 29, 1899. In 1915, it became a cathedral.

The cathedral was a specific monument to Tsar Alexander III who initiated construction of the Trans-Siberian Railway which resulted in the foundation of Novo-Nikolayevsk (now Novosibirsk) as a new railway station.

In 1937, the cathedral was closed by Soviet authorities.

In 1988, the year of the 1000th anniversary of Kievan Rus' conversion to Christianity, a movement began for the restitution of the cathedral. In 1989, it was re-opened.

On July 16, 2017 a monument to Nicholas II and his son, Alexei Nikolaevich was opened to commemorate the 99th anniversary of the murder of the Romanov family. Neither the government nor the citizens were informed about the creation of the monument. It has later fallen victim to an act of vandalism in the early morning of August 1. It was restored within a month and reconsecrated on September 18.

== See also ==
- Neo-Byzantine architecture in the Russian Empire
- Alexander Nevsky Cathedral - other cathedrals of the same name
