= St. Alexander Nevsky Cathedral, Warsaw =

Cathedral in Poland

Coordinates: 52.2413°N 21.0131°E

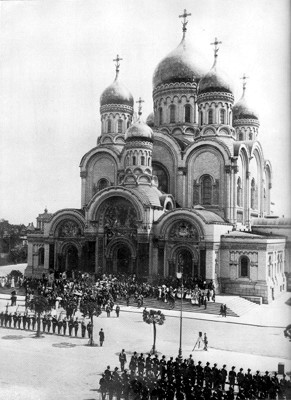
Photograph of Alexander Nevsky Cathedral in Warsaw shortly after completion in 1912.

The St. Alexander Nevsky Cathedral (Polish: Sobór św. Aleksandra Newskiego, Russian: Александро-Невский собор) was a Russian Orthodox Cathedral in Saxon Square built in Warsaw, Congress Poland, then a part of the Russian Empire. The cathedral was designed by the distinguished Russian architect Leon Benois, and was built between 1894 and 1912. When it was finally completed, it was 70 metres in height, at that time, the tallest building in Warsaw.

It was demolished in mid-1920s by the Polish authorities less than 15 years after its construction. The negative connotations in Poland associated with Russian imperial policy towards Poland, and belief it was built purposely to hurt Polish national feelings, was cited as the major motive by the proponents of the demolition, especially since the church occupied one of Warsaw's main squares. The cathedral shared the fate of many Orthodox churches demolished after Poland regained its independence from Imperial Russia.

== Background ==
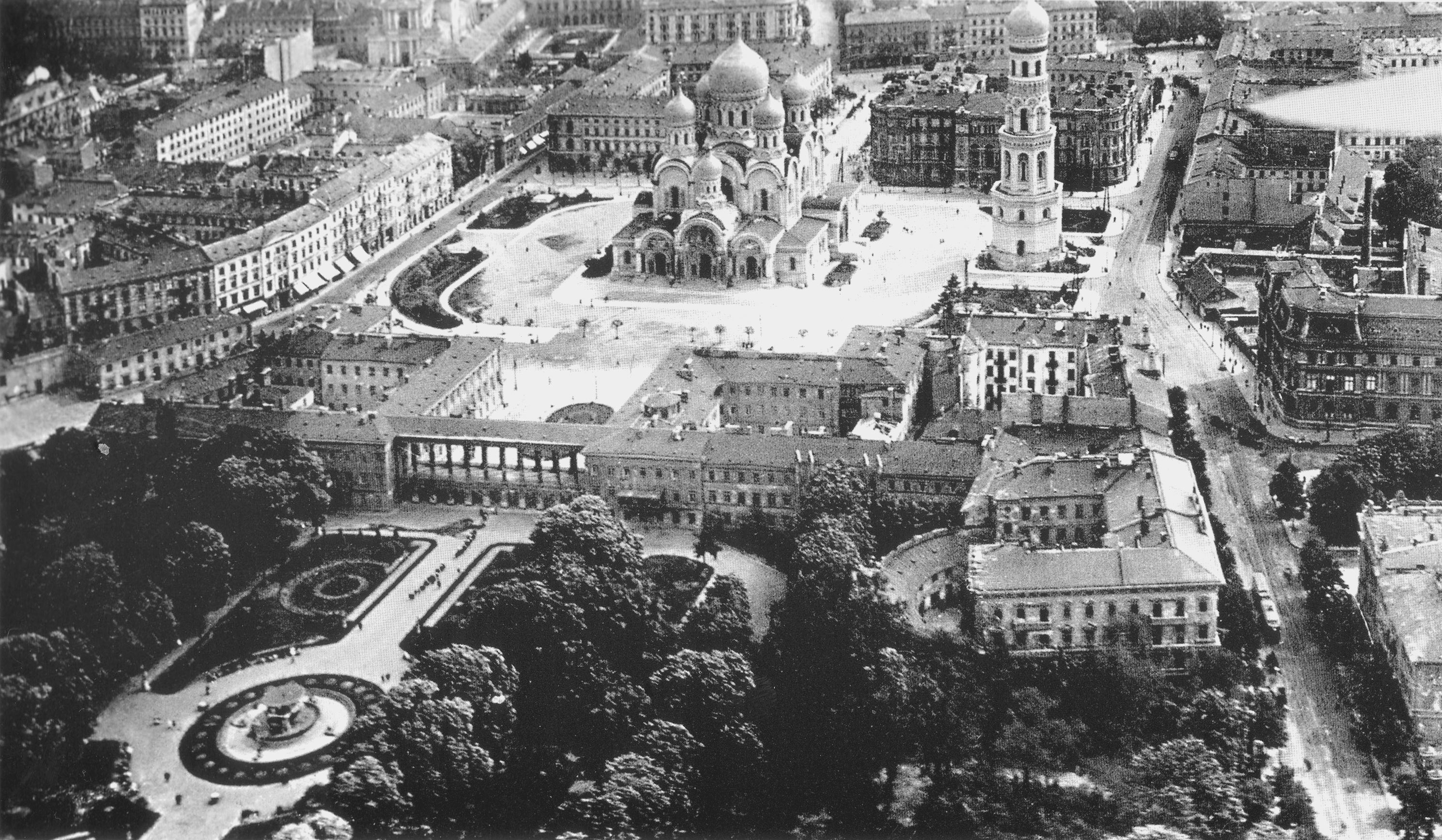
Saxon Square as seen from the air in 1919.

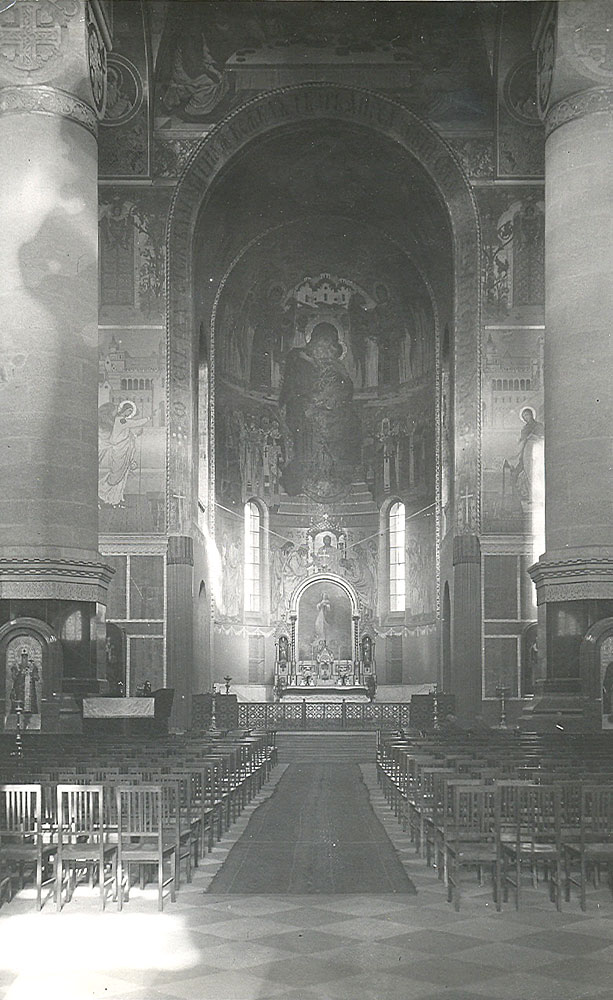
Interior of the cathedral as it appeared in 1915, after retreating Russians removed many of the decorations. Note the chairs in the hall, showing the Cathedral in use as a Lutheran church by the German army. Worshippers do not sit in Russian Orthodox churches.

Warsaw became capital city of the new Congress Kingdom of Poland in 1815 (federated with the Russian Empire), following the territorial rearrangements decided at the Congress of Vienna. The former capital of the "old" Kingdom of Poland, which ceased to exist in 1795 following the Partitions of Poland, became a major administrative center in the Empire, and one of its largest cities. By the second half of the 19th century, Warsaw housed a large Russian military garrison as a result of two failed uprisings against Russian rule. These developments were accompanied by a significant influx of Russian soldiers and officials into the city, most of them of the Russian Orthodox faith. Nearly 20 Russian Orthodox churches were built in Warsaw in the 1890s, primarily to accommodate the needs of the military.

The idea of building a large Orthodox cathedral in Warsaw was expressed in a letter from the Governor General of Poland, Joseph Vladimirovich Gourko, to Alexander III of Russia. He indicated that the Orthodox churches in Warsaw at that time were able to accommodate less than one tenth of the city's 42,000 Orthodox residents, who urgently needed a new place of worship.

== Construction ==
On August 28, 1893, a special committee for the construction of the new cathedral was organized, with Gourko as its head. The committee adopted the design proposed by Leon Benois and construction began in 1894. The place chosen as site of the cathedral was a monument raised by Russian authorities in memory of Polish generals who were executed in the November Uprising by Poles for collaborating with the Russian Empire.

Tsar Alexander III gave his approval to fund the cathedral on the date of the anniversary of the partitions of Poland in 1893 which was celebrated as the "joining of the West Russian state".

A significant part of the funds needed to build the cathedral were raised by personal donations from almost every corner of the Russian Empire. In an appeal to Moscow's residents, Gourko's chancellery wrote:

By its very presence ... the Russian Church declares to the world ... that in the western terrains along the Vistula, mighty Orthodox rule has taken root ... The appearance of a new ... church in Warsaw as a boundary and pillar of Orthodox Russia will animate the hopes of the Orthodox Slavs for unification under the Orthodox cross.

The rest of the funds came from mandatory donations required from all municipalities within Gourko's jurisdiction and special tax increases within the city of Warsaw . The mostly non-Russian-Orthodox population who had to provide these funds resented being forced to contribute, adding to the political controversy surrounding the project.

By 1900, the construction of the building was largely finished and on November 9, the Latin cross was erected on the main cupola. At the end of the construction, the 70-meter (230 feet), bell tower was the tallest building in Warsaw.

Work on the interior of the cathedral, designed by Nikolay Pokrovsky, continued for another 12 years. The frescoes were painted by Viktor Vasnetsov. The cathedral was decorated with 16 mosaic panels designed by Vasnetsov and Andrei Ryabushkin. The decorations of the cathedral used precious and semi-precious stones extensively, marble, and granite. The altar was decorated with jasper columns. The largest of the 14 bells was the fifth-largest in the empire.

On May 20, 1912, the ceremonial dedication of the cathedral to Alexander Nevsky was held, where Archbishop Nicholas of Warsaw said:

The creators of this cathedral had nothing hostile in their thoughts towards the unorthodoxy that surrounds us: coercion is not in the nature of the Eastern Orthodox Church

== Demolition ==
During World War I, the Russians evacuated from Warsaw in August 1915. They took with them most of the Orthodox inhabitants and clergy, as well as many precious works of art from the cathedral. During the German occupation in 1915–1918 the cathedral was used by the German military as a garrison church and renamed for St Henry. They appropriated the valuable copper roof, towards their war effort, leading to increasing water damage inside the church. They also made some alterations to the cathedral to suit their needs, such as adding a pipe organ and chairs for the worshippers, as a rule not found in Orthodox churches.

After Poland regained its independence in 1918, the fate of the cathedral was the subject of an intense debate for a number of years. It was perceived by the Polish inhabitants of Warsaw as a symbol of Russian domination and hence was very unpopular, and the Stefan Batory University Arts Faculty estimated it as having little artistic value.

There were proposals to make it into a Catholic church. Among other proposals, the famous Polish writer Stefan Żeromski argued that the Cathedral might be the best place for the Museum of the Martyrology of Polish people. Others argued on more utilitarian grounds that a church constructed as recently as 1912, and taking up valuable space in one of Warsaw's main squares, was not a significant enough work of architecture to be preserved, given that most of the Russian Orthodox believers had left the city when Russian rule ended.

In the end, despite a few protests, it was demolished in 1924–1926, along with all but two Orthodox churches in Warsaw. Adding to the political and nationwide character to the destruction of the largest Orthodox Cathedral in interwar Poland, the Warsaw magistrate issued public bonds to "give a chance to every Pole to take part in the action." The bonds were backed by the value of the materials recovered during demolition.

Occasional attempts to save the cathedral continued even while demolition was underway. For example, in the summer of 1924 an Orthodox member of the Polish Senate, Vyacheslav Bogdanovich, gave a passionate speech in favour of preserving the cathedral. However, overall such voices were few and far between. The proponents of its preservation in its original form were contemptuously called the "Cathedralists", thus implicitly accusing them of an underlying lack of patriotism.

The demolition itself was complex and required almost 15,000 controlled explosions. The process lasted multiple years, required multiple wrecking companies, and was fraught with failure. In 1925, equipment was imported from Germany to bore holes in the masonry for explosives, but a detonation in October 1925 failed to destroy the cathedral. According to the Los Angeles Times, the failure that year resulted in criticism of the government. Much of the high-quality marble obtained during the demolition was reused in the decoration of various Warsaw buildings. The mosaics were carefully disassembled and some of them taken to the Orthodox cathedral in Baranowicze (Baranavichy). After many years of storage in the National Museum in Warsaw, other fragments were installed in the Mary Magdalene Orthodox Cathedral in the Warsaw suburb of Praga.

== See also ==
- Alexander Nevsky
- Other Alexander Nevsky Cathedrals
- Field Cathedral of the Polish Army, another cathedral in Warsaw that used to be an Orthodox church
- Warsaw Palace of Culture and Science, a monumental building in central Warsaw, constructed by the Soviet Union in the Polish People's Republic.
- Palace of the Republic, Berlin, the now demolished seat of parliament of the former German Democratic Republic
- St. Florian's Cathedral
- Cathedral of Christ the Saviour in Moscow, demolished and rebuilt later
