= Church of Our Lady the Merciful =

- Church of the icon of Our Lady the Merciful
- Церковь иконы Божией Матери Милующей (Russian)
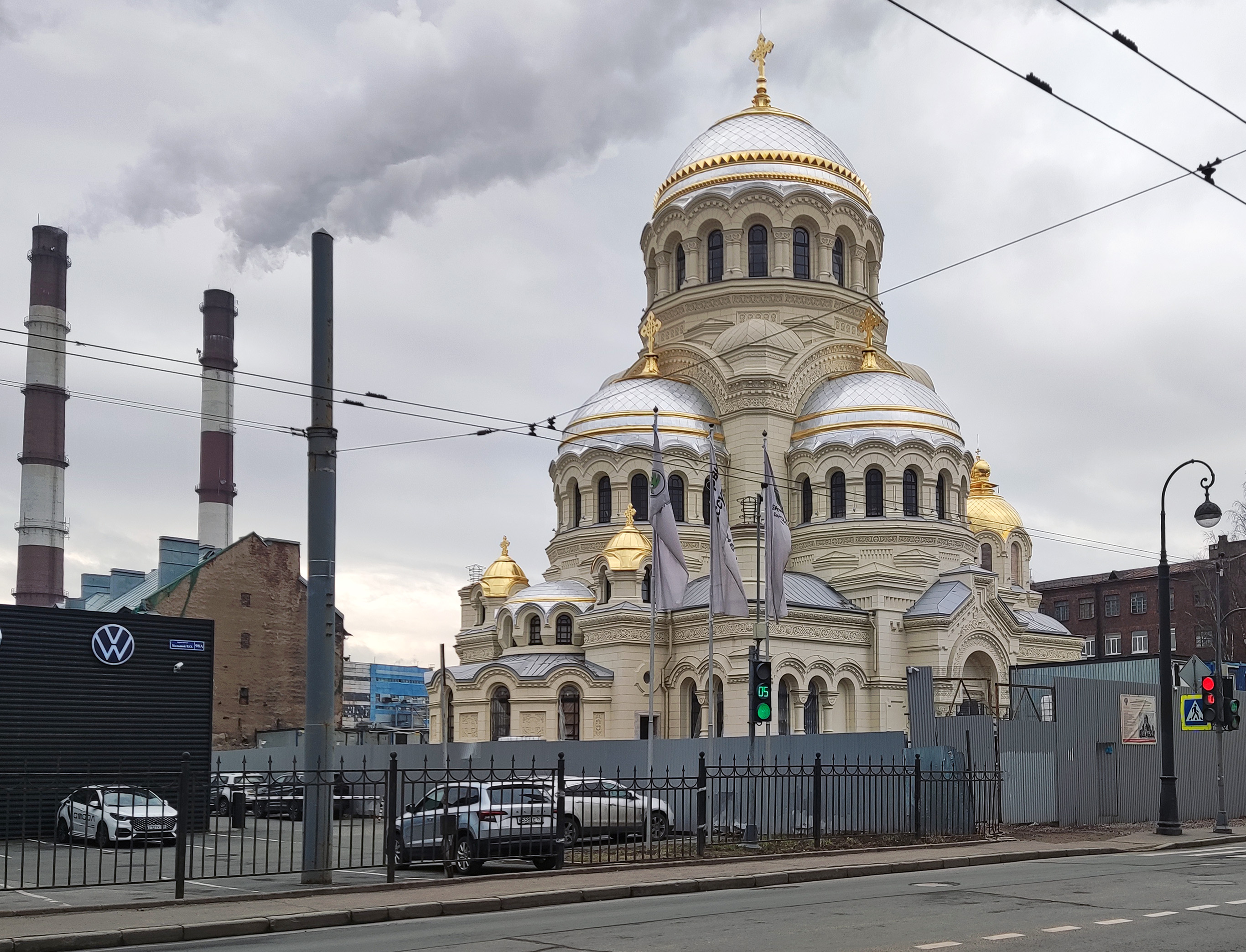

- Location in Saint Petersburg
- 59°55′39″N 30°14′42″E
- Location: St. Petersburg
- Country: Russia
- Denomination: Russian Orthodox
- Website: sobory.ru

History
- Former name: 1822
- Status: Church
- Founded: 1887
- Founder: Russian Naval Establishment
- Dedicated: October 25, 1898

Architecture
- Functional status: former navy swimming pool
- Architect(s): Vasily Kosyakov (lead architect); Dmitry Prussak
- Style: Late Neo-Byzantine
- Closed: June 2, 1932

Specifications
- Height: 42 metres (138 ft) top of dome
- Materials: Stone and brick

Administration
- Deanery: St. Petersburg and Ladoga Deanery
- Parish: Vasileostrovsky District of St. Petersburg

The Church of Our Lady the Merciful (Russian: Церковь иконы Божией Матери «Милующая»), is a Russian Orthodox Church in St Petersburg, Russia currently under restoration. It is located in the Vasileostrovsky District, on Vasilievsky Island, at the address 100, Bolshoi Prospekt. During Soviet times the building was used as a training center for naval rescue divers. The church was the prototype for the Naval Cathedral in Kronstadt. The government began the process of return to the Diocese of St. Petersburg of the Russian Orthodox Church in 2006 and the official process was concluded in 2012. It is under restoration to its original use.

== History ==
The area where the cathedral is situated was in the 19th century a suburb in which cargo port workers lodged. The workers in the area required a place of worship, so the community began to raise money for it, the first major contributor was Matfei Kenin, captain of the Port Rowing. By the end of the 19th century enough funds had been raised for construction to begin.

=== Erection of a building ===
In 1886, the petition for construction was raised. In 1887, the church project was approved, to be led by Vasily Kosyakov (lead architect) and Dmitry Prussak (Russian: Дмитрий Константинович Пруссак). On the church site, a wooden chapel was constructed, and in it was placed an icon of Our Lady the Merciful, brought from Athos, Greece.

On June 11, 1887, the consecration of the site took place. The site was a boggy district, so in 1888 under the direction of F.S.Kharlamov, an embankment was built and efforts were made to strengthen the soil under the foundation. In 1889, a church bookmark was consecrated; by this time, the base and a part of the walls had already been built.

In the autumn of 1892, the roof was installed, with the iron needed for it donated by philanthropist Countess Nadezhda Stenbock-Fermor. In 1894, the crosses were placed on the domes. Furnishing of the interior continued until 1917.

After the completion of construction, the church was consecrated in the name of the Mother of God the Merciful, on October 25, 1898.

In 1903, the belltower was topped with a gold crown.

Around the church grounds there was metal fencing on a granite base, and surrounding the building there was a garden. When the church opened, a charitable society was formed, which worked with the local children's shelter, an almshouse, and an orphan school.

The church has a height of about 42 meters, making the building one of the most dominant in the area. Using experience gained here, architect Vasiliy Kosyakov went on to construct the Naval Cathedral in Kronstadt in 1913.

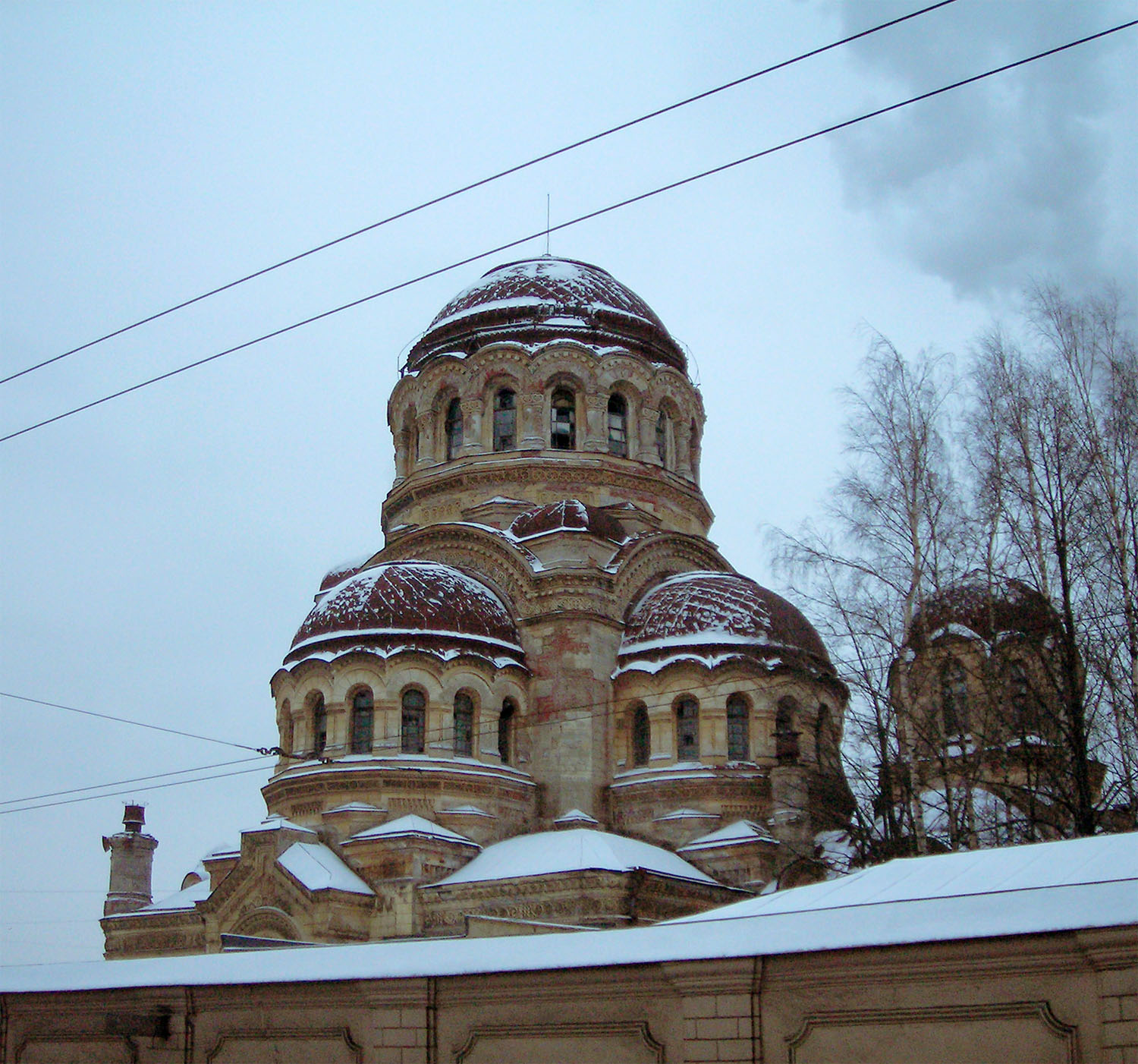
The building in 2008; at the right, behind the branches, is a belltower

The church design influenced the design of Alexander Nevsky Cathedral in Novosibirsk, built a few years later.

=== Further history of the building ===
In June 1932 the church was closed by the Soviet regime and ownership transferred to a naval submarine diving training group.

In the beginning of the 21st century there were negotiations about the transfer of the building to the Russian Orthodox Church. The command of the naval engineering service division (Russian: Отделение Морской Инженерной Службы (ОМИС)) has suggested that the Russian Orthodox Church should, in exchange, construct a training facility for submariners. In February 2009 the Russian Ministry of Defence which owns the building, once again refused to leave the property. In 2009 a scandal occurred over a planned motor show near the church building. The Ministry of Defence of the Russian Federation officially returned the church to the Russian Orthodox Church in December 2012. The church was undergoing a complete internal and external restoration as of mid-2021.
