= Vyacheslav Bogdanovich =

Belarusian politician (1878 – c. 1939)

Vyacheslav Vasilyevich Bogdanovich
- Вячаслаў Васілевіч Багдановіч
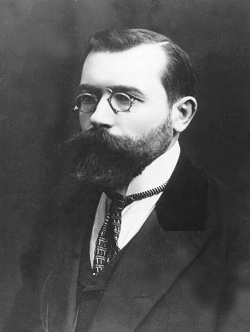

Senator of Poland in Vilnius
- In office 28 November 1922 – 30 August 1930

Personal details
- Born: 26 September 1878 Dzisna, Vilnius Governorate, Russian Empire
- Died: c. 1939
- Cause of death: Execution
- Party: Bloc of National Minorities
- Education: Kiev Theological Academy

Vyacheslav Vasilyevich Bogdanovich (Belarusian: Вячаслаў Васілевіч Багдановіч, Polish: Wiaczesław Bohdanowicz; 26 September 1878 – c. 1939) was a Belarusian publicist, politician, and religious figure.

== Biography ==
=== Early life ===
Vyacheslav Vasilyevich Bogdanovich was born on 26 September 1878 in Dzisna (present-day Belarus), then part of the Vilnius Governorate of the Russian Empire. He was the eldest son of an Orthodox priest. The family also raised Gennady and Anatoly, both teachers and part of the Belarusian intellectual elite. After graduating from school, Vyacheslav Bogdanovich entered the Vitebsk Orthodox Theological Seminary, which he did not graduate. He then entered the Kiev Theological Academy, where he studied philology and theology, researching 19th-century Russian-language preaching. On 12 June 1903, Bogdanovich received his diploma of candidate of theology. However, he did not pursue further degrees at the Academy and returned to Vitebsk to work as a teacher of biblical and church history. Additionally, he worked as a music teacher. The future senator also took part in elections to the State Duma, supporting the candidacy of historian Alexey Sapunov.

=== Theologian in Vilnius ===
In 1907, Bogdanovich was appointed inspector of the Minsk Theological Academy and later the Vilnius Theological Seminary. At that time he was a member of the Lithuanian diocesan school council and acted as guard of the diocesan repository of ancient treasures. Additionally, Bogdanovich was the treasurer and head of the pilgrimage department of the Vilnius Holy Spirit Brotherhood, editing one of its bulletins. In 1915, during the First World War, the theological seminary was evacuated to Ryazan, where Bogdanovich resumed his duties. He returned to Vilnius after the war, becoming a rector of the revived seminary. Bogdanovich acted as a delegate of the 1917–18 Local Council of the Russian Orthodox Church. In 1921 Bogdanovich became a leading member of the Belarusian School Society and the Vilnius Belarusian National Committee. Thanks to his efforts, a room was allocated for the newly established Vilnius Belarusian Gymnasium, where he briefly taught biblical law and mathematics.

Bogdanovich opposed the enforced autocephaly of the Polish Orthodox Church. Bogdanovich was consequently deprived of the posts of rector and editor, and then arrested and sent to Kraków to a Catholic monastery. However, under pressure from the public, Bogdanovich was quickly released. In 1922, together with Branislaw Tarashkyevich, Bogdanovich joined the Belarusian Deputy Club (Беларускі пасольскі клуб). A central election committee was formed, with Bogdanovich as its deputy chairman. Some sources suggest that Bogdanovich also proposed to create a bloc of Slavic minorities during the upcoming Sejm elections. The Bloc of National Minorities was officially established on 17 August 1922. Bogdanovich began his term as a senator of the Vilnius district on 28 November.

=== Senator ===
Bogdanovich was actively engaged in Orthodox matters, constantly responding to reports of anti-Orthodox politics in Poland. He defended the Zhyrovichy Monastery from Catholic attacks, and spoke against the destruction of the St. Alexander Nevsky Cathedral in 1924. Some sources also contain information that at the end of the 1920s, Bogdanovich intended to organize a second parish in the village of Sutkavo in the Smorgon region, which would not be subject to the Warsaw metropolis, but this project was never implemented. Bogdanovich often wrote on literature and philosophy in Russian magazines and newspapers in Poland.

In 1927, Bogdanovich started publishing the Belarusian-language magazine Orthodox Belarus, being its only author. Under his own name and also pseudonyms, Bogdanovich wrote of relations between the church and state, issues of conciliarism and autocephaly, relations between Orthodoxy in other Eastern European countries and Poland, and so on. In the third issue of the magazine, the program and charter of the Orthodox Belarusian Democratic Union were printed. In the unification program, it was proposed to separate the church from the state. Bogdanovich viewed the USSR as an extreme form of socialism, which itself strives to become a religion.

Bogdanovich was elected as councilor of the Vilnius city council on 19 June 1927. A month later, Bogdanovich became chairman of the Belarusian National Committee. Bogdanovich organized an event for the 500th anniversary of the death of the Grand Duke Vytautas of Lithuania. As a senator, Bogdanovich was one of the founders and heads of the Vilnius branch of the Belarusian Institute of Economy and Culture. Described as a great musician, Bogdanovich put to music several poems by Belarusian poets such as Yanka Kupala and Natallia Arsiennieva. Bogdanovich emphasized preserving the Church Slavonic language in liturgical practice and sought the subordination of the Polish Orthodox Church to the Moscow Patriarchate.

=== Later years and death ===
After failing to secure a seat for the senate, with a low salary, Bogdanovich became a literature teacher at a Russian gymnasium in Vilnius, where he would work until 1939. Bogdanovich was remembered not only as an excellent teacher, but also as an organizer of a theater group, decorator and costume designer, and director of numerous performances and concerts based on the works of Russian classics. In 1935 Bogdanovich left the Belarusian National Committee in protest due to their excessive influence on the organization of young members of the Belarusian Christian Democracy party.

During the start of the Second World War on 1 September 1939, Bogdanovich and other Belarusian and Ukrainian public figures were arrested by Polish authorities. Bogdanovich was interred at the Bereza Kartuska Prison, spending two weeks there. He and other inmates escaped on 17 September. He arrived in Soviet-occupied Vilnius on 26 September, where he wished to return to clerical and pedagogical work. On 17 October 1939, Bogdanovich was arrested by the NKVD. According to private testimony, Bogdanovich was executed in a prison in Vileyka.
