= Church of the Dormition of the Mother of God (Saint Petersburg) =

Russian Orthodox Church building in Saint Petersburg

Coordinates: 59°56′00″N 30°16′32″E

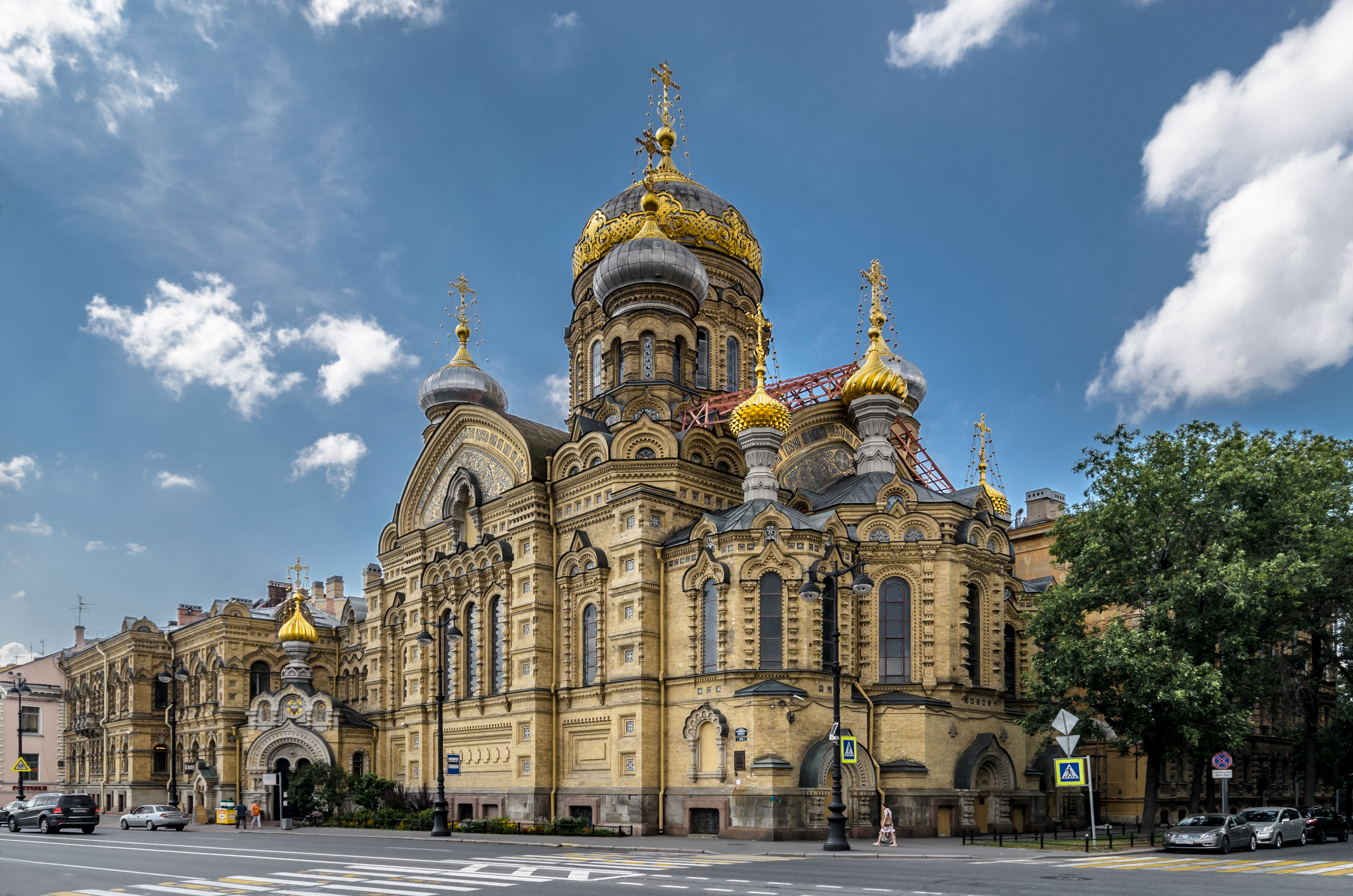
Church of the Dormition of the Mother of God

The Church of the Dormition of the Mother of God (Russian: Церковь Успения Пресвятой Богородицы) is a Russian Orthodox Church building in Saint Petersburg. Its construction started in 1894 when monks from the Kyiv Pechersk Lavra decided to expand the monastic branch of the monastery. Work on the construction lasted six years, and the church was designed in the neo-Byzantine style by Vasily Kosyakov.

== Construction ==
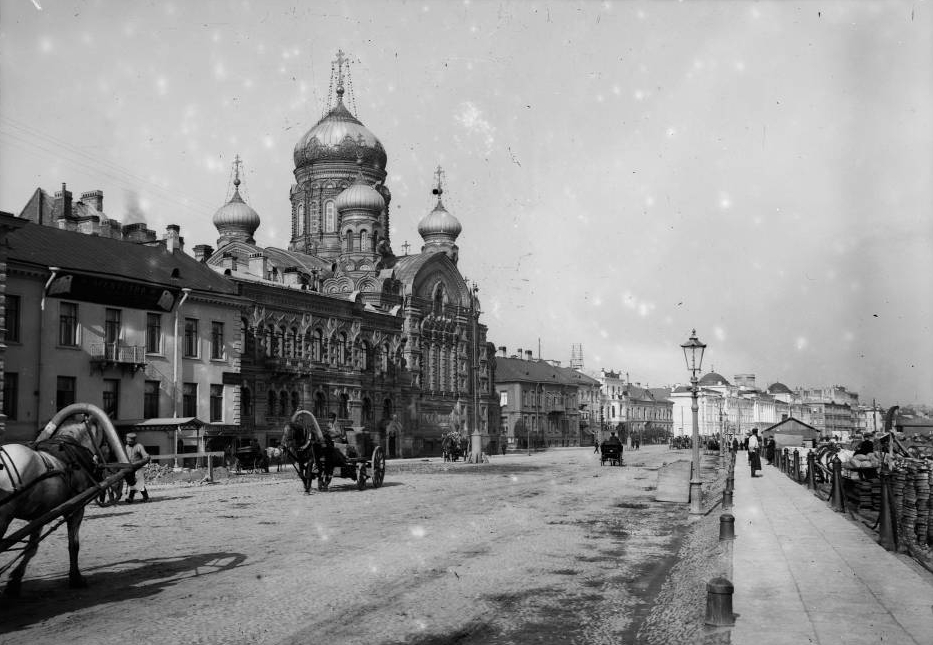
Photos of the courtyard and the temple (1900s)

Construction started 1895. Concrete was used instead of bricks to speed up construction of its main arches. In September 1896, a temporary church was erected inside the temple under construction, where services were constantly held. On September 14, 1897, crosses were placed on the domes. The main chapel was made in honor of the Assumption of the Blessed Virgin Mary, and was consecrated on December 18 1897. In the summer of 1898, the domes were gilded. In 1903, the church was completed.

=== 1900-1935 ===
In 1922, a chalice, a cross and an altar gospel were stolen from the altar of the church. Temple employees were accused of improper storage of this property. At the end of 1933 - beginning of 1934, another arrest took place where four priests who served in the church came under investigation. Six months later, on August 25, by the decision of the Leningrad Regional Executive Committee, the temple was closed, although services continued until January 23, 1935.

=== Soviet period ===
After the closure of the temple, the Leningrad military port became responsible for the church. In 1936, it was used as a sports hall. In 1956, a project developed by the Lengiproinzhproekt Institute involved using temple for the construction of the first indoor ice rink in Leningrad. This led to several paintings being destroyed. The ice rink was decorated with portraits of Lenin. The opening of the rink took place in 1961.
