= Alexander Nevsky Chapel, Fergana =

Chapel of Saint Alexander Nevsky
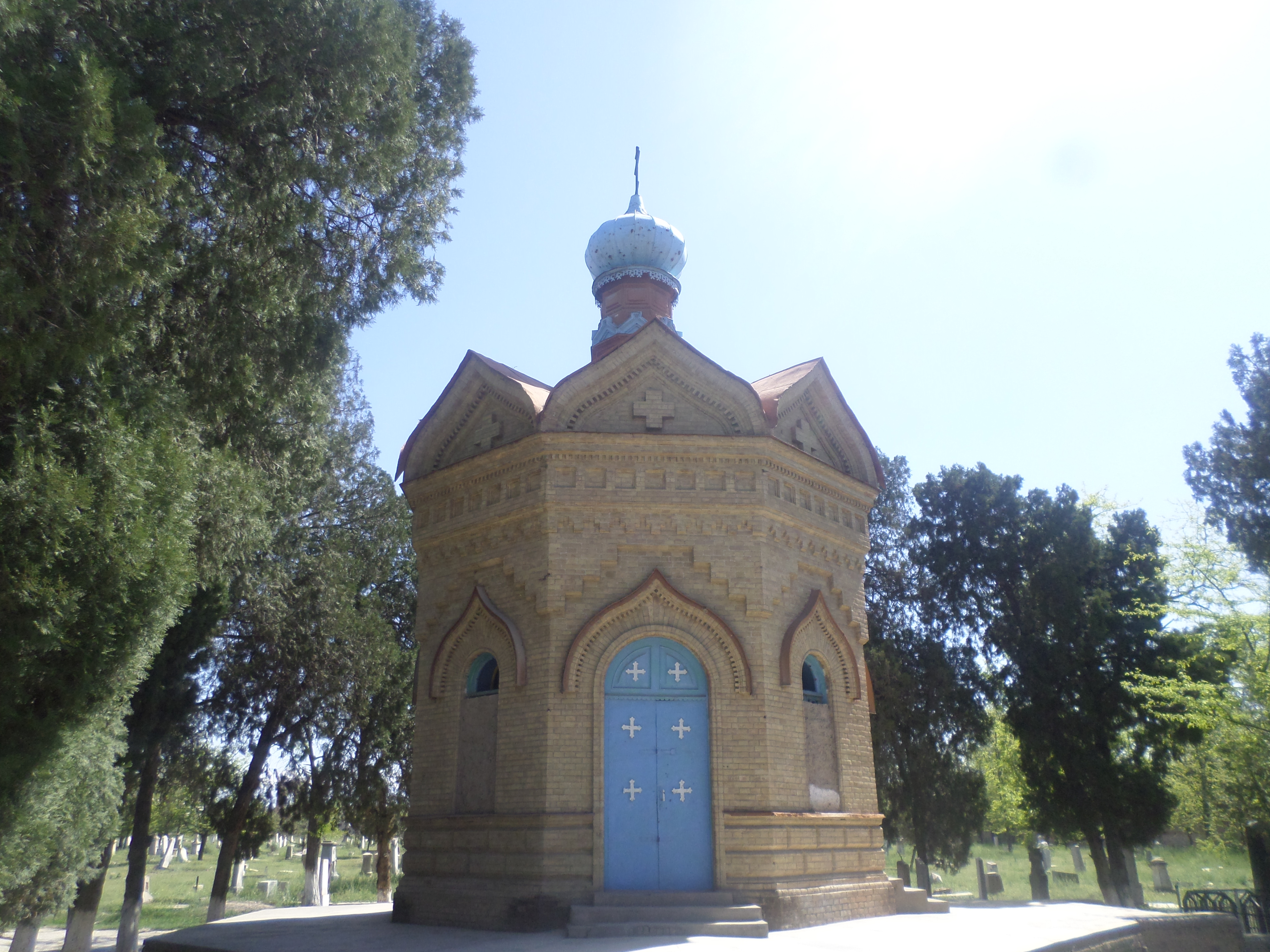
- Interactive map of the Chapel of Saint Alexander Nevsky area

General information
- Location: Fergana, Uzbekistan
- Coordinates: 40.33666°N 71.755141°E
- Construction started: 1892
- Closed: 1932
- Demolished: 1910

Technical details
- Material: baked brick

Design and construction
- Architect: L. Burmeister

The Chapel of St. Alexander Nevsky is an inactive Orthodox chapel located in the city of Fergana. It was at the edge of the Russian cemetery with a sky-blue dome and an entrance gate with the same color. It was built in memory of the Russian soldiers who died in the Andijan uprising of 1898.

Mausoleum was founded in 1891, chapel was built in 1892 with the project of L. Burmeister. The chapel was consecrated on 6 December 1892[2] in honor of Alexander Nevsky. Designed for 50 parishioners. It was closed in 1932. The building was not demolished. One priest was assigned to the chapel. The patronal holiday was set for December 6.

== History ==
In 1898, the Andijan Uprising took place in Uzbekistan, and Russian soldiers were killed in Fergana. They were all buried in the local Russian Orthodox cemetery, after which it was decided to build a chapel at the expense of the local treasury.

The chapel was built of baked bricks and also at the expense of the treasury. Inside, there were also signs with the names of all the dead lower ranks of the Russian fighter, which unfortunately did not survive. Its name was dedicated to the Great Martyr Prince Alexander Nevsky.

In 1910, an earthquake occurred, as a result of which the chapel partially collapsed from the roof. A year later, it was restored. In 1932, the chapel was closed. The building has been preserved by this day. But only memories remained from the cemetery.

== Gallery ==
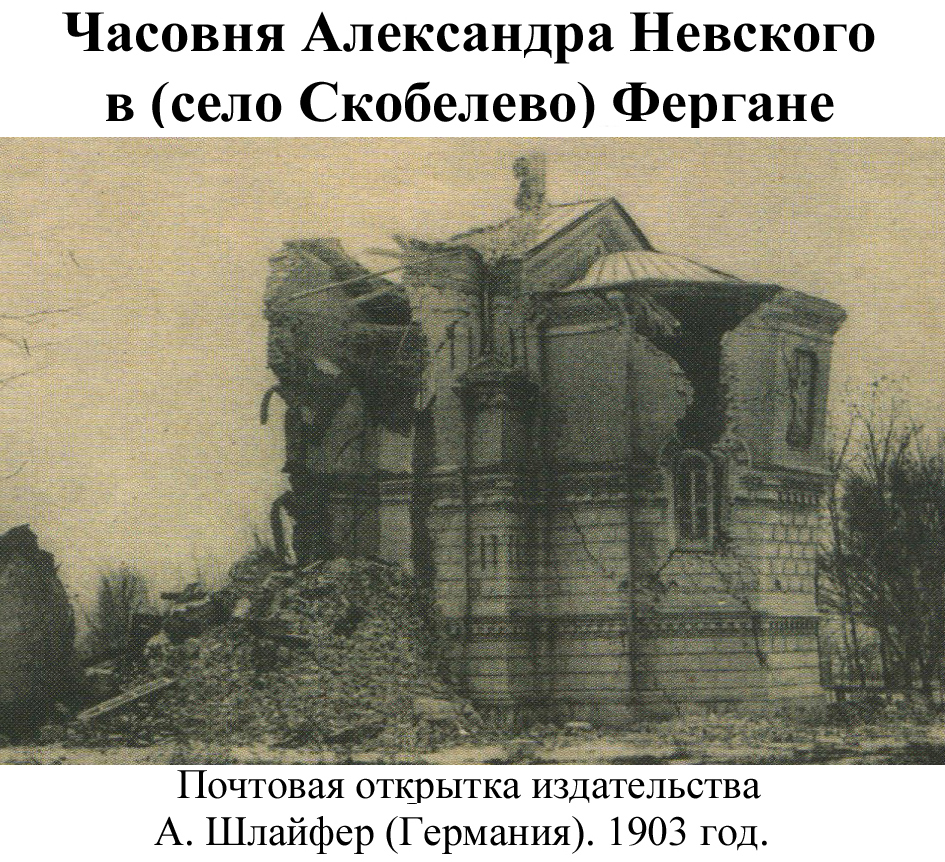
Orthodox cemetery

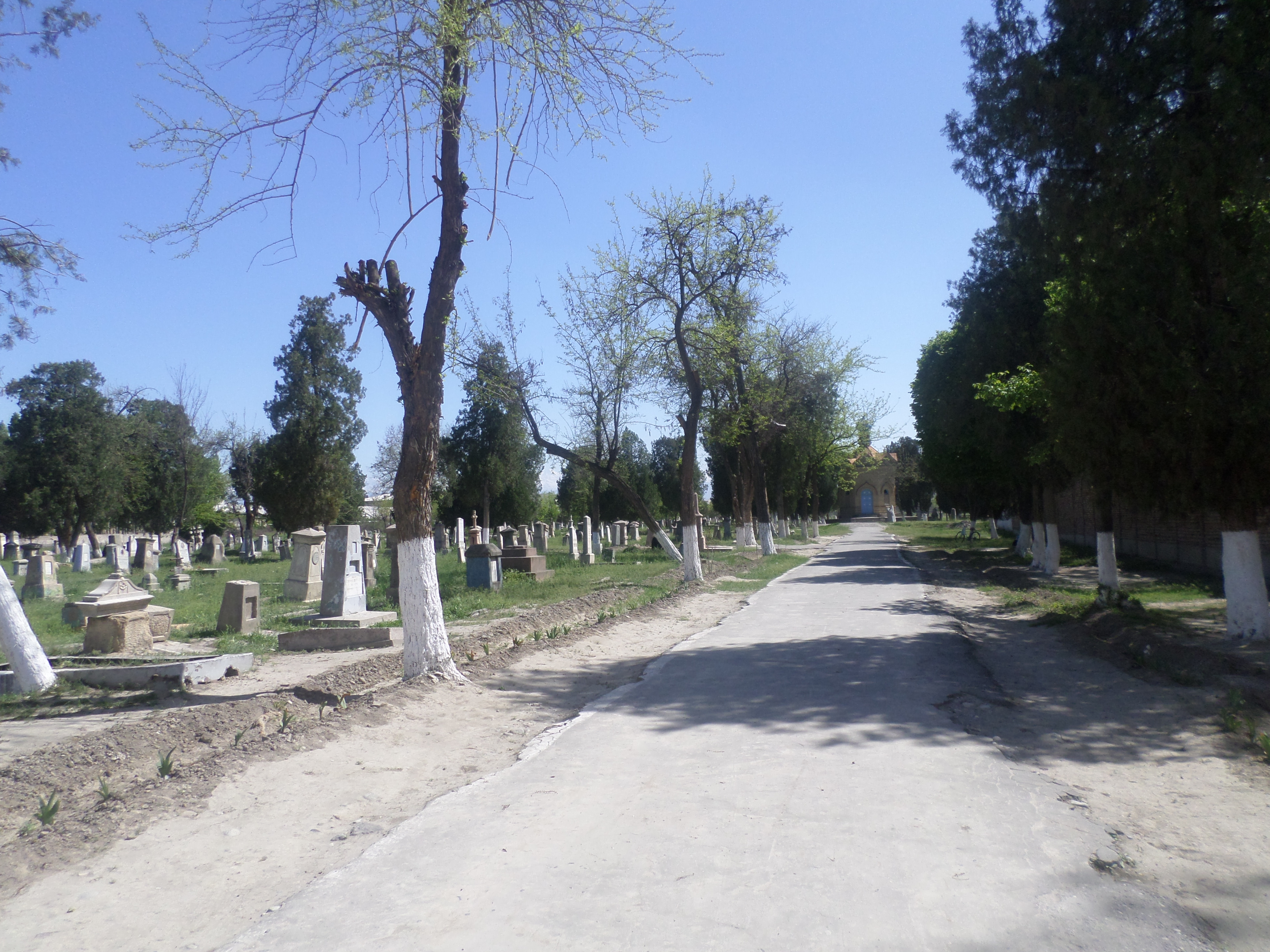
Chapel of Alexander Nevskogo

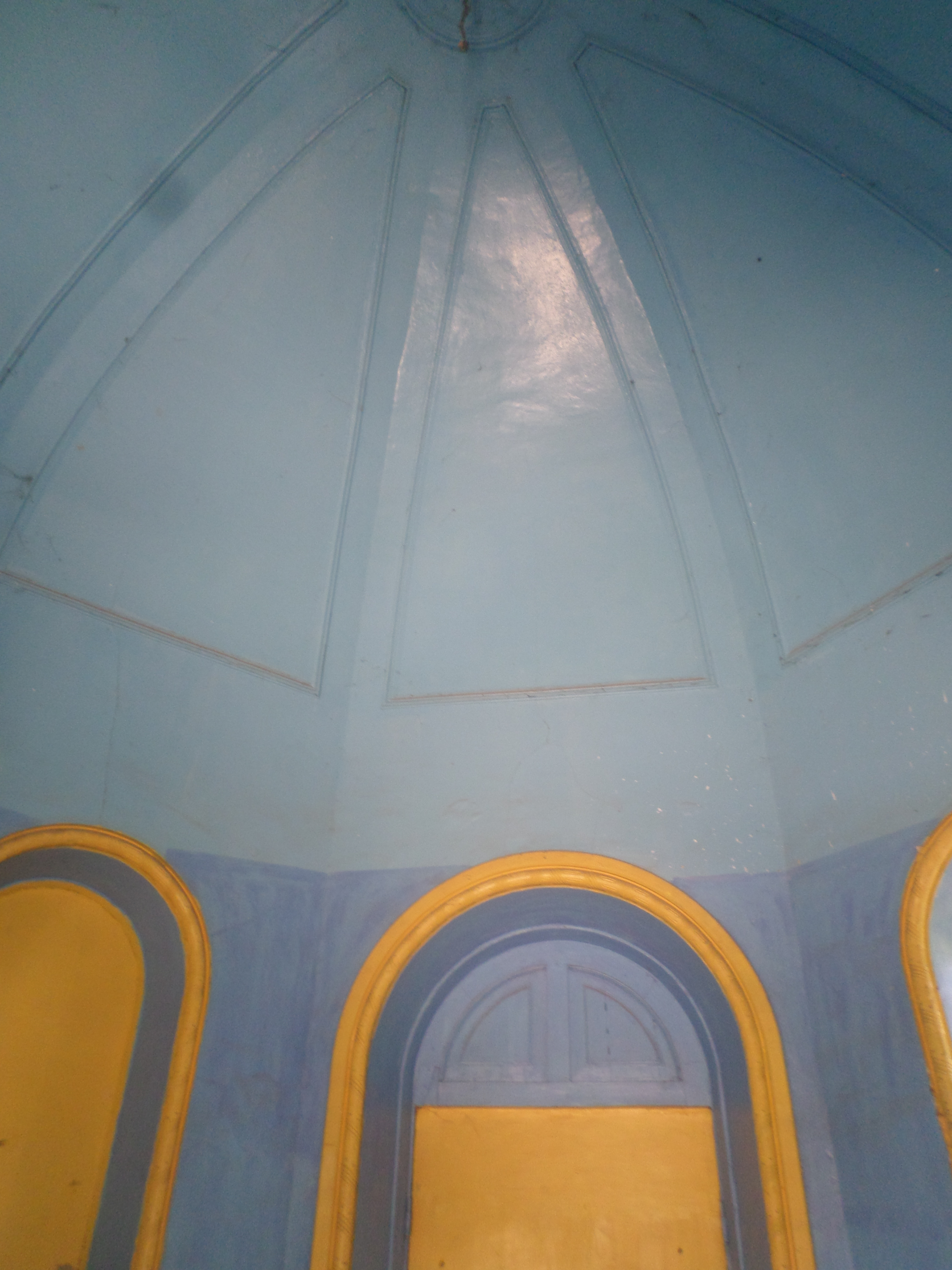
Inside of roof of chapel

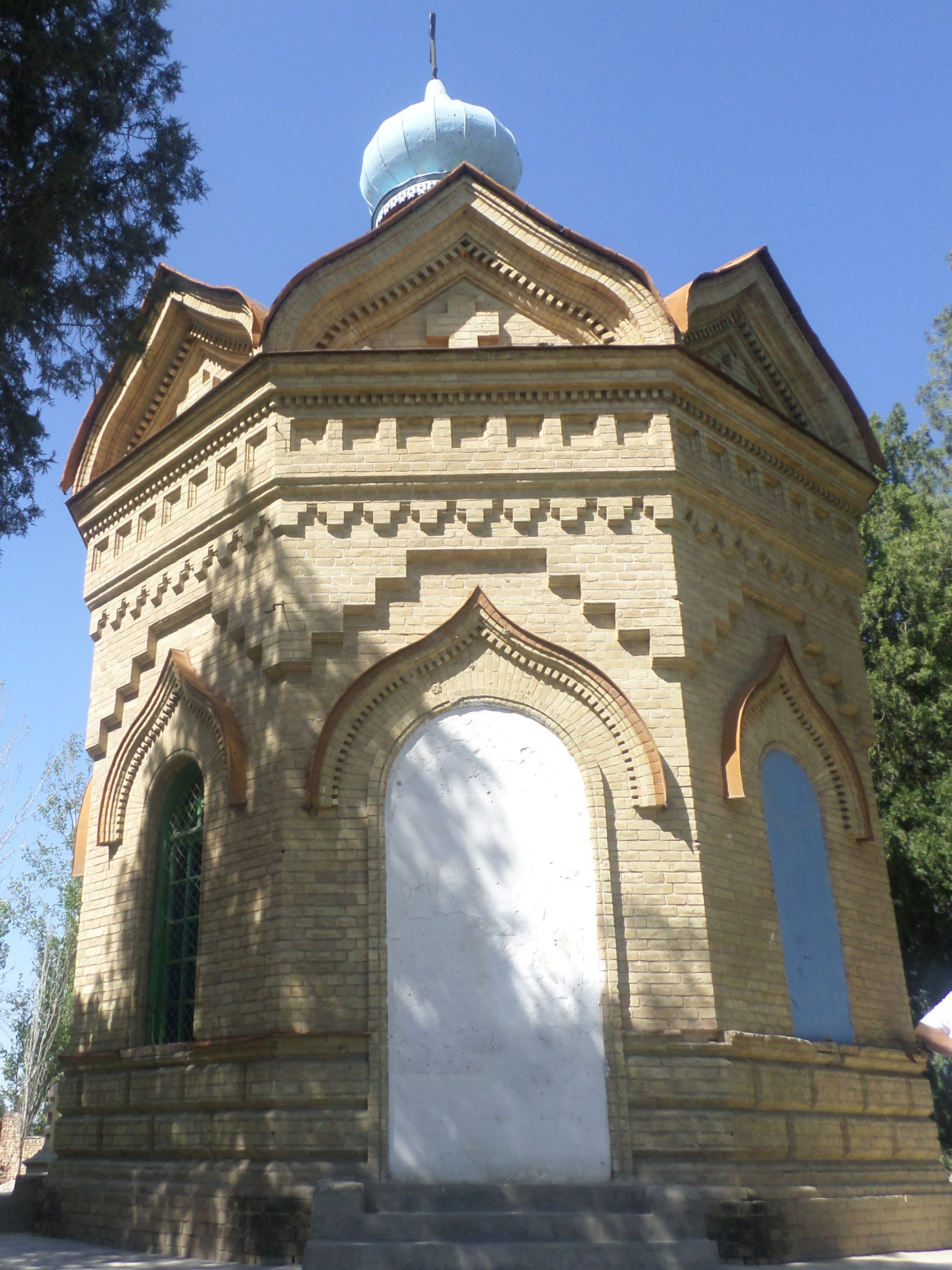
Mausoleum built in honor of dead Russian soldiers
