= St. Nicholas Naval Cathedral, Karosta =

Church in Liepaja, Latvia

St. Nicholas Cathedral
- The Naval Cathedral Church of Saint Nicholas
- Sv. Nikolaja Jūras katedrāle
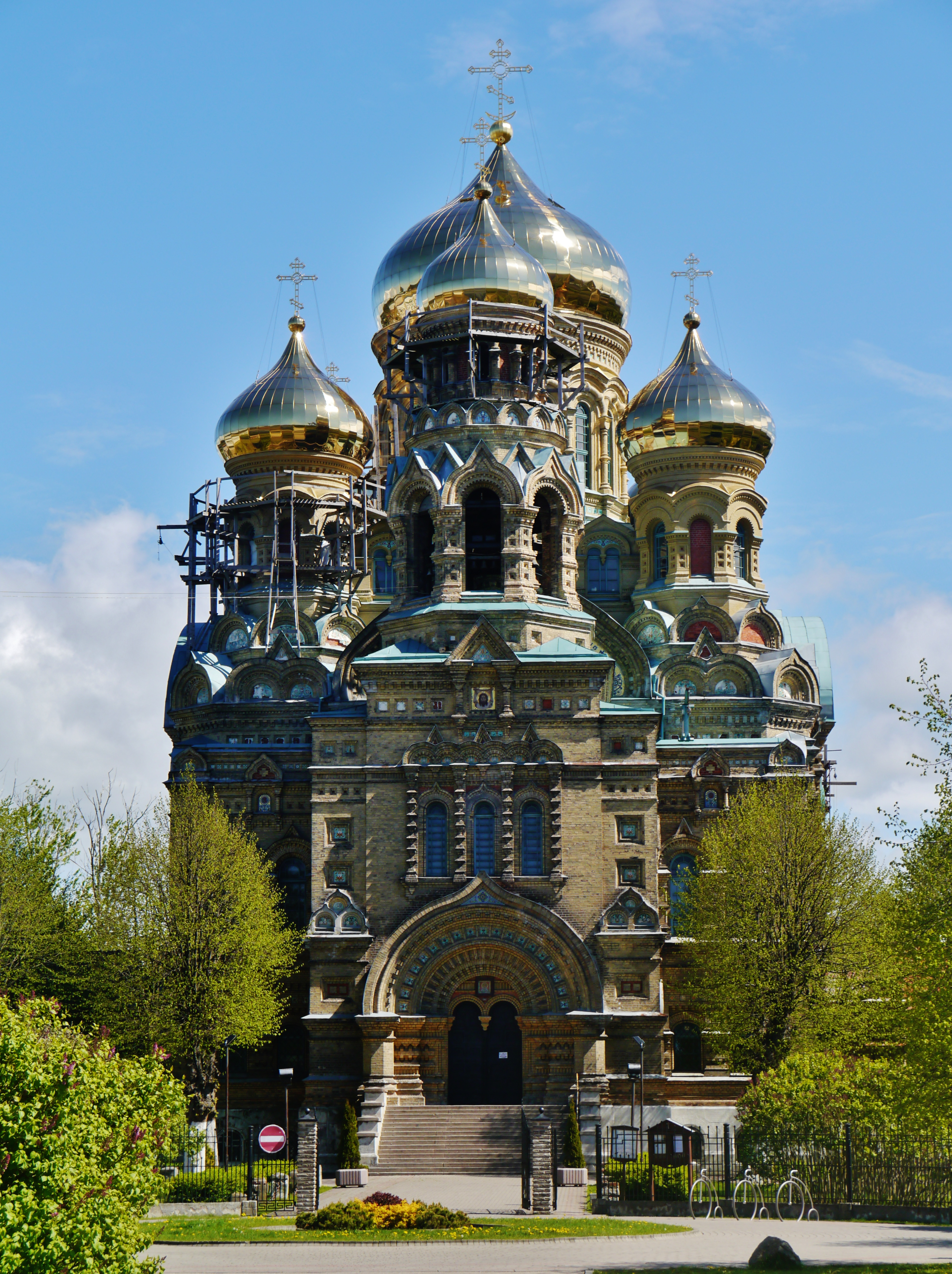
- St. Nicholas Cathedral
- 56°33′11″N 21°00′45″E
- Location: Liepāja
- Country: Latvia
- Denomination: Russian Orthodox Church

History
- Status: Active
- Founded: 1901
- Dedication: Saint Nicholas
- Dedicated: 1903

Architecture
- Functional status: Church
- Architect: Vasily Kosyakov
- Style: Russian Revival architecture
- Years built: 1901-1903
- Groundbreaking: 1901
- Completed: 1903
- Construction cost: ₽530,000

Specifications
- Capacity: 1,500 people

The St. Nicholas Naval Cathedral (Latvian: Sv. Nikolaja Jūras katedrāle) (Russian: Свято-Николаевский морской собор) is a Russian Orthodox cathedral church located in Karosta in the north of Liepāja, Latvia.

== Construction ==
The cathedral was built in the style of 17th century traditional Russian churches with a central dome representing Christ with 4 smaller domes representing the four evangelists on designs made by Vasily Kosyakov. It was built to serve as the cathedral church of the Russian navy stationed in Karosta. The cornerstone was laid in the presence of a number of dignitaries including Tsar Nicholas II of Russia. The cathedral was completed two years later in 1903 and was formally consecrated and dedicated to the patron saint of seafarers in the presence of the Tsar himself.

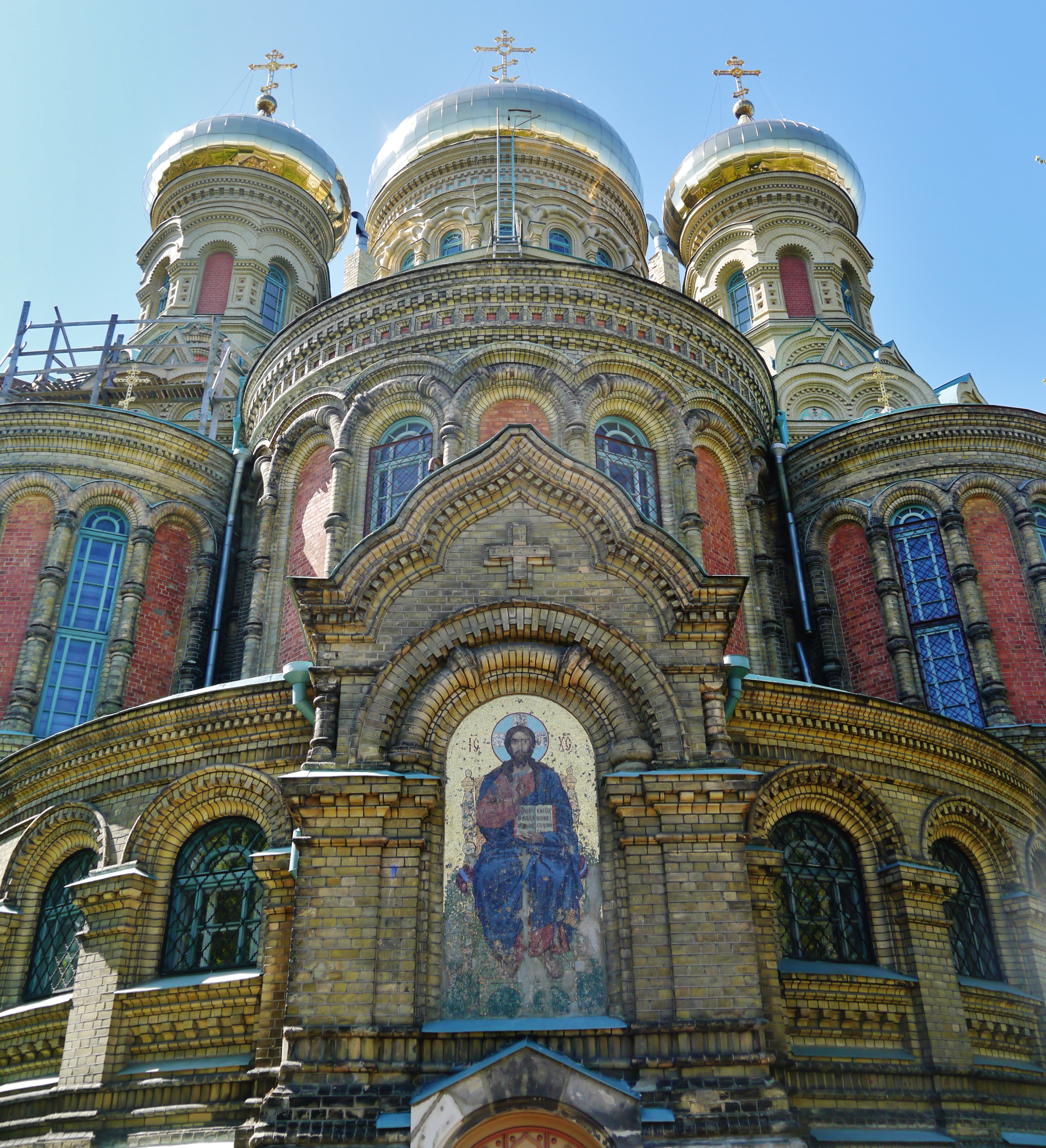
Detail of the back of the cathedral

== WWI ==
The cathedral's belongings, including bells and icons, were transported to Russia during the outbreak of WWI, for safe keeping. The rest of the items were stolen by the Germans who invaded Latvia. After independence in 1918, the church was converted into a Lutheran church to serve the Latvian navy personnel.

== Soviet Occupation ==
The cathedral continued to function as place of worship until the Soviet re-occupation of Latvia in 1944. The Soviets prohibited anyone entering the Karosta area which was turned into a secret Soviet navy territory. Consequently, the cathedral was converted into a gymnasium, a cinema and a recreation and entertainment room, referred to as the 'red corner' for the needs of sailors and soldiers. The interior of the central dome was closed to eliminate the acoustics which made it difficult for navy personnel to hear movies in the cinema.

== Independence ==
After Latvia's independence from the Soviet Union in 1991, the cathedral was given back to the Latvian Orthodox Church under the authority of the Russian Orthodox Church with the first service taking place that same year in December.

== Mosaics and Paintings ==
The mosaics were designed by V. Frolov, while the wood carvings and gilding of the iconostas were made by P. Abosimov. The paintings of the central and the right-side altar spheres were made by F. Railyan and the frescoes of the left-side altar spheres were painted by M. Vasilyev.
