= Karosta =

Neighbourhood of Liepaja, Latvia

Coordinates: 56°33′0″N 21°0′20″E

Original building plan

Karosta is a former Russian and Soviet naval base on the Baltic Sea, which today is a neighbourhood in Liepāja, Latvia. The base was built because, when the Hohenzollern Kingdom of Prussia merged into the German Empire in 1871, Nimmersatt became its northeasternmost settlement. Schoolchildren were taught the rhyme Nimmersatt, wo das Reich sein Ende hat, meaning "Nimmersatt, where the Empire ends". The village included a customs house and an inn (Kurhaus) providing shelter for travellers from and to the Russian Empire's Lithuanian provinces. Liepaja was the westernmost port.

== History ==
The naval base was originally constructed in 1890–1906 for Tsar Alexander III of Russia, and named Port Imperatora Aleksandra III (Russian: Порт Императора Александра III, lit. 'Port of Alexander III'). Built on the bare coast it consisted of a large man-made harbour including a large breakwater and inland submarine base.

After Latvian independence in the aftermath of World War I, the base was called Kara osta ('War Port' in Latvian), later shortened to Karaosta and Karosta (Russian: Кароста).

It was a closed military area and army town during the Soviet period, serving as a base for the Soviet Baltic Fleet. It was inaccessible to the civilians of neighbouring Liepāja.

When the Soviet Union military left Latvia in 1994 after the restoration of Latvian independence, Karosta became largely uninhabited and most structures fell to ruin. In late 1990s, the area was troubled by high unemployment, street crime and drug problems. It is today a neighbourhood in the northern outskirts of Liepāja in Latvia, occupying a third of the area of the city.

== Today ==
Today, Karosta is a popular place for tourists and artists, who are attracted to its historical sights, such as the scenic seascapes with partially blasted fortresses on the Baltic shore. The K@2 Artists center was established in 2000 and acts as a frame for many cultural activities by local and foreign artists who come to Karosta for art projects and to get inspiration from Karosta’s nature, buildings, ruins, and people.

The army headquarters include czar-era mansions used by admirals, a palace for the czar (reportedly only used once), an impressive Russian Orthodox Naval Cathedral, as well as underground bunkers and abandoned storehouses. Soviet-era buildings include many rows of block housing. At its height Karosta was home to over 20,000 people. Karosta military prison has now been converted into a museum (open May - September) and it is possible to spend the night in the guardhouse, processed as a prisoner would have been.

== Gallery ==
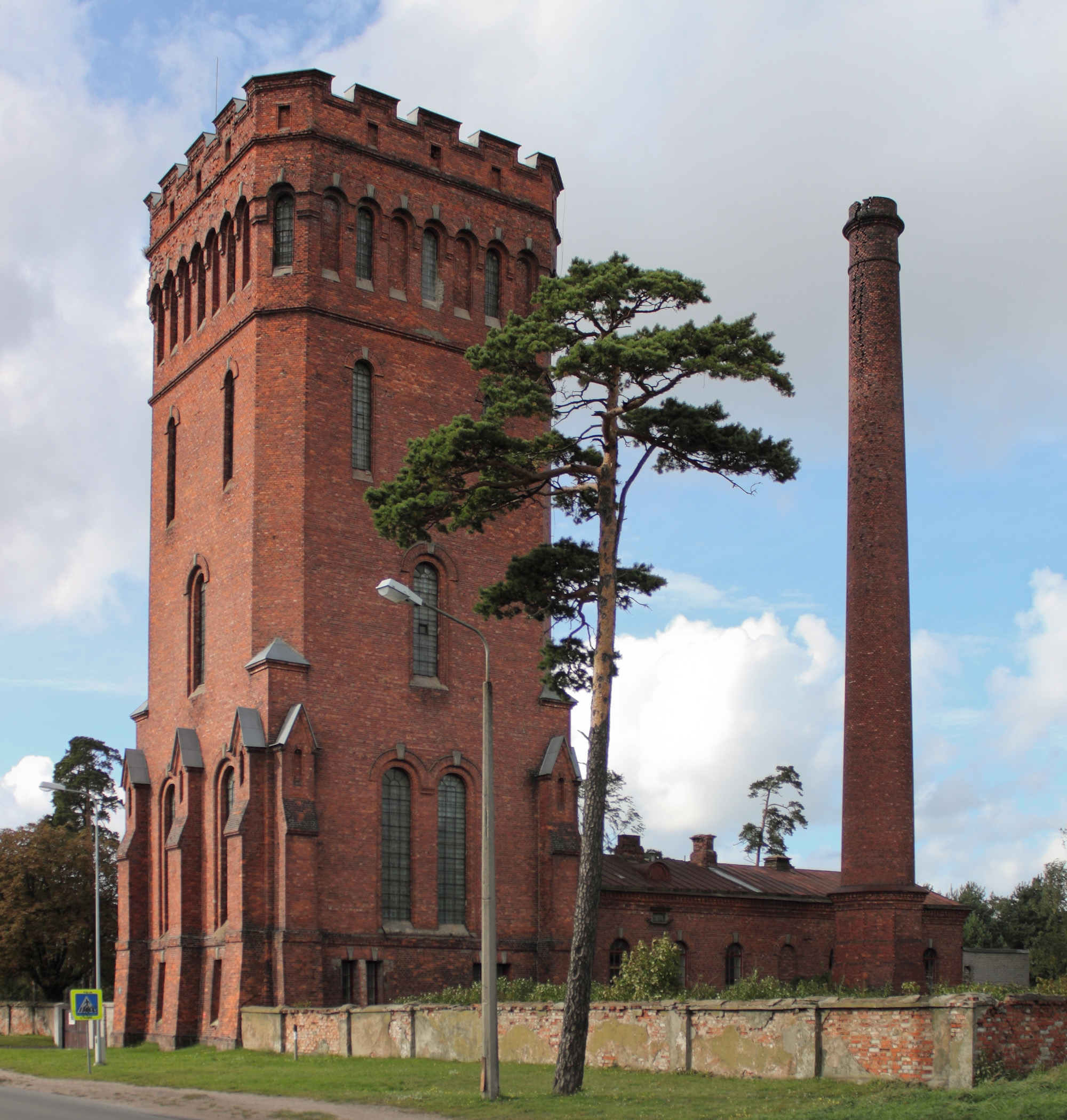
The old water tower

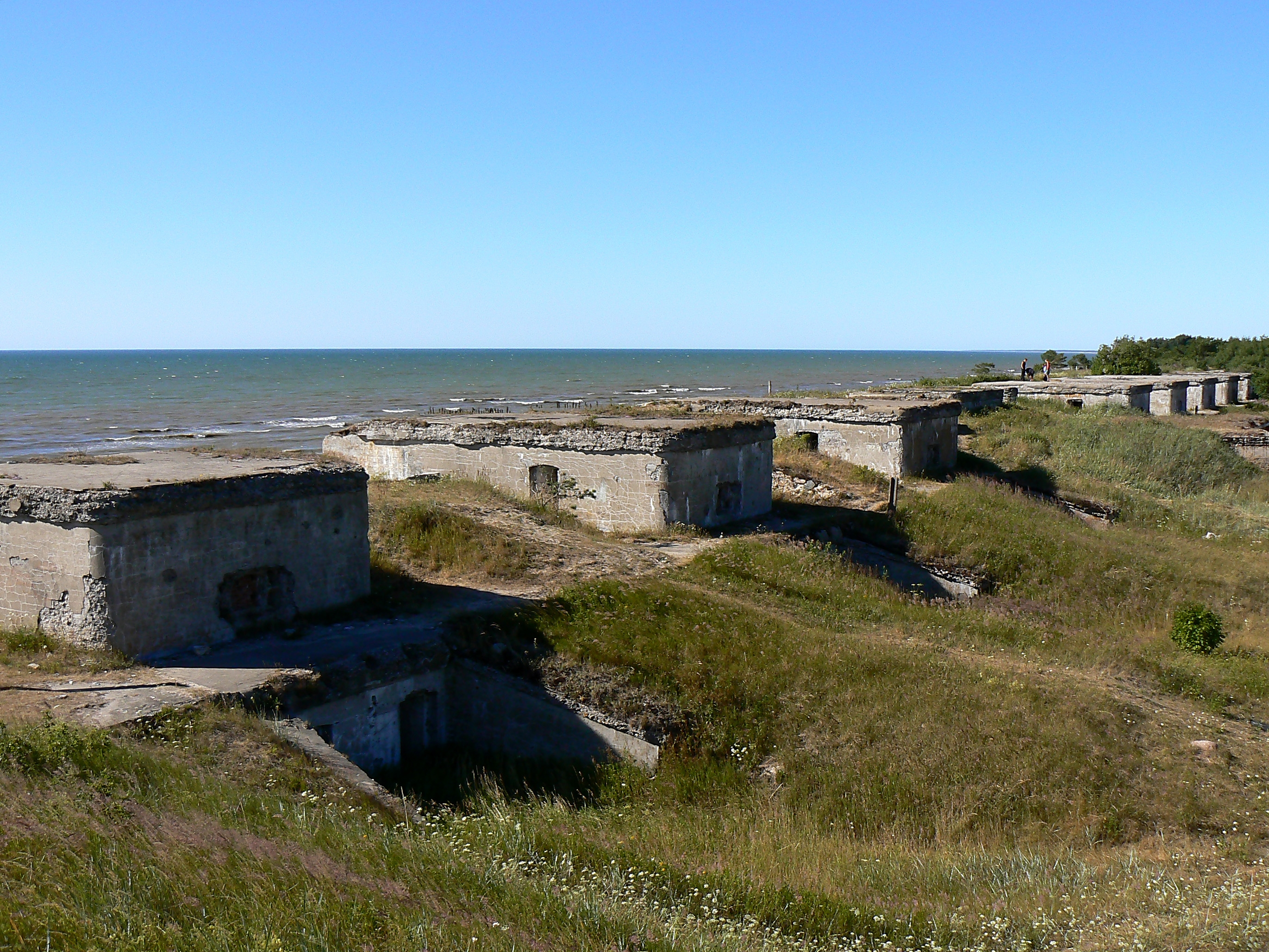
The first battery of the north forts

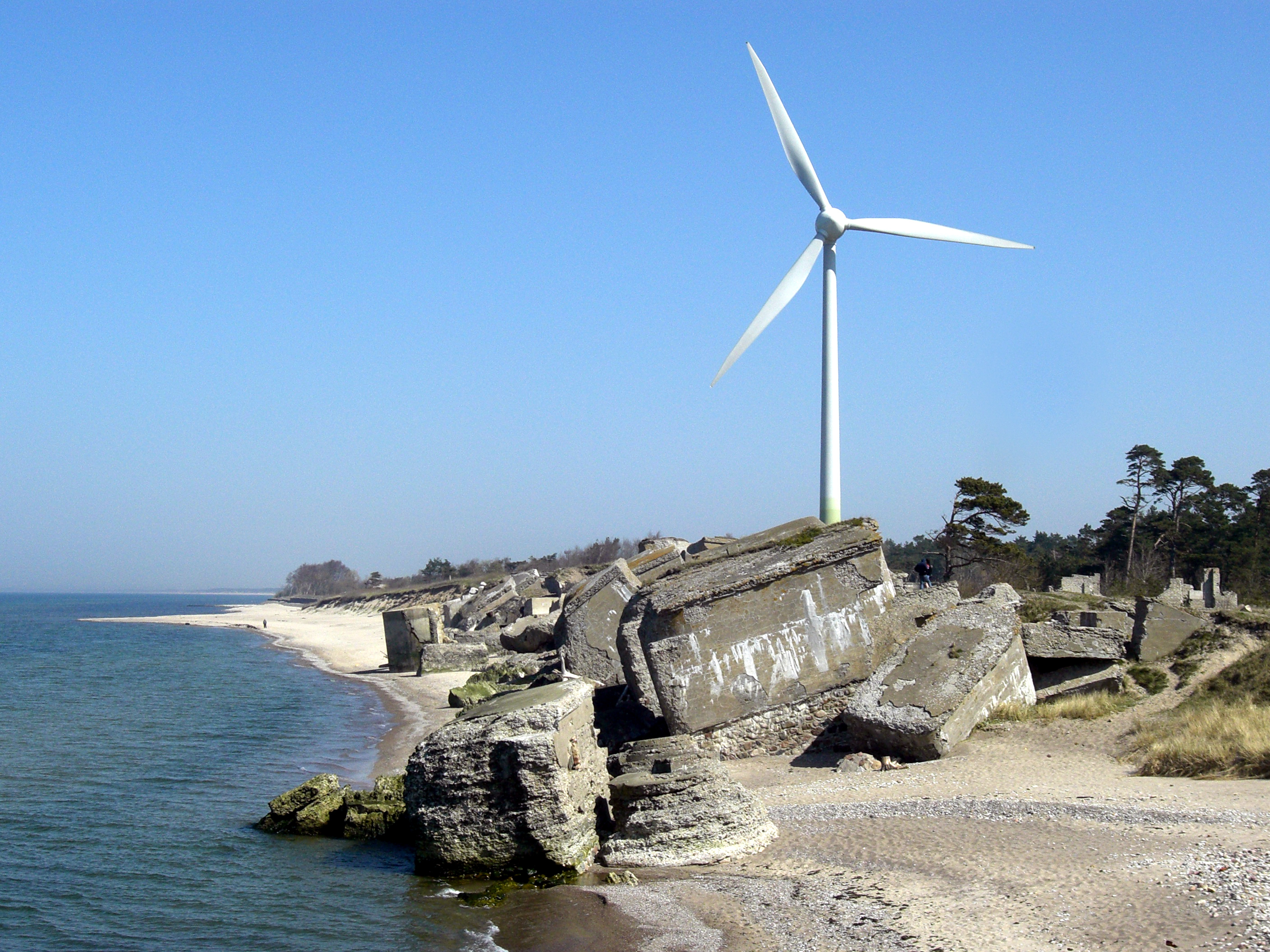
Ruins of the Northern forts

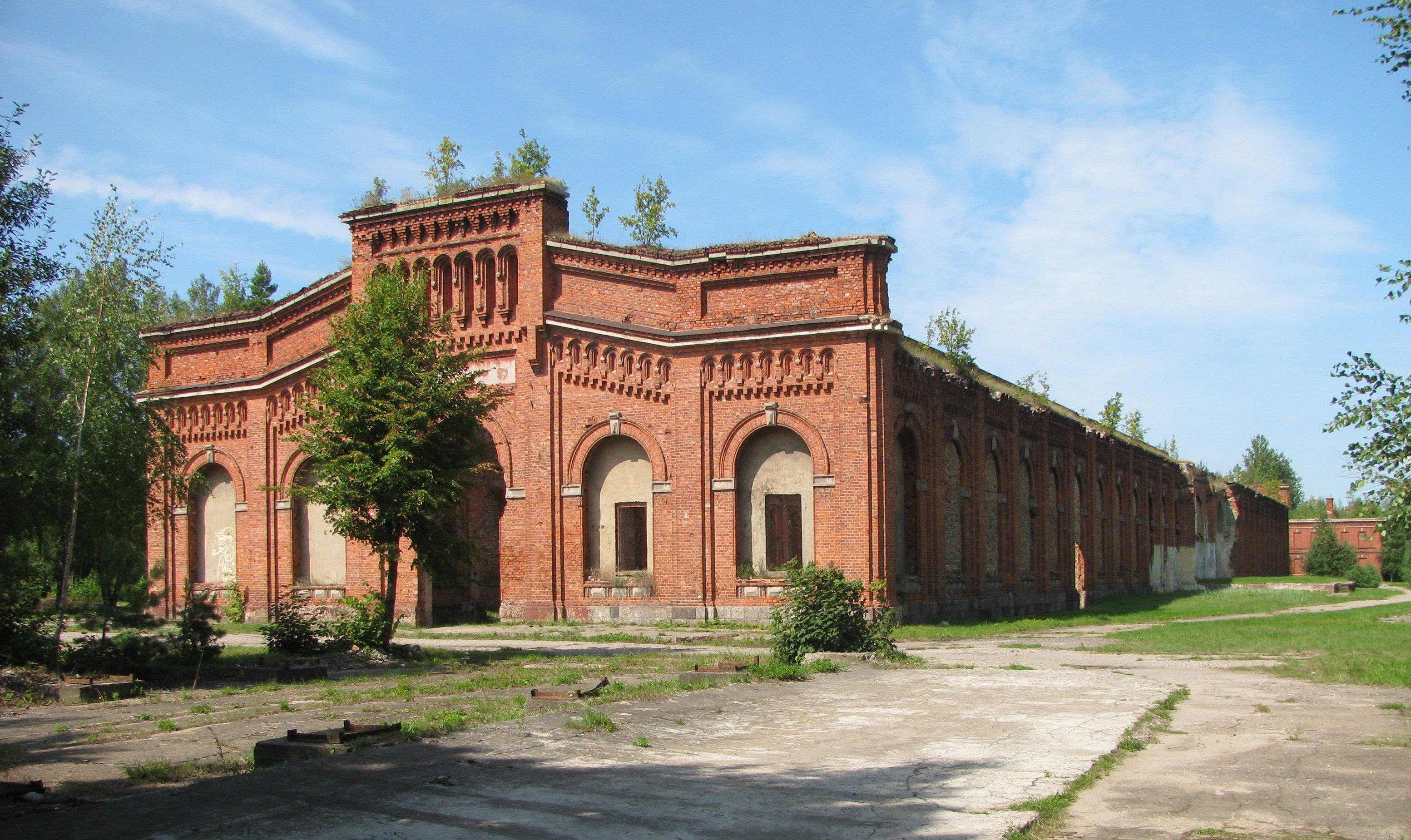
Ruins of the riding arena

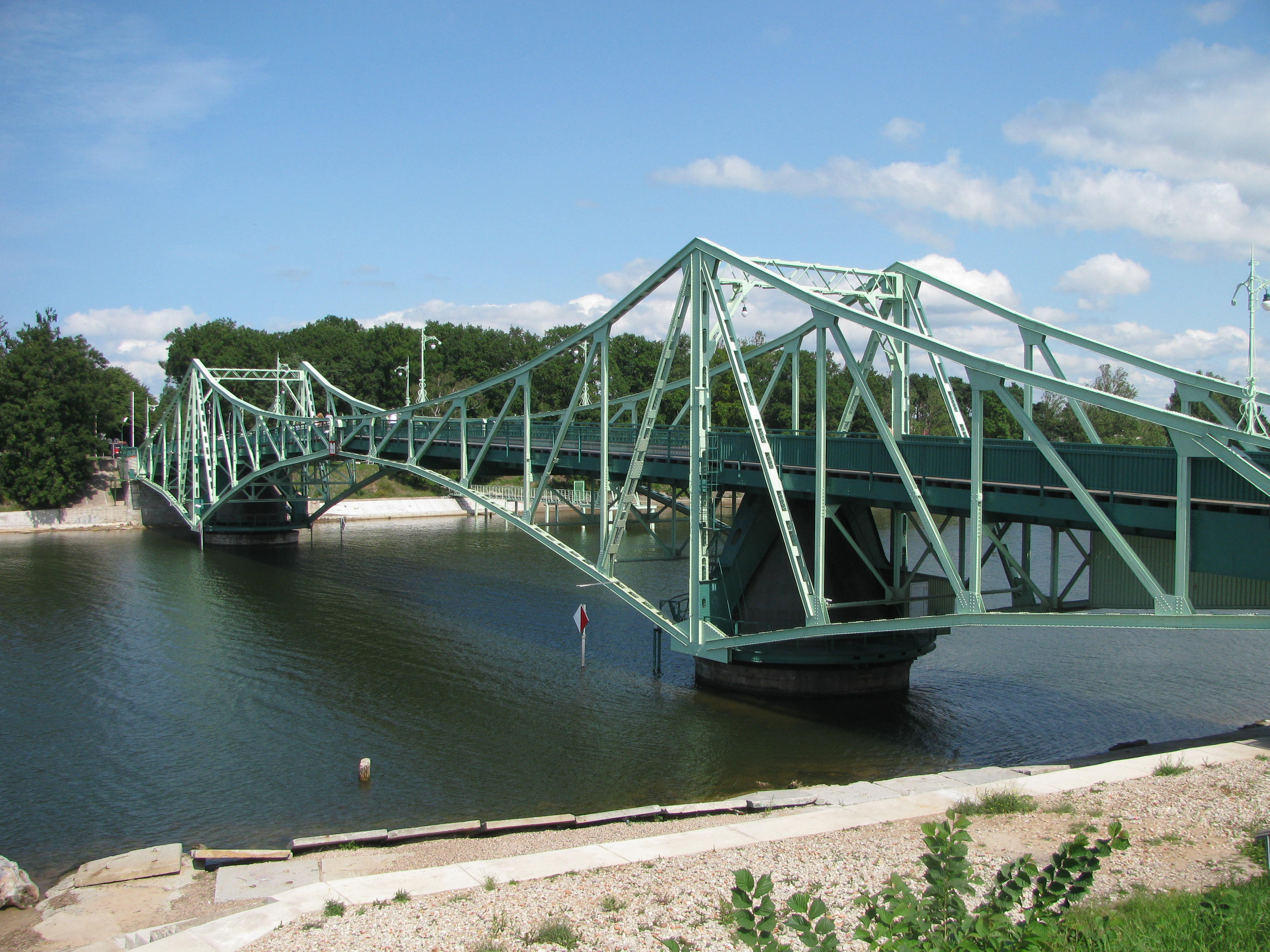
Kalpaka bridge, connects Karosta with other parts of Liepāja

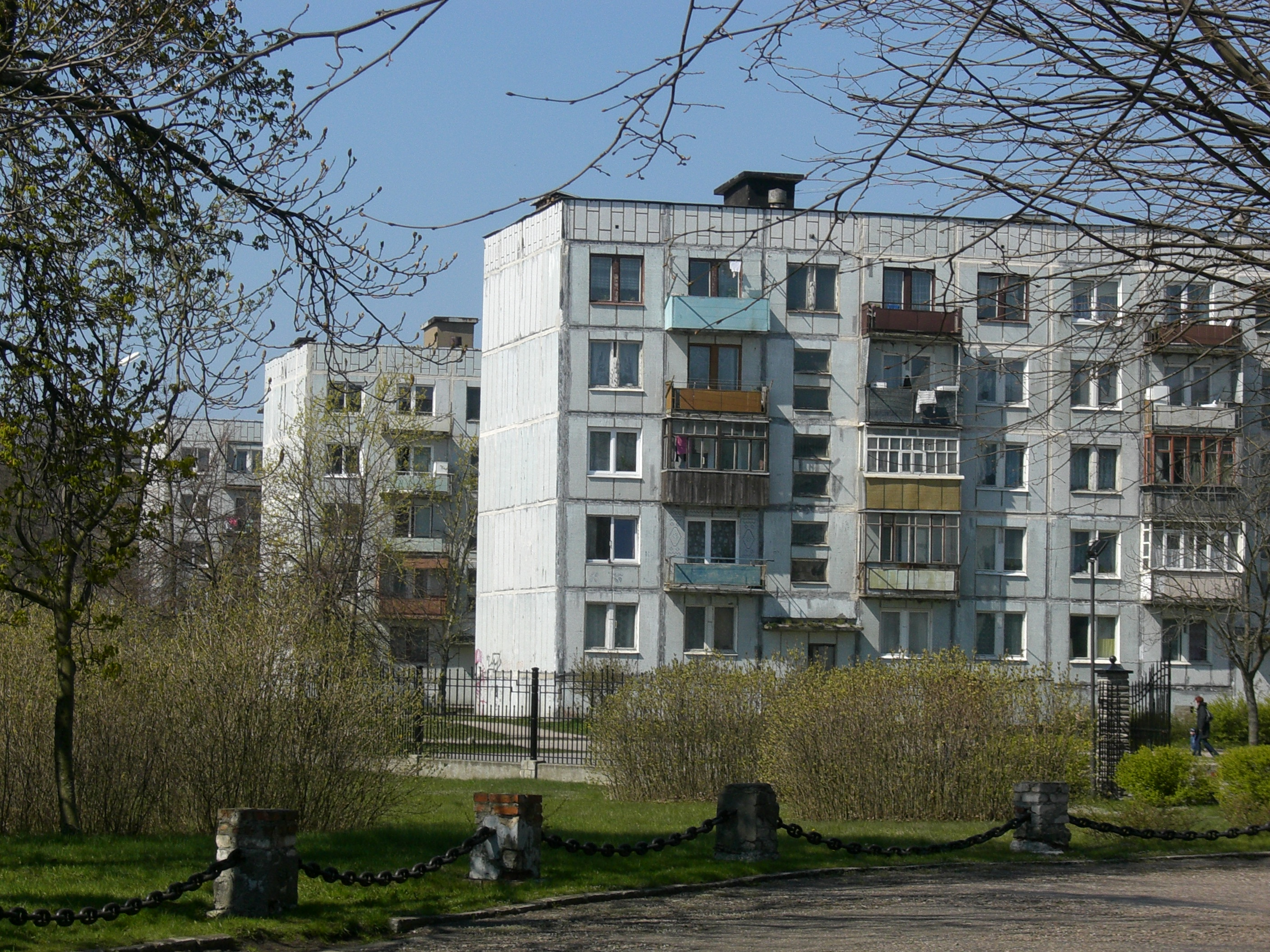
Soviet blockhouses in Karosta

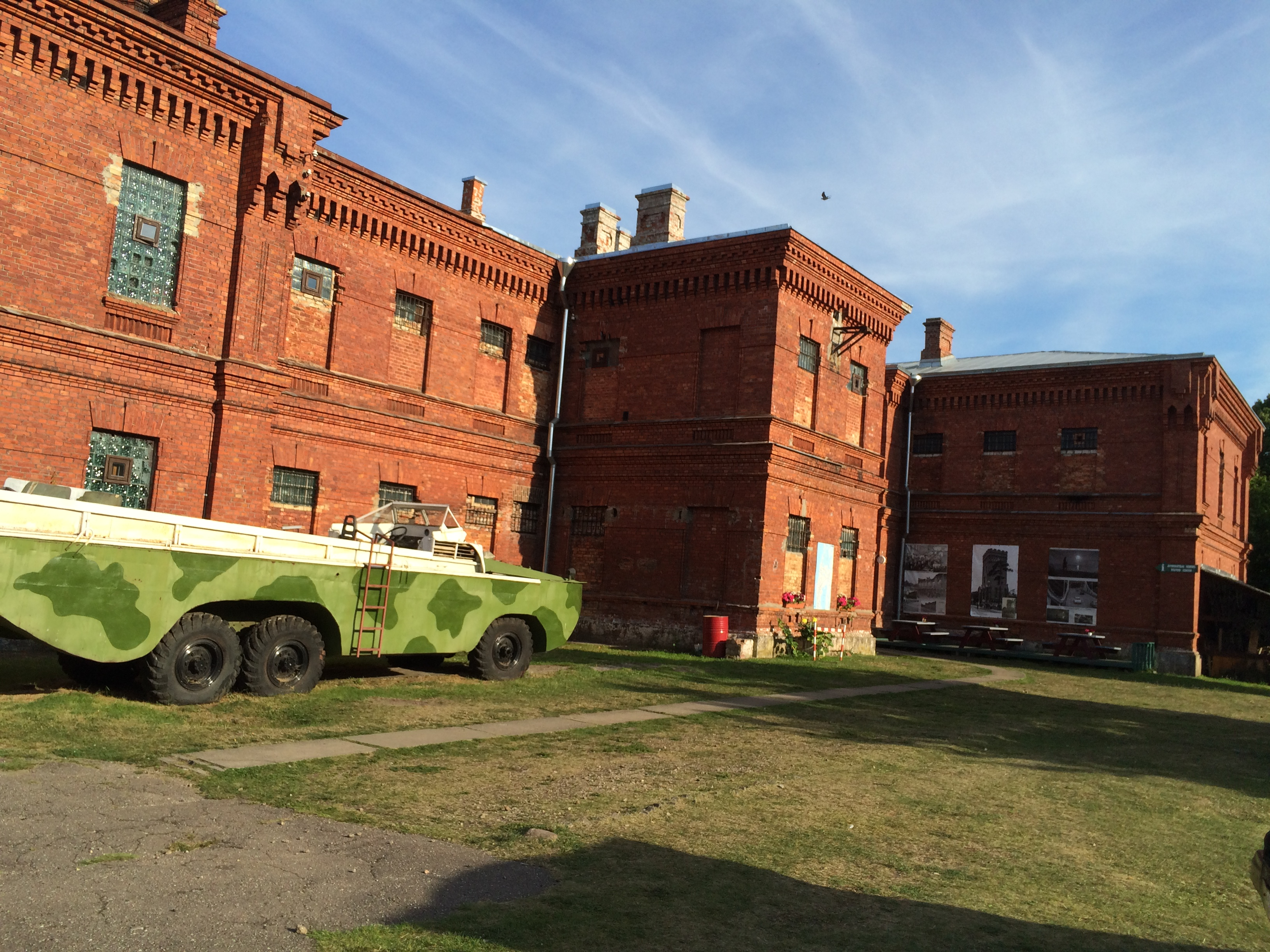
Karosta Prison museum exhibition in 2015.

== In culture ==
In 2008, Ivory Tower Pictures produced a television documentary called Karosta: Life After the USSR directed by Peter King.
