= Kronstadt Naval Cathedral =

Russian Orthodox Church cathedral building in Saint Petersburg, Russia

Naval St. Nicholas Cathedral Морской Никольский Собор Morskoy Nikolskiy Sobor
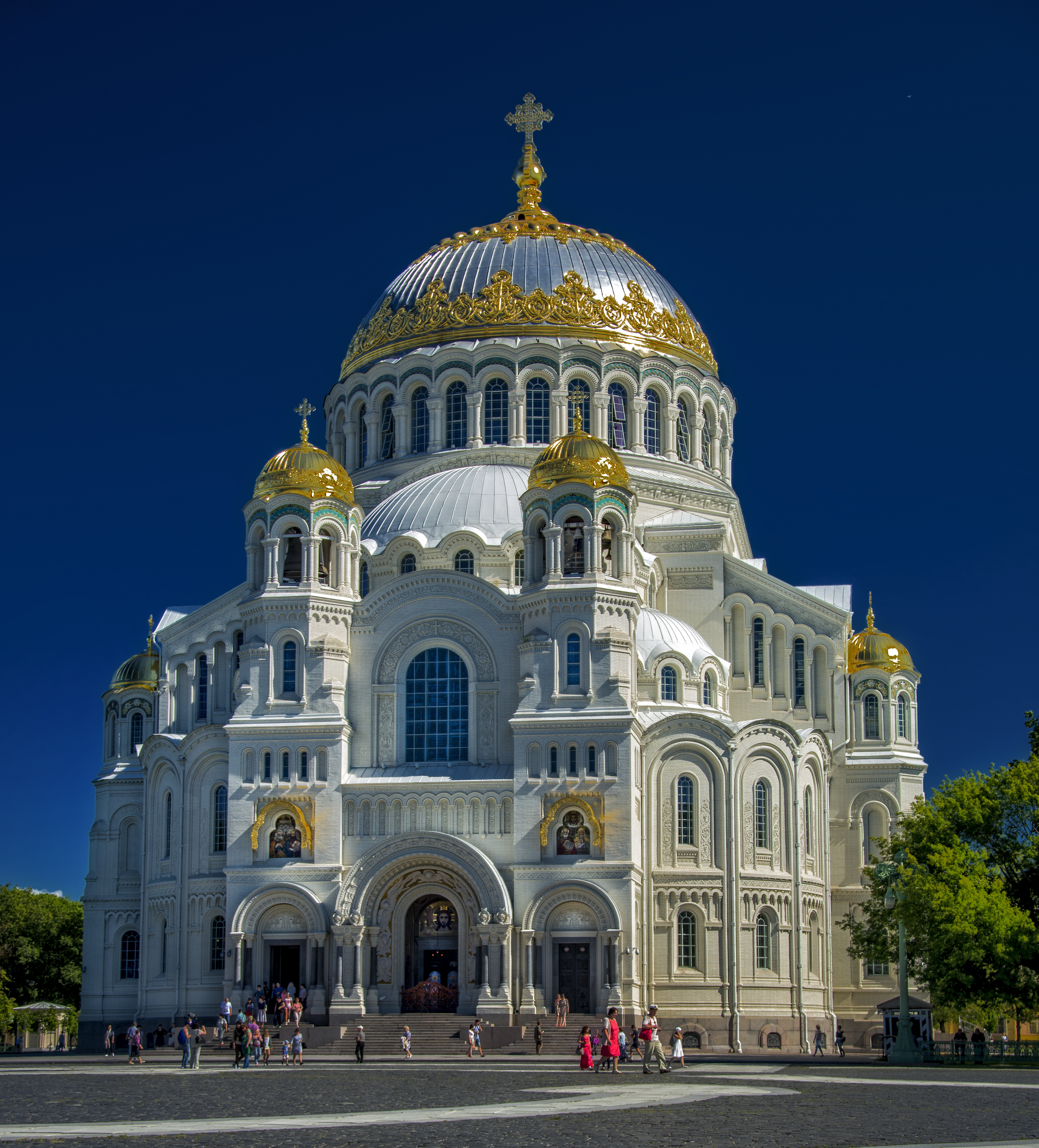
- The Kronstadt Naval Cathedral in August 2015

Religion
- Affiliation: Russian Orthodox

Location
- Location: Yakornaya Square 1, Kronstadt, Saint Petersburg
- Interactive map of Naval St. Nicholas Cathedral; Морской Никольский Собор; Morskoy Nikolskiy Sobor
- Coordinates: 59°59′30″N 29°46′40″E

Architecture
- Architect: Vasily Kosyakov
- Style: Late Neo-Byzantine
- Completed: 10 June 1913

Specifications
- Capacity: 5,000
- Length: 77.3 m (interior); 83.2 m (exterior-stairs)
- Width: 54.4 m (interior); 63.8 m (exterior-stairs)
- Interior area: 3,000 m² (interior); 3,400 m² (exterior-stairs)
- Height (max): 70.6 m (top cross)
- Dome dia. (outer): 29.8 m

Website
- Kronshtadtsobor.ru

The Naval cathedral of Saint Nicholas in Kronstadt (Russian: Морской Никольский собор, Morskoj Nikol'skij sobor) is a Russian Orthodox cathedral built in 1903–1913 as the main church of the Russian Navy and dedicated to all fallen seamen. The cathedral was closed in 1929, was converted to a cinema, a House of Officers (1939) and a museum of the Navy (1980).

The Russian Orthodox Church reinstalled the cross on the main dome in 2002 and (for the first time since 1929) served the Divine Liturgy in the cathedral in 2005. In 2013, the Patriarch of Russia, with Prime Minister Dmitriy Medvedev and his spouse attending, conducted the ceremony of grand reconsecration in the now fully restored cathedral.

== Background ==
The first Orthodox church in Kronstadt was built from 1728 to 1731. The wooden church remained the main place of worship in Russia's largest naval base until 1840, when the counterweights balancing the church bells broke through the rotting floors and seriously damaged the bell tower's structure. Emperor Nicholas I personally ordered the closure of the unsafe church and it was demolished in 1841. For the next half century, worship occurred in temporary locations — in hospitals, barracks and even rented private houses; a temporary wooden church built in 1861 was inadequate for the ten thousand Kronstadt seamen from the start. Numerous Navy requests for construction funding were turned down or simply left unanswered, despite the fact that the cost of a building as large as a contemporary cathedral (200 to 500 thousand roubles) was less than 10% of a pre-dreadnought battleship’s cost (RUB4 to 6 million).

Construction management, extremely centralized until the reign of Alexander II, was gradually decentralized in the 1880s and 1890s. The right to initiate individual construction projects passed from the Emperor himself to imperial ministers and department chiefs. In 1896, admiral Pavel Tyrtov, director of the Imperial Russian Navy Ministry, began preparations to build a cathedral in Kronstadt in earnest. Tyrtov insisted that the cathedral be built on the site identified nearly two centuries earlier by Peter I and reasoned that it should not cost more than the new Kharkov cathedral (200,000 roubles).

== The contests ==
In 1897, the Navy declared an international architectural contest for the design of Kronstadt cathedral and established a fund to finance construction. Typically for Russia, the project was sponsored by the state, intended for the state Navy, but initially financed by personal donations of the Navy servicemen and general public. From 1898 to 1913, all servicemen of the Baltic Fleet were charged 1/400 of their salary to finance the construction; this amounted to 280 thousand roubles, not including truly voluntary donations. Later, as the project unfolded, it became obvious that private donations were insufficient and the state treasury paid for most of the costs.

The contest specified cathedral size in terms of number of worshippers — one thousand men, 16 per square sazhen. This was far smaller than contemporary cathedrals built in provincial towns (Nizhny Novgorod — 2,000 worshippers, Kharkiv — 4,000), more on par with "garrison churches" built in the Caucasus and Congress Poland (Kielce — 900 worshippers). The client was well aware of new construction technologies and welcomed their use as long as it helped to balance the budget. The basement level was reserved only for boilers and fuel storage, saving the costs of establishing a second "winter (i.e. heated) church". The specifications did not prescribe a specific architectural style. Rather, they insisted on cutting costs and prohibited use of such "luxuries" as mosaics or paintings on the inner surface of the dome. These constraints failed the first contest. Only three architects dared to participate, reusing already familiar past drafts; all three were rejected.

The second contest of 1897 also failed; the only draft deemed worthy of execution was too small for the intended purpose. Finally, in 1898, the Navy lifted some of size and cost constraints; this time, the building had to be large enough to be visible from large distance; "the Cross of the cathedral must be the first item visible to incoming ships". Antony Tomishko, author of Kresty prison, won this contest by presenting a Russian Revival draft following Konstantin Thon's Russo-Byzantine tradition.

Nicholas II routinely approved the draft; John of Kronstadt called for immediate start of construction work. However, the newly appointed commander of Kronstadt base admiral Stepan Makarov found Tomishko’s draft too weak artistically and too small for the purpose. He requested the Emperor to reconsider his choice; after nearly two years of delays, Nicholas agreed to discard Tomishko’s draft in June 1900.

== Design ==
Western (main) facade Vasily Kosyakov	Structural cutaway Vasily Kosyakov	Alpha and Omega artwork Georgy Kosyakov	Ritual candelabrum Georgy Kosyakov

Makarov took control of the project and invited Vasily Kosyakov (1862–1921), already a renowned master of Neo-Byzantine architecture. The process of this choice remains undocumented, however, Kosyakov had worked for the Navy before as the architect of church of Our Lady the Merciful in Saint Petersburg. Kosyakov, still in his twenties, had perfected the optimal proportions of a single-dome, four-apse Byzantine design; his 1888–1891 drafts of a church in Astrakhan (itself based on Our Lady the Merciful) were reused all over the Empire. Vasily's younger brother and partner Georgy Kosyakov (1872–1925) was a talented graphic artist; he worked on interiors and finishes while Vasily handled overall and structural design. Makarov personally instructed Kosyakov that the cathedral must accommodate 5,000 worshippers and follow the historical Byzantine canon.

In 1900–01, Vasily Kosyakov travelled to Istanbul and Greece to refresh his understanding of genuine Byzantine art. In April 1901, he presented two preliminary drafts to the Commission of the Navy; the selected draft was approved by Nicholas II 21 May 1901. Kosyakov departed from his preferred proportions of a tall cathedral with a relatively small main dome; instead he opted for a wide (26 meters) but relatively low dome in line with the proportions of Hagia Sophia. The reason for this change remains undocumented. One version attributes it to interference by Makarov. The admiral once was an attache in Istanbul and was well aware of the genuine Byzantine tradition. Another likely version links the change to direct influence of professor Nikolay Sultanov, Kosyakov's teacher at the Institution of Civil Engineers, leader of Russian Revival school. In 1895–1904, Kosyakov was managing the construction of Cathedral of Saints Peter and Paul in Peterhof designed by Sultanov.

By 1903, Kosyakov brothers produced a complete album containing nearly a thousand graphic sheets detailing the structure, exterior and internal design of yet unbuilt cathedral. Physically, the graphics were executed by Georgy Kosyakov. Plan, structure, external outline is credited to Vasily Kosyakov; detailed artwork of interior finishes to Georgy. Interior features were clearly influenced by Art Nouveau, skillfully integrated into a Byzantine shell and complemented with modern engineering systems. Vasily Kosyakov’s layout also demonstrates influence of Romanesque architecture, notably in the twin belltowers by the sides of the main portal — an extremely uncommon feature in Russian practice.

== Construction ==
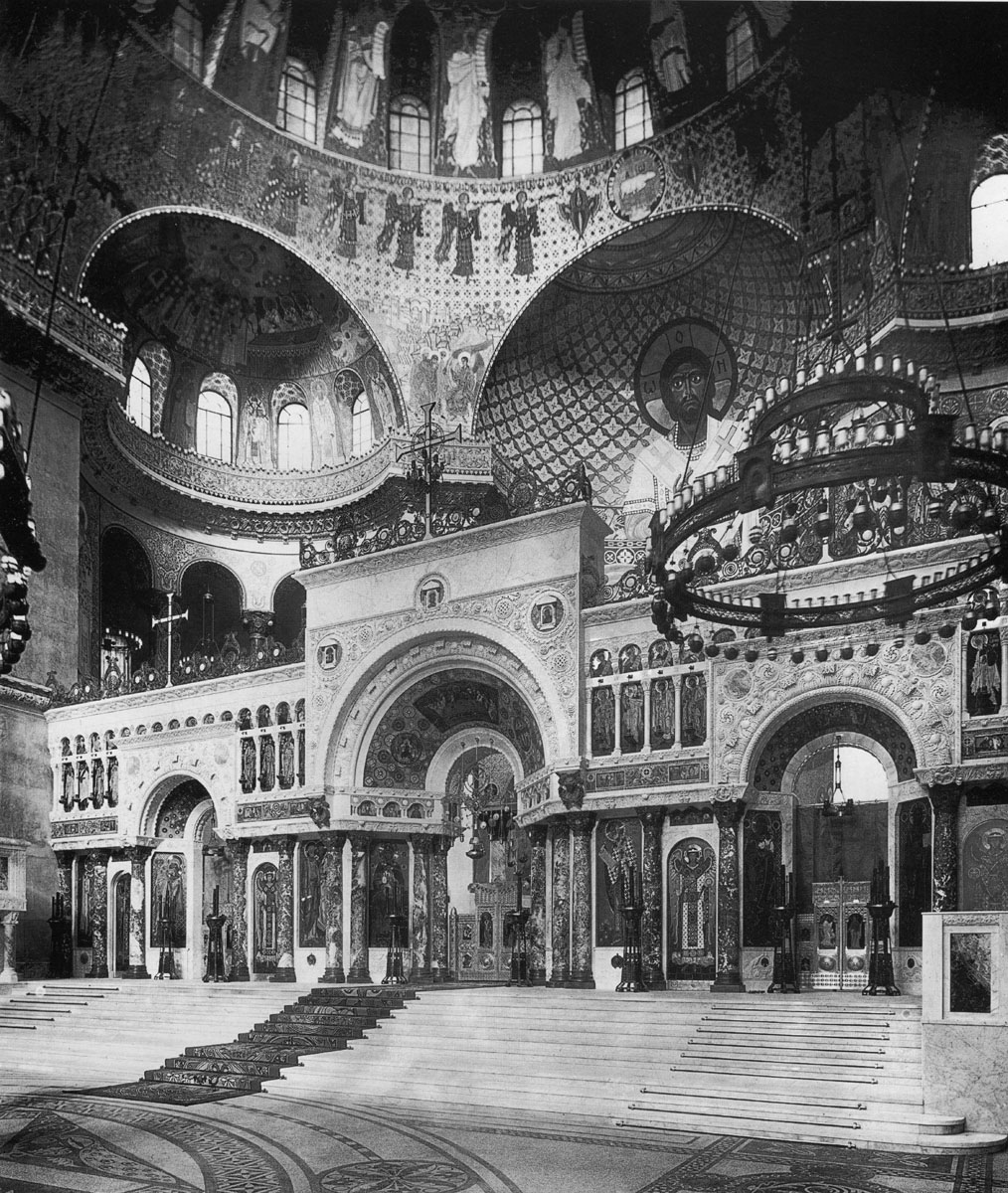
Original interiors in 1914. The altar is raised on a 4 m (13 ft) high platform. Base of the main dome is set at 52 m (171 ft) height.

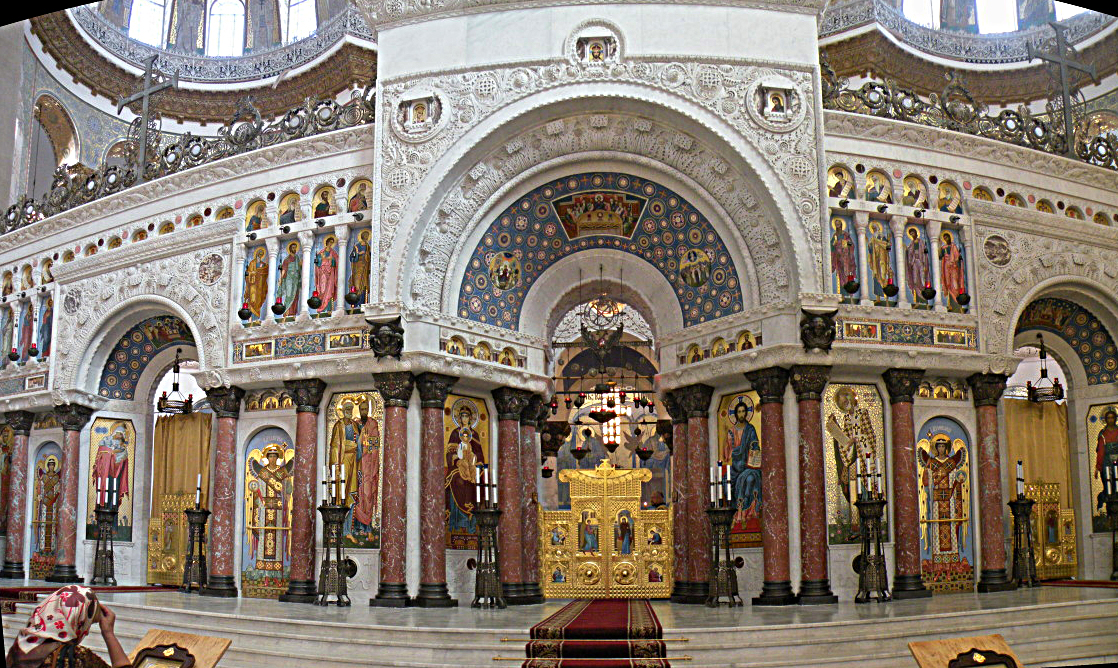
The marble icon screen

On 27 October 1901, the 14,000 strong garrison of Kronstadt was summoned for the groundbreaking on Anchor Square. Earthwork and work on concrete foundations and a granite base continued through 1902; the walls were laid in a massive ceremony 8 May 1903, with the Emperor in attendance.

Despite social unrest that culminated in the Russian Revolution of 1905, the cathedral was structurally complete in 1907; heating and ventilation were operational in 1908, enabling year-round work on the finishes. In 1907, Kosyakov brothers switched to producing detailed drawings and instructions to craftsmen and suppliers of interior finishes. 19 August 1908, they presented the revised album of these drawings to the Romanovs. Nicholas and Alexandra responded with numerous amendments and changes that were implemented by spring of 1909.

In summer of 1909 the external finishes were completed, and the scaffolds removed. The building was clad in black granite (base and columns) and yellow brick (walls) with terra cotta inserts. Inside, the iconostasis was made of marble from the Urals. The four portals were decorated with mosaic images of Theotokos, Saint Nicholas, Peter, Paul, John of Rila and Mitrofan of Voronezh by Foma Raylian. Most interior paintings were executed by the school of Mikhail Vasilyev; icons were painted by Appolon Troitsky. Adjacent park was designed by E. G. Gilbikh.

The cathedral was equipped with an independent central heating and a central vacuum cleaning system employing a complex network of pressurized manifolds and valves. Electrical lighting employed 5 thousand light bulbs.

The cathedral was consecrated in a public ceremony attended by Nicholas II and his family 10 June 1913. Total cost reached an unprecedented amount of 1,955,000 roubles, not including donations in kind and unpaid labor by the seamen and civilians.

== Operation ==
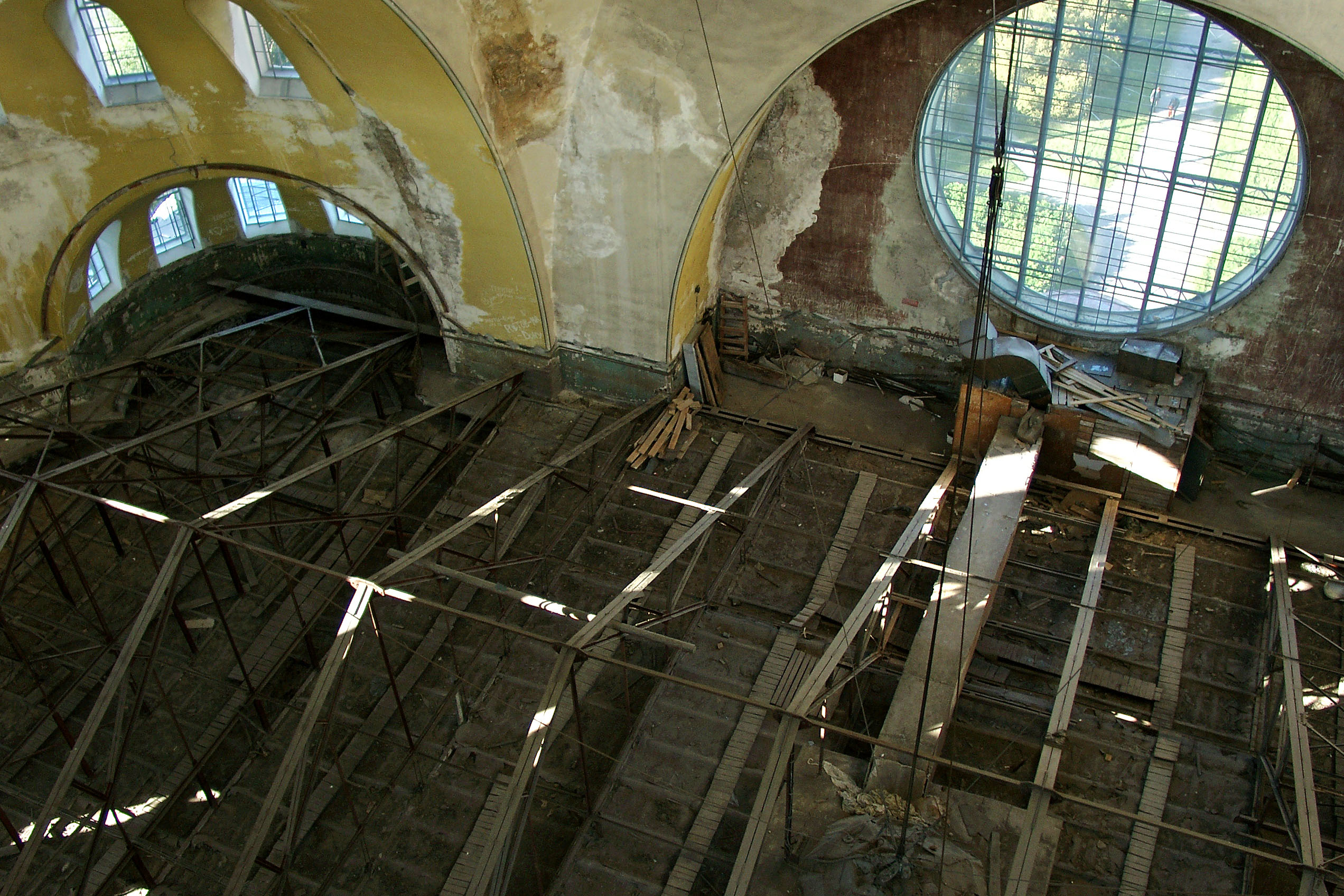
Suspended ceiling, built in 1956 (photo before renovation)

The cathedral operated as such for only 16 years. It was closed 14 October 1929 by the communist regime and its valuables were nationalized to the state treasury. A small portion of these relics were displayed at the Museum of Navy and the Russian Museum.

In 1930 and 1931, the communist authorities had the cathedral defaced; its crosses and bells toppled over and hauled to the foundries. One bell, weighing 4,726 kilograms (second largest) remained in place — either due to technical difficulties or deliberately, as an emergency alarm signal. Internal marble items, including the iconostasis and the memorial boards with names of the fallen seamen, were ripped out, broken, or cut and reused for ordinary construction needs. A small number of memorial boards ended up in the Museum of Navy and were "written off" in 1970.

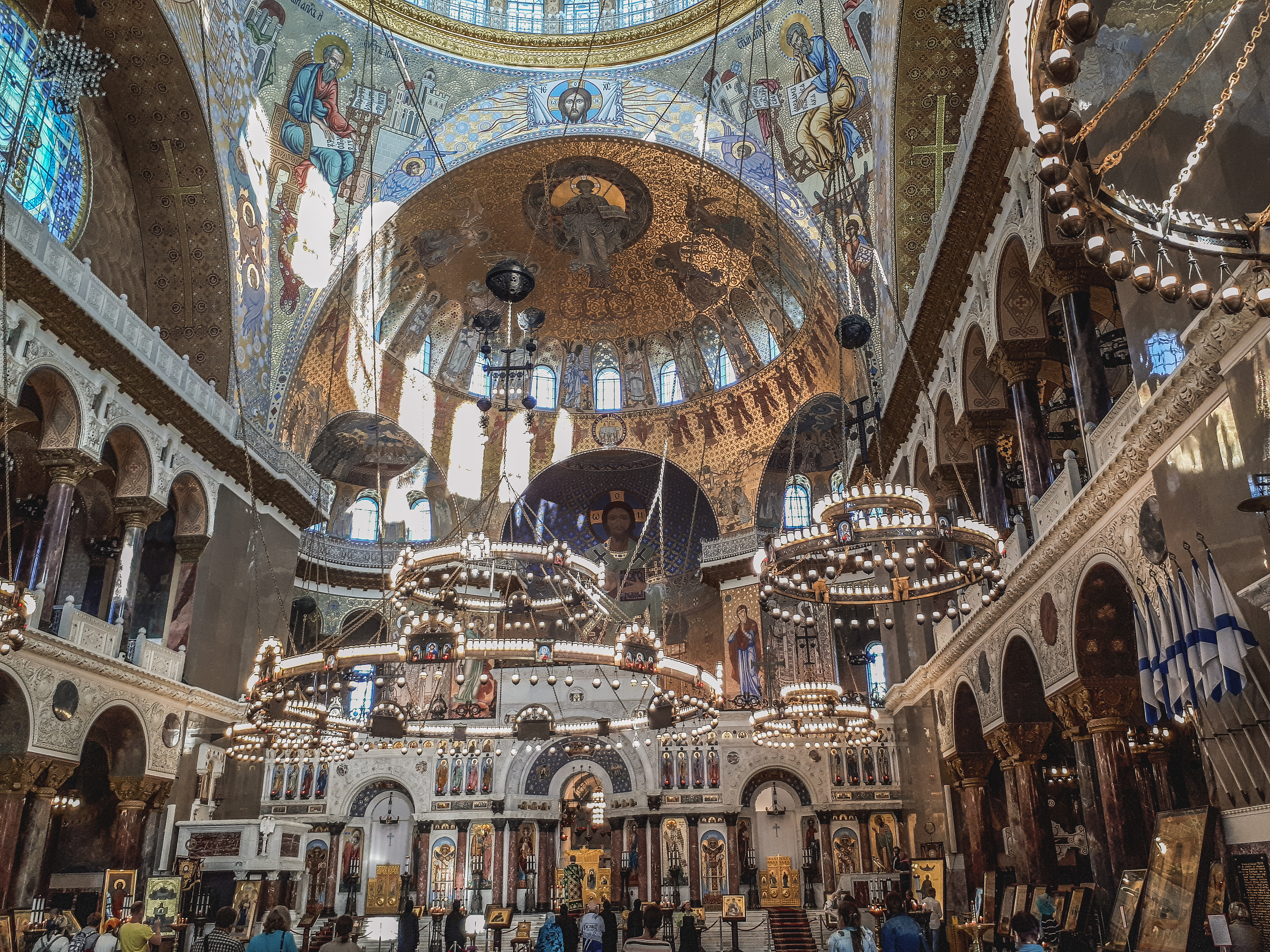
Restored interior

In 1932, the cathedral nave was converted to a cinema, frivolously named New Star (in English, transliterated in Cyrillic) but soon renamed to more appropriate Maxim Gorky; in 1939 the cinema was upgraded to a House of the Officers (akin to a community center) of Kronshtadt garrison. During World War II it closed; the dome received three direct artillery hits. Post-war "reconstruction" in 1953 and 1954 finally converted the cathedral to a functioning concert hall. This time, the builders added a suspended ceiling that isolated the nave from the dome; it remained in place as of the end of 2007. Reduction of military personnel in the 1960s made the concert hall redundant; in 1980 the cathedral reopened as a branch of the Central Museum of Navy.

The Russian Orthodox Church attempted to repossess the cathedral in the 1990s. The first cross to be reinstalled on the main dome was made in 1996 but was not erected due to financial problems. The second attempt, in 2002, employed a heavy helicopter and nearly ended in a disaster: the seven-meter cross fell from the dome and was damaged beyond repair; there were no human injuries. The third cross was successfully erected on 24 November 2002. Three years later, on 2 November 2005, the church celebrated the first Divine Liturgy in the Naval Cathedral since 1929. In September 2008, the cathedral became operational again, but services were only conducted on special occasions.

The cathedral then underwent extensive repairs, restoration, and improvements, and was reconsecrated on 30 May 2013 by Patriarch Cyril in time for the cathedral's centennial anniversary.

In 2023, Ukrainian intelligence services alleged that the cathedral now functions as the headquarters of a private military company, funded by and closely linked to the Russian Orthodox Church.

== See also ==
- List of largest Eastern Orthodox church buildings
- List of tallest domes
- Main Cathedral of the Russian Armed Forces
