= Alexander Nevsky Cathedral, Tver =

Coordinates: 56°50′12″N 35°53′36″E

Alexander Nevsky
- Собор Александра Невского
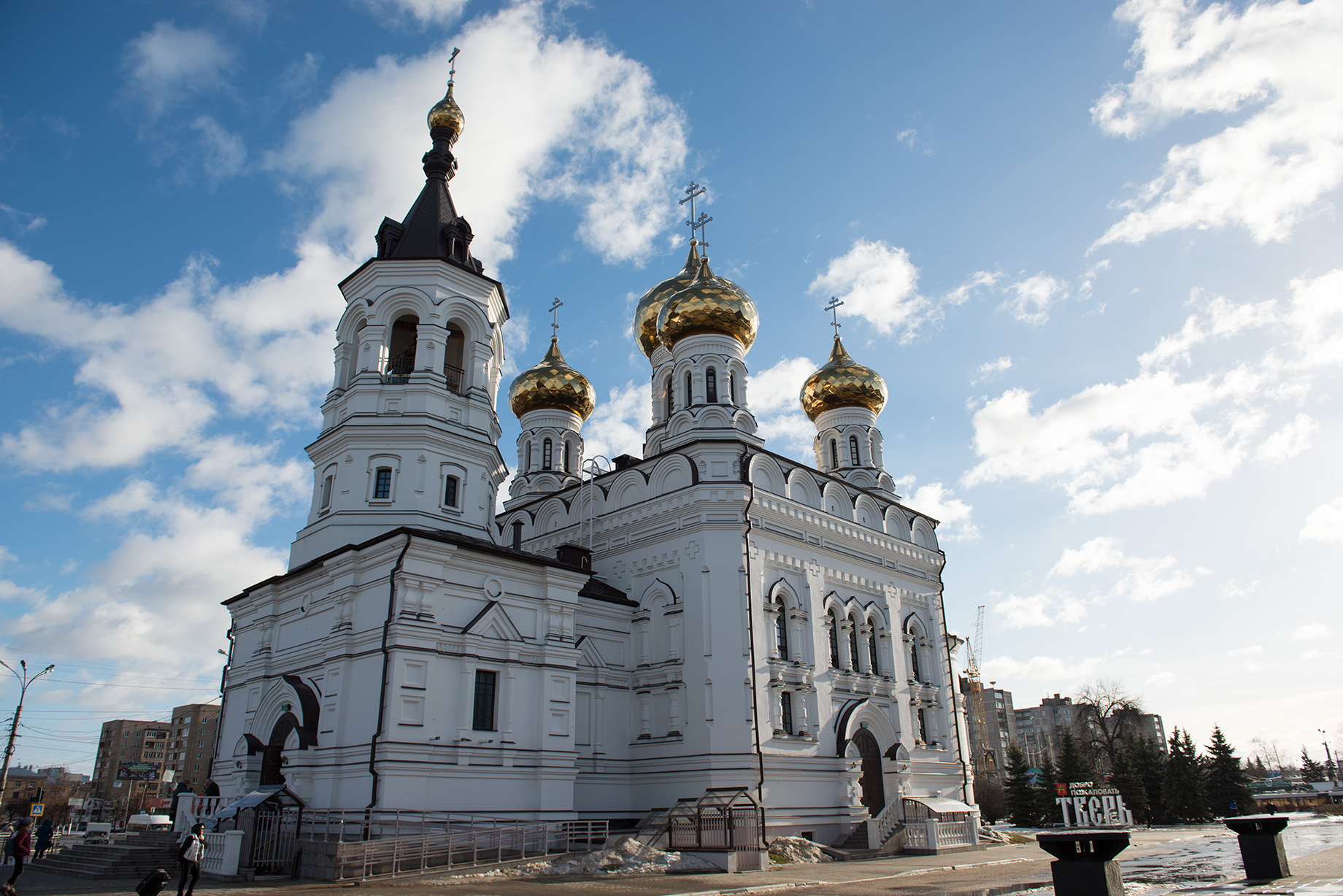
- Alexander Nevsky
- Location: Tver
- Country: Russia
- Denomination: Russian Orthodox

Architecture
- Architect: Vladimir Mikryukov
- Style: Russian architecture
- Groundbreaking: 2010
- Completed: 2015

The Alexander Nevsky Cathedral (Russian: Собор Александра Невского) is a Russian Orthodox cathedral in the Diocese of Tver, located on Station Square in the intersection of Tchaikovsky Prospekt and Komintern Prospekt in Tver, Russia. Built between 2010 and 2015, it stands on the site of the former Church of Alexander Nevsky, built between 1891 and 1893, closed in 1929, and demolished in 1982.

== History ==
Work began on the building of the church in 1891. Civil engineer F. N. Malinovsky undertook the project and started construction, which lasted until 1893. The new church was consecrated in the name of the Holy Prince Alexander Nevsky, the patron saint of the reigning emperor, Alexander III of Russia. Its architectural design was typical for the period, which reflected traditional 17th century Russian architectural styles. The view of the station completes the main road.

In 1929 the church was closed, and the building was redeveloped several times for a variety of uses, and it lost its bell tower, five domes, and wall decorations. Finally, in 1982, its disfigured skeleton was destroyed as part of the reconstruction of Tver railway station. In 1999 a cross was erected on the site of the cathedral.

== Reconstruction ==
Following the dissolution of the Soviet Union, it was decided to rebuild the cathedral. In 2009, the Initiative Group (Board of Trustees) was formed, which included businessmen and distinguished men of the city. During the ceremony of laying the foundation stone, the relics of Thaddeus of Tver, Archbishop of Tver were interred in the cathedral.

The work was fully completed in 2015 and the Cathedral held its first service on Easter Sunday, 12 April 2015.
