= Diocese of Chersonesus =

Diocese of Chersonesus may refer to:

- Roman Catholic Diocese of Chersonesus (disambiguation)
- Russian Orthodox Diocese of Chersonesus
