= David Grimm (architect) =

Russian architect (1823–1898)

- Давид Гримм
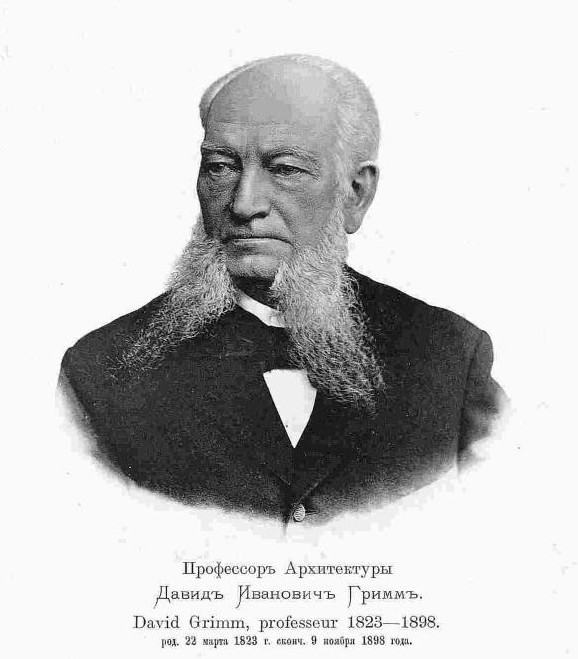
- Born: 3 April [O.S. 22 March] 1823; Saint Petersburg, Russia
- Died: 21 November [O.S. 9 November] 1898 (aged 75); Saint Petersburg, Russia
- Education: Member Academy of Arts (1855); Professor by rank (1860)
- Known for: Architecture
- Notable work: Chersonesus Cathedral
- Awards: Big Gold Medal of the Imperial Academy of Arts (1848)

David Ivanovich Grimm (Russian: Дави́д Ива́нович Гримм; 3 April [O.S. 22 March] 1823 – 21 November [O.S. 9 November] 1898) was a Russian architect, educator and historian of art specialising in the Byzantine Empire, Georgia and Armenia. Grimm belonged to the second generation of Russian neo-Byzantine architects and was the author of Orthodox cathedrals in Tbilisi, Chersonesos and smaller churches in Russia and Western Europe. Grimm was a long-term professor at the Imperial Academy of Arts and chaired its department of architecture in 1887–1892.

== Biography ==
David Grimm was born in a Lutheran German family and attended the German Saint Peter's School in Saint Petersburg. He completed the class of Alexander Brullov at the Imperial Academy of Arts in 1841–1848. His graduation honours entitled Grimm to take an Academy-sponsored study tour of Italy and France, but it was cancelled due to the revolutions of 1848 in Europe. Rather than waiting until the end of hostilities, Grimm opted for a study tour of the Caucasus (1849–1850) that exposed him to the wealth of vernacular Georgian and Armenian architecture. In 1852–1855 Grimm travelled to Asia Minor, Italy and Greece, studying the Byzantine relics. These studies were summarized in Grimm's 12-volume Monuments of Byzantine architecture in Georgia and Armenia (1859–1856) and subsequent works. Grimm became a professor of the Institute of Civil Engineers in 1856 and at the Academy in 1859.

In 1858 empress Maria Alexandrovna commissioned Grimm to design the cathedral in Chersonesos, on the site of a Greek church where Vladimir I of Kiev was baptized in 988. Construction of the cathedral commenced before the Crimean War to the design by Konstantin Thon; after the war, his design was discarded and work began from scratch. Maria's choice was influenced by another Byzantine scholar, Grigory Gagarin. Grimm's design was approved in June 1859 and displayed to the public the next year. Unlike contemporary Byzantine architects, Grimm based his draft on Georgian legacy, employing polygonal surfaces instead of Byzantine cylinders and domes. Construction started in 1861 and, despite royal sponsorship, proceeded very slowly: the structure was completed in 1876, and the interiors in 1897. The Chersonesus Cathedral remained a sole example of the Georgian line in Byzantine revival until it reappeared shortly before World War I.

The other commission of the Romanovs, a Byzantine chapel in Nice, commemorating the late Nicholas Alexandrovich, was completed in less than two years, 1866–1868). In the next twenty years Grimm designed numerous Orthodox "embassy churches", including the Russian Church, Geneva, the Alexander Nevsky Church, Copenhagen and the Church of Mary Magdalene in Jerusalem; according to the state preference, they were executed in the Russian Revival theme of 17th century Yaroslavl architecture.

In 1865 Grimm and Robert Gedike jointly took part in the contest to design a new cathedral in Tbilisi but lost to Victor Schroeter and Alexander Huhn. Schroeter-Huhn proposal, if executed, would have been the largest Neo-Byzantine structure of its time. The client – viceroy of the Caucasus Mikhail Nikolayevich – dismissed the Schroeter-Huhn proposal as too expensive; he supported the Grimm-Gedike draft but instructed the architects to decrease its size to cut costs. The building that was completed in 1871–1897 followed the original Russian scheme of a single dome with four symmetrical apses created by Roman Kuzmin in 1861, yet Grimm changed his proportions to create a tall, vertical silhouette. Grimm's draft, publicised in the 1860s, paved the road to numerous variations of the same single-dome layout and was perfected by Vasily Kosyakov in the 1880s.

Grimm's last design, the burial vault of Grand Dukes in Peter and Paul Fortress, remained on paper: after Grimm's death, the project was taken over by Antony Tomischko, who also died soon, and the Vault was redesigned and completed by Leon Benois in Baroque style.

David Grimm was buried at Smolenskoe Lutheran Cemetery in Saint Petersburg. His son, German Grimm (1865–1942), was also a successful architect; his grandson, German Germanovich Grimm (1904–1959), was an educator and historian of art.

== Buildings ==
- Cathedral of Saint Vladimir in Chersonesos (draft 1858–1859, completed 1897)
- Grand Ducal Burial Vault at the Peter and Paul Cathedral
- Church of Saint Olga in the grand ducal manor of Mikhailovka, Strelna (1861–1863)
- Completion of German Reformist church in Saint Petersburg (draft 1862 by Harald Julius von Bosse, completed 1865)
- Chapel to the memory of late Nicholas Alexandrovich, Nice (draft 1866, completed 1868)
- Cathedral of Saint Alexander Nevsky, Tbilisi (draft 1865–1870, completed 1897)
- Moika Embankment, 42 (Saint Petersburg), 1867–1870
- Church of Protection in Gatchina, completed 1883
- Church of Saint Alexander Nevsky, Copenhagen (completed 1883 by Albert Nielsen)
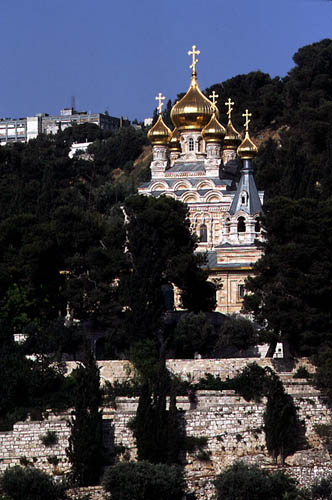
Church of Maria Magdalene

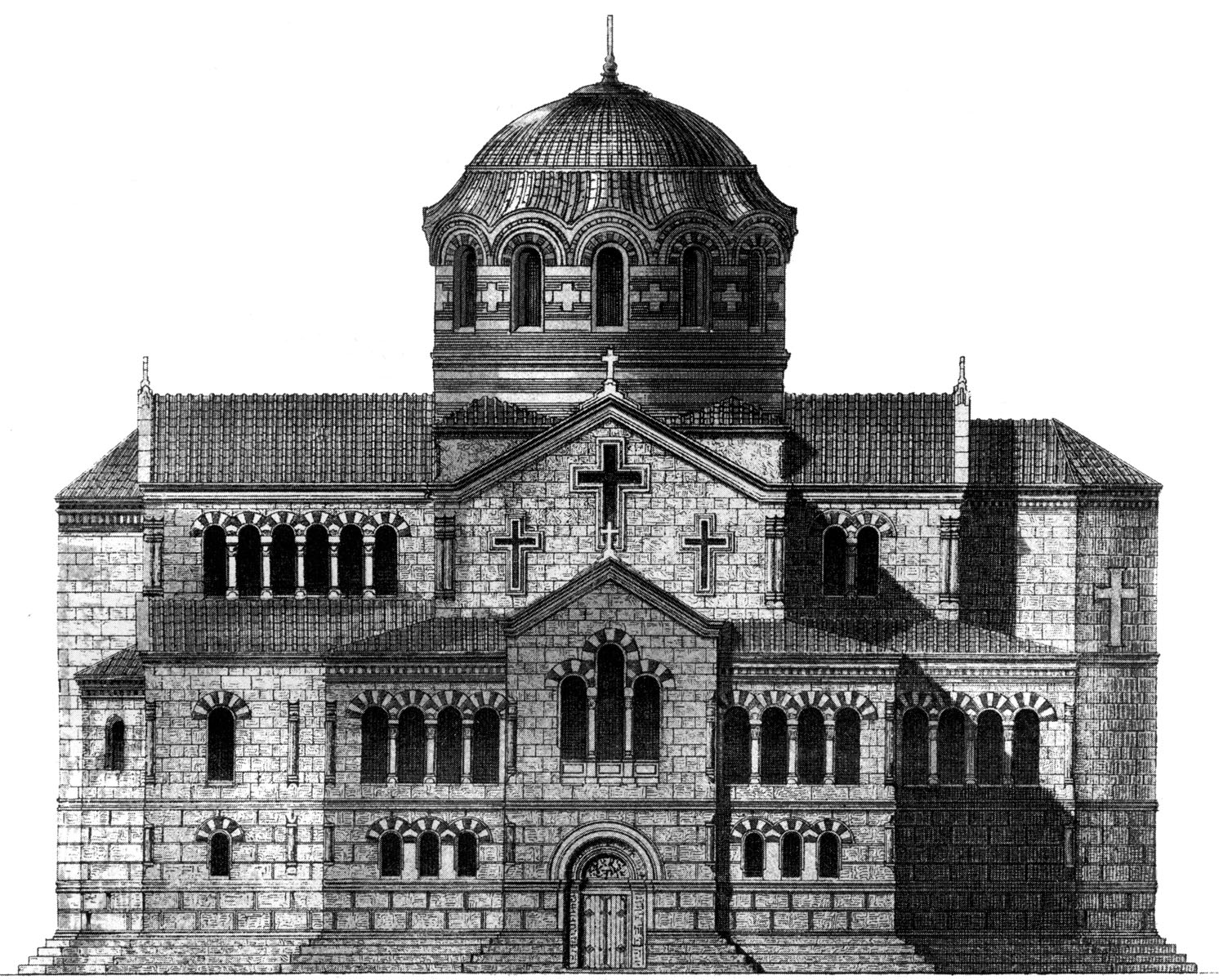
Chersonesos Cathedral, draft

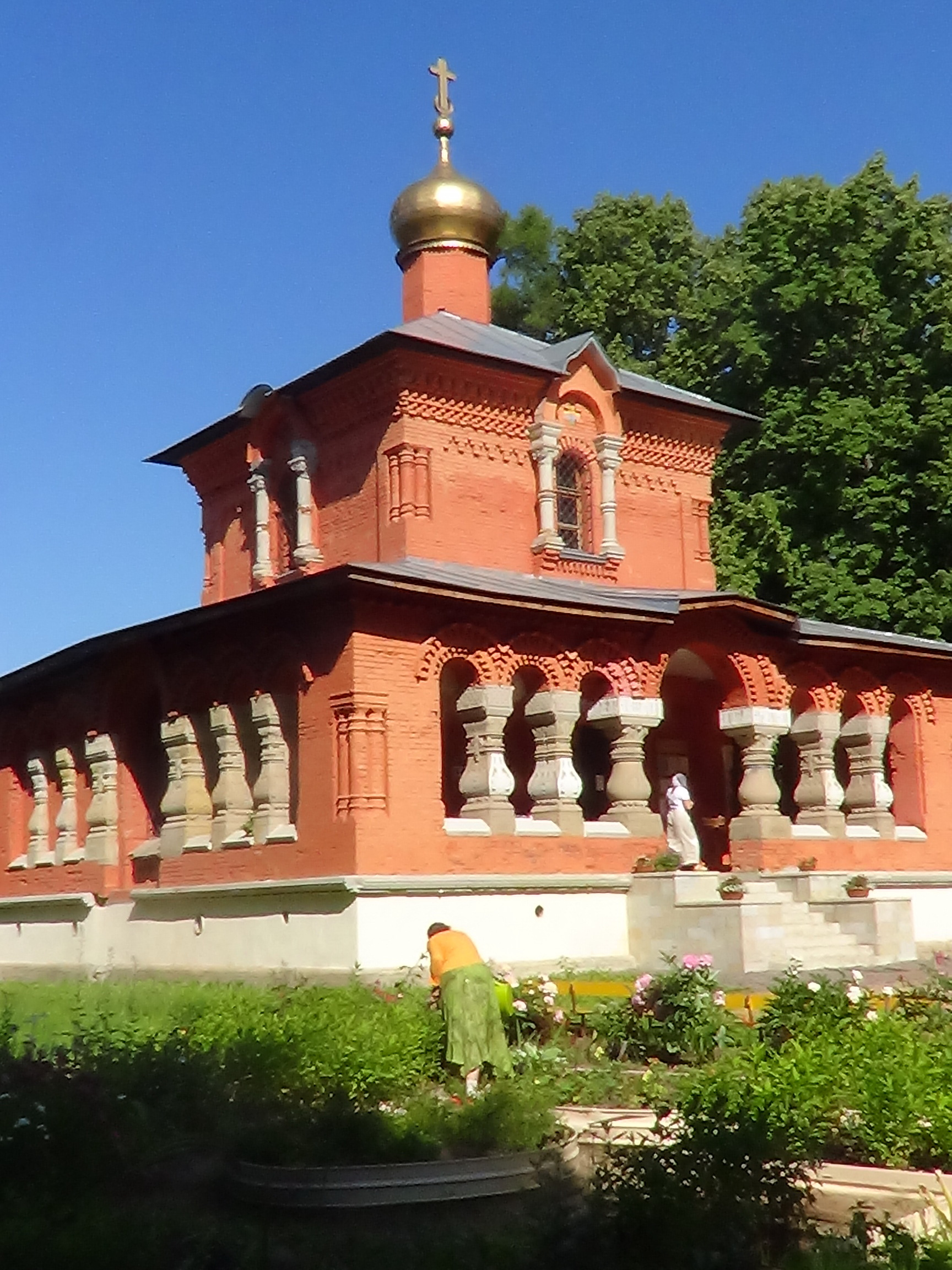
Mikhailovka Church, 1863

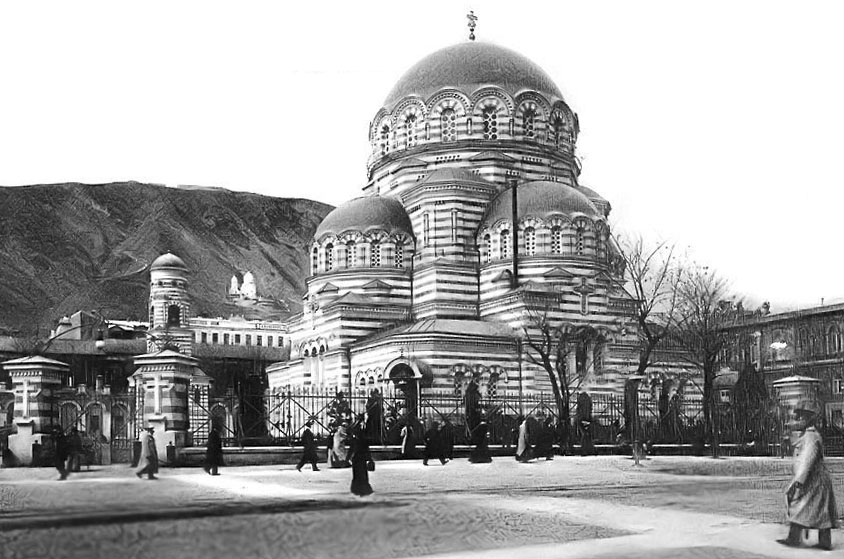
Tbilisi cathedral, 1897

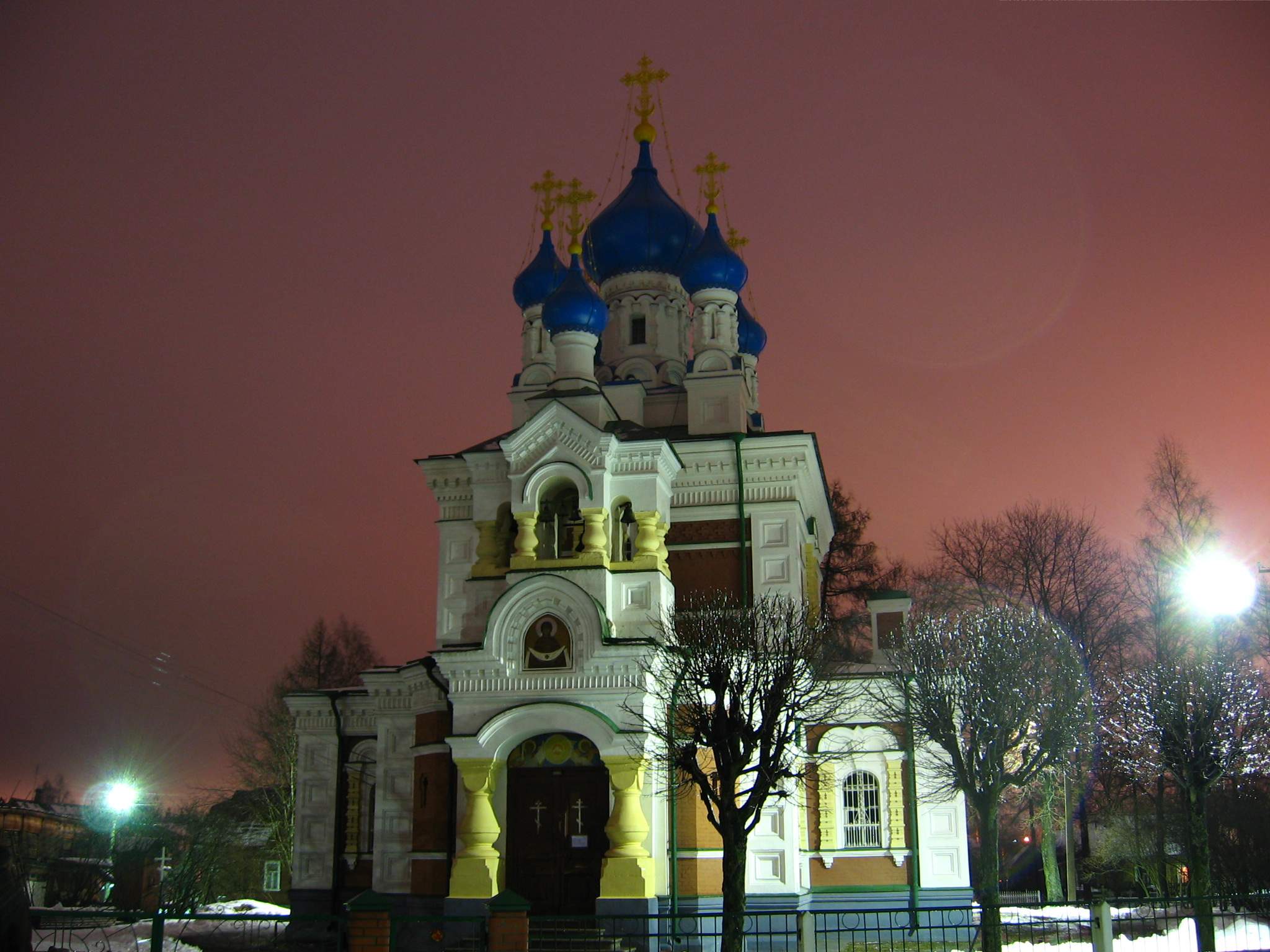
Protection church in Gatchina, present day
