= Bell of Chersonesos =

Landmark in Crimea

Coordinates: 44.6131°N 33.4920°E

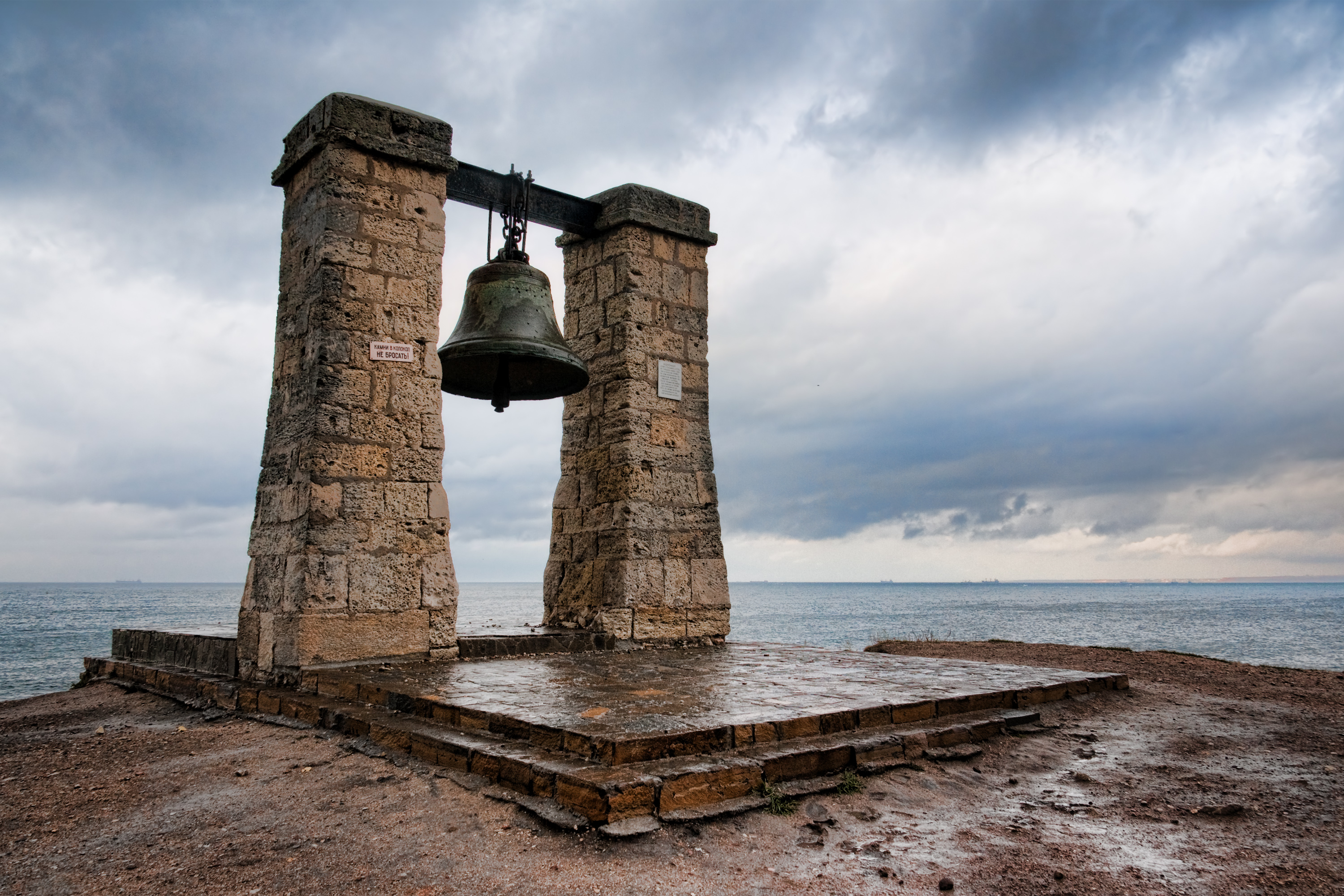
The bell of Chersonesos overlooking the Black Sea.

The Bell of Chersonesos, located close to the ruins of Chersonesos Taurica, Crimea, is the symbol of Chersonesos and one of the main sights of Sevastopol. It was cast before the foundation of Sevastopol for the Saint Nicholas the Wonderworker Church in Taganrog, which was the Russian Navy's military base at that time. It was later seized as war booty by the French, then returned.

== History ==
The bell of Chersonesos or the fog bell of Chersonesos is sometimes considered as "one of Taganrog's sights located abroad", which even became a symbol of another city – of Sevastopol or, to be more exact, of Chersonesos Taurica.

Today's fog bell was cast in 1778 from the Turkish trophy cannons seized by the Russian Imperial Army during the Russo-Turkish War of 1768–1774. The bell features depictions of two patron saints of sailors, Saint Nicholas and Saint Phocas, and the following phrase on it can still be read today in Russian: «Сей колокол вылит в Святого Николая Чудотворца в Таганро… из пленен Турецкой артиллери […] весом […] пуд фу (нт) 1778 месяца Августа […] числа»., which translates as: "This bell was cast in the Saint Nicholas the Wonderworker Church in Taganrog from the trophy Turkish artillery […] weight […] pounds. Year 1778, month of August, on the day of […]".

The bell was cast before the foundation of Sevastopol for the Saint Nicholas the Wonderworker Church in Taganrog, which was the Russian Navy's military base at that time. Until 1803 the St. Nicholas church was subordinated to the Navy ministry. After Sevastopol became the main Russian military navy base in the South of Russia, the Emperor Alexander I ordered the bell to be transported to Sevastopol to be fitted in the Church of St. Nicholas which was being constructed there, with other bells and church plates also given over to the city of Sevastopol.

During the Crimean War the fog bell was seized by the French and was placed in the cathedral of Notre-Dame of Paris. Decades later, a bell with a Russian inscription was found and finally, thanks to diplomatic efforts undertaken by both sides, and especially by the French consul in Sevastopol Louis Ge, the bell was solemnly returned on September 13, 1913, to a monastery at Chersonesos and was placed on a temporary wooden belfry near the St. Vladimir Cathedral. The French president Raymond Poincaré in his letter to consul Louis Ge wrote that he returned the bell to Russia "as a sign of alliance and friendship". In their turn, the Russian government awarded the French consul the Order of St. Vladimir of the 4th degree.

The monastery was closed in 1925 by the Soviet Russian authorities, and two years later all its bells were sent away to be recast. Only one bell escaped this fate because the Department of the Security of Navigation of the Black and Azov Seas proposed to place it on the coast as a signal fog bell. In this capacity the bell served until the 1960s.

== Gallery ==
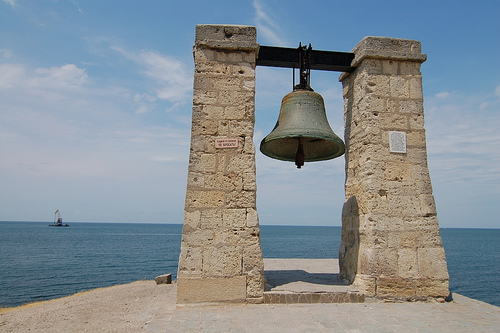
The bell of Chersonesos, view on the Black Sea

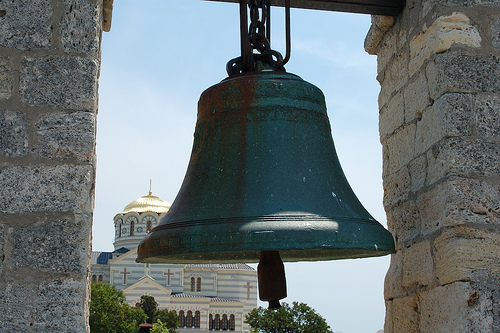
The bell of Chersonesos, view on the St. Vladimir Cathedral

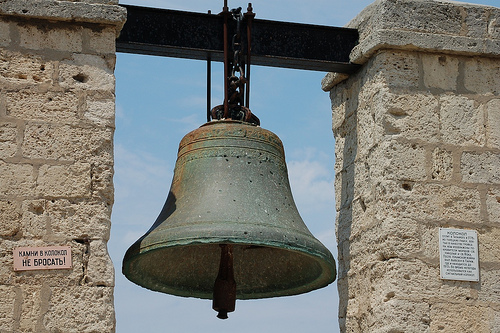
The bell of Chersonesos, close-up

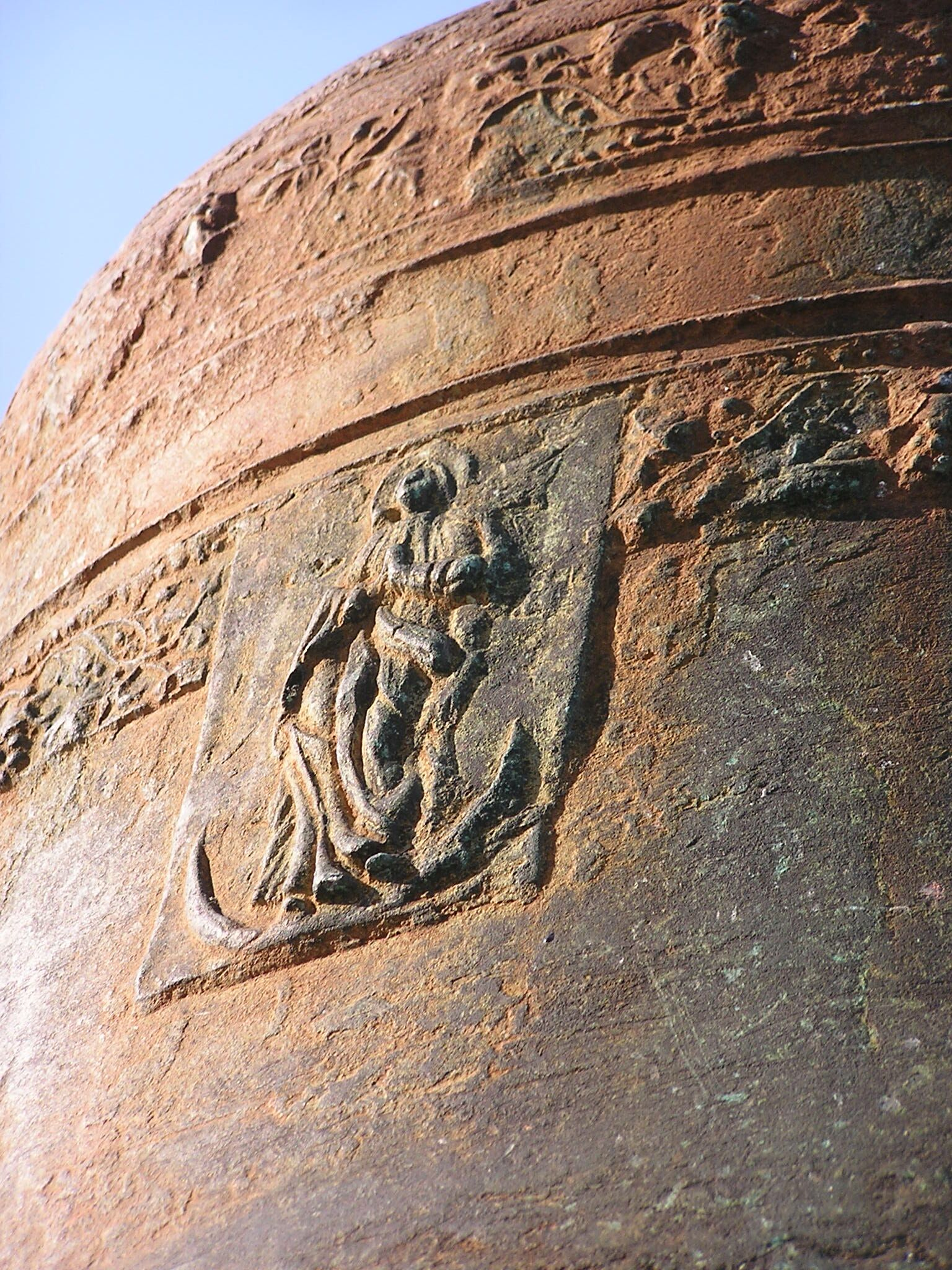
Close-up

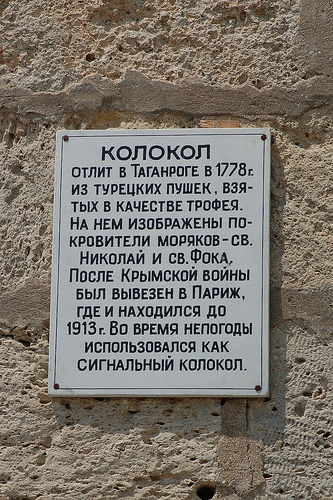
Memorial plaque with short history of the fog bell

== In film ==
The bell of Chersonesos was featured in the 1975 Soviet Russian film for children Priklyucheniya Buratino (The Adventures of Buratino).
