= The Bell Buoy =

1896 poem by Rudyard Kipling

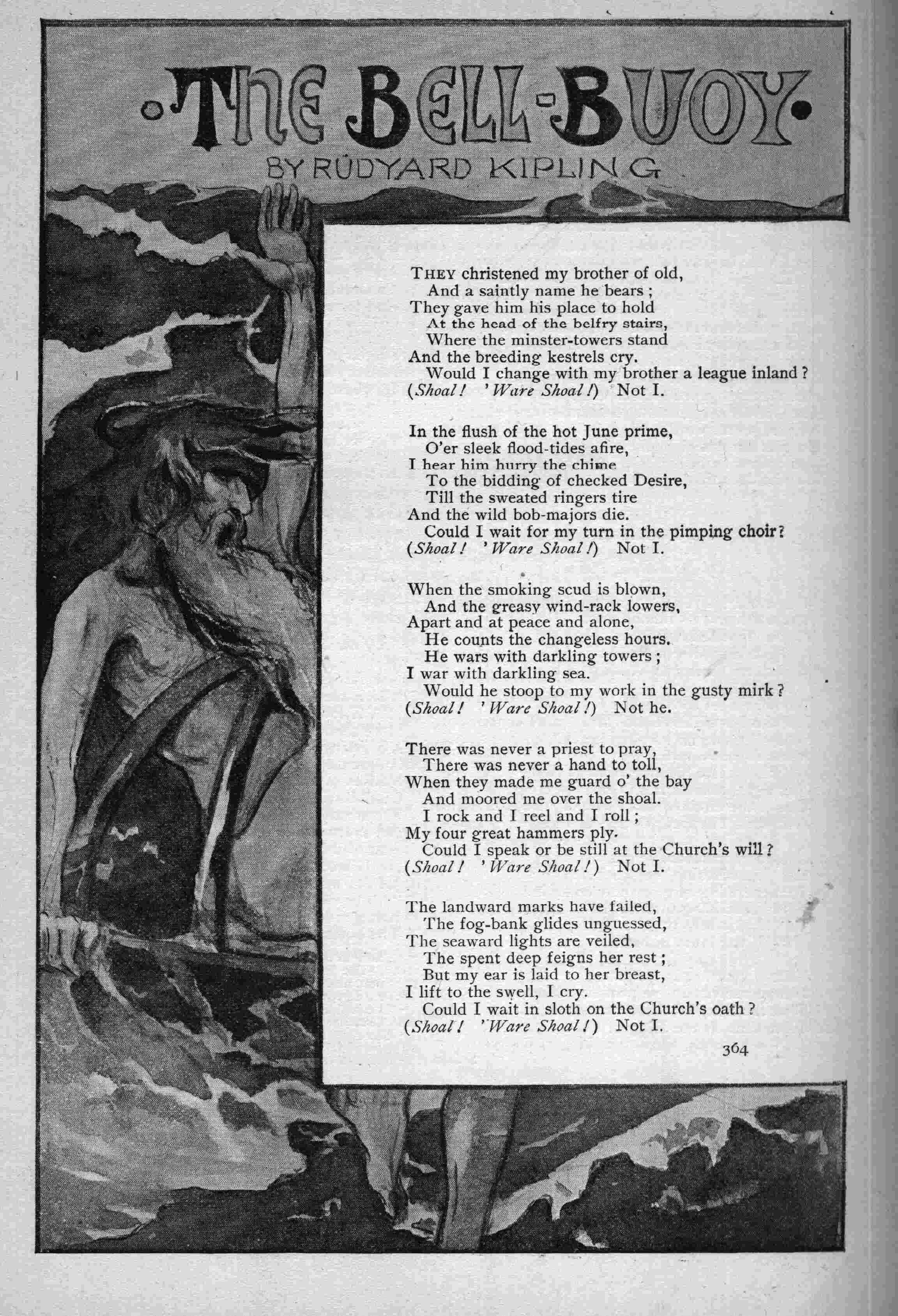
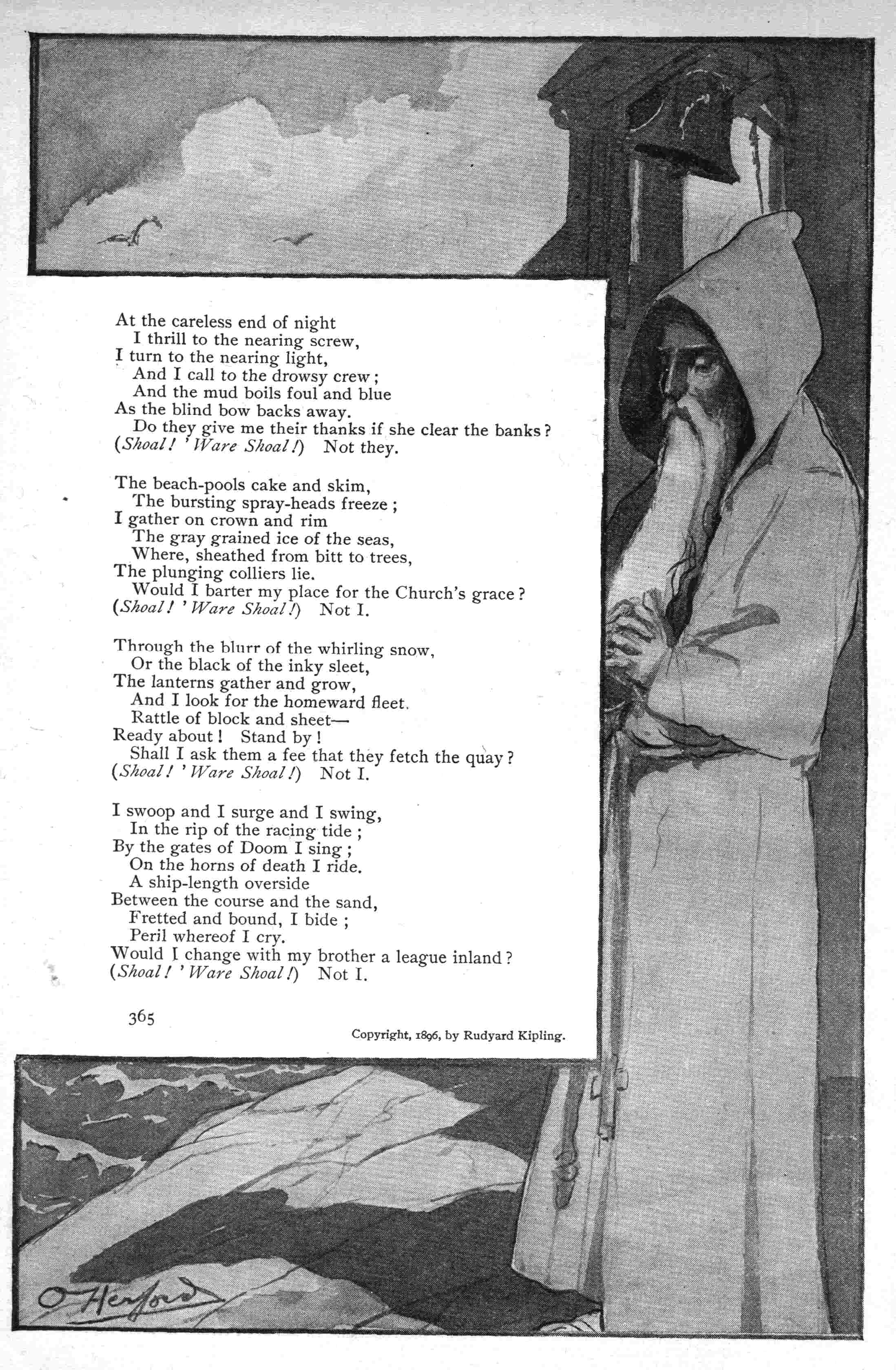
Oliver Herford illustrated Kipling's The Bell Buoy, 1897

"The Bell Buoy" is a poem by Rudyard Kipling. It was first published with illustrations in Saturday Review, Christmas Supplement 1896 and then published in McClure's Magazine in February 1897 as "The Bell-Buoy", with illustrations by Oliver Herford. It was also included in the 1903 collection The Five Nations.

Some changes to the wording occurred sometime between the edition in McClure's and when it was collected in Rudyard Kipling's verse: inclusive edition, 1885-1918 (1919) as "The Bell Buoy". The other changes are minor and some may be the correction of printing errors.

T. S. Eliot included the poem in his 1941 collection A Choice of Kipling's Verse.

In the poem, a fog bell on a buoy above a shoal compares itself to a church bell and decides it does not want to "change with my brother a league inland". The church bell, controlled by the authority of the church, would have to fight with "darkling Powers" instead of independently doing its vital work and struggling with the darkling sea.
