= Fog bell =

Audible aid to navigation in poor visibility

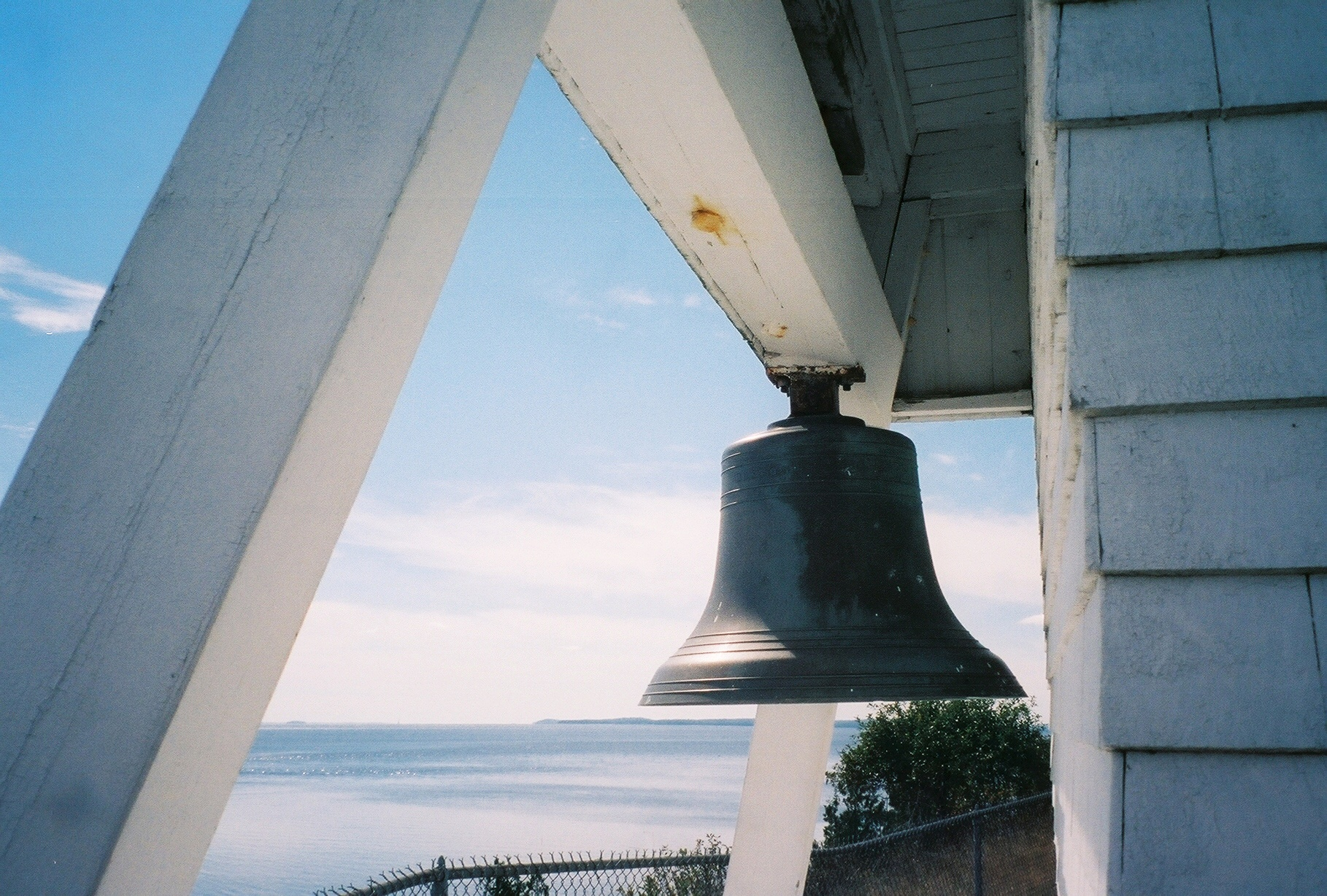
Fog bell at Fort Point Light, Stockton Springs, Maine

A fog bell is a navigation mark used as an audible aid to navigation in seafaring, especially in fog and poor visibility. Floating navigation signs with bells are called bell buoys. On ships, the ship's bell is used for sound signals. Due to more suitable sound generators, but also the development and spread of radar, satellite navigation and electronic charting systems, fog bells have lost their importance for maritime navigation.

== Maritime marks on land ==
Starting in the 18th century, fog signals were given for seafaring in Europe, initially with cannons or guns. In 1766, the first bell for this purpose was installed in Nidingen on the Baltic Sea. These were initially rung by hand, which was a chore during prolonged fog, others used mechanisms similar to clockwork that had to be wound periodically. Andrew Morse Jr. eventually developed a "perpetual fog bell" that was used in 1839 at Penobscot Bay. In order to lift weights upward that struck the bell in the downward motion, a long wooden beam was used, which went up and down with the waves. But the float was quickly carried out to sea. Subsequently, other mechanisms were developed, often either attached to light towers or housed in their own bell towers.

In 1878, there were 93 fog bells in the USA. However, the bells had the problem of low range, especially in windy conditions. In England, most mechanical fog bells were decommissioned around 1905; in the United States in the 1960s. Most bells have since been replaced by much louder foghorns.

Occasionally, fog bells also served for orientation on land, for example, the bell "Maria" helped hikers on the inhospitable plateaus in the Aubrac to find the Hospital of Aubrac in France.

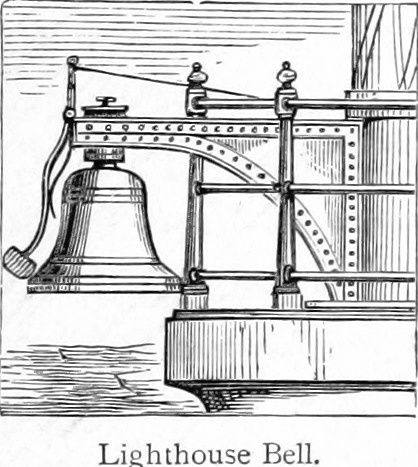
Bell on a lighthouse, sketch from 1884.

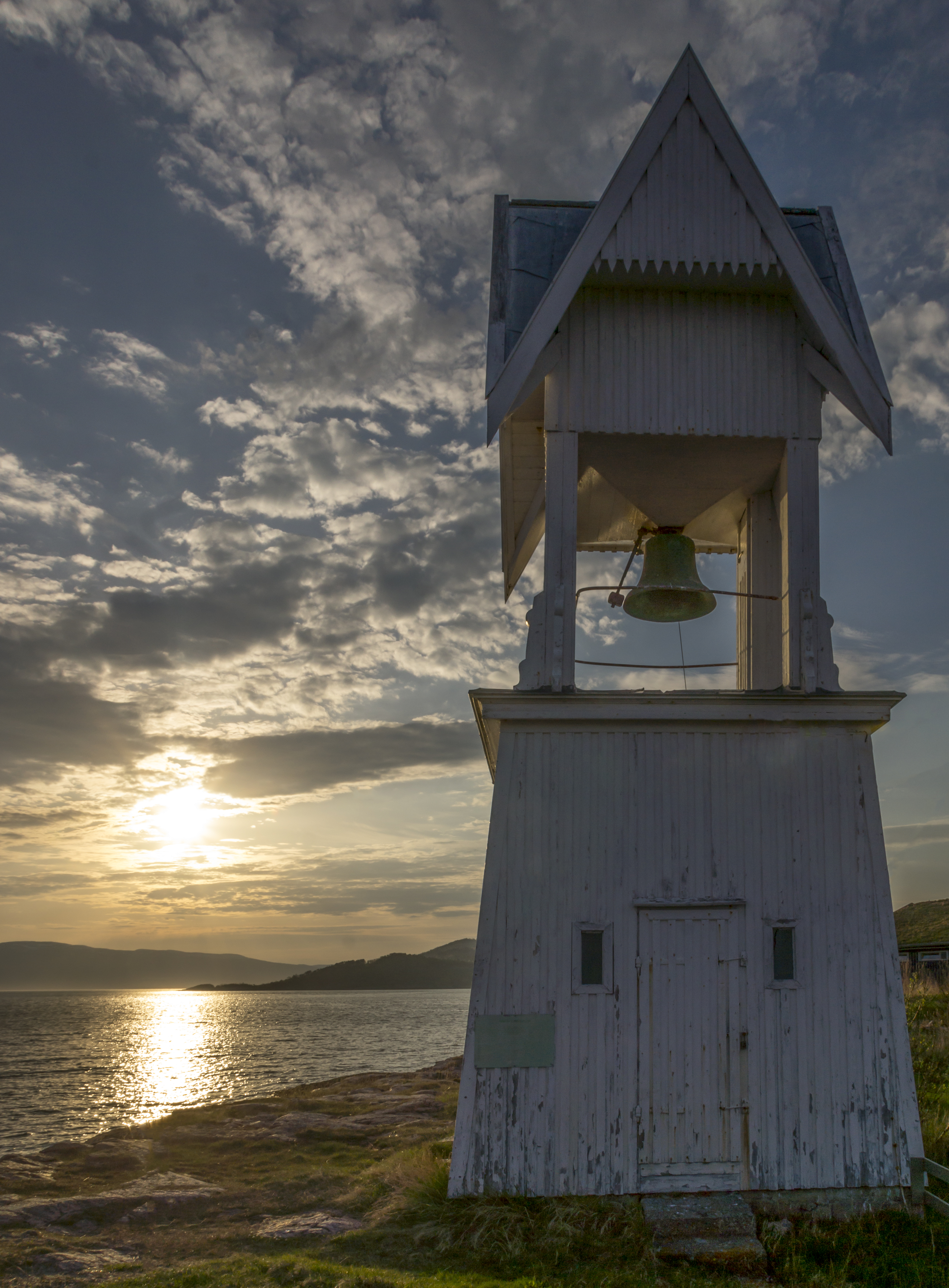
Bell tower Rødberg near Stadsbygd in Indre Fosen Municipality on the Trondheim Fjord in Norway

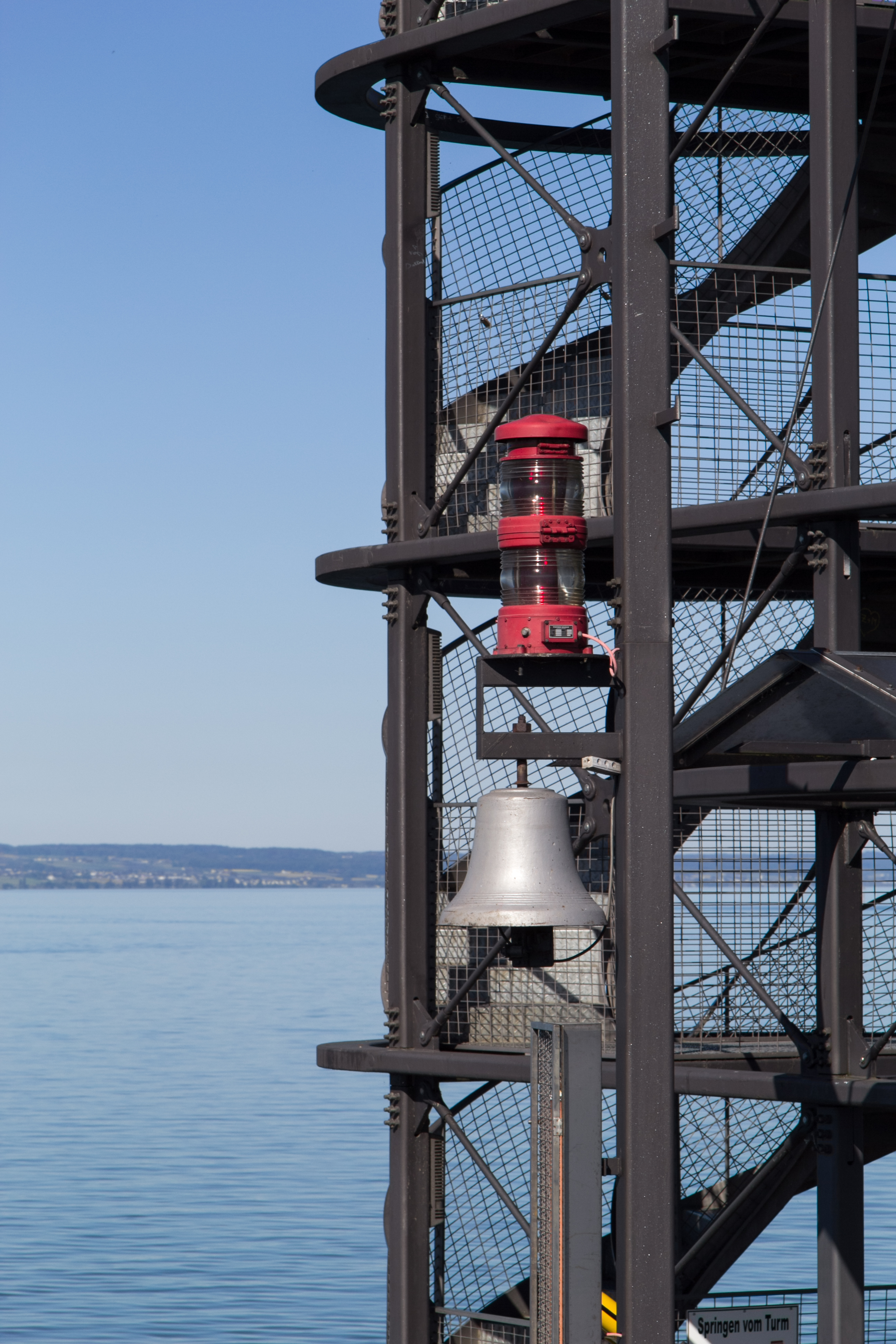
Lighting and bell at Moleturm in Friedrichshafen

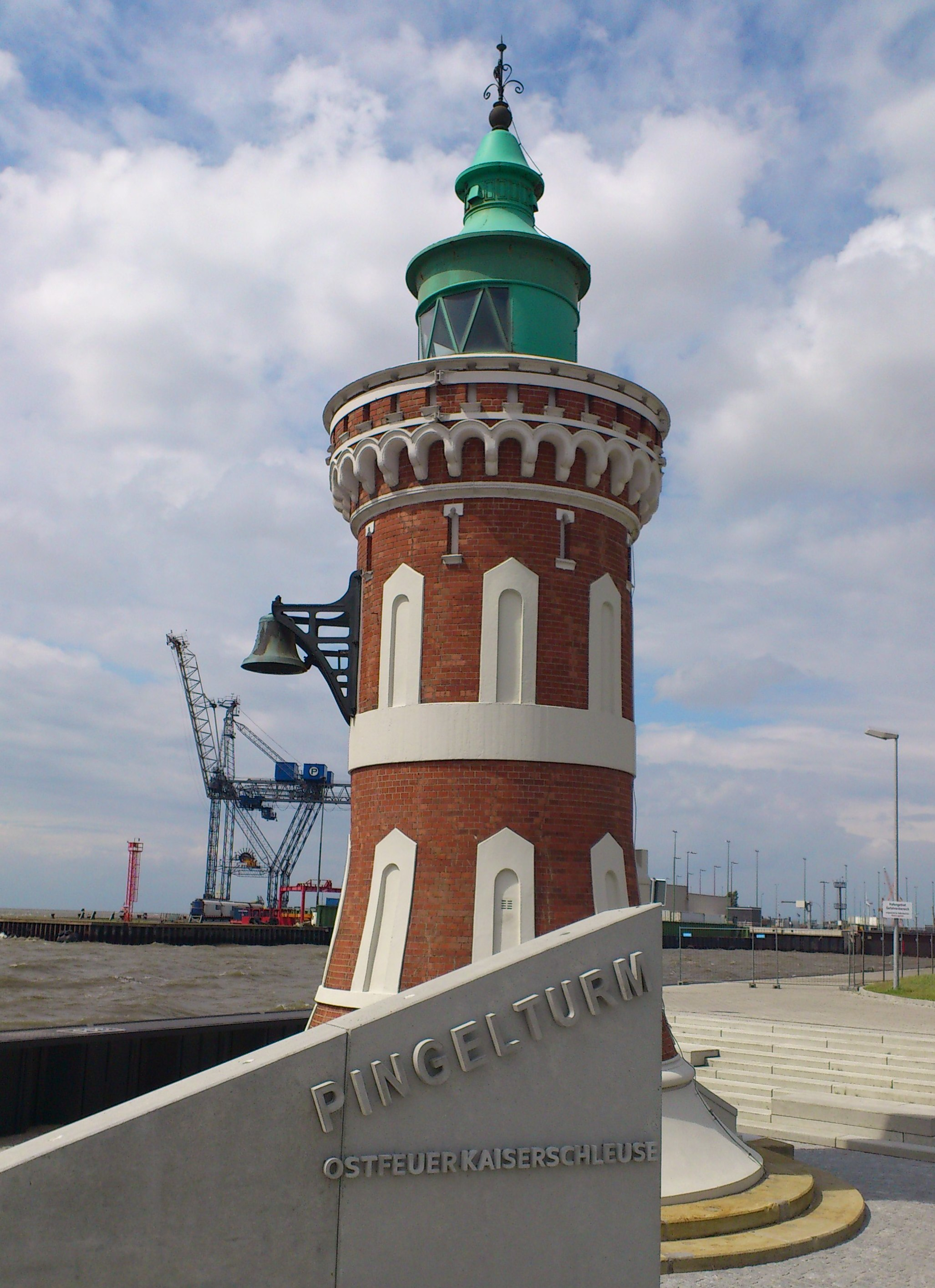
"Pingelturm" in Bremerhaven

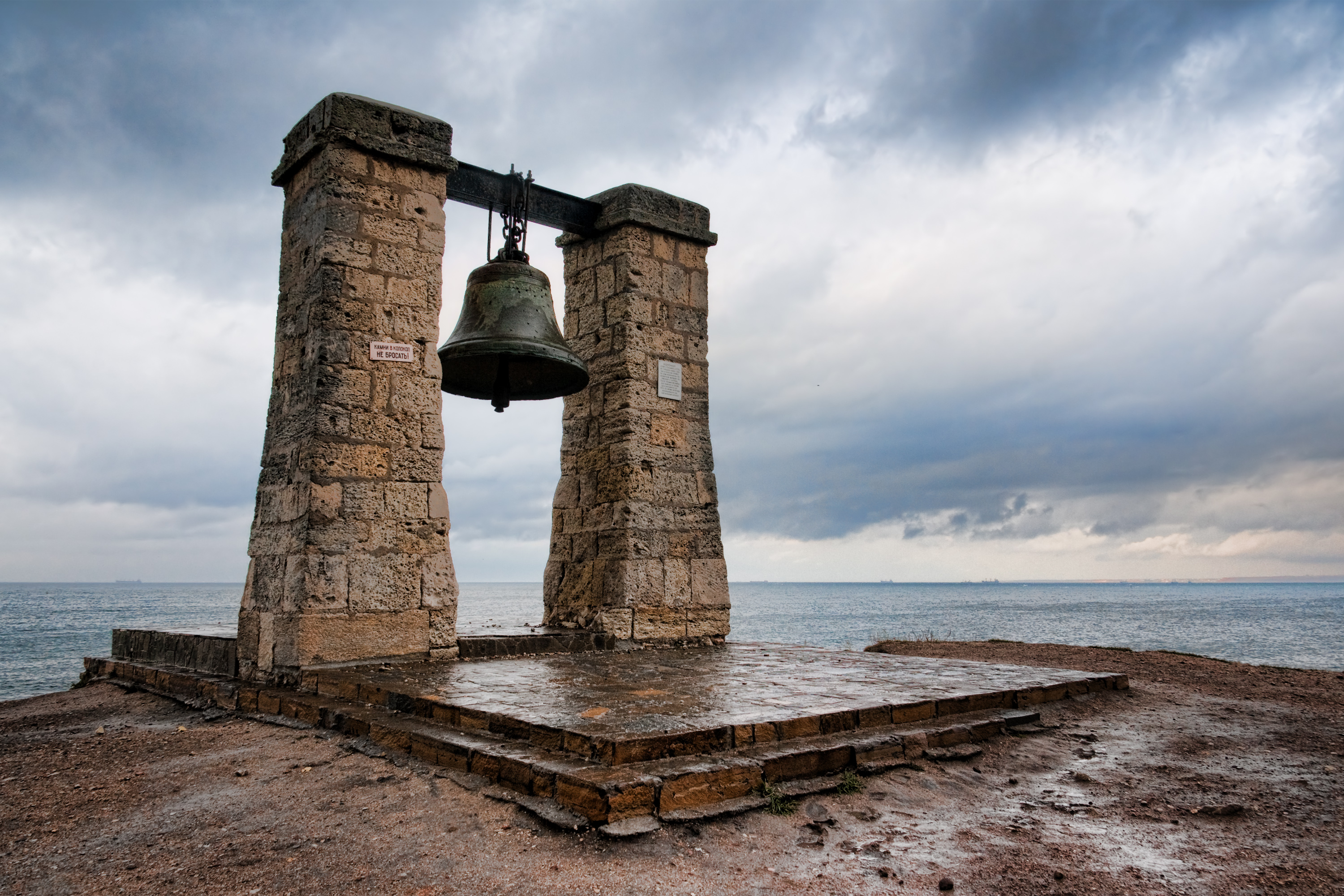
Fog bell of Chersonesos, symbol of Sevastopol (Crimea), cast from Turkish cannons in 1778.

== Floating bell buoys ==
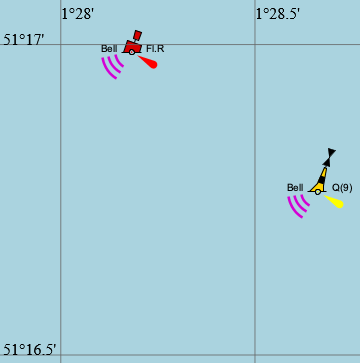
OpenSeaMap sea chart showing a port buoy and a west cardinal, an indicator for a sound signal and the label Bell

A bell buoy is a floating sea mark with a bell that is made to sound by the swell. It belongs to the sound buoys and, by shape, to the beacon buoys. In nautical charts, bell buoys are designated Bell. The development of these floating sea marks dates back to the 19th century. Initially, small boats were fitted with bells and anchored. The first true bell buoy was developed in 1852 by Lieutenant Brown, who worked at the Lighthouse Establishment. He took a buoy and constructed a mount for the bell, under which he placed a plate with radial grooves on which a cannonball rolled and, moved by the swell, struck the bell. A bell buoy was first used in 1855. Today's bell barrels usually have several movable mallets attached to the outside of the bell.

Thus, these sound buoys were in use before the light buoys, which were produced from 1876. The same purpose as bell buoys is served by the whistle buoys invented in 1876, as well as gong buoys, invented in 1921. The latter have three or four flat bells mounted vertically above each other with different pitches, making them acoustically distinguishable from single bells. They are used exclusively in the United States and are listed on nautical charts with the label Gong. Experiments during this period to strike the bells electrically or to replace them outright with electric signaling systems were unsuccessful because the electronics were disturbed by swell and salt water.

Bell buoys are usually made to ring irregularly by the swell and then have no fixed characteristic. Only occasionally are special striking mechanisms with regular chimes used. Sound buoys are mainly suitable as safe water marks for the entrances of nautical channels from the sea. The last bell buoy of the Weser district was moved to the German Maritime Museum in Bremerhaven in 2006. In the Kiel Fjord there is a bell buoy off Laboe at a shoal.

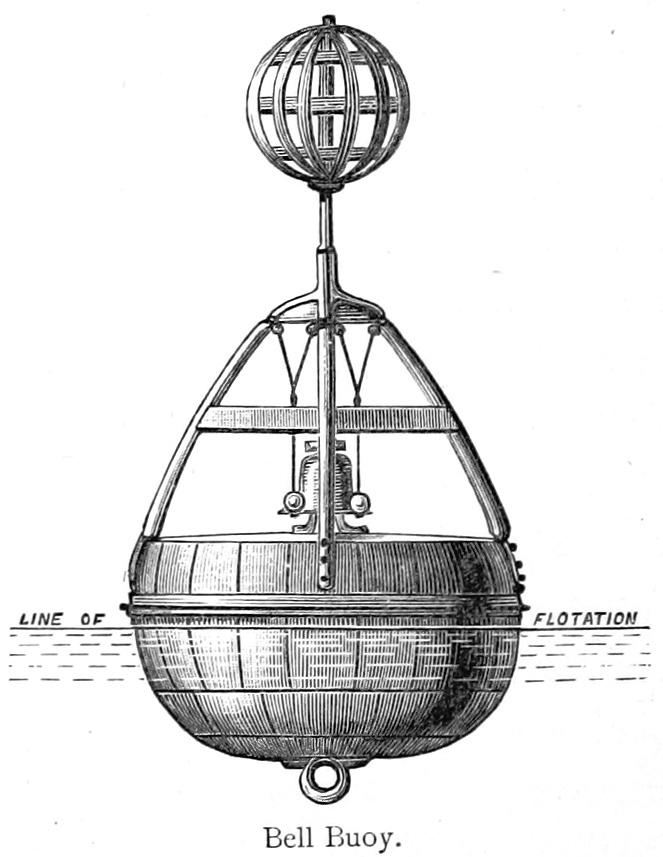
Sketch from a British sea mark directory, 1884

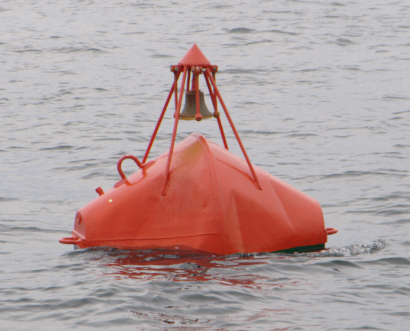
Bell buoy in the Kiel Fjord off Laboe

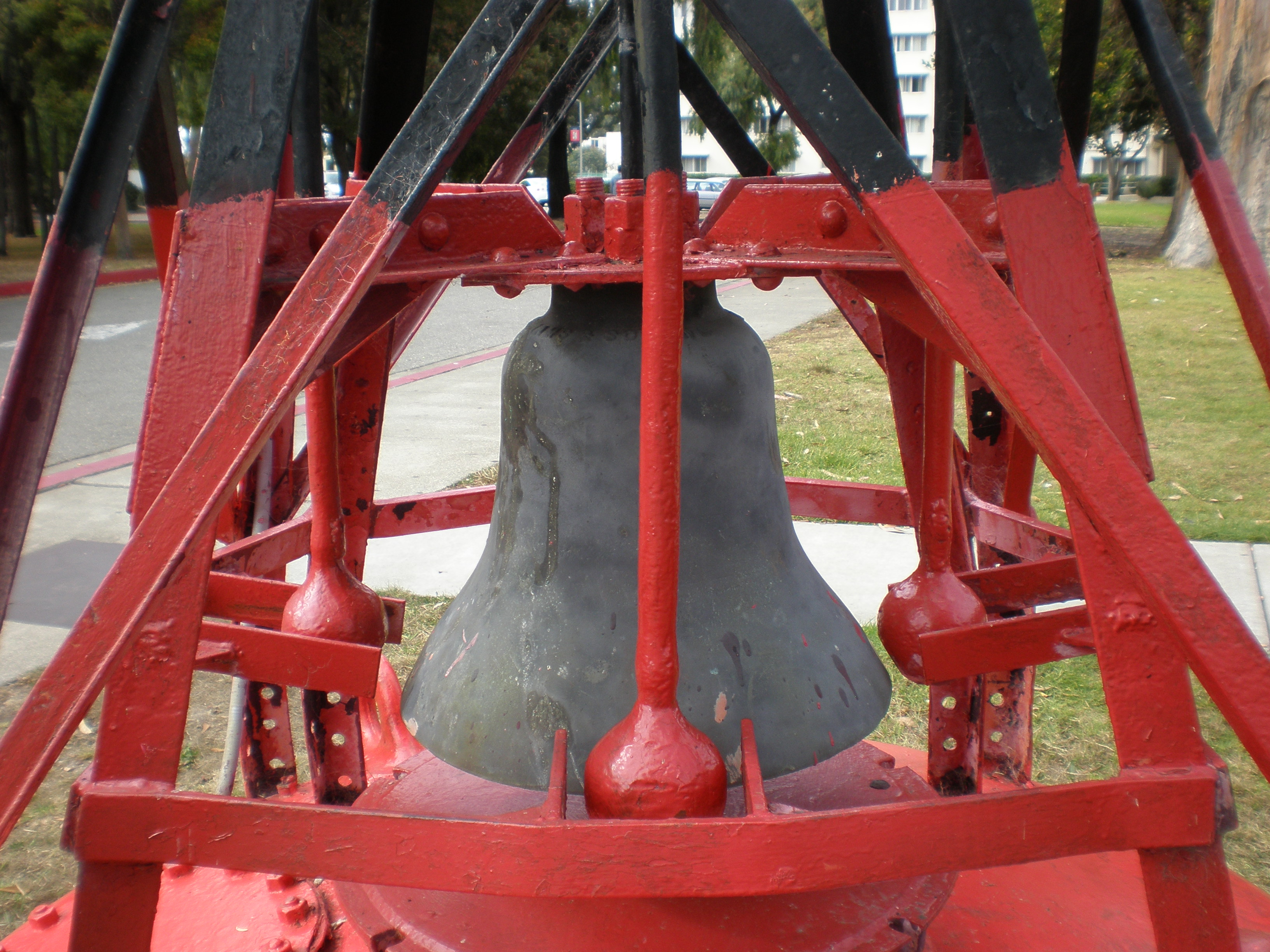
Bell with four mallets of a buoy displayed on Treasure Island, California

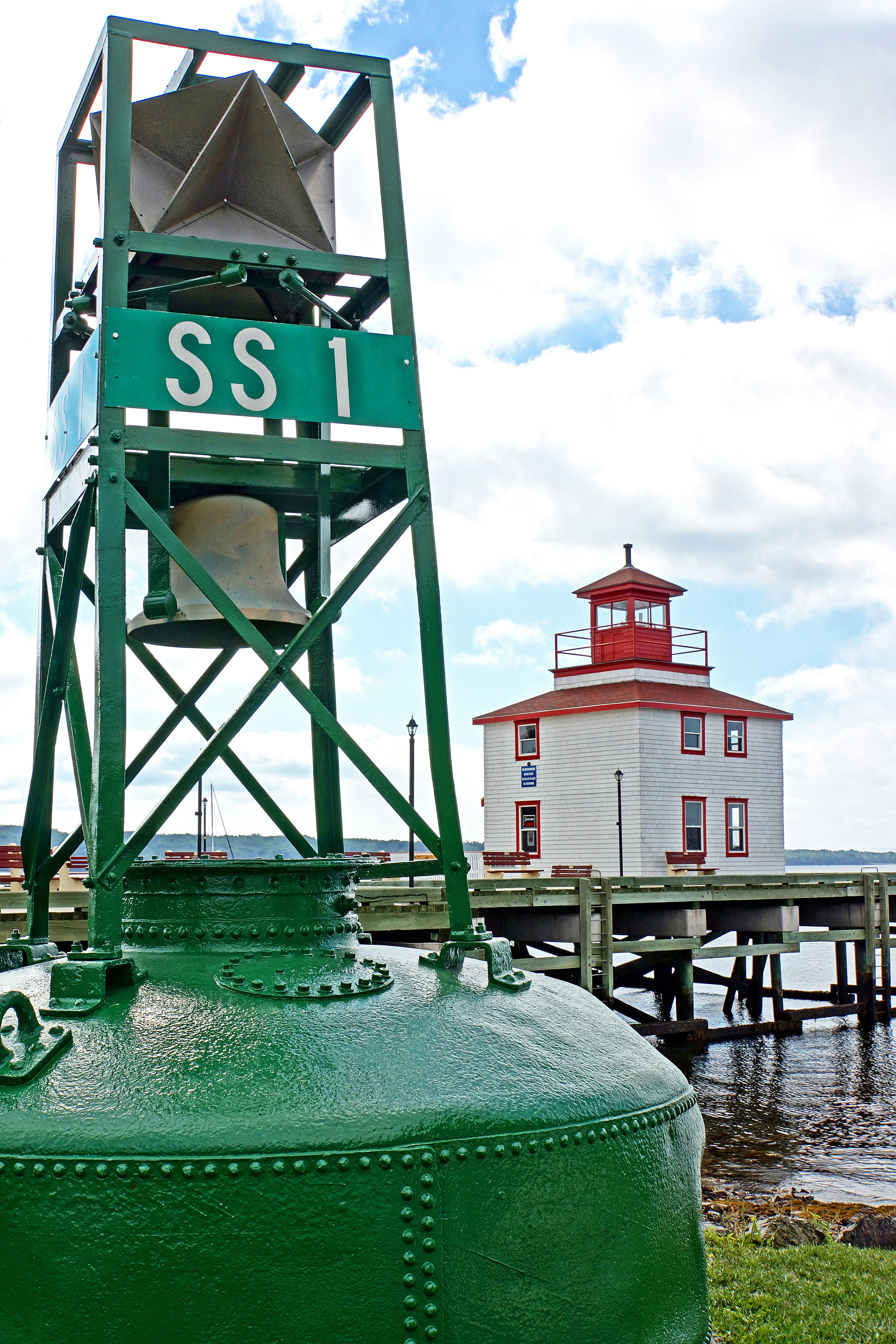
Bell buoy at Pictou Lighthouse Museum, Nova Scotia, Canada

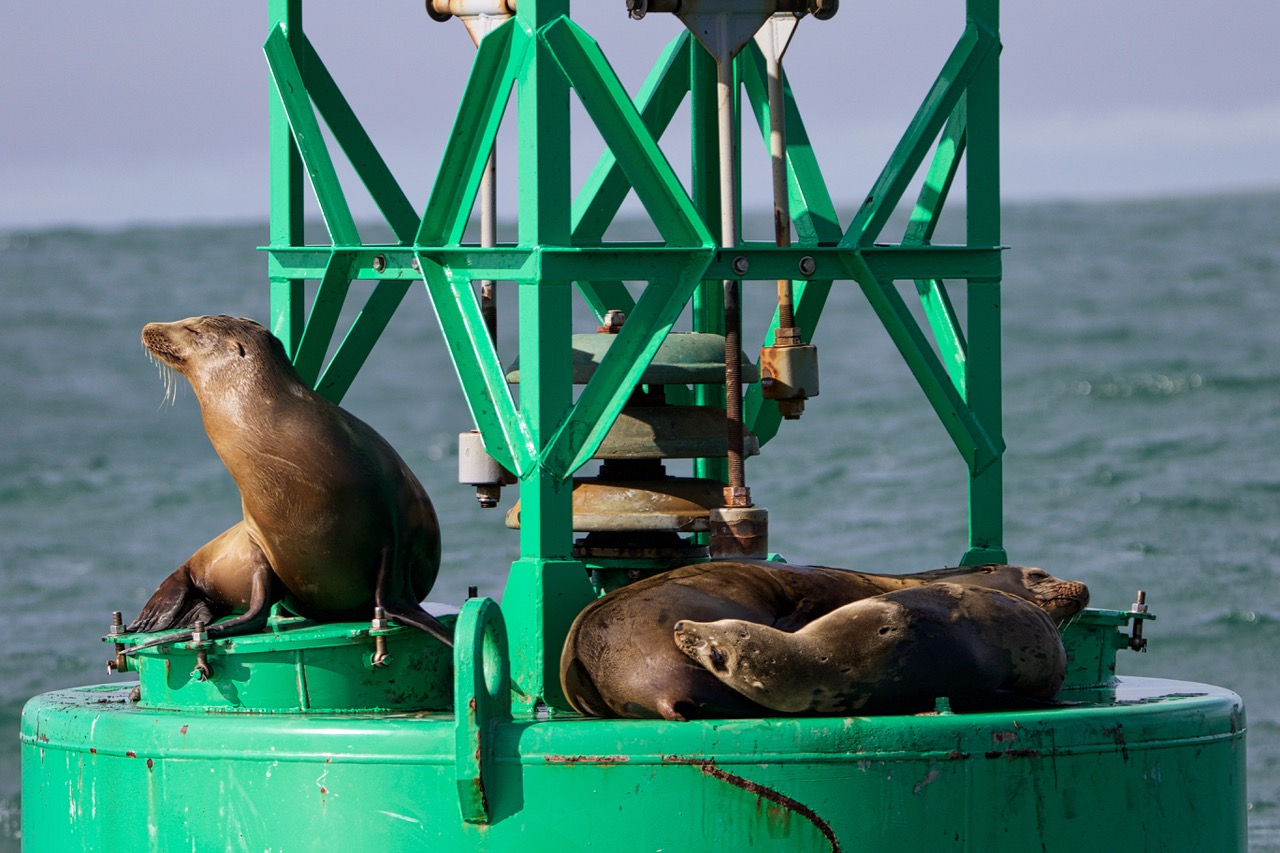
"Gong buoy" with multiple bells and California sea lions

== Bells for submarine signals ==
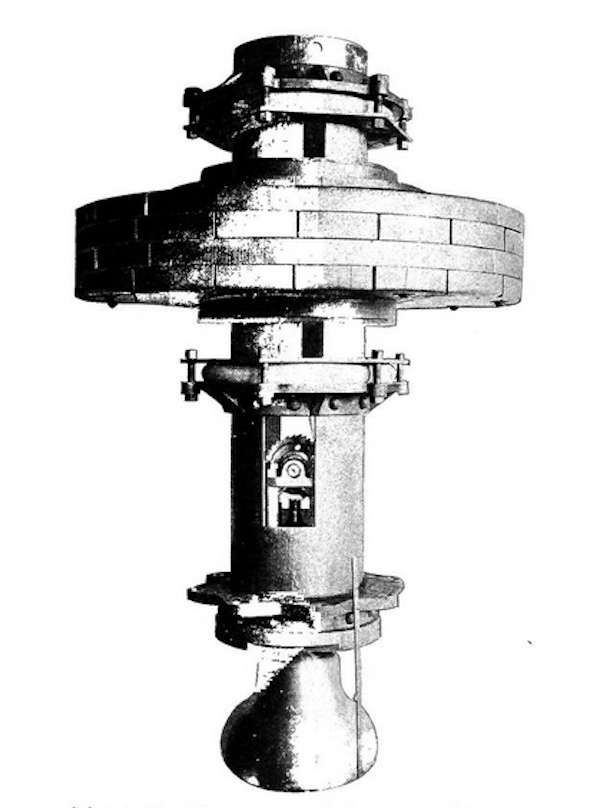
Submarine bell apparatus to be attached to bell buoys

Experiments with bells underwater were first undertaken in 1826 in Lake Geneva by Charles-François Sturm and Jean-Daniel Colladon to determine the speed of sound. In the late 19th century, bells began to be installed on lightvessels below the surface of the water, the sound of which was received by ships in the fog using stethoscopes or microphones. This development of submarine signals was spurred in 1901 by the founding of the Submarine Signal Co. in Boston and the development of hydrophones by Elisha Gray, among others. The advantage is that sound propagation under water is much straighter than in air, making location more accurate. However, the bells were soon replaced by electric transducers, and the ideas of subsurface sound generation and detection were used by Reginald Fessenden to develop sonars.

== Prevalence of fog bells ==
In the free nautical chart OpenSeaMap, 175 seamarks with bells as fog signals have been entered by volunteers, compared to 12 gongs, 14 diaphones, 99 whistles, 103 sirens and 787 foghorns (as of April 2024). However, these figures are incomplete and at best are only suitable for comparing the significance of the individual sound signals with each other.

== Fog bells in literature ==
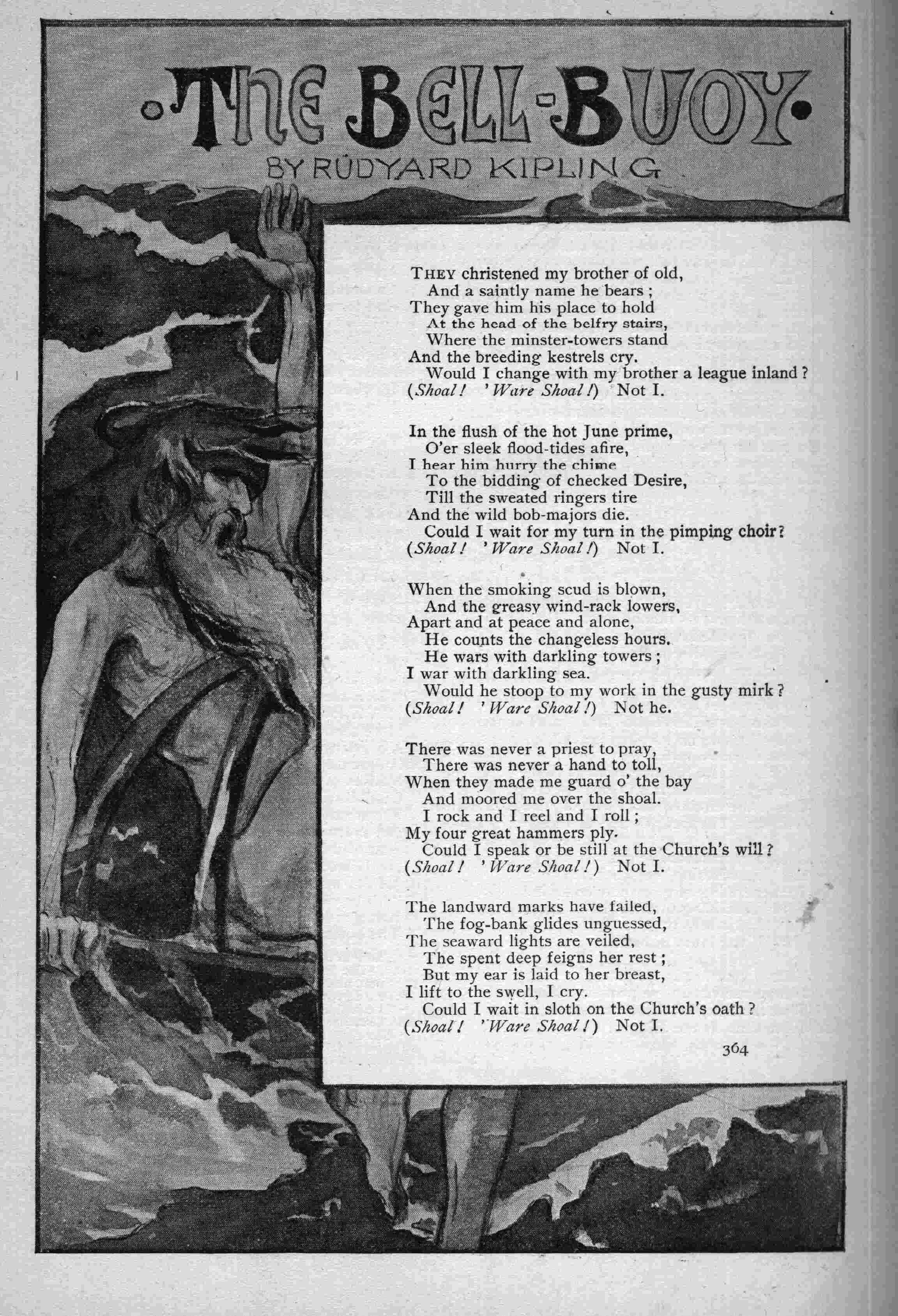
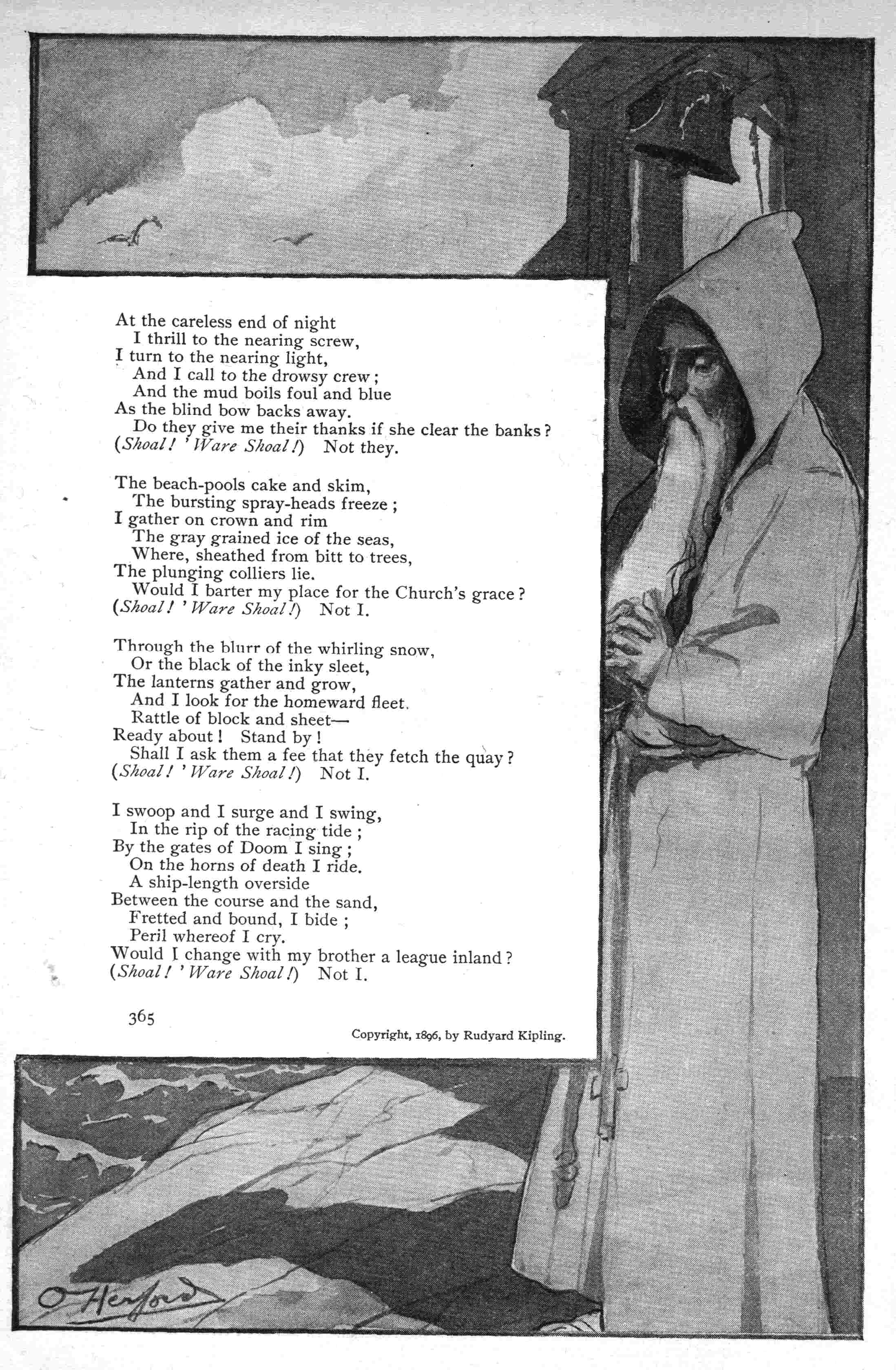
Oliver Herford illustrated Kipling's The Bell Buoy, 1897

The British writer Rudyard Kipling (1865-1936) wrote the poem The Bell Buoy, in which the bell on a bell buoy on a shoal compares itself to a church bell and decides it does not want to "change with my brother a league inland". The church bell, controlled by the authority of the church, would have to fight with "darkling Powers" instead of independently doing its vital work and struggling with the darkling sea.

In the poem "The Dry Salvages", T.S. Eliot references fog bells several times, in keeping with the varied nautical images used throughout the poem. In Part 1, Eliot references a bell which "measures time not our time...a time older than the time of chronometers" rung by the swelling of the ocean which "is and was from the beginning". In Part II, Eliot again references the "undeniable clamour of the bell of the last annunciation" heard by unidentified mariners as their boat drifts, slowly leaking. Finally, in Part IV, a prayer to the Blessed Virgin Mary, Eliot likens a fog bell to a "perpetual Angelus".
