= Alexander Nevsky Church, Copenhagen =

Coordinates: 55.68528°N 12.59081°E

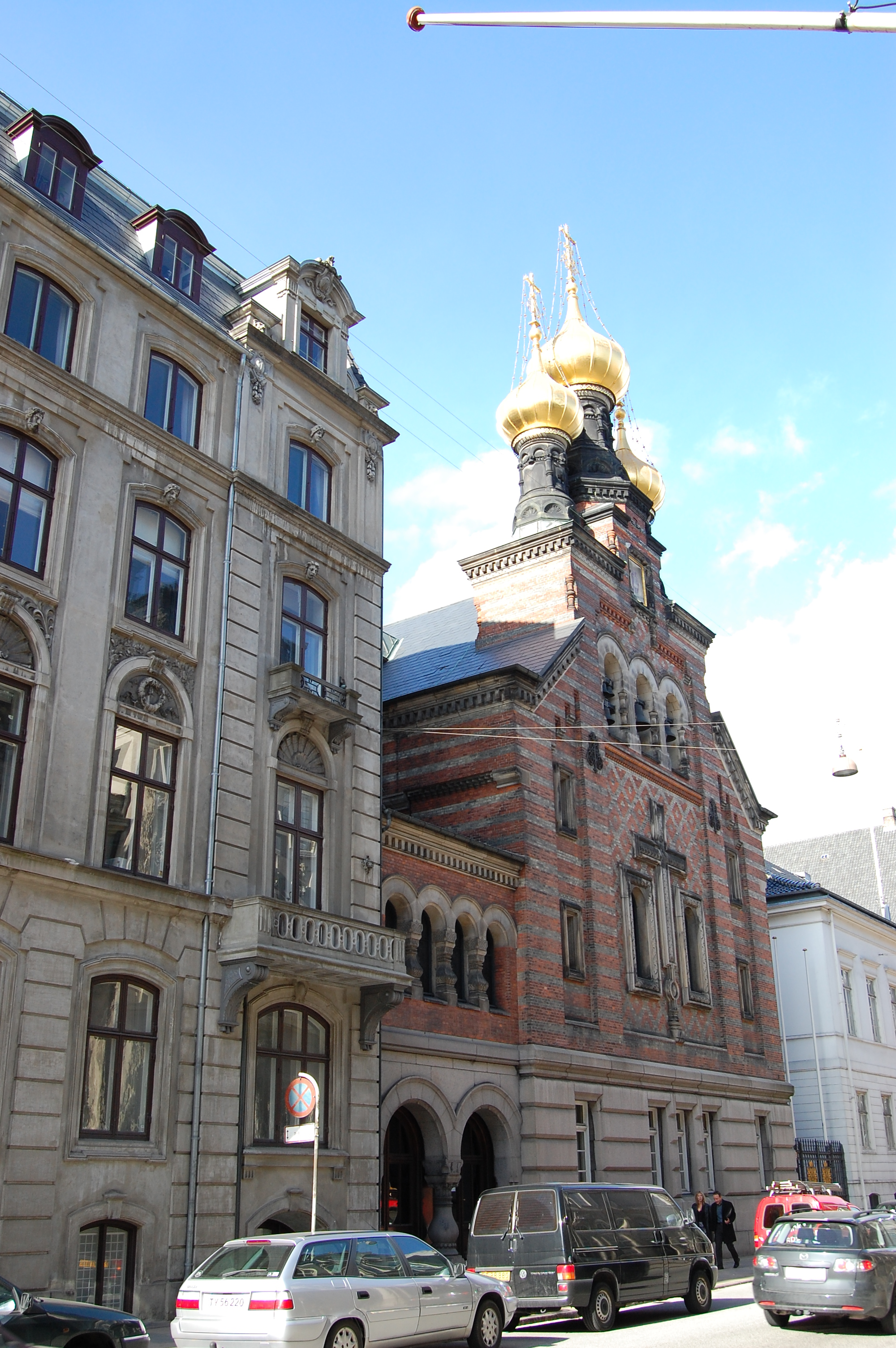
- The facade seen from Bredgade
- Alexander Nevsky Church, Copenhagen
- Location: Bredgade 53; Copenhagen
- Country: Denmark
- Denomination: Russian Orthodox Church

Architecture
- Architect: David Ivanovitj Grimm
- Style: Historicism, Muscowite Revival
- Years built: 1883

The Alexander Nevsky Church (Danish: Skt. Aleksander Nevskij Kirke) is the only Russian Orthodox church in Copenhagen. It was built by the Russian Government between 1881 and 1883, prompted by Princess Dagmar of Denmark's marriage to Alexander Alexandrovich on 9 November 1866 and their later ascent to the Russian throne as Tsar Alexander III of Russia and Tsaritsa Maria Feodorovna. The church is dedicated to the Russian patron saint Alexander Nevsky.

== History ==
From the middle of the 18th century, the Russian delegation held services in Copenhagen, first in a small chapel in Laksegade and later in Store Kongensgade. The Alexander Nevsky Church was built from 1881 to 1883 by the Russian government; Tsar Alexander III personally provided funds for the construction, a project prompted by his Danish-born wife Maria Feodorovna, a daughter of Christian IX of Denmark. The acquisition of the site on Bredgade (Broad Street) was arranged by Carl Frederik Tietgen and it has been reported that the Tsar disapproved of the selected location for religious reasons, since tradition called for a free-standing building.

The church was designed by Russian architect David Ivanovich Grimm who was a professor at the Imperial Academy of Arts in Saint Petersburg. His project had previously been chosen among 15 entries in architectural competition. The Danish architect Albert Nielsen was charged with the practical execution of the building under supervision of Ferdinand Meldahl.

In September 1883 Provost Yanysev, Chancellor of the Theological Academy in St. Petersburg, came to Copenhagen to consecrate the church, assisted by the congregation's priest and a monk from Alexander Nevsky Lavra in St. Petersburg. Representatives of the Danish, Russian and Greek Royal families were present at the ceremony.

The parish is under the jurisdiction of the German Diocese of the Russian Orthodox Church Outside of Russia (ROCOR). Metropolitan Mark (Arndt) of Berlin and Germany is the current parish rector.

== Architecture ==
The exterior of the church is dominated by the three onion domes which top the gable facing the street. The design takes its inspiration from 17th century Muscovite architecture. The facade is executed in red and grey bricks with sandstone ornamentations. High on the facade, in a niche above the bells, is an icon of Alexander Nevsky, the church's patron saint, painted by Fyodor Bronnikov.

== See also ==
- Embassy of Russia in Copenhagen
