= Chersonesus =

Ancient Greek colonial ruins in Sevastopol, Crimea

- Χερσόνησος; Херсонес
- Chersonese, Chersonesos, Cherson, Korsun
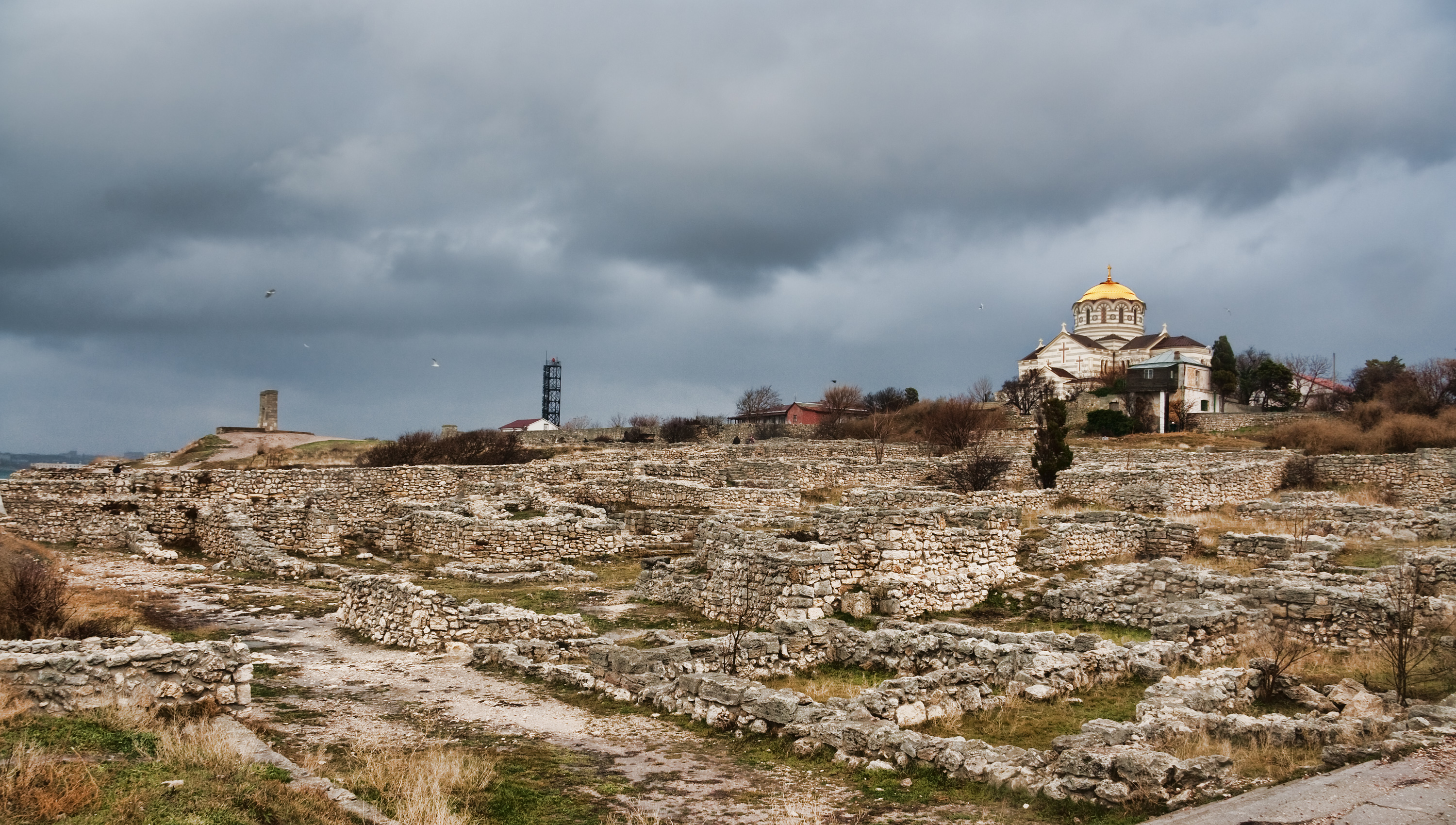
- St. Vladimir's Cathedral overlooks the extensive excavations of Chersonesus.

- Location within Sevastopol Location within Ukraine Location within Russia
- 44°36′42″N 33°29′36″E
- Type: Settlement
- Periods: Classical Greece to Late Middle Ages
- Cultures: Greek, Roman, Hunnic, Byzantine
- Location: Gagarinsky District, Sevastopol
- Region: Taurica
- Part of: National Reserve "Khersones Tavriiskyi"

History
- Built: 6th century BC
- Built by: Settlers from Heraclea Pontica
- Abandoned: Around 1400 AD

Site notes
- Area: 30 ha (74 acres)
- Excavation dates: 1827
- Management: The National Preserve of Tauric Chersonesos
- Website: www.chersonesos.org

UNESCO World Heritage Site
- Official name: Ancient city of Tauric Chersonese
- Part of: Ancient City of Tauric Chersonese and its Chora
- Criteria: Cultural: ii, v
- Reference: 1411
- Inscription: 2013 (37th Session)
- Endangered: 2026–present
- Area: 42.8 ha (0.165 sq mi)
- Buffer zone: 207.2 ha (0.800 sq mi)
- Website: chersonesos-sev.ru

Immovable Monument of National Significance of Ukraine
- Official name: Комплекс "Стародавнє місто Херсонес-Таврійський" (Complex of the Ancient city of Chersonesus Taurica)
- Type: Archaeology
- Reference no.: 270001-Н

Chersonesus, (Note: Ancient Greek: Χερσόνησος, romanized: Khersónēsos; Latin: Chersonesus; Russian and Ukrainian: Херсоне́с, Khersones; Old East Slavic: Корсунь, romanized: Korsun.) contracted in medieval Greek to Cherson (Χερσών), was an ancient Greek colony founded approximately 2,500 years ago in the southwestern part of the Crimean Peninsula. Settlers from Heraclea Pontica in Bithynia established the colony in the 6th century BC.

The ancient city was located on the shore of the Black Sea on the outskirts of present-day Sevastopol on the Crimean Peninsula, where it is referred to as Khersones. The site is part of the National Preserve of Tauric Chersonesos. The name Chersonesos in Greek means "peninsula" and aptly describes the site on which the colony was established. It should not be confused with the Tauric Chersonese, a name often applied to the whole of the southern Crimea.

During much of the classical period, Chersonesus operated as a democracy ruled by a group of elected archons and a council called the Damiorgi. As time passed, the government grew more oligarchic, with power concentrated in the hands of the archons. A form of oath sworn by all the citizens from the 3rd century BC onwards has survived to the present day. In 2013 UNESCO listed Chersonesus as a World Heritage Site.

== History ==
=== Greek colony ===
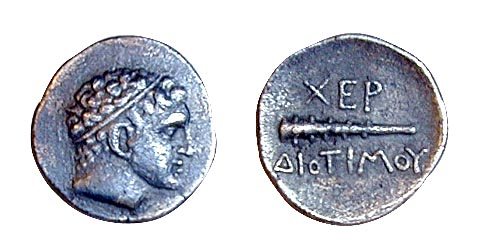
Greek Coin from Chersonesos in Crimea depicting Diotimus wearing the royal diadem r., in exergue, ΧΕΡ ΔΙΟΤΙΜΟΥ Chersonesus in Crimea. 2nd century BCE.

In the 5th century BC, Dorians from Heraclea Pontica on the Black Sea coast of Asia Minor founded the sea port of Chersonesos in southwestern Crimea (outside modern Sevastopol). It was a site with good deep-water harbors located at the edge of the territory of the indigenous Taurians. During much of the Classical Period, Chersonesus was a democracy ruled by a group of elected archons and a council called the Demiurgi. As time passed the government grew more oligarchic, with power concentrated in the hands of the archons. Up to the middle of the 4th century BC, Chersonesos remained a small city. It then expanded to lands in northwest Crimea, incorporating the colony of Kerkinitida and constructing numerous fortifications.

After defending itself against the Bosporan Kingdom, and the native Scythians and Tauri, and even extending its power over the west coast of the peninsula, it was compelled to call in the aid of Mithradates VI and his general Diophantus, c. 110 BC, and submitted to the Bosporan Kingdom. It was subject to Rome and received a garrison from the middle of the 1st century BC until the 370s AD, when it was captured by the Huns.

=== Byzantine era ===
It became a Byzantine possession during the Early Middle Ages and withstood a siege by the Göktürks in 581. Byzantine rule was slight: there was a small imperial garrison more for the town's protection than for its control and it exercised a measure of self-government. It was useful to Byzantium in two ways: it was an observation point to watch the barbarian tribes, and its isolation made it a popular place of exile for those who angered the Roman and later Byzantine governments. Among its more famous "inmates" were Pope Clement I and Pope Martin I, and the deposed Byzantine Emperor Justinian II.

According to Theophanes the Confessor and others, Chersonesus was the residence of a Khazar governor (tudun) in the late 7th century. Between approximately 705 and 840, the city's affairs were managed by elected officials called babaghuq, meaning "father of the city".

In 833, Emperor Theophilus sent the nobleman Petronas Kamateros, who had recently overseen the construction of the Khazar fortress of Sarkel, to take direct control over the city and its environs, establishing the theme of Klimata/Cherson. It remained in Byzantine hands until the 980s, when it reportedly fell to Vladimir the Great of the Kievan Rus'. Vladimir agreed to evacuate the fortress only if Basil II's sister Anna Porphyrogeneta would be given him in marriage. The demand caused a scandal in Constantinople. As a pre-condition for the marriage settlement, Vladimir was baptized here in 988, thus paving the way to the Baptism of Kievan Rus'. Thereafter Korsun' was evacuated.

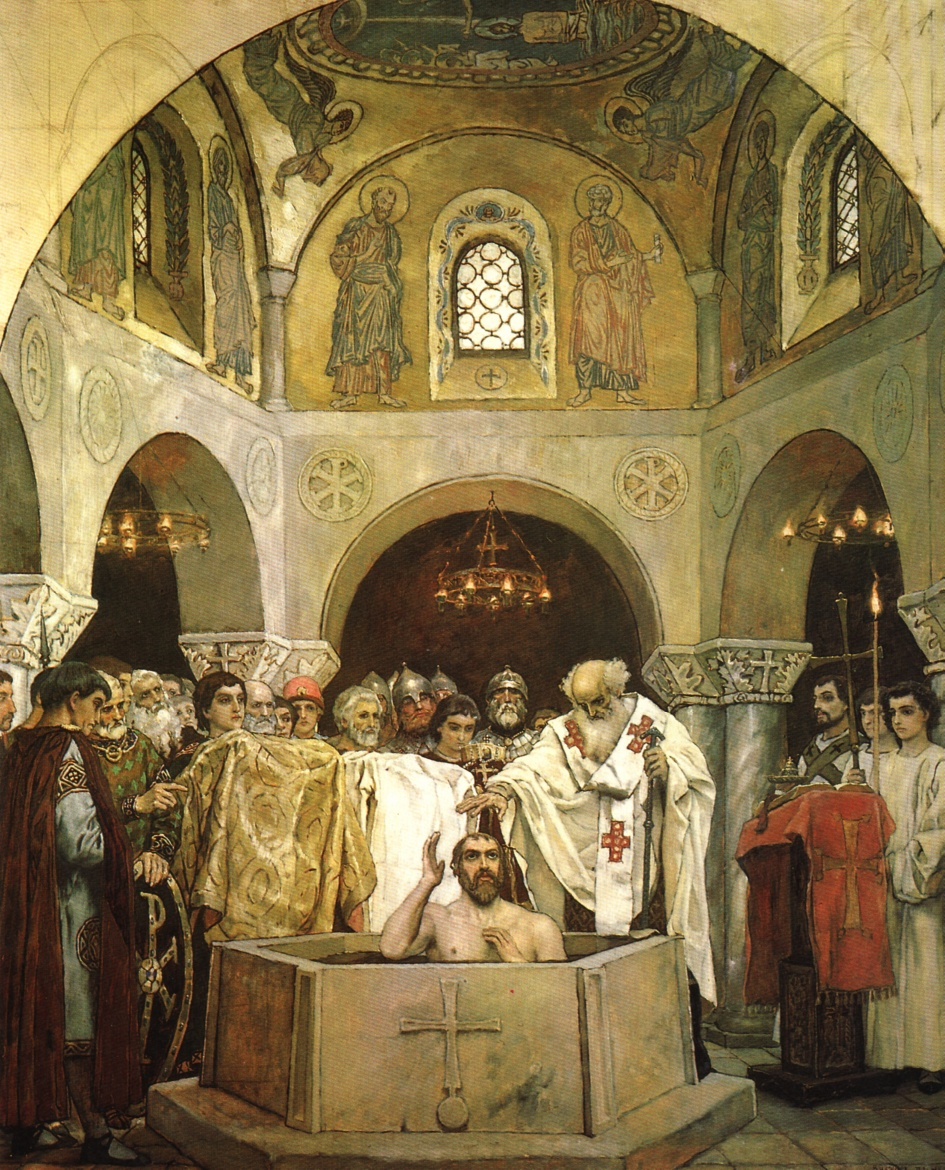
Viktor Vasnetsov: Baptism of Saint Prince Vladimir in Korsun.

Since this campaign is not recorded in Greek sources, historians have suggested that the account actually refers to the events of the Rus'–Byzantine War (1043) and to a different Vladimir. In fact, most valuables looted by the Slavs in Korsun' made their way to Novgorod (perhaps by way of Joachim the Korsunian, the first Novgorodian bishop, as his surname indicates ties to Korsun), where they were preserved in the Cathedral of Holy Wisdom until the 20th century. One of the most interesting items from this "Korsun Treasure" is the copper Korsun Gate, supposedly captured by the Novgorodians in Korsun' and now part of the St. Sophia Cathedral.

After the Fourth Crusade (1202–04), Chersonesus became dependent on the Byzantine Empire of Trebizond as the Principality of Theodoro. After the Siege of Trebizond (1461) the Principality of Theodoro became independent. The city fell under Genoese control in the early 13th century, which forbade the Greeks to trade there. In 1299, the town was sacked by the Mongol armies of Nogai Khan's Golden Horde. Byzantine sources last mention Chersonesus in 1396, and based on archaeological evidence the site is presumed to have been abandoned in the following decades.

== Ecclesiastical history ==
Chersonesus had been a Roman pre-Great Schism, later Greek/Orthodox, episcopal see for centuries, elevated early to the rank of archbishopric, since it is mentioned as such in the Notitiae Episcopatuum; it disappeared after the Turkish conquest in 1475 and the destruction of the city.

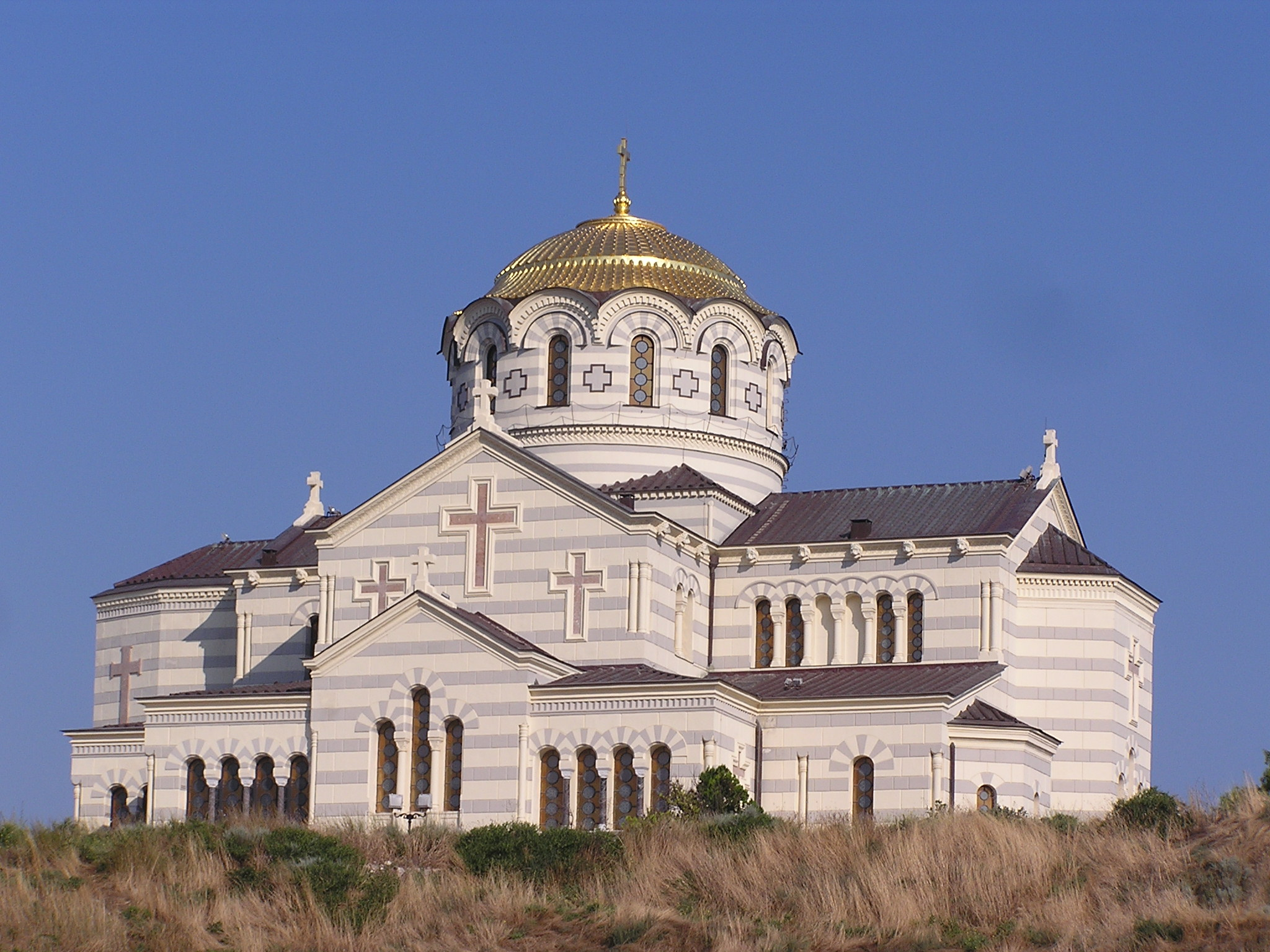
The Saint Vladimir Cathedral in Chersonesus was built in the 19th century in the Byzantine Revival style.

In the late 19th century, the grand Russian Orthodox St Vladimir's Cathedral (completed 1892) was built on a small hill overlooking the site; designed in Byzantine style, it was intended to commemorate the site of Vladimir's baptism.

In 1333, the Roman Catholic Archdiocese of Chersonesus in Zechia was established, but it appears that it had only a bishop, a Dominican called Richard the Englishman. It is today listed by the Catholic Church as a titular archbishopric, and is called specifically Chersonesus in Zechia to avoid confusion with other sees called Chersonesus.

== Remains ==
=== Archaeological site ===
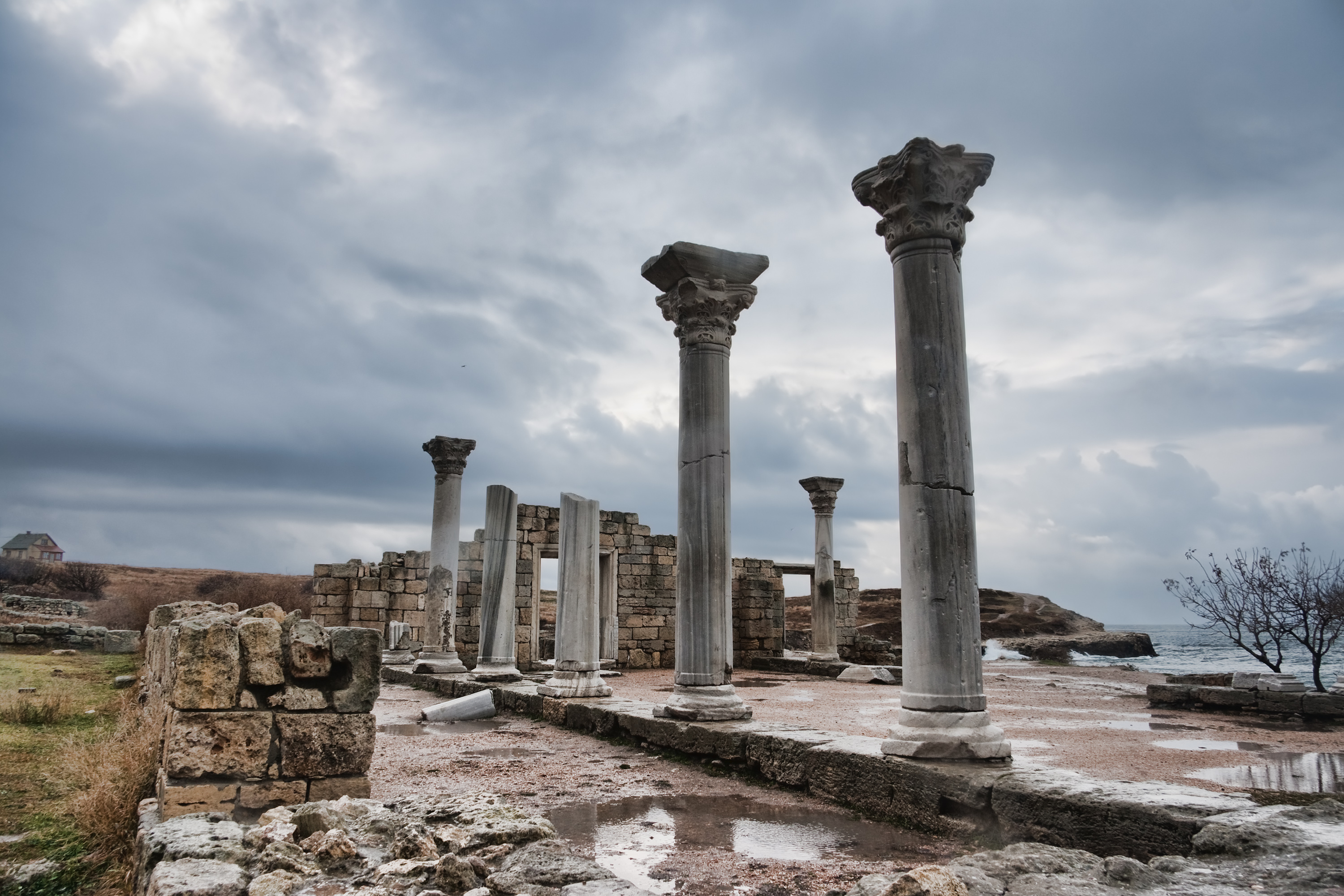
The 1935 Basilica

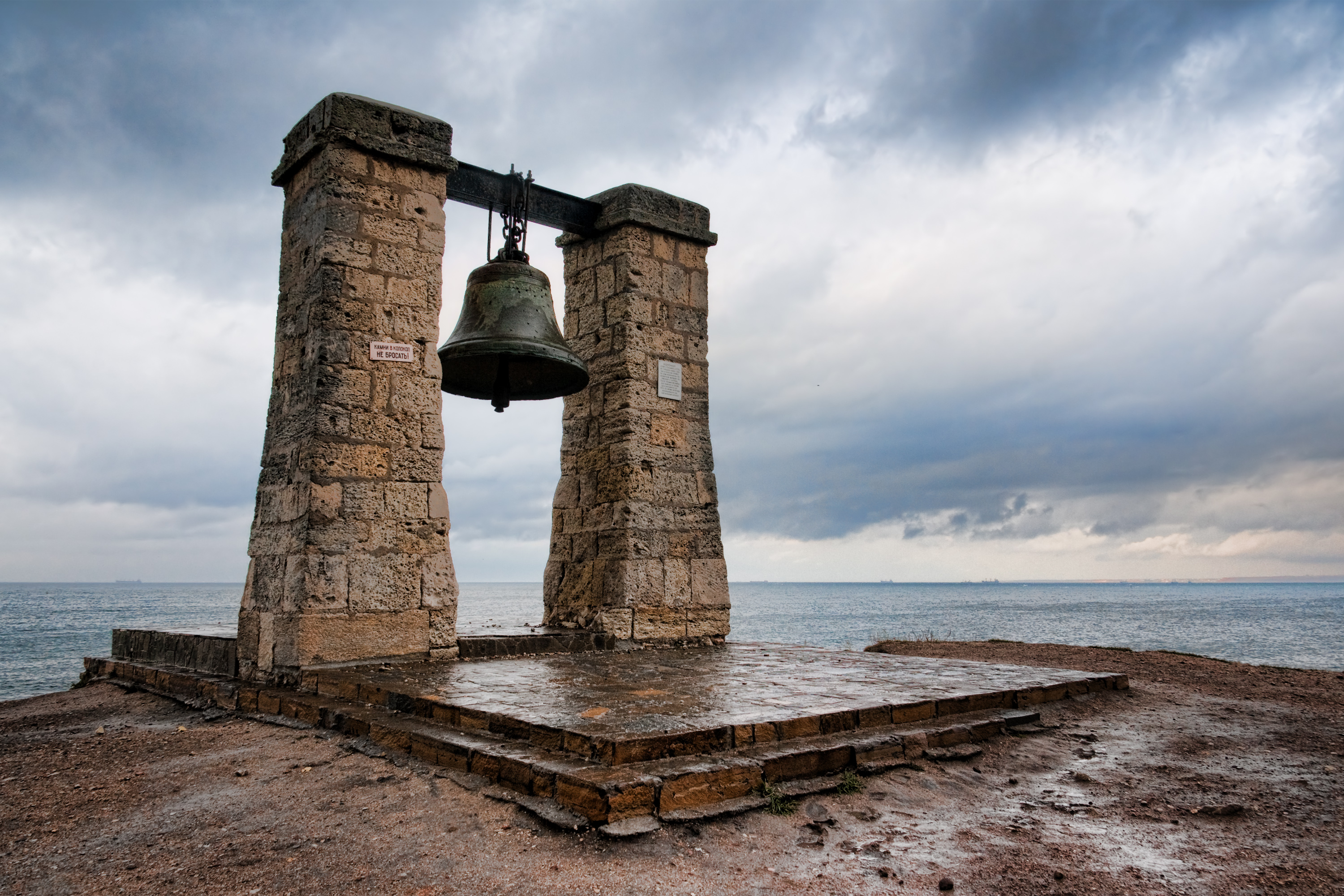
The bell of Chersonesos

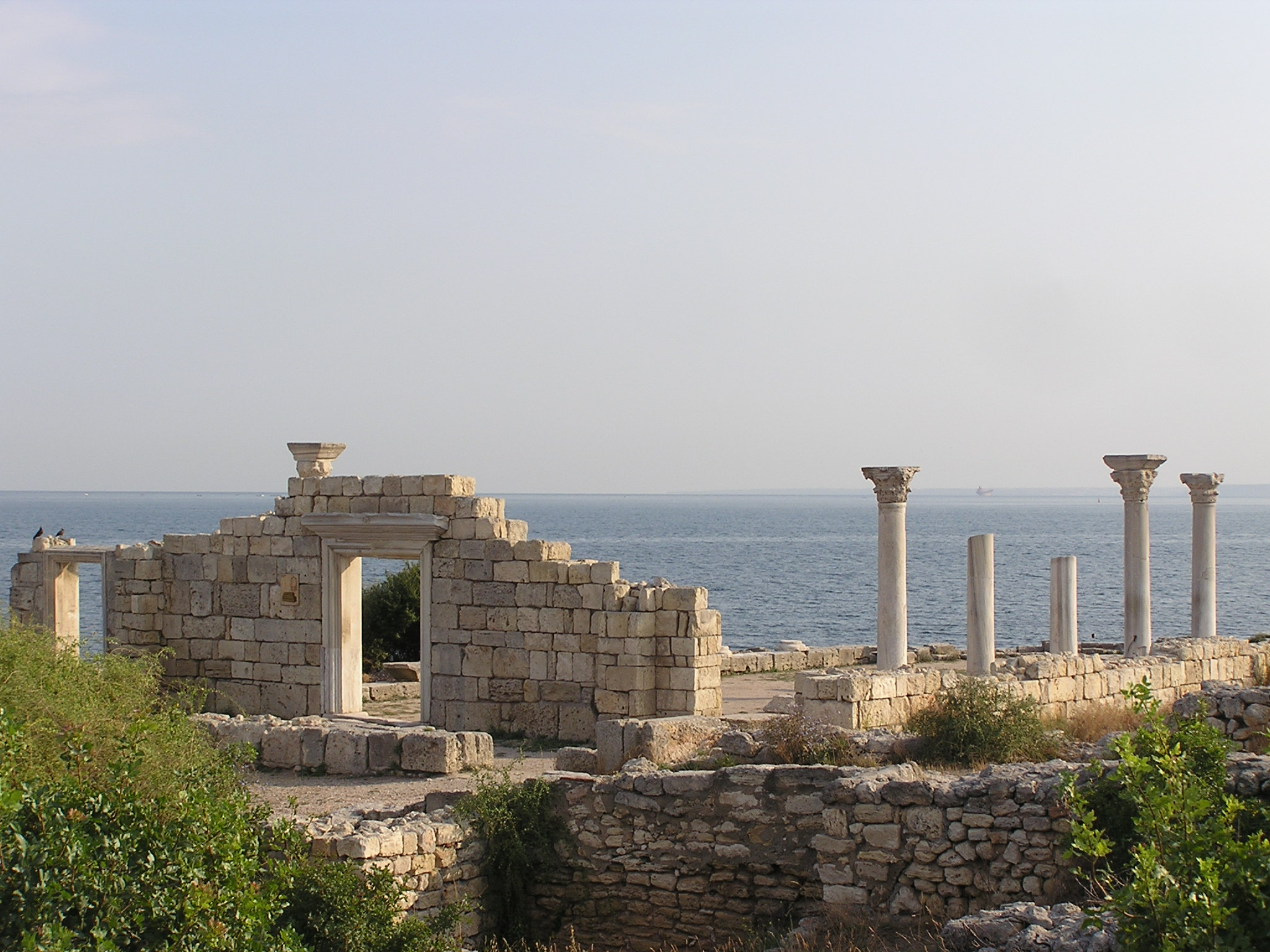
The 1935 Basilica

Chersonesus's ancient ruins are presently located in one of Sevastopol's suburbs. They were excavated by the Russian government, starting from 1827. They are today a popular tourist attraction, protected as an archaeological park.

The buildings mix influences of Greek, Roman and Byzantine culture. The defensive wall was approximately 3.5 kilometres (2.2 mi) long, 3.5 to 4 metres wide and 8 to 10 metres high with towers at a height of 10 to 12 metres. The walls enclosed an area of about 30 hectares (74 acres). Buildings include a Roman amphitheatre and a Greek temple. The fact that the site has not been inhabited since the 14th century makes it an important representation of Byzantine life.

The surrounding land under the control of the city, the chora, consists of several square kilometres of ancient but now barren farmland, with remains of wine presses and defensive towers. According to archaeologists, the evidence suggests that the locals were paid to do the farm work instead of being enslaved.

The excavated tombstones hint at burial practices that were different from the Greek ones. Each stone marks the tomb of an individual, instead of the whole family and the decorations include only objects like sashes and weapons, instead of burial statues. Over half of the tombs archaeologists have found have bones of children. Burned remnants suggest that the city was plundered and destroyed.

In 2007, Chersonesus tied for fifth in the Seven Wonders of Ukraine poll.

On February 13, 2009, Ukrainian Defence Minister Yuriy Yekhanurov called on Russia's Black Sea naval fleet to move its automobile depot from the site to another place. The location of the Russian Black Sea naval fleet's automobile depot was one of the obstacles to the inclusion of the reserve on UNESCO's list of world heritage sites.

In 2017, archaeologists discovered on the outskirts of Sevastopol, fragments of an ancient Greek altar with figures of gods.

In 2022, researchers analyzed human skeletal remains from a necropolis in the northern part of Chersonesus, dating to the earliest period of the colony (between the 5th and the 4th century BC). Most of the deceased individuals were positioned in a flexed burial position with their legs crouched and folded up to the chest, while a smaller number were buried in an extended position on their back with arms and legs straight. The researchers found that most individuals were genetically similar to each other, regardless of the burial position. This result challenges the widely held opinion that burial position in the northern Black Sea region was determined by the ancestry of the deceased, with flexed burials belonging to local Taurians, and extended burials belonging to Greek colonists.

=== The 1935 basilica ===
The 1935 basilica is the most famous basilica excavated in Chersonesus. The original name is unknown so "1935" refers to the year it was uncovered. The basilica was probably built in the 6th century on the site of an earlier temple, assumed by historians to be a synagogue, itself replacing a small temple dating from the early days of Christianity. The 1935 basilica is often used as an image representing Chersonesos. Its picture appears on one Ukrainian banknote.

=== Museum contents ===
As well as the archaeological sites, the museum has around 200,000 smaller items from 5 AD to the 15th century, over 5,000 of which are currently exhibited. These include:

- ancient texts, including the Oath of Chersonese citizens (3rd century BC), decrees in honour of Diophantus (2nd century BC)
- a collection of coins
- a mosaic of black and white pebbles and coloured stones
- ancient ceramics
- architectural fragments, including ancient and medieval abacuses, reliefs, the remains of ancient murals

=== Current studies ===
The Institute of Classical Archaeology of the University of Texas at Austin and the local Archaeological Park has investigated the site since 1992. The Ukrainian government has included the site on its tentative World Heritage List. The site, however, is in danger of further urban encroachment and coastal erosion.

In 2013, the ruins of the ancient Greek city and the territory it controlled were listed as a UNESCO World Heritage Site. This World Heritage Site consists of seven locations that encompass the city of Chersonesus and six plots of agricultural land. The site was designated as a World Heritage site under the UNESCO criterion (ii), as an "outstanding physical testimony" to cultural exchange between ancient Greeks, Romans, and Byzantines, and (v), as a well-preserved example of how these ancient societies organized agricultural land. UNESCO considers these areas to show cultural lifestyles and land use of ancient populations that inhabited these areas.

In 2014, the Crimean peninsula was annexed by Russia, but UNESCO has maintained that it will continue to recognize Crimea and its heritage sites as belonging to Ukraine.

=== Problems and controversies ===
The encroachment of modern building in and around the ancient archaeological site, coupled with a lack of funding to prevent such development pressures, has left the site of Chersonesus firmly at risk.

In an October 2010 report titled Saving Our Vanishing Heritage, Global Heritage Fund identified Chersonesus as one of 12 worldwide sites most "On the Verge" of irreparable loss and destruction, citing insufficient management and development pressures as primary causes.

On July 29, 2015, the governor of Sevastopol, Sergey Menyaylo, controversially fired the director of the National Preserve of Tauric Chersonesos, Andrey Kulagin. He then appointed the head priest of the Russian Orthodox Cathedral of Saint Vladimir in Chersonesus, Sergiy Khalyuta, as the new director of the Preserve. This move caused heated protests from the staff of the Preserve, and all 109 members unanimously refused to work under the new director. The conflict attracted significant attention from the media, particularly due to its political connotations, given that Menyaylo had been appointed governor by Russian president Vladimir Putin, shortly after Russia's annexation of Crimea in 2014. The workers claim that the conflict between Menyaylo and Kulagin started on July 11, when Kulagin complained about a road construction project on the territory of the Preserve which had been approved by governor Menyaylo without the permits necessary for construction works in protected areas. Eventually, under pressure from the workers and locals, Father Sergiy stepped down.

On July 23, 2026, Chersonesus and its chora were inscribed on the List of World Heritage in Danger due to damage caused by new construction and archaeological excavations carried out by the Russian authorities.

== See also ==
- List of traditional Greek place names
- Odesa Numismatics Museum having on display coins of Chersonesus
- The bell of Chersonesus
- List of UNESCO World Heritage Sites in Ukraine

== Bibliography and further reading ==
- Anokhin, Vladilen A. The Coinage of Chersonesus: IV century B.C.–XII century A.D. Oxford: British Archaeological Reports, 1980 (paperback, ISBN 0-86054-074-X).
- Carter, Joseph Coleman; Crawford, Melba; Lehman, Paul; Nikolaenko, Galina; Trelogan, Jessica. "The Chora of Chersonesos in Crimea, Ukraine", American Journal of Archaeology, Vol. 104, No. 4. (2000), pp. 707–741.
- Carter, Joseph Coleman; Mack, Glenn Randall. Crimean Chersonesos: City, Chora, Museum, and Environs. Austin, TX: David Brown Book Company, 2003 (paperback, ISBN 0-9708879-2-2).
- Kozelsky, Mara. "Ruins into Relics: The Monument to Saint Vladimir on the Excavations of Chersonesos, 1827–57", The Russian Review, Vol. 63, No. 4. (2004), pp. 655–672.
- Norwich, John Julius. Byzantium: The Early Centuries. New York: Alfred A. Knopf, 1989 (hardcover, ISBN 0-394-53778-5).
- Saprykin, Sergey Yu. Heracleia Pontica and Tauric Chersonesus before Roman domination: (VI–I centuries B.C.). Amsterdam: A.M. Hakkert, 1997 (ISBN 9025611095).
- Stolba, Vladimir F. Greek Countryside in Ancient Crimea: Chersonesean Chora in the Late Classical to Early Hellenistic Period. Aarhus 2014.
- Vus, Oleh. The Defensive Structures of Early Byzantine Cherson: Reconstruction and Development of City Fortification from the Fourth to the Sixth Centuries. 2017. https://www.academia.edu/85590107/The_Defensive_Structures_of_Early_Byzantine_Cherson_Reconstruction_and_Development_of_City_Fortification_from_the_Fourth_to_the_Sixth_Centuries
- Vus, Oleh. The Mobile Group of the Roman Army in Taurica at the end of III—V centuries. 2016. https://www.academia.edu/85638770/The_Mobile_Group_of_the_Roman_Army_in_Taurica_at_the_end_of_III_V_centuries
- Vus, Oleh. Defense doctrine of Byzantium in the Northern Black Sea region: engineering defense of Taurika and the Bosphorus in the late 4th — early 7th centuries. 2010. https://www.academia.edu/85524504/Defense_doctrine_of_Byzantium_in_the_Northern_Black_Sea_region_engineering_defense_of_Taurika_and_the_Bosphorus_in_the_late_4th_early_7th_centuries

== Sources and external links ==
- About Chersonesos - website
- The Chersonese Collection. Iss. 14-22 (2005-2021). (The main periodical scientific edition of the Museum-Preserve "Chersonesos Taurica" in open access)
- High resolution image of antique map of this region
- Greek Inscriptions of Chersonesos, with English translation - IOSPE³ III
