= Chersonesus Cathedral =

Russian Orthodox cathedral on the Crimean Peninsula

- Saint Vladimir's Cathedral; Saint Volodymyr's Cathedral; in Chersonesus
- Владимирский собор в Херсонесе; Володимирський собор в Херсонесі
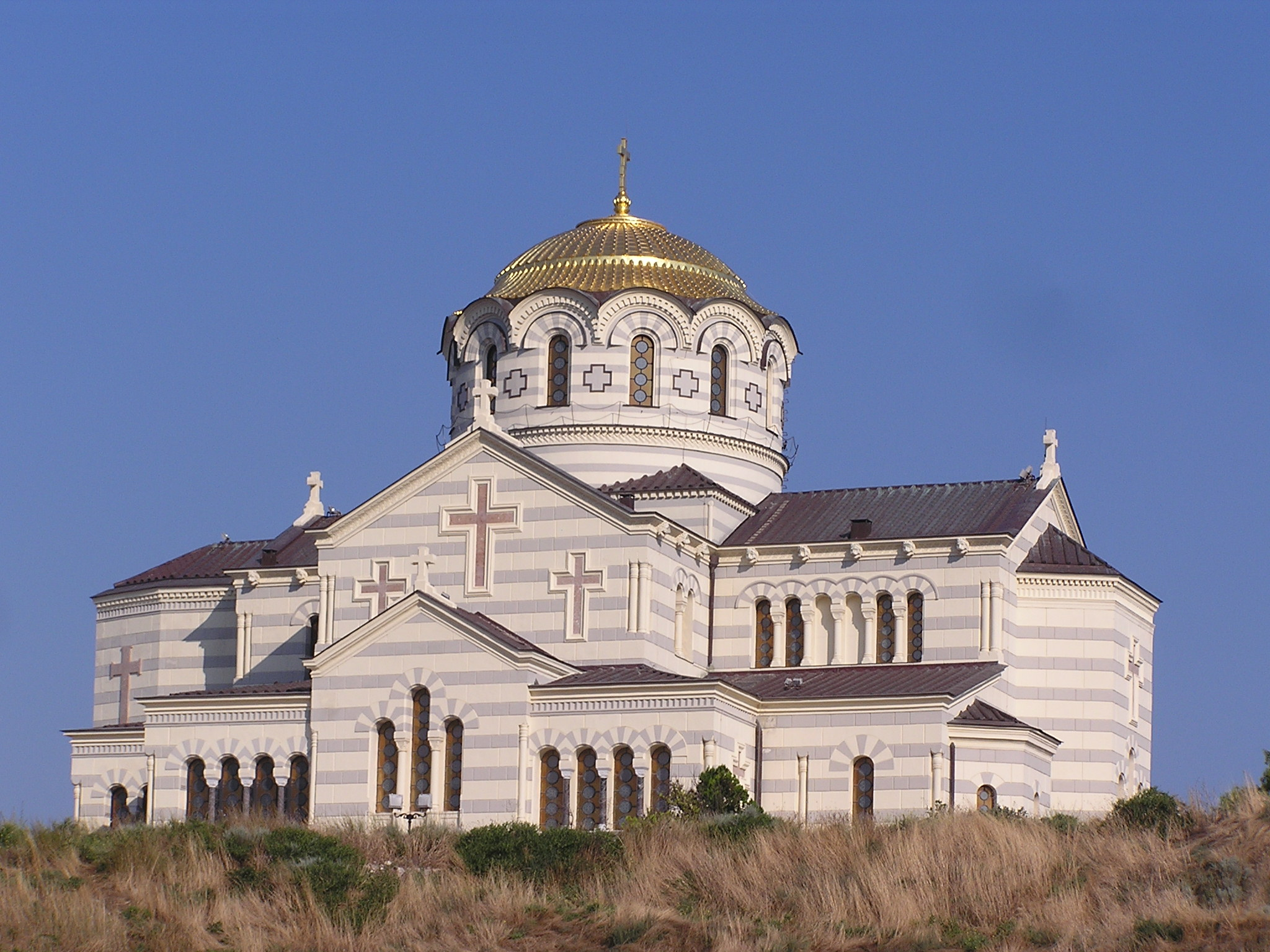
- The cathedral in Chersonese, 2006

- Location in Crimea (disputed territory)
- Chersonesus Cathedral
- 44°36′44″N 33°29′36″E
- Location: Chersonesos Taurica, Sevastopol; Crimea (disputed territory)
- Country: Ukraine
- Denomination: Russian Orthodox

History
- Status: Cathedral
- Dedication: Saint Vladimir's; Saint Volodymyr
- Dedicated: June 13, 1888
- Consecrated: April 3, 2004

Architecture
- Functional status: Active
- Architect: David Grimm
- Architectural type: Cathedral
- Style: Neo-Byzantine
- Years built: c. 1859 – c. 1861 to c. 1874 – c. 1876
- Completed: c. 1876; 150 years ago

Specifications
- Capacity: c. 1,000 worshippers
- Height: 36 m (118 ft)

Immovable Monument of National Significance of Ukraine
- Official name: Володимирський собор в Херсонесі (in Ukrainian)
- Reference no.: 270027

The Chersonesus Cathedral, officially Saint Vladimir's Cathedral in Chersonesus (Russian: Владимирский собор в Херсонесе) or Saint Volodymyr's Cathedral in Chersonesus (Ukrainian: Володимирський собор в Херсонесі), is a Russian Orthodox cathedral on the site of Chersonesos Taurica on the outskirts of Sevastopol, on the disputed territory of the Crimean Peninsula, in Ukraine. The cathedral is dedicated to Saint Vladimir, as the presumed place of his baptism.

== History ==
According to legend and historic facts, the baptism of Vladimir the Great took place in 988 in the Chersonese (or, as it was called by the Rus' people, Korsun), now – Chersonesos Taurica, a national reserve near Sevastopol. In The Tale of Bygone Years by the monk Nestor, the city's conciliar church was mentioned "in the middle of the city, where the inhabitants gather to trade", which, as supposed, could be the probable place of this event crucial for the whole of Rus'.

The idea to immortalize the place of the Baptism of the Holy Prince Vladimir Equal-to-the-Apostles was first represented in 1825 by the Black Sea Fleet Chief, Vice-Admiral Alexey Greig. On his initiative excavations under the direction of K. Kruse were conducted in Chersonesos Taurica in 1827. As a result, the remains of the ancient Christian churches, including a cruciform basilica, were found at the centre of the market square. In the 1830s the historians Frédéric Dubois de Montpéreux and N. Murzakevich made the conjecture that Vladimir the Great was baptized in this basilica. After that, all doubts about the place of the future church were dispelled. In 1850, on the initiative of Innocent, archbishop of Tauric Chersonese, a cenobium was founded at the site, the Monastery of the Holy Prince Vladimir Equal-to-the-Apostles. On August 23, 1850, the grand laying of the foundation stone of the church in honor of Saint Vladimir took place.

== Building ==
The Neo-Byzantine cathedral was designed by academician David Grimm. The cathedral was built between c. 1859 – c. 1861 to c. 1874 – c. 1876, with the assistance of engineer M. Arnold. It was one of the biggest cathedrals in the Russian Empire and could accommodate up to a thousand people. It was 36 metres (118 ft) high, covered 1,726 square metres (18,580 sq ft), and its single dome was 10.5 metres (34 ft) in diameter.

The building consists of a lower (winter) and upper (summer) church.

The decoration of the church began on the eve of the 900th anniversary of the Baptism of Rus. It was not completed in time for this significant date, so on June 13, 1888, on the Memorial Day of Grand Prince St. Vladimir, only the lower church, dedicated to the Birth of Mary, was consecrated. That year the carved-wood iconostasis was placed in the church and the interior work on the upper church under the direction of architect Nikolay Chagin began. The painting and icons for the central iconostasis of the cathedral were made by academician Alexei Korzukhin. Furthermore, in the interior of the cathedral works executed in the 1850s by academician T. Neff, painter F. Riss, and icons made by I. Maikov and E. Sorokin were also used. Works in marble, such as the iconostasis of the upper church, the mosaic floor of the cathedral, and the marble balustrade along the soleas, were carried out by Italian masters J. Seppi and the Baskarini brothers. The consecration of the cathedral took place on October 17, 1891, though the final decorative design was completed only in 1894.

As far back as 1859, the marble reliquary in the form of a Gospel with relics of Grand Prince St. Vladimir was passed from the Small Church of the Winter Palace in St. Petersburg to Chersonese. After the building of St. Vladimir Cathedral, his relics were placed in the lower church near the ruins of the ancient basilica. The list from the miracle-working Korsun icon of the Mother of God, which, according to legend, was brought from Chersonese by Vladimir the Great, is situated at the altar of the upper church. Altogether, the relics of 115 saints were translated to the cathedral.

=== Reconstruction ===
During World War II the cathedral was destroyed. Work on its restoration began in the late 1990s. The project of reconstruction was carried out by the Kyiv Institute “UkrProjectRestoration” under the direction of architect E. Osadchiy. From 2002 Vladimir Cathedral was painted by artists from St. Petersburg, Kyiv and the Crimea, who recreated the lost paintings of academician A. Korzuhin. The following monumental compositions can be seen on the walls of the cathedral: “The Holy Spirit” (by L. Steblovska, E. Revenko), “The Baptism of Christ” (by A. Dmitrenko), “The Transfiguration of Christ” (by L. Dmitrenko, N. Dmitrenko), and “The Lord's Last Supper” (by A. Pigarev, K. Popovskiy). The icons for the marble iconostasis of the Upper Church were painted by the young artists A. Dmitrenko and N. Dmitrenko.

The consecration of the high altar of Vladimir Cathedral in Chersonese took place on April 3, 2004, and a week later the Easter liturgy was celebrated.

== Gallery ==
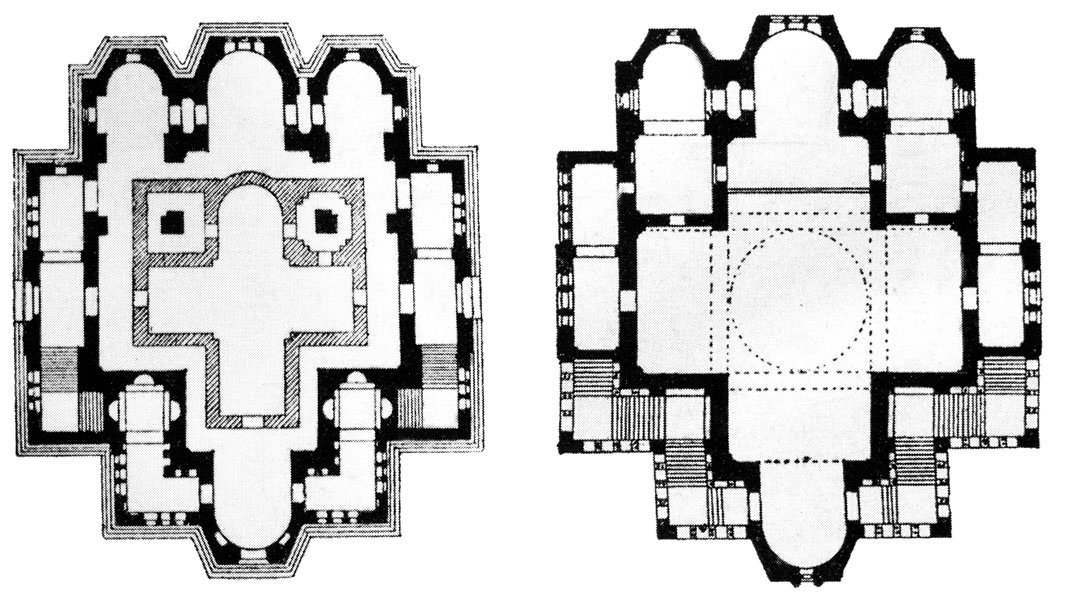
Grimm's 1859 plans: lower (winter) and upper (summer) church

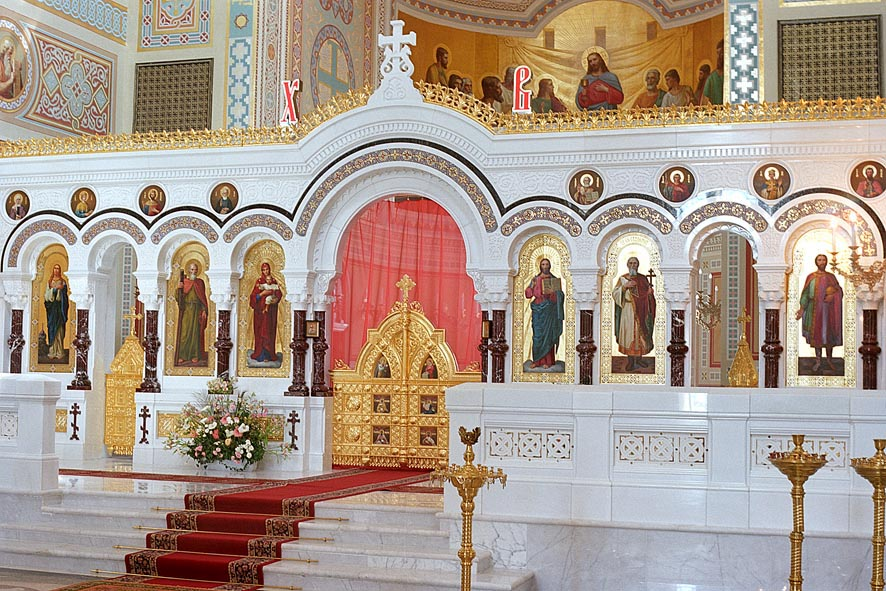
Iconostasis in front of the sanctuary

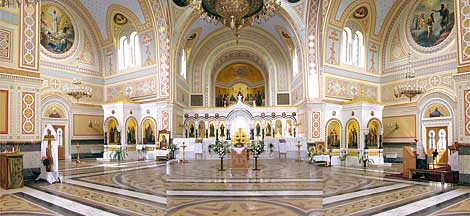
Interior, facing towards the iconostasis (composite photo)

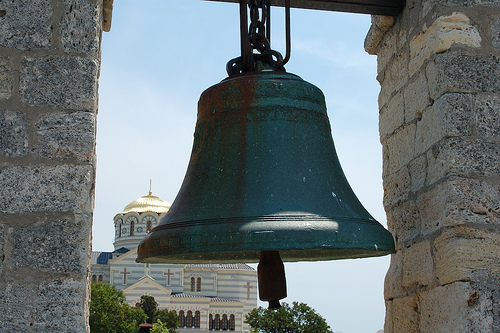
The Bell of Chersonesos with the cathedral in the background

== See also ==
- St. Vladimir's Cathedral, Sevastopol
- Neo-Byzantine architecture in the Russian Empire
