= Babaghuq =

Babaghuq was the title of an elected chieftain who was involved in the governance of a Khazar town, either in place of or in conjunction with a tudun or governor. The name means "father of the city".

Babaghuqs are recorded as being involved in city politics in Cherson and Tamatarkha.
