= Melba Crawford =

American civil engineer and academic

- Education: University of Illinois at Urbana–Champaign, BSCE (1970); University of Illinois at Urbana–Champaign, MSCE (1973); Ohio State University, Ph.D. (1981)
- Scientific career
- Fields: Geomatics Engineering
- Workplaces: Purdue University

Melba M. Crawford is the Associate Dean of Engineering for Research and a professor of agronomy, Civil Engineering, and Electrical & Computer Engineering at Purdue University. As the Nancy Uridil and Francis Bossu Professor in Civil Engineering, her specialty is Geomatics Engineering.

Crawford also serves as professor and chair of Excellence in Earth Observation.

== Education ==
- Ph.D., Ohio State University, systems engineering 1981
- MSCE, University of Illinois at Urbana–Champaign, civil engineering 1973
- BSCE, University of Illinois, civil engineering 1970,

== Career ==
As a professor at the University of Texas, Austin, Crawford founded an "interdisciplinary research and applications development program in space-based and airborne remote sensing.” Besides being an Associate Dean at Purdue, Crawford holds the Purdue Chair of Excellence in Earth Observation and is the Director of the Laboratory for Applications of Remote Sensing. Crawford has worked with NASA, the US Department of State, and was the 2013–2014 President of the IEEE Geoscience and Remote Sensing Society and an Associate Editor of IEEE Transactions on Geoscience and Remote Sensing.
