= Roman Catholic Diocese of Chersonesus =

Roman Catholic Diocese of Chersonesus may refer to the following ecclesiastical jurisdictions with sees (once) called Chersonesus :

- the Latin Roman Catholic Archdiocese of Chersonesus in Zechia, on the Crimea, now titular
- the Latin Roman Catholic Diocese of Chersonesus in Creta (formerly Chiron), Greece, now titular
- the Latin Episcopal See of Chersonesus in Europa, in the Roman Heraclea province, now Turkey, now titular
