= Neo-Byzantine architecture in the Russian Empire =

Revivalist architectural style

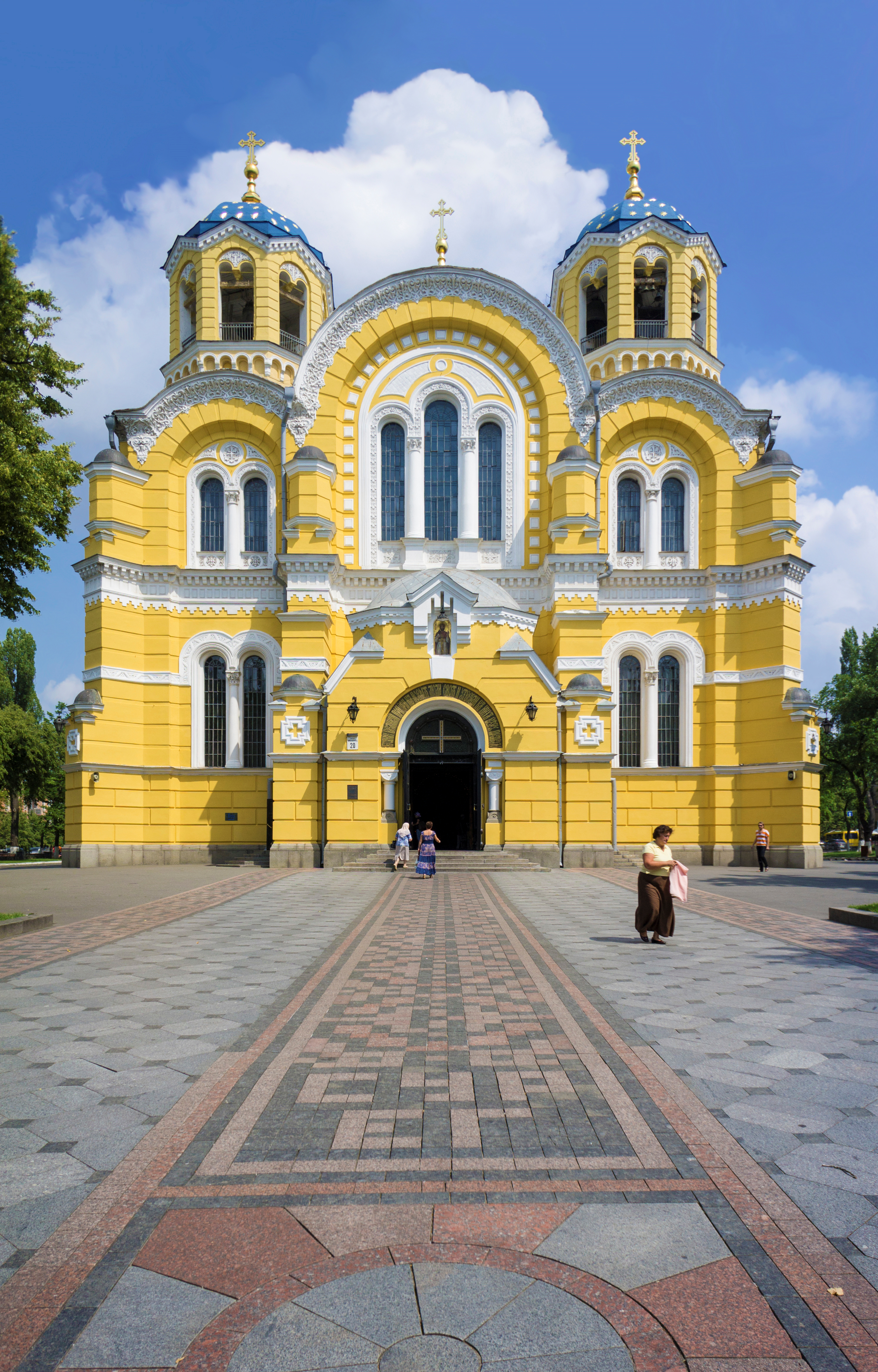
Cathedral of Saint Vladimir in Kyiv was the first Neo-Byzantine design approved for construction in the Russian Empire (1852). It was not the first to be completed though, since construction started in 1859 and continued until 1889.

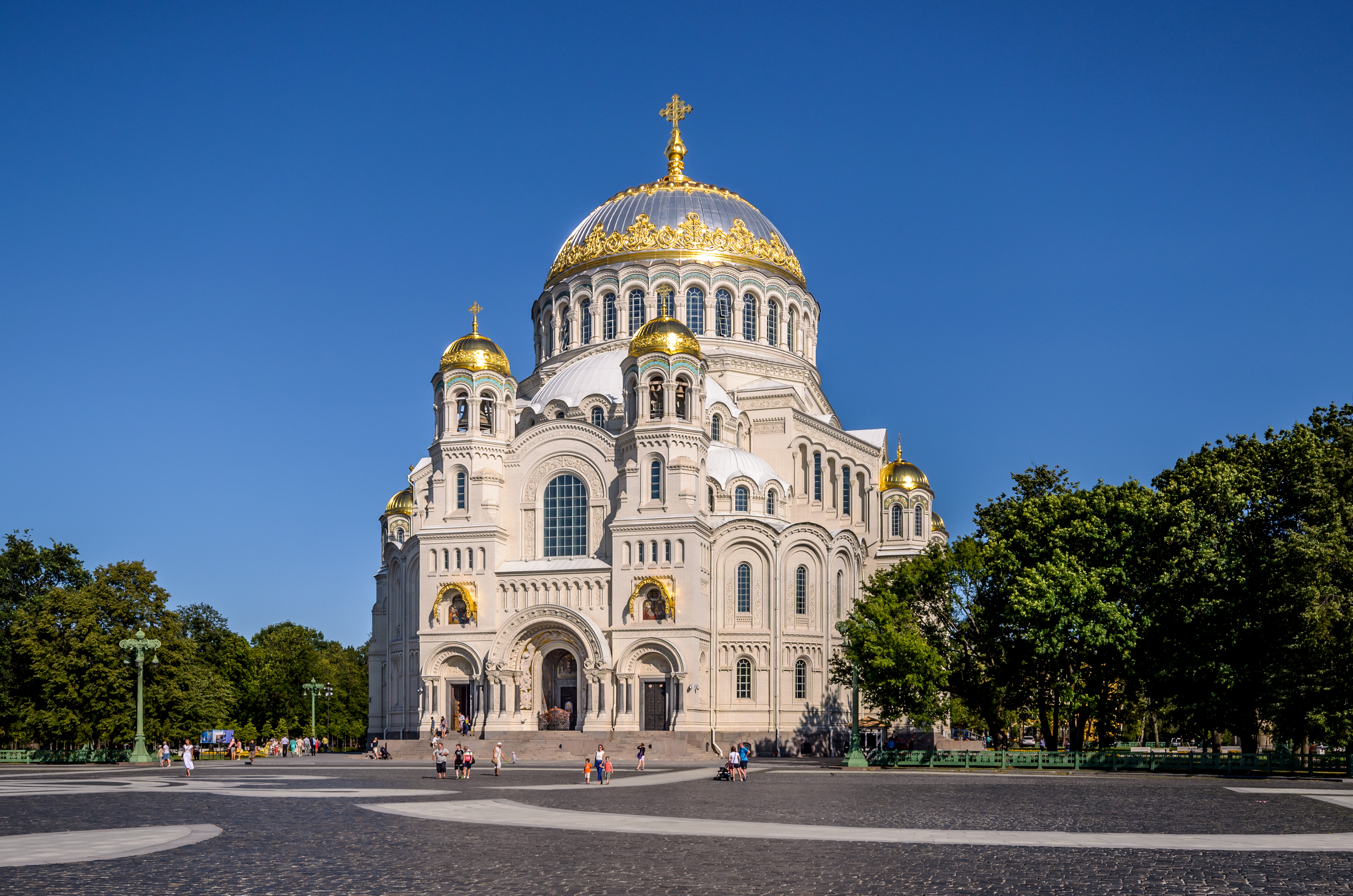
Naval Cathedral, Kronstadt

Russian-Byzantine architecture (Russo-Byzantine architecture; Russian: русско-византийский стиль) is a revivalist direction in Russian architecture and decorative and applied arts, based on the interpretation of the forms of Byzantine and Old Russian architecture. As part of eclecticism, the style could be combined with other styles.

The style originated in the Russian Empire in the first half of the 19th century. The founder of this style is considered to be Konstantin Thon. Formed in the early 1830s as an entire direction, the Russian-Byzantine style was inextricably linked with the concept of nationality, expressing the idea of cultural self-sufficiency of Russia, as well as its political and religious continuity in relation to Byzantine Empire. In a narrow sense, the Russian-Byzantine style referred as the style of Konstantin Thon, common in the second third of the 19th century, and post Thon style, that began in the 1850s and more similar to the Byzantine architecture, called the Neo-Byzantine style.

Russian-Byzantine style became an officially endorsed preferred architectural style for church construction during the reign of Alexander II of Russia (1855–1881). Although Alexander III changed state preferences in favor of late Russian Revival, Neo-Byzantine architecture flourished during his reign (1881–1894) and continued to be used until the outbreak of World War I. Émigré architects who settled in the Balkans and in Harbin after the Russian Revolution worked on Neo-Byzantine designs there until World War II.

Initially, Byzantine architecture buildings were concentrated in Saint Petersburg and the Crimea, with two isolated projects launched in Kiev and Tbilisi. In the 1880s, Byzantine designs became the preferred choice for Orthodox expansion on the frontiers of the Empire – Congress Poland, Lithuania, Bessarabia, Central Asia, North Caucasus, the Lower Volga and the Cossack Hosts; in the 1890s, they spread from the Urals region into Siberia along the emerging Trans-Siberian Railway. State-sponsored Byzantine churches were also built in Jerusalem, Harbin, Sofia and on the French Riviera. Non-religious construction in Byzantine style was uncommon; most extant examples were built as hospitals and almshouses during the reign of Nicholas II.

== History ==
=== Background ===
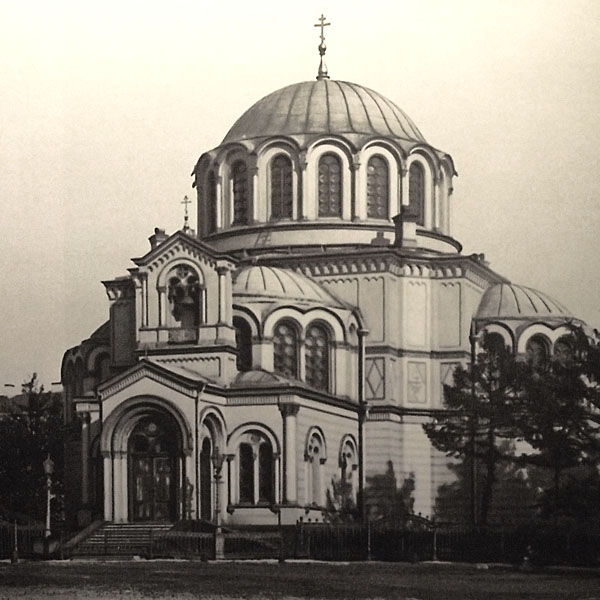
Church of Dmitry Solunsky in Saint Petersburg (1861–1866) by Roman Kuzmin – an earliest example of the style

The last decade of Alexander I's rule was marked by state enforcement of the Empire style as the only architectural style for religious, public and private construction. This monopoly of a single style was lifted in the early 1830s; as Nicholas I promoted Konstantin Thon's eclectic church designs, architects (Mikhail Bykovsky) and art circles in general (Nikolai Gogol) called for general liberalization of building permit procedures, insisting on the architect's freedom to choose a style best fitting the building's functions and the client's preferences. As a result, by the end of the 1840s Russian civil architecture diversified into various revival styles (Gothic Revival by Bykovsky, Neo-Renaissance by Thon) while new church projects leaned towards Thon's "Album of model designs" or neoclassicism.

The reign of Nicholas I was marked by persistent expansion of Russia – either in the form of colonization of territories acquired earlier in the West and South (partitions of Poland–Lithuania, Novorossiya, the Crimea, the Caucasus) or in the form of increasing intervention in the Eastern Question. Nicholas shared his predecessors' aspirations for the Bosporus and the Dardanelles, and engaged in a dispute with France for control over Holy Land shrines, which provoked the Crimean War. The eastern policies of the state aroused public interest and sponsored academic studies in Byzantine history and culture. The expansion of Russian Orthodoxy into the new territories created new large-scale construction projects that needed to be integrated into local environments.

The Imperial Academy of Arts, closely supervised by Nicholas, supported studies of the Orient and specifically Byzantium, but Nicholas himself despised Byzantine architecture. Ivan Strom, one of the architects of the cathedral of Saint Vladimir in Kyiv, recalled Nicholas saying "I cannot stand this style, yet, unlike others, I allow it" (Russian: "Терпеть не могу этого стиля но, не в пример прочим разрешаю"). Royal approval was made possible by the academic studies of the architecture of Kievan Rus in the 1830s–1840s that, for the first time, attempted to reconstruct the initial shape of Kievan cathedrals and established them as the missing link between Byzantium and the architecture of Veliky Novgorod.

The cathedral of Saint Vladimir became the first neo-Byzantine project approved by the Emperor (1852). The Crimean War, lack of funds (the cathedral was financed through private donations) and severe engineering errors delayed its completion until the 1880s. The first neo-Byzantine projects to be completed appeared after the death of Nicholas: the interiors of the Saint Sergius of Radonezh church in the Strelna Monastery, designed by Alexey Gornostaev (1859), and a small chapel of Mariinsky Palace designed by Grigory Gagarin (1860).

=== Royal endorsement ===
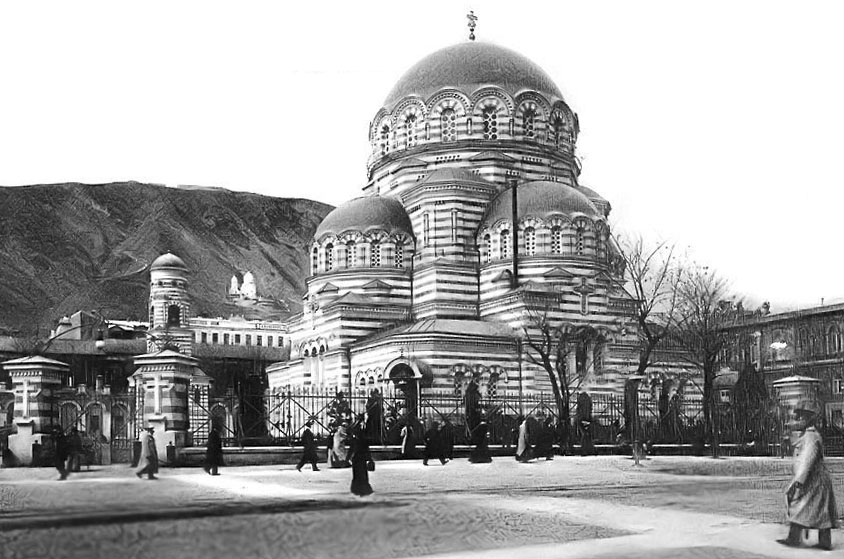
Composition of Tbilisi cathedral became de facto industry standard well before it was completed. Note the small, fully detached belltower in the back yard.

Prince Grigory Gagarin, who had served in Constantinople and the Caucasus as a diplomat, became the most influential supporter of the Byzantine style – through his published studies of vernacular Caucasian and Greek heritage as well as through his service to empress Maria Alexandrovna and grand duchess Maria Nikolayevna (Alexander II's sister and president of the Imperial Academy of Arts). As early as 1856, empress Maria Alexandrovna expressed her will to see new churches executed in Byzantine style.

The first of these churches was built in 1861–1866 on the Greek Square of Saint Petersburg. Architect Roman Kuzmin (1811–1867) loosely followed the canon of the Hagia Sophia – a flattened main dome blended into a cylindrical arcade resting on a cubical main structure. Kuzmin, however, added a novel feature – instead of two apses, typical of the Byzantine prototypes, he used four. This cross-shaped layout was refined in 1865 by David Grimm, who extended Kuzmin's flattened structure vertically. Although Grimm's design remained on paper for over 30 years, its basic composition became nearly universal in Russian construction practice.

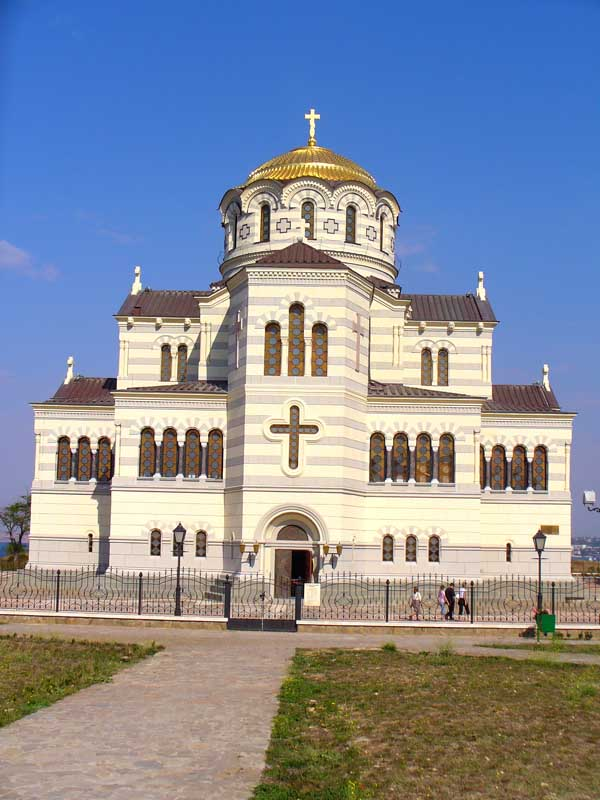
Saint Vladimir Cathedral in Chersonesos by David Grimm

Another trend was launched by David Grimm's design of the Saint Vladimir Cathedral in Chersonesus (1858–1879). The church, built on the ruins of an ancient Greek cathedral, was sponsored by Alexander II. Grimm, also a historian of Caucasian heritage, was picked by Maria Alexandrovna, most likely upon advice by Gagarin and Maria Nikolaevna. His cross-shaped structure used a complex succession of staggered simple shapes. Grimm restricted the use of curvilinear surfaces to the main dome only; apses and their roofing were polygonal – in line with Georgian and Armenian prototypes. This "linear" variety of Byzantine architecture remained uncommon in the 19th century but surged in popularity in the reign of Nicholas II.

Despite the support of the royal family, the reign of Alexander II did not produce many examples of the style: the economy, crippled by the Crimean War and further stressed by Alexander's reforms, was too weak to support mass construction. Once started, projects were delayed for decades. For example, Aleksei Avdeyev's draft of the Sevastopol Cathedral was approved in 1862, but actual work started only in 1873. The foundations, built before the war, were already in place yet construction dragged on slowly until 1888, literally consuming the architect's life. David Grimm's Tbilisi cathedral, designed in 1865, was started in 1871 and soon abandoned; construction resumed in 1889 and was completed in 1897. Grimm died one year later.

=== Proliferation ===
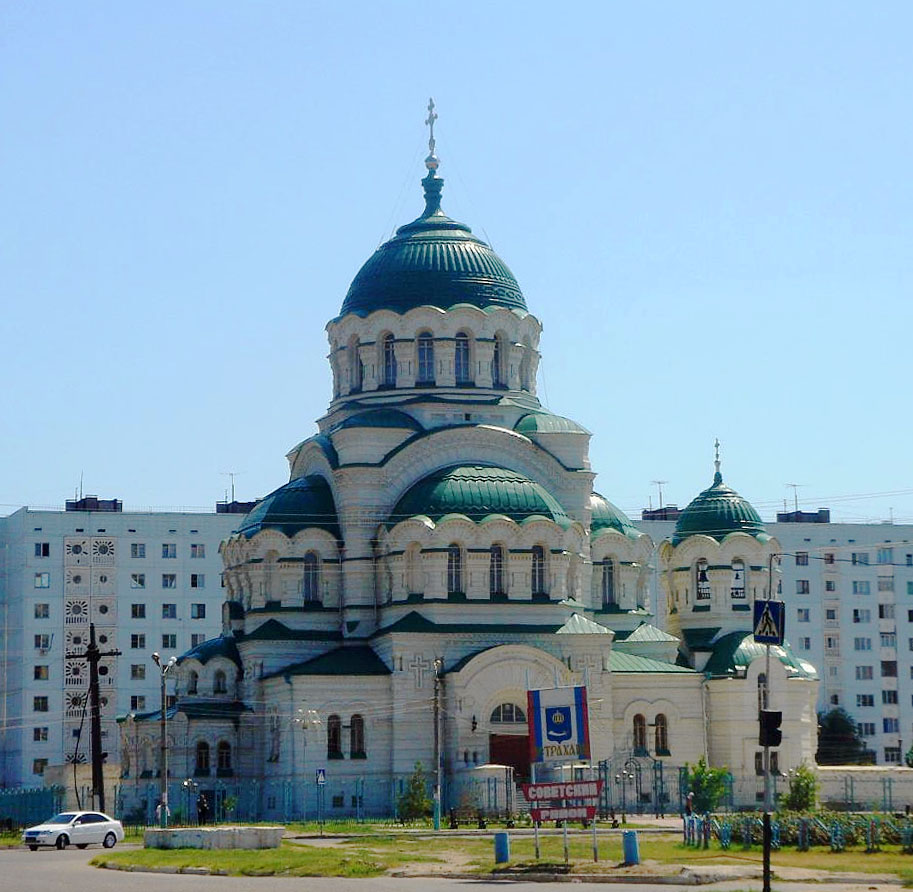
In 1888 Vasily Kosyakov found the ultimate proportion of a single-dome design. Blueprints of his Astrakhan church were copied in Kamianets-Podilskyi before the original was completed (1895–1904).

Church construction and economy in general rebounded in the reign of Alexander III (1881–1894). In thirteen and a half years, the properties of the Russian Orthodox church increased by more than 5,000 places of worship; by 1894 there were 47,419 temples including 695 major cathedrals. Most of the new temples, however, belonged to the late 19th century variant of Russian Revival that became the official style of Alexander III. The turn in state preferences was signalled in 1881–1882 by two architectural contests for the design of the Church of the Savior on Blood in Saint Petersburg. Both contests were dominated by Neo-Byzantine designs, yet Alexander dismissed them all and eventually awarded the project to Alfred Parland, setting the stylistic preference of the next decade. Highly publicized features of Savior on the Blood – a central tented roof, excessive ornaments in red brickwork and a clear reference to Moscow and Yaroslavl relics of the 17th century – were instantly copied in smaller church buildings.

Nearly all of the 5,000 churches attributed to Alexander III were financed through public donations. 100% state financing was reserved for a few palace churches directly catering to the royal family. The "military" churches built in military and naval bases were co-financed by the state, the officers, and through popular subscription among civilians. For example, the Byzantine church of the 13th infantry regiment in Manglisi (Georgia), designed to accommodate 900 worshipers, cost 32,360 roubles, of which only 10,000 were provided by the state treasury.

Preference for Russian Revival did not mean aversion to Byzantine architecture. Alexander displayed a clear aversion to 18th century baroque and neoclassicism that he despised as symbols of Petrine absolutism; Byzantine architecture was an acceptable "middle road". Byzantine-style architects of the previous reign formed a numerous school with loyal clients, including senior clergy. Paradoxically, the Byzantine school was concentrated in the Institute of Civil Engineers which also provided a department chair to Nikolay Sultanov, informal leader of Russian Revival and an advisor to Alexander III. Sultanov's graduate, Vasily Kosyakov, made himself famous by the Byzantine churches in Saint Petersburg (1888–1898) and Astrakhan (designed in 1888, built in 1895–1904), but was just as successful in Russian Revival projects (Libava Naval Cathedral, 1900–1903). Two schools coexisted in a normal working atmosphere, at least in Saint Petersburg.

Neo-Byzantine architecture of Alexander III's reign dominated in three geographical niches. It was the style of choice for Orthodox clergy and the military governors in Congress Poland and Lithuania (cathedrals in Kaunas, Kielce, Łódź, Vilnius); in the southern regions (Kharkov, Novocherkassk, Rostov-na-Donu, Samara, Saratov and numerous settlements of Cossack Hosts); and in the Urals (Perm to Orenburg); in 1891 the list expanded with Siberian towns along the emerging Trans-Siberian Railway.

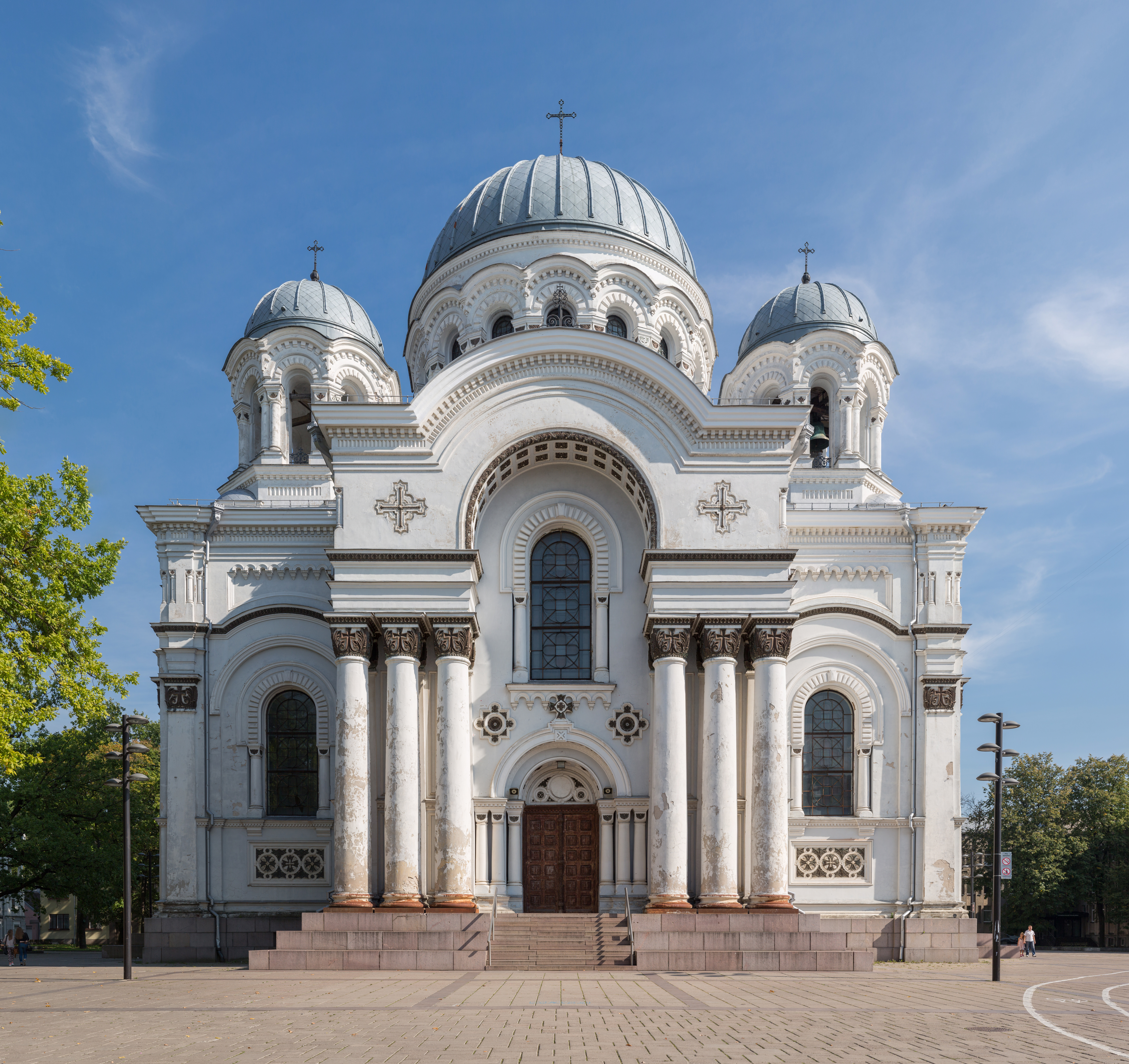
St. Michael the Archangel Church in Kaunas was built in Roman-Byzantine style

Western and southern provinces engaged in large Byzantine projects designed by alumni of the Institute of Civil Engineers. Provincial architecture was frequently dominated by a single local architect (Alexander Bernardazzi in Bessarabia, Alexander Yaschenko in southern Russia, Alexander Turchevich in Perm), which explains regional "clusters" of apparently similar churches. Architects usually followed the standard established by Kuzmin and Grimm, or the classical five-dome layout, with some notable exceptions. Kharkov Cathedral (1888–1901) was designed for 4,000 worshipers and equalled in height Ivan the Great Belltower in the Kremlin. The Cathedral of the Kovno fortress (1891–1895, 2,000 worshipers), contrary to Byzantine canon, was adorned by Corinthian columns, giving rise to the "Roman–Byzantine" style.

Alexander's indifference to Byzantine architecture actually increased its appeal to private clients: the style was not reserved for the Church anymore. Elements of Byzantine art (rows of arches, two-tone striped masonry) were a common decoration of brick style factories and apartment buildings. They easily blended with Romanesque or Moorish revival traditions, as in the Tbilisi Opera, designed by Victor Schroeter. Byzantine-Russian eclecticism became the preferred choice for municipal and private almshouses in Moscow. The trend was started by Alexander Ober's church of the Rukavishnikov almshouse (1879) and culminated in the extant Boyev almshouse in Sokolniki (Alexander Ober, 1890s). Moscow clergy, on the contrary, did not commission a single Byzantine church between 1876 (church of Kazan Icon at Kaluga Gates) and 1898 (Epiphany cathedral in Dorogomilovo).

=== Reign of Nicholas II ===
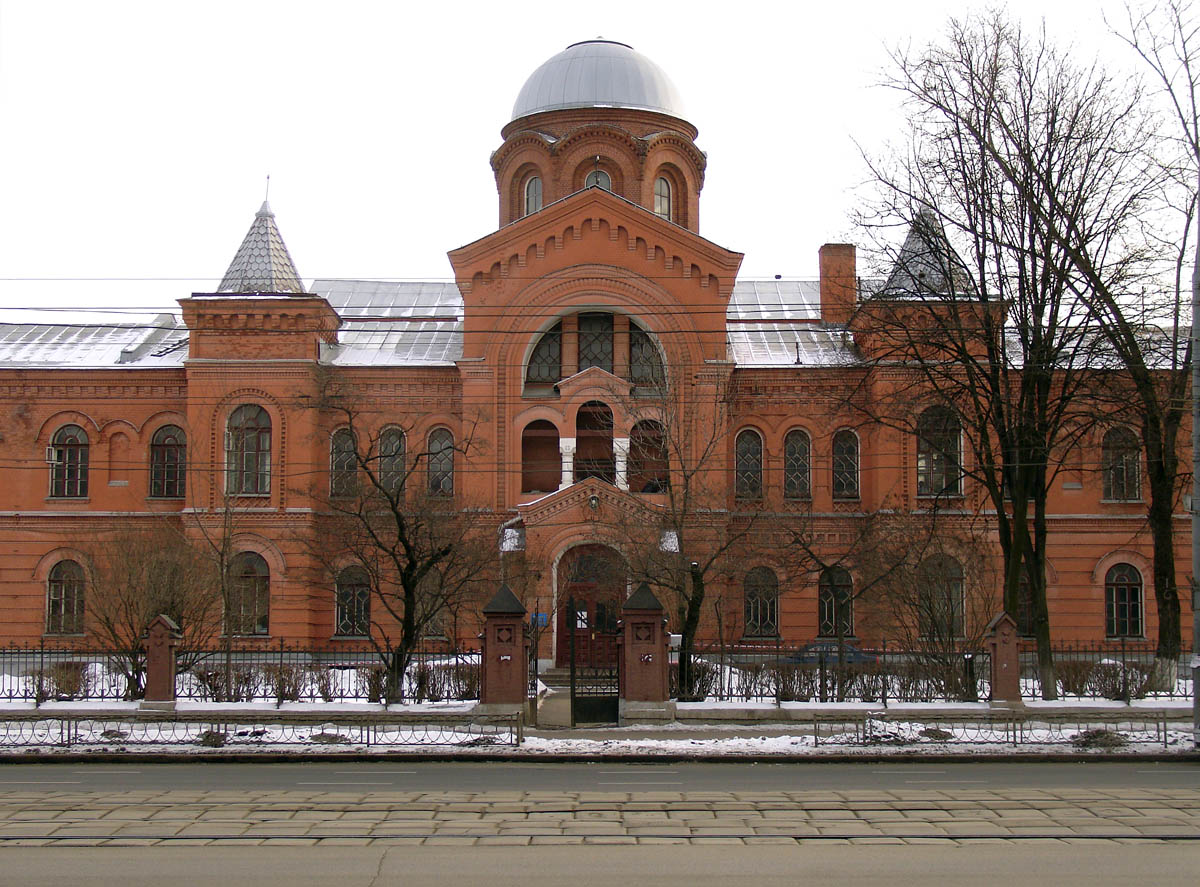
Boyev almshouse in Sokolniki, Moscow, completed shortly after the ascension of Nicholas II. The tented roofs of the side towers are borrowed from contemporary Russian Revival toolset.

The personal tastes of the last emperor were mosaic: he promoted 17th-century Russian art in interior design and costume, yet displayed aversion to Russian Revival architecture. Nicholas or his Ministry of the Court did not demonstrate a lasting preference for any style; his last private commission, the Lower dacha in Peterhof, was a Byzantine design following a string of neoclassical revival buildings. State-funded construction was largely decentralised and managed by individual statesmen with their own agendas. For a short period preceding the disastrous Russo-Japanese War, Byzantine style apparently became the choice of state, at least of the Imperial Navy which sponsored high-profile construction projects at metropolitan and overseas bases.

The architecture of the last twenty years of the Russian Empire was marked by a rapid succession of Art Nouveau and neoclassical revival. These styles dominated the private construction market but failed to get a firm niche in official Orthodox Church projects. However, Art Nouveau ideas slowly infiltrated traditional Byzantine architecture. Its influence was obvious in the furnishings of traditional Byzantine churches (Naval Cathedral in Kronstadt). Members of Art Nouveau (Fyodor Schechtel, Sergey Solovyov) and neoclassical (Vladimir Adamovich) schools created their own versions of the Byzantine style – either highly decorative (Schechtel's church in Ivanovo) or, on the contrary, "streamlined" (Solovyov's church in Kuntsevo). Eventually, the "northern" variety of Art Nouveau (Ilya Bondarenko) became the style of the legalized Old Believers.

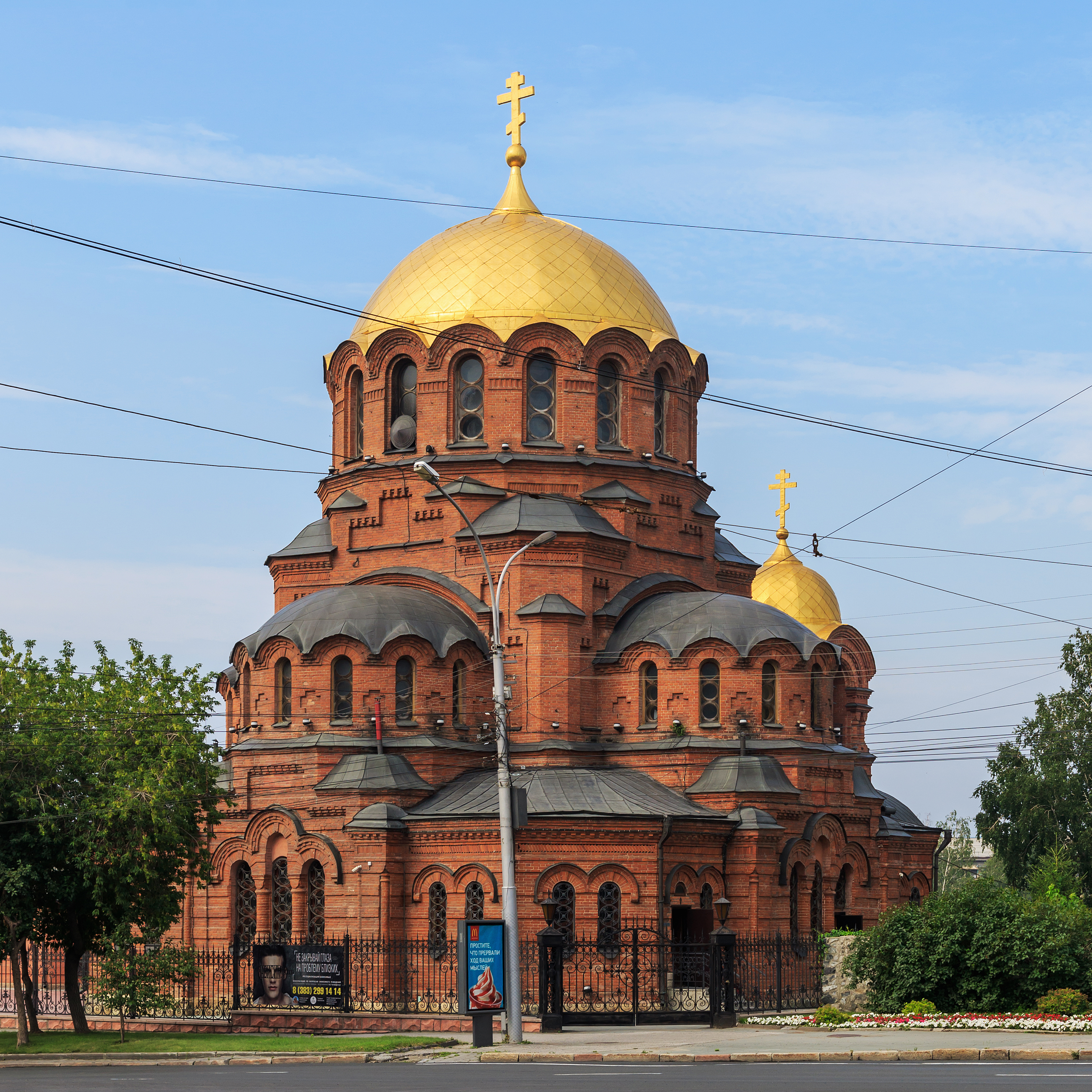
Alexander Nevsky Cathedral in Novosibirsk

Fragmentation of style in small-scale projects developed in parallel to four very large, conservatively styled Neo-Byzantine cathedrals: the Naval Cathedral in Kronstadt, cathedrals in Tsaritsyn, Poti (present-day Georgia) and Sofia (Bulgaria). Three of them (Kronstadt, Poti, Sofia) were a clear homage to the Hagia Sophia; their authors apparently dismissed the "golden rule" of single-dome designs established in the previous decades. Exact reasons for this change in style are unknown; in case of the Kronstadt cathedral it can be traced to direct intervention by Admiral Makarov.

Poti cathedral, designed by Alexander Zelenko and Robert Marfeld, was unusual in being the first major church project built in reinforced concrete. It was structurally completed in a single construction season (1906–1907); the whole project took less than two years (November 1905 – July 1907), an absolute record for the period. Kronstadt cathedral, also employing concrete, was structurally complete in four construction seasons (1903–1907) due to delays caused by the Russian Revolution of 1905. Other projects did not fare as well; Dorogomilovo cathedral in Moscow (1898–1910), designed to be the city's second largest, was plagued by money shortages and in the end consecrated in an incomplete, stripped-down form.

=== Emigration ===
The Russian branch of Byzantine architecture was terminated by the revolution of 1917 but found an unexpected afterlife in Yugoslavia through the personal support of King Alexander Karadjordjevic. Alexander sponsored Byzantine church projects by emigre architects in Belgrade, Lazarevac, Požega and other towns. Serbia and Montenegro became a new home to over a thousand construction workers and professionals from Russia. Russian immigration to Yugoslavia, estimated at 40–70 thousands, was welcomed by the government as a quick replacement of professionals killed in World War I. Vasily Androsov alone is credited with 50 Byzantine churches built in the interwar period. Russian painters created the interiors of the Monastery of Presentation and the historical Ružica Church.

The Russian diaspora in Harbin produced two interwar Byzantine cathedrals. The larger Cathedral of Annunciation, designed and built by Boris Tustanovsky in 1930–1941, was destroyed during the Cultural Revolution. It was notable as one of the few large Russian Orthodox basilicas. A smaller, still extant Church of Protection, a single-dome structure designed in 1905 by Yury Zhdanov, was built in a single season in 1922. It has been Harbin's sole Orthodox place of worship since 1984.

== Style defined ==
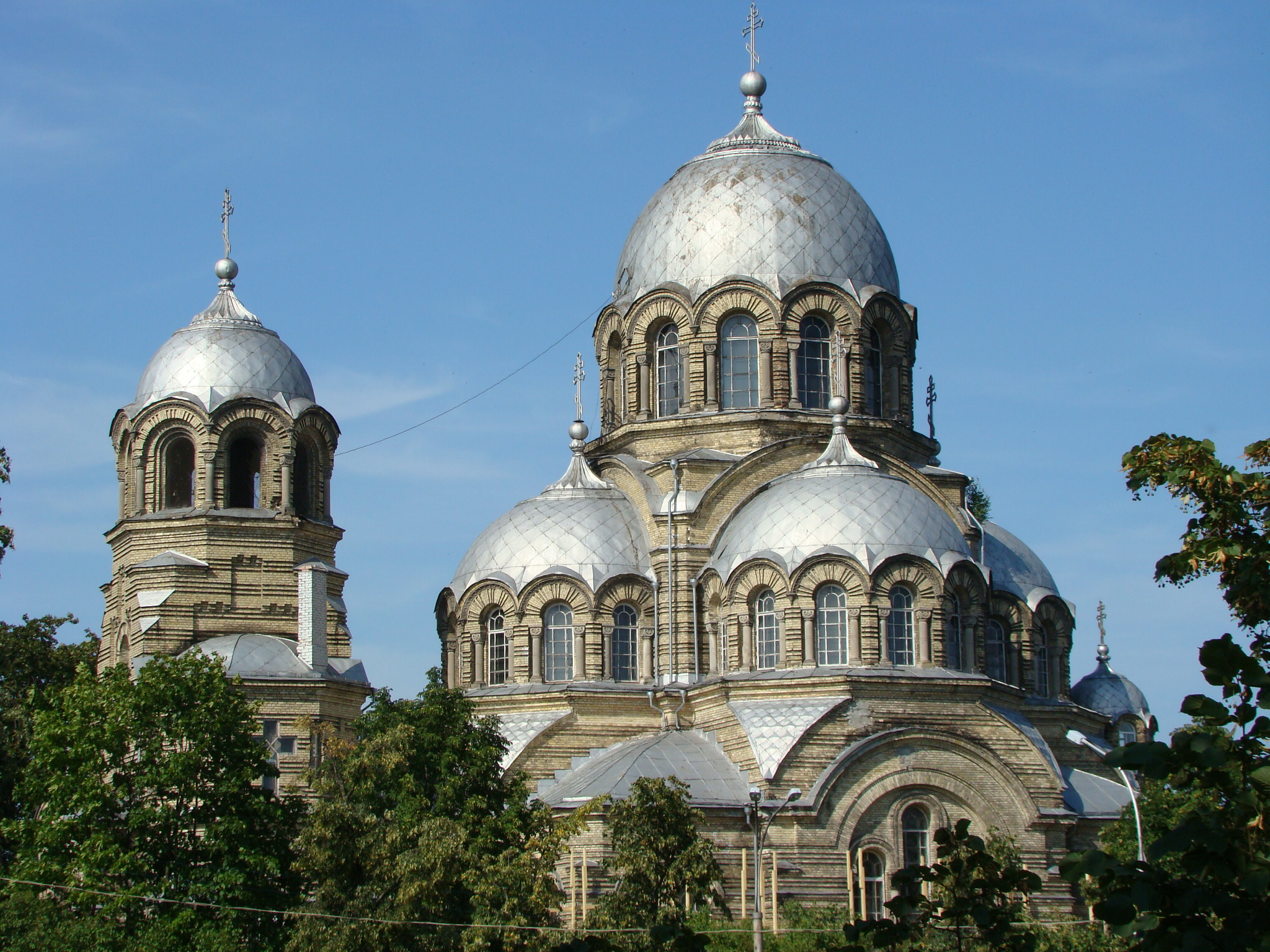
The church of the Theotokos Orans (Our Lady of the Sign) in Vilnius (1899–1903) demonstrates typical features of developed Russian-Byzantine architecture: exposed two-tone, striped, masonry; four symmetrical apses tightly fused into the main dome, creating a tall triangular outline; arcades blending into the domes; and a relatively small belltower, clearly subordinate to the main dome.

=== Details ===
Byzantine revival architecture, unlike contemporary revival styles, was easily identifiable by a rigid set of decorative tools. Some examples of the style deviated into Caucasian, neoclassical and Romanesque, yet all followed the basic dome and arcade design rule of medieval Constantinople:

- Hemispherical domes. Byzantine churches were always crowned with simple hemispherical domes. Sometimes, as in the Theotokos Orans (Our Lady of the Sign) church in Vilnius, they featured a small curvilinear pointed top at the base of a cross, otherwise the cross was mounted directly at the flattened apex of the dome. Onion domes and tented roofs of vernacular Russian architecture were ruled out; they remained exclusive features of Russian Revival architecture sponsored by Alexander III, and were considerably heavier and more expensive than domes of the same diameter.
- Blending of arches and domes. The most visible feature of Byzantine churches is the absence of a formal cornice between the dome and its support. Instead, the supporting arcade blends directly into dome roof; tin roofing flows smoothly around the arches. Arches were designed for maximum insolation via wide window openings. A few designs (Sevastopol Cathedral, 1862–1888, Livadia church, 1872–1876) also had wooden window shutters with circular cutouts, as used in medieval Byzantium. In the 20th century this pattern was reproduced in stone (Kuntsevo church, 1911), actually reducing insolation.
- Exposed masonry. The Neoclassical canon enforced by Alexander I required masonry surfaces to be finished in flush stucco. Byzantine and Russian revival architects radically departed from this rule; instead, they relied on exposing exterior brickwork. While exposed brickwork dominated the scene, it was not universal; exterior stucco remained in use, especially in the first decade of Alexander II's reign.
- Two-tone, striped masonry. Russian architects borrowed the Byzantine tradition of adorning flat wall surfaces with horizontal striped patterns. Usually, wide bands of dark red base brickwork were interleaved with narrow stripes of yellow of grey brick, slightly set back into the wall. Reverse (dark red stripes over grey background) was rare, usually associated with Georgian variety of churches built in Nicholas II period. The importance of colour pattern increased with building size: it was nearly universal in large cathedrals but unnecessary in small parish churches.

=== Church plans and proportions ===
According to 1870s studies by Nikodim Kondakov, the architecture of the Byzantine Empire employed three distinct church layouts:

- The earliest standard of a symmetrical, single-dome cathedral ("Hagia Sophia standard") was set in the 6th century by Justinian I. Traditional Byzantine cathedrals had two pendentives or apses; the Russian standard developed by Kuzmin, Grimm and Kosyakov employed four.
- The "Ravenna standard" of Byzantine Italy employed elongated basilicas. It remained common in Western Europe but was rarely used in Russia.
- The five-domed type emerged in the 9th century and flourished during the Macedonian and Comnenian dynasties. It was the preferred plan for Russian Orthodox churches for centuries.

Large Neo-Byzantine cathedrals erected in Russia followed either the single-dome or the five-dome plan. The single-dome plan was standardized by David Grimm and Vasily Kosyakov, and used throughout the Empire with minimal changes. Five-dome architecture displayed greater variety as architects experimented with proportions and placement of the side domes:

Proportions of five-dome cathedrals
Saint Petersburg, 1908–1915	Tomsk, 1909–1911	Novocherkassk, 1891–1905	Kharkiv, 1888–1901

Smaller churches almost always followed the single-dome plan. In a few cases (as in the Saint George church in Ardon, 1885–1901) very small side domes were mechanically added to a basic single-dome floorplan. Basilica churches emerged in the last decade of the Empire; all examples were small parish churches like the Kutuzov Hut Chapel in Moscow.

=== Belltower problem ===
The Neoclassical canon dictated that the belltower should be substantially taller than the main dome. A lean, tall belltower ideally balanced the relatively flat main structure. As early as the 1830s, Konstantin Thon and his followers ran into the "belltower problem": the compact vertical shapes of Thon's Russo-Byzantine cathedrals did not blend well with traditional belltowers. Thon's solution was to remove the belltower altogether, installing bells on a small detached belfry (Cathedral of Christ the Saviour), or integrating the belfry into the main structure (Yelets cathedral). The same problem persisted in Neo-Byzantine designs, at least in the conventional tall structures inspired by Grimm's Tbilisi cathedral. Grimm himself placed the bells in a fully detached, relatively low tower situated far behind the cathedral. However, the clergy clearly preferred integrated belltowers; detached belfries remained uncommon.

Ernest Gibert, author of the Samara cathedral (1867–1894), on the contrary, installed a massive tall belltower right above the main portal. Gibere deliberately placed the belltower unusually close to the main dome, so that at most viewing angles they blended in a single vertical shape. This layout was favored by the clergy but bitterly criticized by contemporary architects like Antony Tomishko (architect of Kresty Prison and its Byzantine church of Alexander Nevsky). It was reproduced in Tashkent (1867–1887), Łódź (1881–1884), Valaam Monastery (1887–1896), Kharkov (1888–1901), Saratov (1899) and other towns and monasteries. Most of the Byzantine buildings, however, followed the middle road: the belltower was also set above the portal, but it was relatively low (on par with side domes or apses or even lower), and spaced aside from the main dome (Riga cathedral, (1876–1884), Novocherkassk cathedral (1891–1904) and others).

== Legacy ==
=== Destruction ===
Byzantine architecture, like Russian Revival, had the least chance to survive the anti-religious campaign of the 1920s. Destruction peaked in 1930, targeting large downtown cathedrals with no apparent logic: Kharkov cathedral of Saint Nicholas was demolished "to streamline tram lines", while the larger cathedral of Annunciation remained standing. Most of remaining churches were closed, converted to warehouses, cinemas or offices, and left to rot without proper maintenance. Nevertheless, majority of Byzantine churches survived past the fall of the Soviet Union. The table below, including all major Byzantine cathedrals and large parish churches, summarized current (2008) state of destruction and preservation:

Table: Neo-Byzantine cathedrals of the Russian Empire

Location	Country (2007 borders)	Building name	Other wiki	Architect	Construction began	Construction completed	Fate	Notes
Ardon, North Ossetia–Alania	Russia	Church of Saint George	..	..	1885	1901	Extant	
Astrakhan	Russia	Church of Saint Vladimir	commons	Vasily Kosyakov	1895	1902	Extant	
Bakhchisaray	Ukraine	Church of Saint Innocenty of Irkutsk	..	..	..	1896	Damaged by earthquake in 1927, demolished in the 1930s	
Białowieża	Poland	Church of Saint Nicholas	:pl, commons	Friedrich Przhezslavsky	1895	1897	Extant	
Birsk	Russia	Church of Three Saints of Kazan	..	..	1895	1899	Extant; renamed Church of Saint Nicholas	
Căpriana monastery	Moldova	Cathedral of Saint George	commons	Attr.to Alexander Bernardazzi	..	1903	Extant	
Chersonesos	Ukraine	Church of Saint Vladimir (Chersonesus Cathedral)	:de	David Grimm	1861	1879	Extant	
Chişinău	Moldova	Church of Saint Panteleimon	..	Alexander Bernardazzi	1889	1891	Extant	
Chita	Russia	Cathedral of Saint Alexander Nevsky	..	..	1899	1909	Demolished in 1936-1937	
Feodosiya	Ukraine	Cathedral of Saint Alexander Nevsky	..	..	..	1871	Demolished	
Feodosiya	Ukraine	Church of Kazan Icon in Teplovsky Monastery	..	Keil	..	1907	Extant	
Fergana	Uzbekistan	Church of Saint Alexander Nevsky	..	Sakovich	1891	1899	Demolished in 1936	
Ganja	Azerbaijan	Church of Saint Alexander Nevsky	..	..	..	1887	Extant	
Gelendzhik	Russia	Church of Ascension	..	Vasilyev	1905	1909	Extant	
Hlukhiv	Ukraine	Church of Saint Anastasios	..	Andrey Huhn	1884	1893	Extant	
Gurzuf	Ukraine	Church of Dormition	..	attr. to Dmitry Chichagov	1887	1891	Demolished	
Irkutsk	Russia	Cathedral of Kazan Icon	..	Heinrich Rosen	1875	1892	Demolished in the 1930s	
Irkutsk	Russia	"City" Church of Kazan Icon	commons	Unknown	1885	1892	Extant; Byzantine domes were rebuilt into tented roofs	
Irkutsk	Russia	Church of Annunciation	..	..	1888	1891	Demolished in the 1920s	
Ivanovo	Russia	Church of the Saviour	commons	Fyodor Schechtel	1898	1903	Demolished in 1937	
Kalisz	Poland	"Russian" church	..	..	..	1876	Demolished	
Kamianets-Podilskyi	Ukraine	Church of Saint Alexander Nevsky	..	..	1891	1898	Demolished in 1932; replica built in 2000	
Kars	Turkey	"Military" Cathedral	..	..	..	..	Demolished	
Kaunas	Lithuania	Cathedral of Saint Peter and Paul in Kovno fortress	..	K. H. Limarenko	1891	1895	Extant, converted to Roman Catholic church	
Kharkiv	Ukraine	Church of Saint Nicholas	:ru	Vladimir Nemkin	1887	1896	Demolished in 1930	
Kharkiv	Ukraine	Cathedral of Annunciation	:ru	Mikhail Lovtsov	1888	1901	Extant	
Kharkiv	Ukraine	Church of Kazan Icon	..	Vladimir Nemkin	1904	1912	Extant, never closed	
Kharkiv	Ukraine	Church of the Ozerian Icon on the Cold Hill	:ru	Vladimir Nemkin	1892	1901	Extant	
Kherson Oblast	Ukraine	Trinity Cathedral of Annunciation Convent	..	..	1900	1909	Demolished	
Khotkovo Convent	Russia	Cathedral of Saint Nicholas	commons	Alexander Latkov	1899	1904	Extant	
Kielce	Poland	Church of Saint Nicholas ("Garrison Church")	:pl, commons	Stanisław Szpakowsky	1902	1904	Extant, converted to Roman Catholic church	
Kotly, Leningrad Oblast	Russia	Church of Saint Nicholas	..	Nikolay Nikonov	1882	1910	Extant	
Kislovodsk	Russia	Church of Saint Nicholas	..	..	..	1888	Demolished; eponymous cathedral built in 1993-2006 in different style	
Kolomna	Russia	Church of Holy Trinity	..	Max Hoeppener	1892	1907	Extant, heavily damaged	
Krasnodar	Russia	Cathedral of Saint Catherine	..	Ivan Malgerb	1898	1914	Extant	
Krasnodar	Russia	Church of Resurrection	..	..	1887	1892	Demolished in the 1930s	
Kronstadt	Russia	Cathedral of Saint Nicholas (Naval Cathedral)	:ru, commons	Vasily Kosyakov	1901	1913	Extant	
Kronstadt	Russia	Church of Saint Nicholas (Hospital Church)	..	Vasily Kosyakov	..	1905	Extant	
Kultaevo, Perm Krai	Russia	Church of Saint John the Baptist	..	..	1911	1917	Extant	
Kyiv	Ukraine	Cathedral of Saint Vladimir	..	Various architects	1862	1897	Extant	
Kyiv	Ukraine	Church of Saint Alexander Nevsky	..	..	..	1888	Demolished in 1939	
Kyiv	Ukraine	Church of Annunciation	commons	..	..	..	Demolished in the 1930s	
Kyiv	Ukraine	Church of Presentation	commons	..	..	..	Demolished in the 1930s	
Livadia	Ukraine	Church of the Cross of our Lord in Livadia Palace	commons	Ippolit Monighetti; Nikolay Krasnov	1862	1866	Extant	
Livadia	Ukraine	Church of Ascension	..	Alphonse Vincennes	1872	1876	Destroyed by earthquake in 1927	
Łódź	Poland	Church of Saint Alexander Nevsky	:pl	Karl Maevsky	1880	1884	Extant	
Luga, Leningrad Oblast	Russia	Church of Kazan Icon	..	Nikolay Kudtyavtsev	1901	1904	Extant	
Lviv	Ukraine	Church of Saint George	:ru	Vincent Ravsky	1897	1901	Extant	
Lysva	Russia	Church of Holy Trinity	..	Alexander Turchevich	1891	1898	Demolished in 1930	
Maloyaroslavets	Russia	Cathedral of the Dormition of Theotokos in Saint Tikhon Monastery	..	Boleslav Savitsky	1894	1905	Extant	
Maloyaroslavets	Russia	Cathedral of Transfiguration of our Saviour in Saint Tikhon Monastery	..	Boleslav Savitsky	1894	1897	Extant	
Manglisi	Georgia	Church of Saint Peter and Saint Paul ("Military Church")	..	..	..	1897	Demolished	
Moscow	Russia	Church of Kazan Icon by Kaluga Gates	commons	Nikolay Nikitin	1876	1886	Demolished	
Moscow	Russia	Church of Saint John Chrysostom in Donskoy Monastery	..	Alexander Vincennes	1888	1891	Extant	
Moscow	Russia	Church of Theotokos Orans in Aksinyino	commons	Alexander Weydenbaum	1883	1900	Extant	
Moscow	Russia	Church of Saint Demetrios in Devichye Pole	commons	Konstantin Bykovsky	1886	1895	Extant	
Moscow	Russia	Cathedral of the Epiphany in Dorogomilovo	..	Vasily Sretensky	1898	1910	Demolished	
Moscow	Russia	Church of Theotokos of Vatopedi	..	Vladimir Adamovich	1908	1909	Extant	
Moscow	Russia	Church of Theotokos Orans in Kuntsevo	commons	Sergey Solovyov	1911	1913	Extant	
Moscow	Russia	Church of Archangel Michael by Kutuzov's Hut	commons	Mikhail Litvinov	1911	1912	Extant	
Moscow	Russia	Church of Saint George in Georgian Sloboda	commons	Vasily Sretensky	1879	1899	Externally extant, converted to college classes inside	
Moscow	Russia	Church of Protection of Theotokos (Old Believers)	commons	Vladimir Desyatov	1908	1910	Extant	
Mykolaiv	Ukraine	Church of Saint Alexander Nevsky of the Naval Hospital	..	..	..	1886	Heavily damaged, under reconstruction	
Narva	Estonia	Church of Resurrection	commons	Pavel Alish	1890	1896	Extant	
New Athos monastery	Georgia (Abkhazia)	Monastery of Saint Simon Cannaanite	..	Nikolay Nikonov	1888	1900	Extant	
Nikolaevka, Birsk District, Bashkortostan	Russia	Church of Archangel Michael	..	..	1907	1917	Abandoned, slowly decaying as at November 2006	
Nizhny Novgorod	Russia	Cathedral of Transfiguration of our Saviour	..	Pavel Malinovsky	1900	1904	Extant	
Nizhnyaya Salda	Russia	Church of Saint Alexander Nevsky	..	Segey Kozlov	..	1905	Extant, under reconstruction	
Noul Neamţ Monastery	Moldova	Winter church	..	..	1902	1905	Extant	
Novocherkassk	Russia	Cathedral of Ascension ("Military Cathedral")	commons	Alexander Yaschenko	1891	1905	Extant	
Novocherkassk	Russia	Church of Saint Alexander Nevsky	..	N. E. Anokhin	1888	1903	Extant	
Novoosetinovskaya, North Ossetia–Alania	Russia	Church of Saint Nicholas	..	Alexander Bogdanov	1911	1918	Extant, under reconstruction	
Novosibirsk	Russia	Church of Saint Alexander Nevsky	commons	N. Solovyov	1896	1899	Extant	
Oboyan, Kursk Oblast	Russia	Cathedral of Saint Alexander Nevsky	..	Vladimir Slesarev	..	1907	Extant	
Odessa	Ukraine	Church of Prophet Elijah in eponymous monastery	..	..	..	1886	Extant	
Odessa	Ukraine	Church of the Icon of Our Lady Feeding Milk	..	..	..	1896	Demolished	
Orenburg	Russia	Cathedral of Kazan Icon	..	Alexander Yaschenko	1886	1895	Demolished in 1932-1936	
Ostroh	Ukraine	Church of the Epiphany (rebuild of a medieval church)	..	..	1887	1891	Extant	
Plastunovskaya, Krasnodar Krai	Russia	Church of Ascension	..	..	1870	1899	Extant	
Polotsk	Belarus	Cathedral of Saint Euphrosyne monastery	commons	Vladimir Korshikov	1893	1899	Extant	
Ponyri Vtorye, Kursk Oblast	Russia	Church of Holy Trinity	..	Nikolay Grushetsky	1903	1910	Extant	
Poti	Georgia	Poti Cathedral	..	Alexander Zelenko, Robert Marfeld	1905	1907	Demolished	
Prokhladnaya, Kabardino-Balkaria	Russia	Church of Saint Nicholas	..	Vladimir Grosmann; Mikhail Surmievich	1882	1886	Extant	
Riga	Latvia	Cathedral of Nativity of Christ	..	Robert Pflug	1875	1884	Extant	
Rostov-na-Donu	Russia	Cathedral of Saint Alexander Nevsky	..	Alexander Yaschenko	1891	1908	Demolished in the 1920s	
Rostov-na-Donu (Nor Nakhichevan)	Russia	Church of Saint Alexander Nevsky	..	Alexander Pomerantsev	..	1898	Demolished in 1937	
Saint Petersburg	Russia	Church of Demetrios of Thessaloniki in Greek Square	..	Roman Kuzmin	1861	1866	Received direct bomb hit in World War II, demolished in 1959	
Saint Petersburg	Russia	Church in memoria of grand duchess Alexandra Nikolaevna at the Model Orphanage	..	Fyodor Kharlamov	1867	1876	Demolished in 1938	
Saint Petersburg	Russia	Church of Saviour (Shuvalovskoe Cemetery)	..	Konstantin Kuzmin	1876	1880	Extant	
Saint Petersburg	Russia	Church of Blessed Andrew in Timenkov Almshouse	..	Karl Wehrheim	1871	1877	Demolished	
Saint Petersburg	Russia	Church of Kazan Icon in Yeliseev Almshouse	..	Karl Wehrheim, Ferdinand Miller	1881	1885	Demolished in 1929	
Saint Petersburg	Russia	Church of Our Lady the Merciful	:ru, commons	Vasily Kosyakov	1888	1898	Extant, operated by the Navy, poor condition	
Saint Petersburg	Russia	Church of Saint Alexander Nevsky in Kresty Prison	..	Antony Tomishko	1889	1890	Extant	
Saint Petersburg	Russia	Convent of Saint John by Karpovka River	:ru	Nikolay Nikonov	1899	1911	Extant. Official residence of the Patriarch in Saint Petersburg	
Saint Petersburg	Russia	Church of Dormition and Saint Basil	..	Nikolay Nikonov	1905	1908	Demolished in 1932-1933	
Saint Petersburg	Russia	Church of Kazan Icon (Novodevichy Convent)	:ru	Vasily Kosyakov	1908	1915	Extant	
Samara	Russia	Church of Smolensk Icon	..	..	..	..	Demolished	
Samara	Russia	Cathedral of Resurrection of our Saviour	..	Ernest Gibere	1886	1894	Demolished in 1930	
Samara	Russia	Church of Saint Nicholas in Saint Nicholas Monastery	..	..	..	..	Demolished in 1930	
Saratov	Russia	Church of Saint Nicholas	..	..	1901	1904	Demolished	
Saratov	Russia	Church in the Convent of the Cross	..	Yury Terlikov	1899	1904	Demolished	
Serpovoye, Tambov Oblast	Russia	Church of Resurrection	..	Unknown	1900	1909	Extant	
Sevastopol	Ukraine	Cathedral of Saint Vladimir	:ru, :es	Aleksei Avdeyev	1873	1888	Extant	
Sevastopol	Ukraine	Church of Saint Alexander Nevsky	..	..	..	1896	Demolished	
Stary Oskol, Kursk Oblast	Russia	Church of Saint Alexander Nevsky	commons	..	1900	1903	Extant, Cathedral of Belgorod Diocese since 1995	
Strelna	Russia	Church of Resurrection of our Saviour in Trinity-Sergiev Pustyn	..	Alfred Parland, Ignaty Malyshev	1872	1874	Demolished in the 1960s	
Strelna	Russia	Church of Saint Sergius of Radonezh in Trinity-Sergiev Pustyn	..	Alexey Gornostaev	1854	1859	Demolished in the 1960s	
Struzhany, Ryazan Oblast	Russia	Church of Dormition	..	..	..	1909	Extant	
Sunzha, North Ossetia–Alania	Russia	Church of Saint Nicholas	..	..	1866	1876	Demolished in the 1930s	
Svencionys	Lithuania	Church of Lifegiving Trinity	..	..	..	1898	Extant	
Szlachtowa, Ruś Szlachtowska	Poland	Church of the Intercession	commons	..	..	..	Extant	
Tashkent	Uzbekistan	Cathedral of Transfiguration of our Saviour	:ru	Ludwig Urlaub	1871	1882	Demolished in the 1930s	
Tbilisi	Georgia	Cathedral of Saint Alexander Nevsky	commons	David Grimm	1871	1897	Demolished in 1930	
Tomsk	Russia	Cathedral of Saint Peter and Paul	commons	August Lange	1909	1911	Extant	
Valaam Monastery	Russia	Church of Transfiguration of our Saviour	commons	Alexey Silin, Grigory Karpov	1887	1896	Extant	
Valuyky Monastery, Kursk Oblast	Russia	Church of Saint Nicholas in Valuyki Monastery	..	..	..	1913	Demolished	
Verkhoturye	Russia	Church of the Cross in Saint Nicholas Monastery	..	Alexander Turchevich	1905	1913	Extant	
Vilnius	Lithuania	Church of Archangel Michael	..	..	1893	1895	Extant	
Vilnius	Lithuania	Church of Theotokos Orans (Our Lady of the Sign Church)	..	..	1899	1903	Extant	
Vilnius	Lithuania	Church of Saint Paraskeva	:ru	Martzinovsky	..	1864	Extant	
Vilnius	Lithuania	Church of Saint Nicholas in Lukishki prison	commons	..	..	1899	Extant	
Visim, Perm Krai	Russia	Church of Saint Anatoly and Saint Nicholas	..	..	1889	1895	Extant, heavily damaged	
Volgograd	Russia	Cathedral of Saint Alexander Nevsky	..	Alexander Yaschenko	1901	1918	Demolished in 1932; replica built in 2021	
Voznesenka, Bashkortostan	Russia	Church of Ascension	..	..	..	1910	Extant	
Yekaterinburg	Russia	Church of All Saints in New Tikhvin Convent	:ru, commons	..	1900	1902	Extant	
Yermashevo, Republic of Bashkortostan	Russia	Church of Kazan Icon	..	..	..	1904	Extant	
Yelovo, Perm Krai	Russia	Church of Saint Peter and Saint Paul	..	..	..	1891	Extant	
Yershovka, Perm Krai	Russia	Church of Saint Nicholas	..	Alexander Turchevich	1899	1908	Extant	
Yevpatoria	Ukraine	Cathedral of Saint Nicholas	commons	Alexander Bernardazzi	1897	1899	Extant	
Yevpatoria	Ukraine	Greek Church of Prophet Elijah	commons	attr. to A.A.Heinrich	1911	1918	Extant, converted to Russian Orthodoxy	
Włocławek	Poland	Church of Saint Nicholas	..	..	1902	1905	..	

Table: Neo-Byzantine cathedrals and churches built by Russian Empire overseas

Location	Country (2007 borders)	Building name	Other wiki	Architect	Construction began	Construction completed	Fate	Notes
Biarritz	France	Church of Nativity of Theotokos	commons	Nikolay Nikonov	1888	1892	Extant	
Jerusalem	Israel	Cathedral of Holy Trinity (Russian Compound)	:image	..	..	..	Extant	
Jerusalem	Israel	Church of Resurrection (Russian Compound)	..	..	..	..	Extant	
Jerusalem	Israel	Church of Kazan Icon (Russian Compound)	..	..	..	..	Extant	
Harbin	China	Cathedral of Annunciation	commons	Boris Tustanovsky	1930	1941	Demolished in 1966	
Harbin	China	Church of Protection of Theotokos	..	Yury Zhdanov	1922	1922 / 1930	Designed in 1905. Extant. Operates as the only Orthodox church in Harbin since 1984	
Bad Kissingen	Germany	Church of Saint Sergius of Radonezh	..	Victor Shroeter	1898	1901	..	
Nice	France	Chapel in memoria of the late Nicholas Alexandrovich	..	David Grimm	1866	1868	Extant	
Sofia	Bulgaria	Cathedral of Saint Alexander Nevsky	..	Alexander Pomerantsev	1904	1912	Extant	
Varna	Bulgaria	Cathedral of Dormition of Theotokos	commons	Ivan Maas	1880	1886	Extant, seat of Bishop of Varna and Preslav	

=== Revival of 1990s–2000s ===
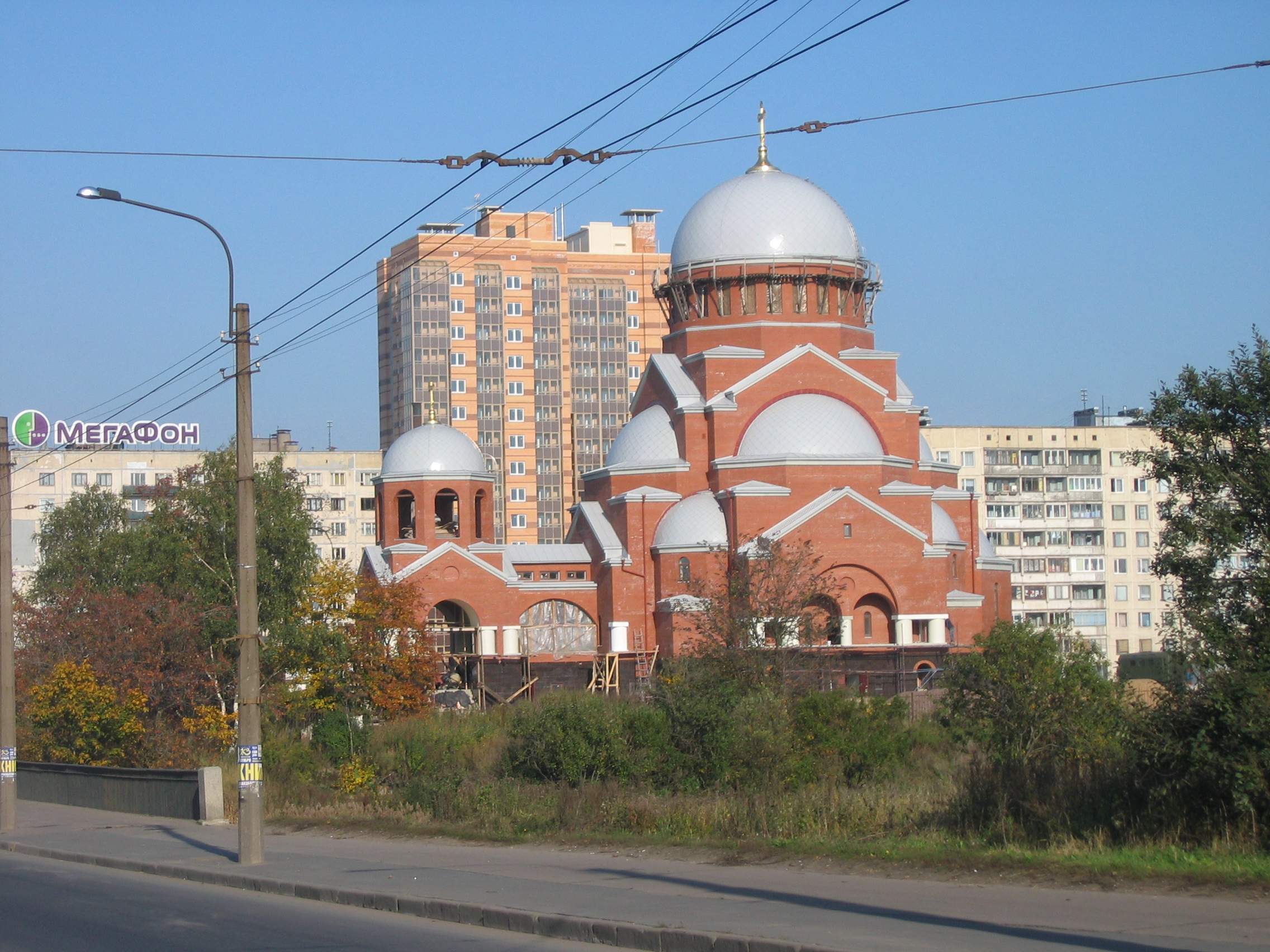
Contemporary imitation of Byzantine style in concrete, Saint Petersburg, 1998–2008

The Byzantine style remains uncommon in contemporary Russian architecture. There have been projects attempting to imitate the outline and composition of typical Neo-Byzantine cathedrals in reinforced concrete, omitting the elaborate brickwork of historical prototypes (e.g. Church of Presentation of Jesus in Saint Petersburg).

Restoration of historical churches so far has a mixed record of success. There is at least one example of a Byzantine design ("City" church of Kazan Icon in Irkutsk) "restored" to imitate Russian Revival by adding tented roofs. While major cathedrals have been restored, churches in depopulated rural settlements or in the military bases (i.e. church of Our Lady the Merciful in Saint Petersburg) remain in dilapidated conditions.

== See also ==
- Bristol Byzantine – a regional English variant
