= Pankovo =

Pankovo (Russian: Паньково) may refer to:

- Pankovo, Yelovsky District, Perm Krai, rural locality in Dubrovskoye Rural Settlement, Yelovsky District, Perm Krai, Russia
- Pankovo (Petrovac), village situated in Petrovac na Mlavi municipality in Serbia
- Pankovo, Belozersky District, Vologda Oblast, rural locality in Belozersky District, Vologda Oblast, Russia
- Pankovo, Mezhdurechensky District, Vologda Oblast, rural locality in Sukhonskoye Rural Settlement, Mezhdurechensky District, Vologda Oblast, Russia
- Pankovo, Vozhegodsky District, Vologda Oblast, rural locality in Beketovskoye Rural Settlement, Vozhegodsky District, Vologda Oblast, Russia
- Pan'kovo test range, missile launch site of the Russian Armed Forces on Yuzhny Island of the Novaya Zemlya archipelago, Russia
