= Zonovo =

Zonovo Зоново
- Village
- Location within Perm Krai Location within Russia
- Coordinates: 56°58′N 54°30′E
- Country: Russia
- Region: Perm Krai
- District: Yelovsky District
- Time zone: UTC+5:00

Zonovo (Russian: Зоново) is a rural locality (a village) in Dubrovskoye Rural Settlement, Yelovsky District, Perm Krai, Russia. The population was 26 as of 2010. There are 3 streets.

== Geography ==
Zonovo is located 34 km southwest of Yelovo (the district's administrative centre) by road. Dubrovo is the nearest rural locality.
