= Bryukhovo =

Bryukhovo Брюхово
- Selo
- Location within Perm Krai Location within Russia
- Coordinates: 56°51′N 54°51′E
- Country: Russia
- Region: Perm Krai
- District: Yelovsky District
- Time zone: UTC+5:00

Bryukhovo (Russian: Брюхово) is a rural locality (a selo) and the administrative center of Bryukhovskoye Rural Settlement, Yelovsky District, Perm Krai, Russia. The population was 377 as of 2010. There are 7 streets.

== Geography ==
Bryukhovo is located 29 km south of Yelovo (the district's administrative centre) by road. Prokhoryata is the nearest rural locality.
