= Shuldikha =

Shuldikha Шульдиха
- Village
- Location within Perm Krai Location within Russia
- Coordinates: 57°01′N 54°37′E
- Country: Russia
- Region: Perm Krai
- District: Yelovsky District
- Time zone: UTC+5:00

Shuldikha (Russian: Шульдиха) is a rural locality (a village) in Dubrovskoye Rural Settlement, Yelovsky District, Perm Krai, Russia. The population was 263 as of 2010. There are 2 streets.

== Geography ==
Shuldikha is located 28 km west of Yelovo (the district's administrative centre) by road. It is off of the Kama River. Dubrovo is the nearest rural locality.
