= Plishkino =

Plishkino Плишкино
- Village
- Location within Perm Krai Location within Russia
- Coordinates: 56°57′N 54°25′E
- Country: Russia
- Region: Perm Krai
- District: Yelovsky District
- Time zone: UTC+5:00

Plishkino (Russian: Плишкино) is a rural locality (a village) in Dubrovskoye Rural Settlement, Yelovsky District, Perm Krai, Russia. The population was 118 as of 2010. There are 4 streets.

== Geography ==
Plishkino is located 39 km southwest of Yelovo (the district's administrative centre) by road. Pankovo is the nearest rural locality.
