= Yelovo =

Yelovo (Russian: Ело́во) is the name of several rural localities in Russia:

- Yelovo, Ivanovo Oblast, a village in Lukhsky District of Ivanovo Oblast
- Yelovo, Perm Krai, a selo in Yelovsky District of Perm Krai
- Yelovo, Krasnogorsky District, Udmurt Republic, a village in Vasilyevsky Selsoviet of Krasnogorsky District of the Udmurt Republic
- Yelovo, Yarsky District, Udmurt Republic, a selo in Yelovsky Selsoviet of Yarsky District of the Udmurt Republic
