= Pankovo, Yelovsky District, Perm Krai =

Pankovo Паньково
- Village
- Location within Perm Krai Location within Russia
- Coordinates: 56°56′N 54°23′E
- Country: Russia
- Region: Perm Krai
- District: Yelovsky District
- Time zone: UTC+5:00

Pankovo (Russian: Паньково) is a rural locality (a village) in Dubrovskoye Rural Settlement, Yelovsky District, Perm Krai, Russia. The population was 32 as of 2010. There are 4 streets.

== Geography ==
Pankovo is located 42 km southwest of Yelovo (the district's administrative centre) by road. Plishkino is the nearest rural locality.
