= Novocherkassk Cathedral =

Novocherkassk Ascension Cathedral Новочеркасский Вознесе́нский Собор Novocherkasskiy Voznesenskiy Sobor
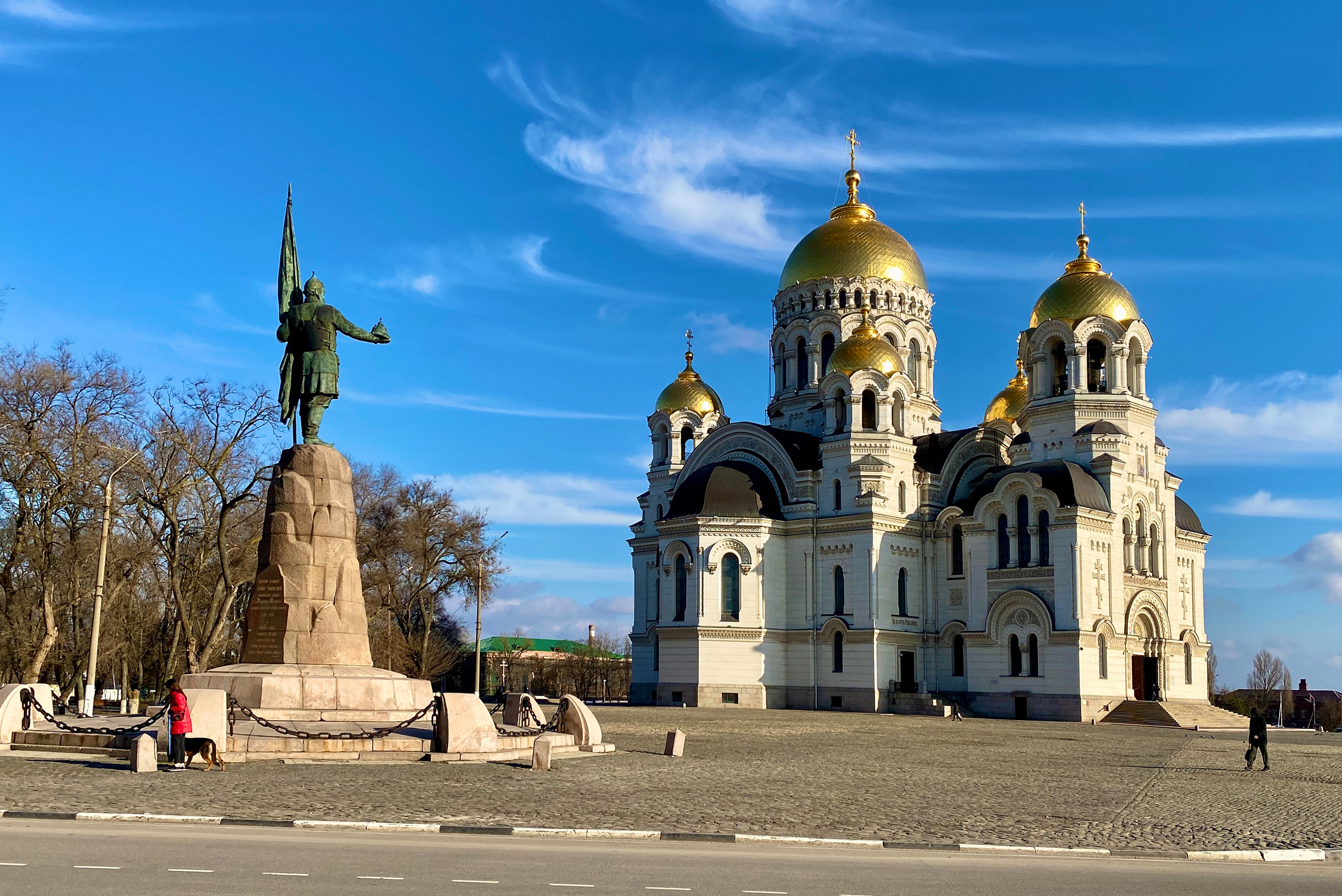

Religion
- Affiliation: Russian Orthodox

Location
- Location: Ermaka Square 2 (346429), Novocherkassk
- Interactive map of Novocherkassk Ascension Cathedral; Новочеркасский Вознесе́нский Собор; Novocherkasskiy Voznesenskiy Sobor
- Coordinates: 47°24′50.612″N 40°6′37.0828″E

Architecture
- Architect: Alexander Yashchenko
- Style: Neo-Byzantine
- Completed: 1904

Specifications
- Capacity: 5,000
- Length: 76,8 m (interior); 85.8 m (exterior-stairs)
- Width: 62 m
- Interior area: 2,900 m² (interior); 3,200 m² (exterior-stairs)
- Height (max): 74.7 m (top cross)
- Dome dia. (outer): 21.5 m

Website
- Solnzedona.ru

The Ascension Cathedral (Russian: Вознесенский собор) is a Russian Orthodox church in Novocherkassk, Rostov Oblast, Russia. It used to be one of the largest churches of the Russian Empire and the main church of the Don Host Province.

The five-domed building, which stands 75 meters tall, is a notable example of the Russian Neo-Byzantine architecture. It was erected between 1891 and 1904 on the site of an earlier church. The first church on the site was built to Luigi Rusca's designs. It collapsed in 1846. A replacement church collapsed 17 years later.

The existing church building was designed by a local architect, Alexander Yashchenko, and dedicated in 1905. The worshipers were expelled from the church by the Communists in 1934. The Orthodox congregation resumed services in the upper church in 1942, after the Communists had been ousted from the Don Region by the Wehrmacht.

The Starocherkassk and Novocherkassk cathedrals are considered the main spiritual centres of the Don Cossackdom. Matvey Platov, Vasily Orlov-Denisov, Yakov Baklanov, and other atamans of the Don Cossack Host are buried in the church. A bronze statue of Yermak, the conqueror of Siberia, in front of the porch was designed by Mikhail Mikeshin.

== Gallery ==
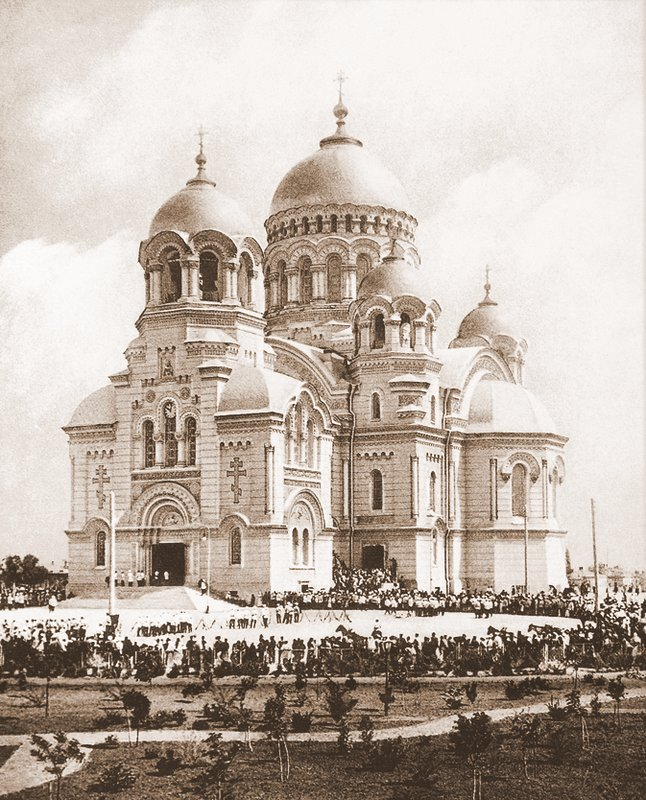
The Don Metropolitan Cathedral during the consecration festivities in 1905

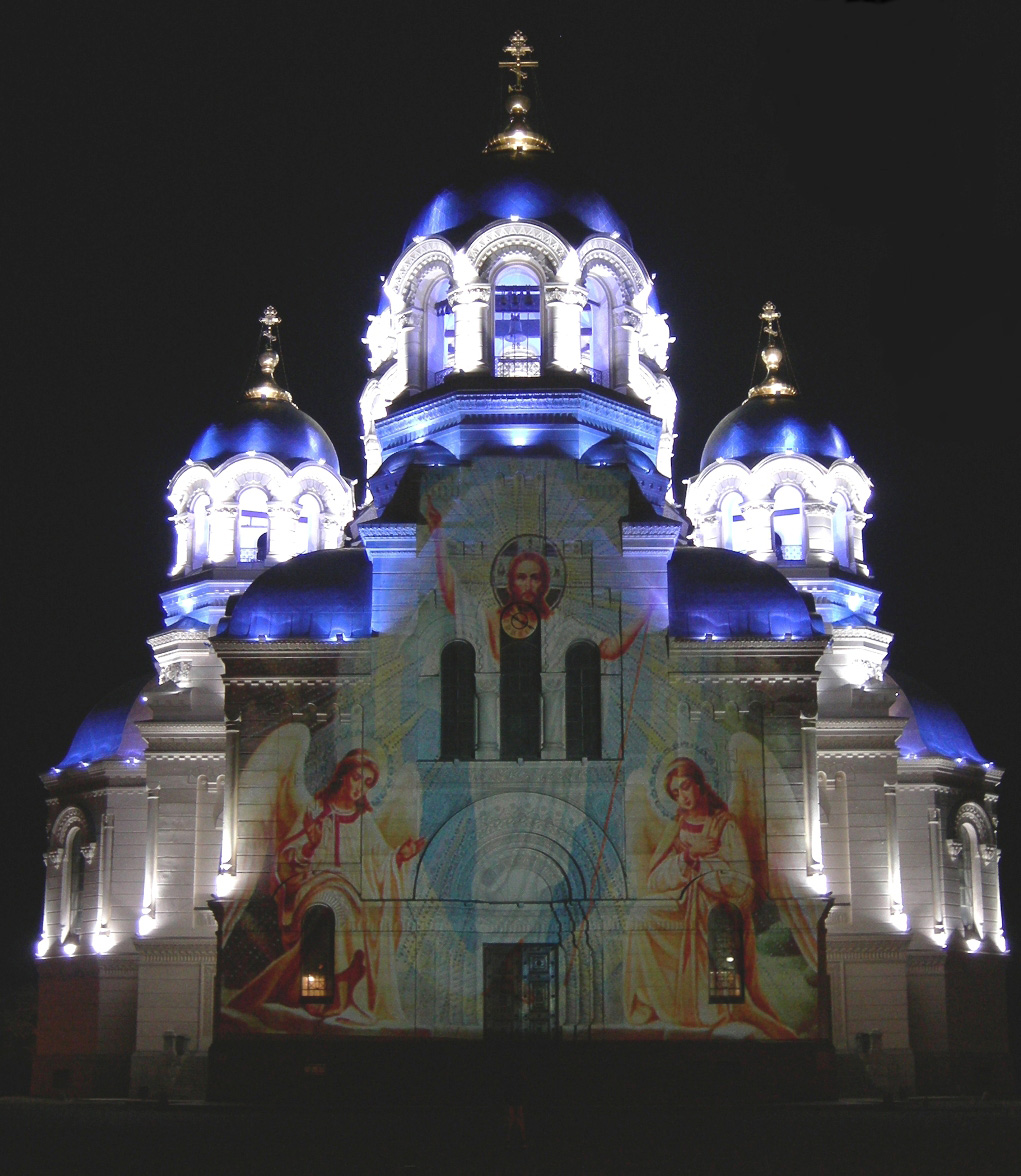
The church at night

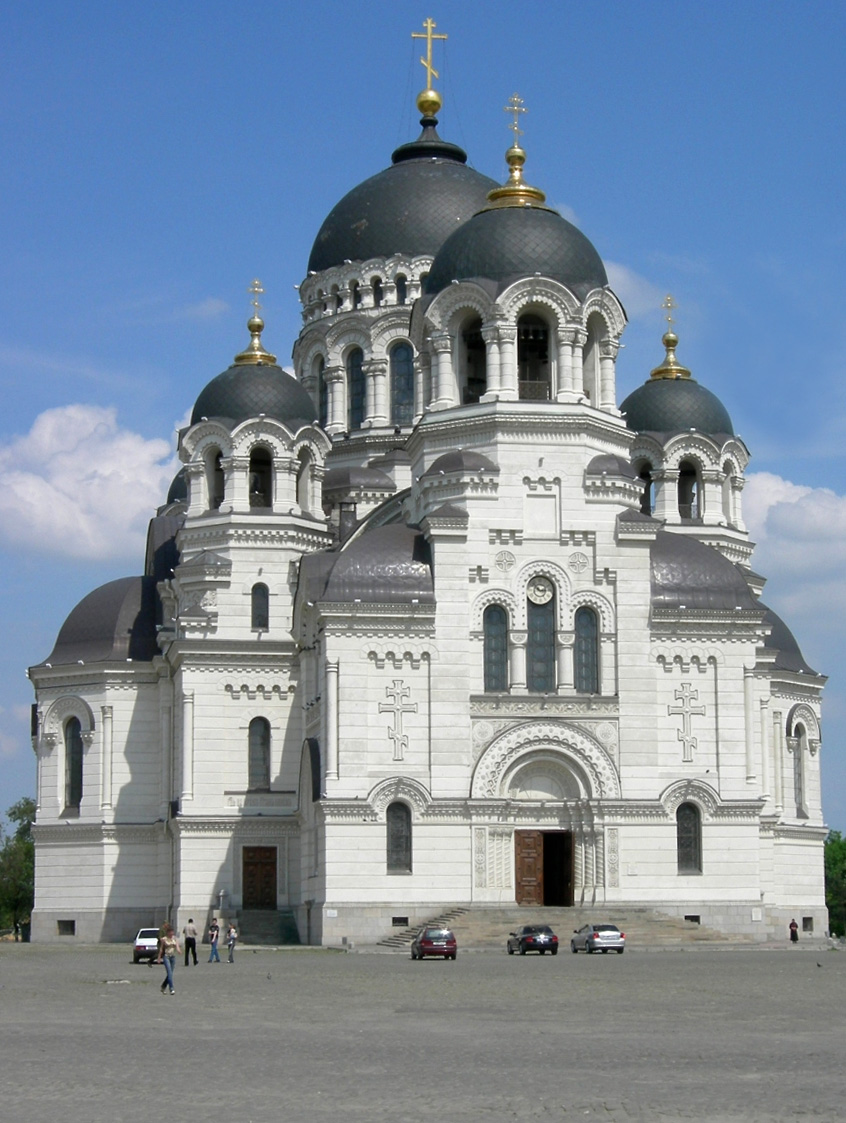
The bell tower over the porch, 2006

== See also ==
- Rostov-on-Don Cathedral
- List of largest Eastern Orthodox church buildings
- Neo-Byzantine architecture in the Russian Empire
