= Church of Our Lady of the Sign, Vilnius =

Church building in Vilnius, Lithuania

Coordinates: 54°41′26″N 25°15′26″E

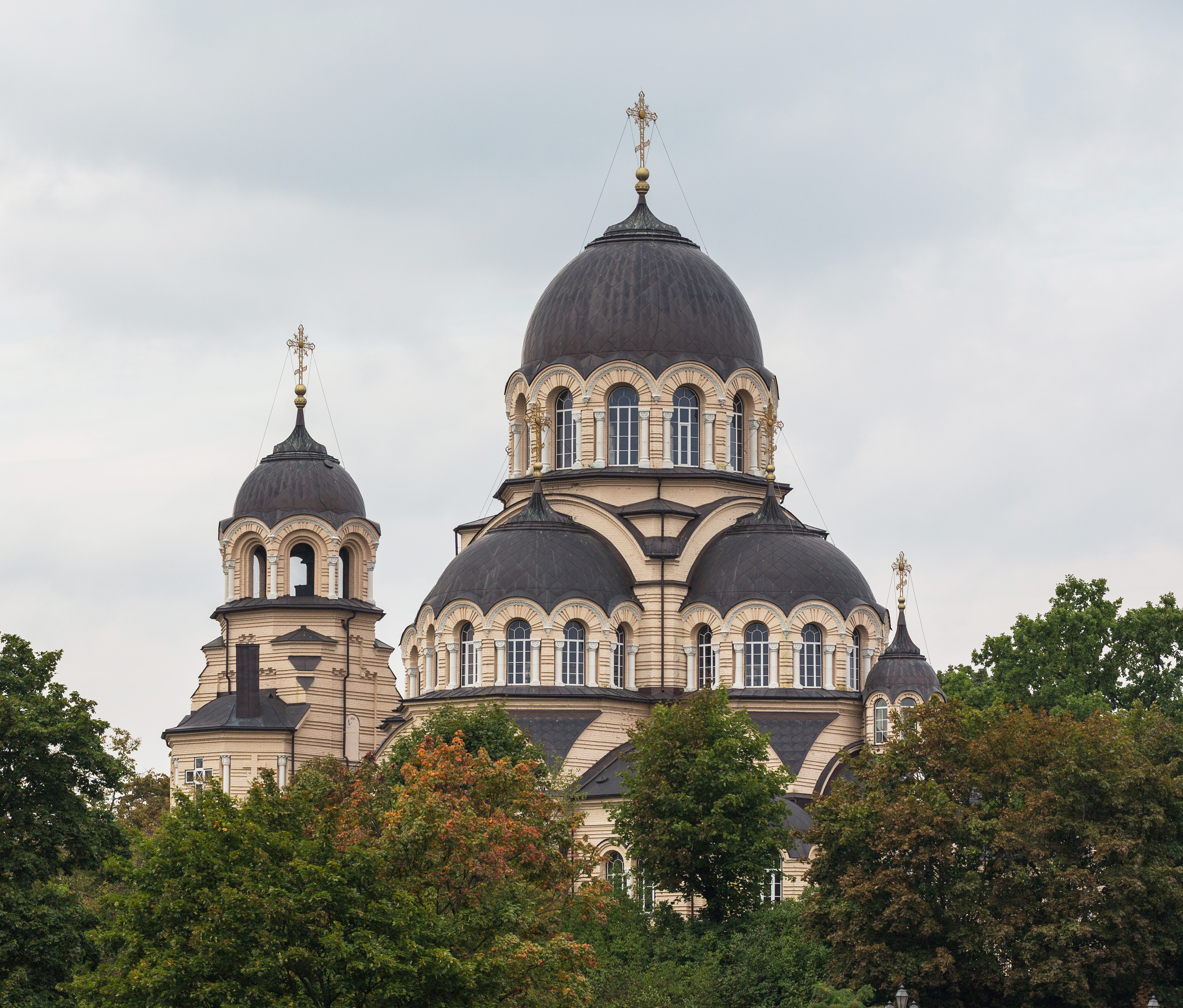
Our Lady of the Sign Church

Our Lady of the Sign Church (Russian: Знаменская церковь; Lithuanian: Dievo Motinos ikonos „Ženklas iš dangaus“ cerkvė) is an Eastern Orthodox church in the Žvėrynas district of Vilnius, built in 1903, belonging to the Russian Orthodox Diocese of Lithuania.

The idea of building a new Orthodox church in Vilnius came from Orthodox Brotherhood of the Holy Spirit, which also organised a collection of funds in the whole Russian Empire. The church, constructed in the most popular Neo-Byzantine style, was consecrated in 1903 by Iuvenaliy, the Orthodox archbishop of Vilnius. He also opened a school for poor children and a library which were to be run by the church's clergy. In order to commemorate the day, he granted to the newly established parish a copy of Our Lady of Kursk icon.

Unlike many other Orthodox churches in Vilnius, the church was not closed during World War I, nor during World War II. The Soviet government agreed to register it as a parish church in 1948. Before 1956, the church was robbed a few times, losing part of the icons from the original iconostasis which had to be replaced by a far humbler one. The church was fully restored inside and outside in 2009.

== Gallery ==
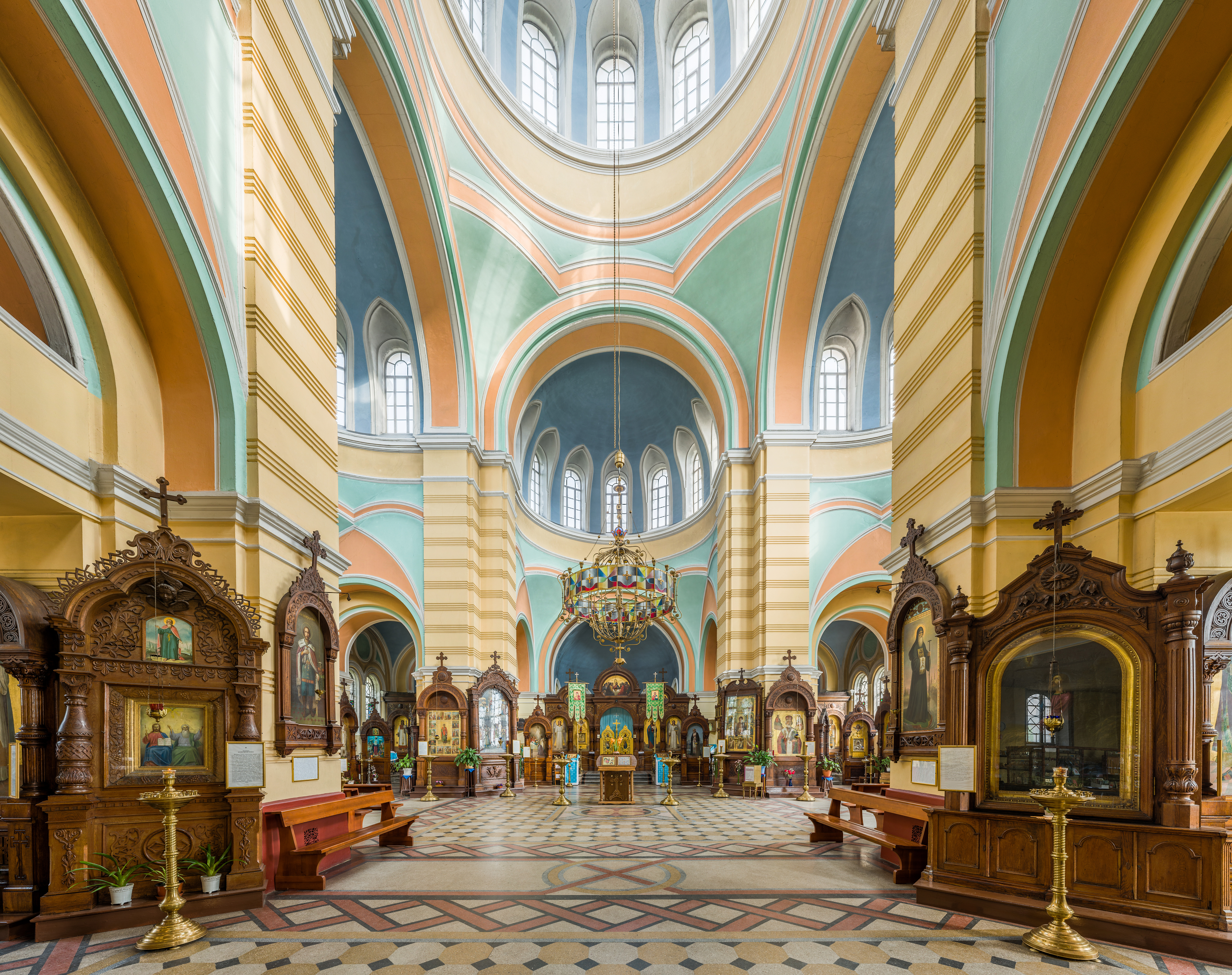
Interior

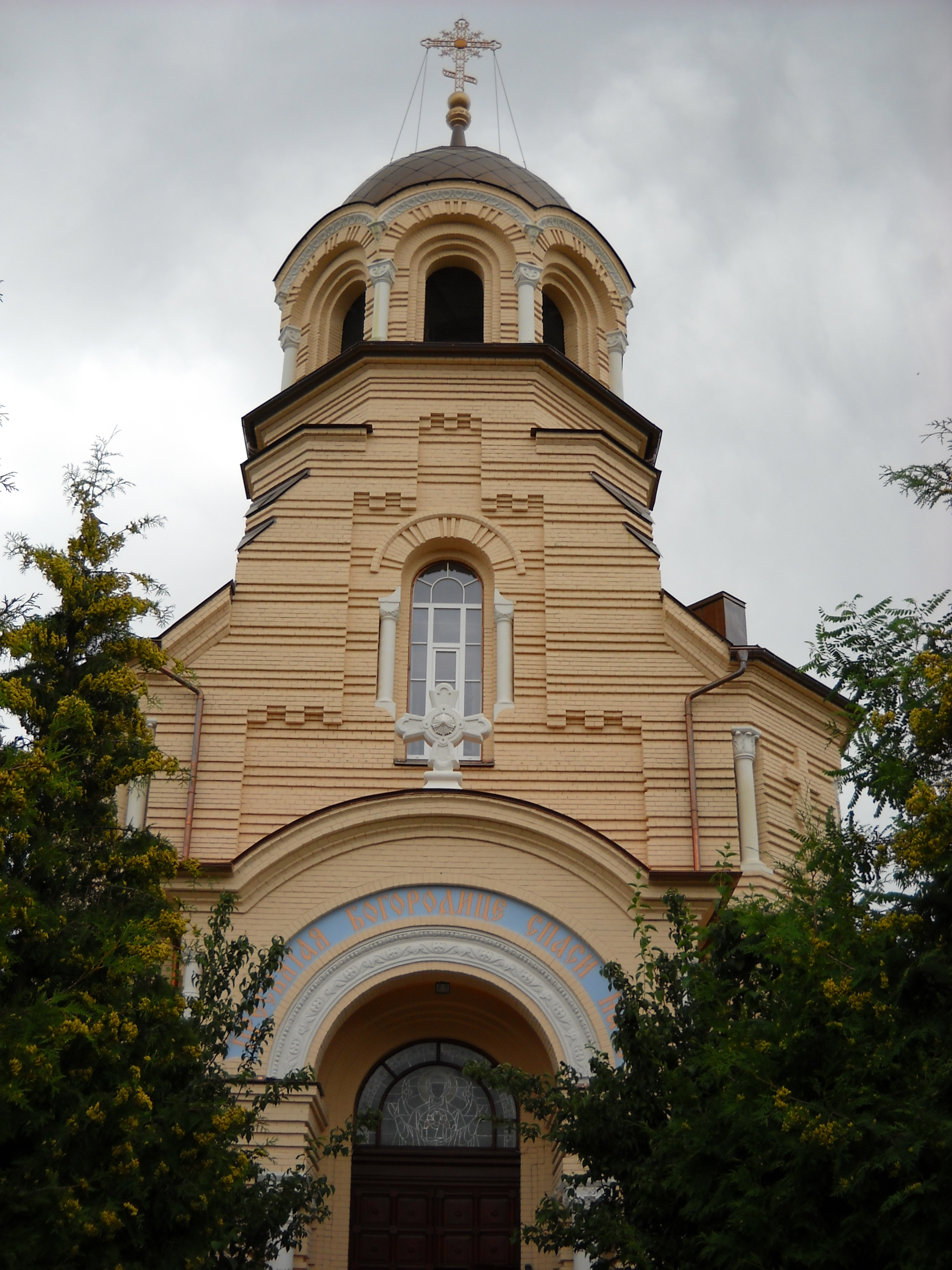
Facade

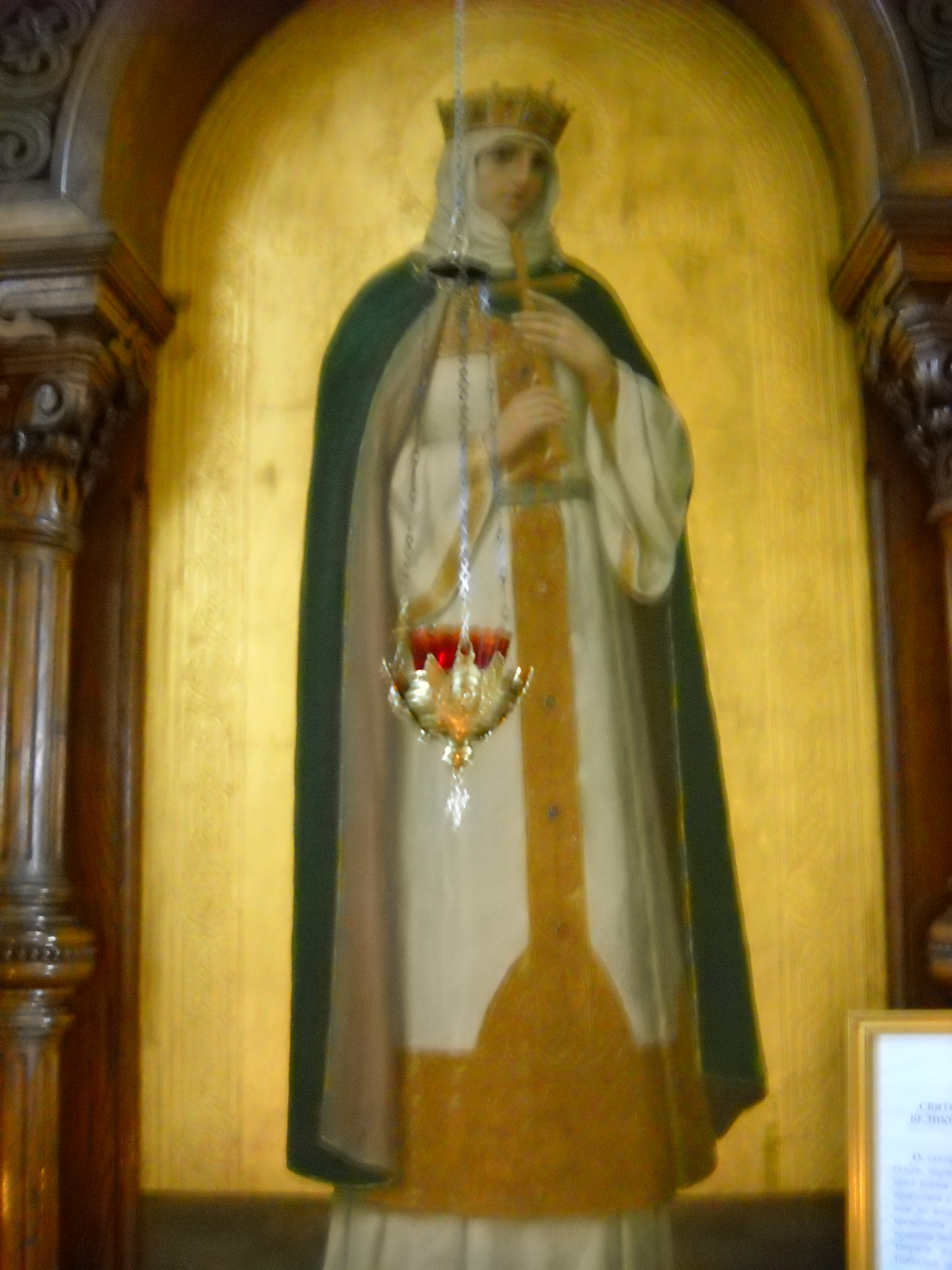
St. Olga icon

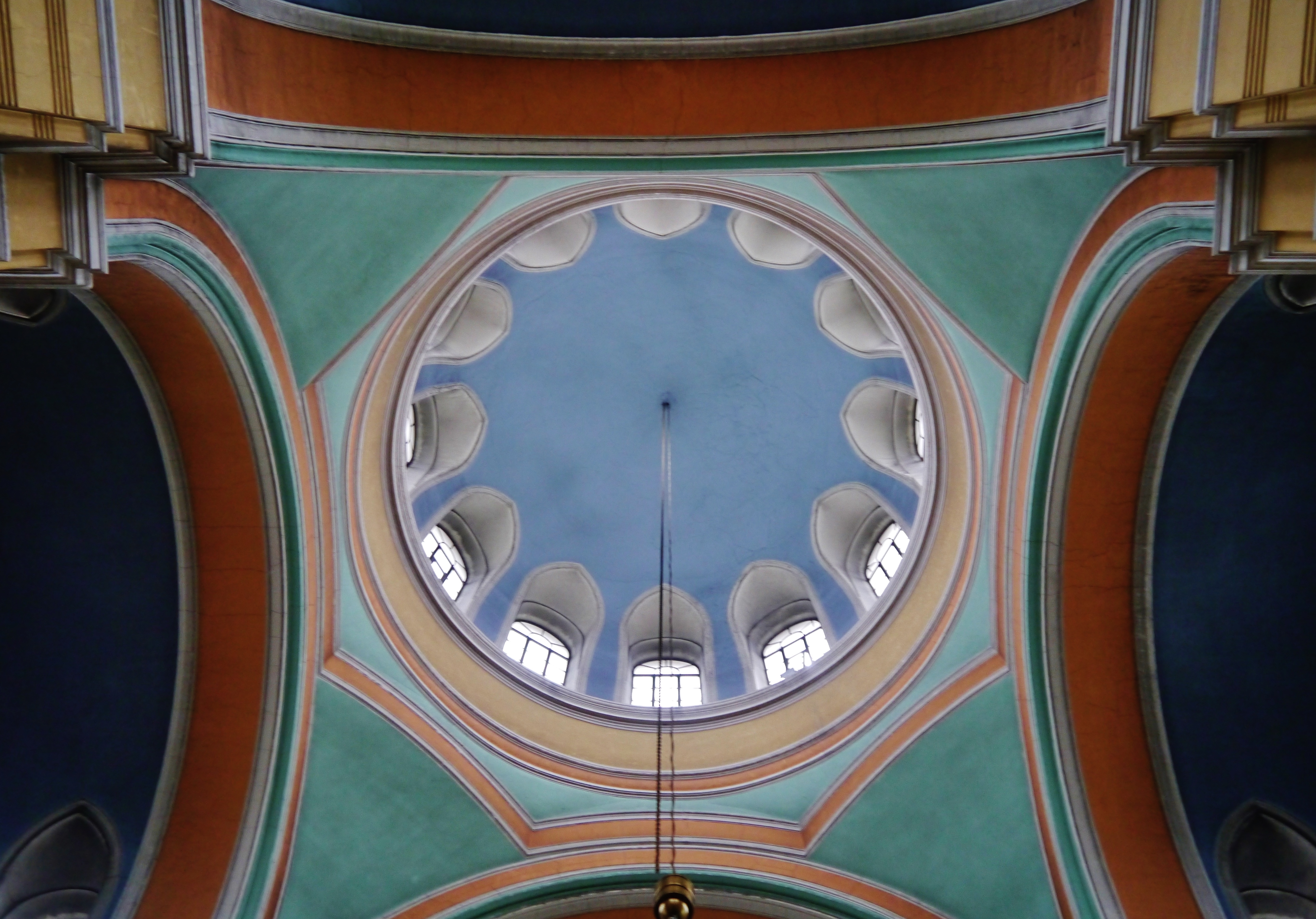
Dome

== See also ==
- Neo-Byzantine architecture in the Russian Empire
- Churches in Vilnius

== Sources ==
- G. Shlevis, Православные храмы Литвы, Vilnius 2006
