= Visim =

Visim Висим
- Selo
- Location within Perm Krai Location within Russia
- Coordinates: 58°39′N 56°13′E
- Country: Russia
- Region: Perm Krai
- District: Dobryansky District
- Time zone: UTC+5:00

Visim (Russian: Висим) is a rural locality (a selo) and the administrative center of Visimskoye Rural Settlement, Dobryansky District, Perm Krai, Russia. The population was 164 as of 2010. There are 11 streets.

== Geography ==
Visim is located 34 km north of Dobryanka (the district's administrative centre) by road. Olkhovka is the nearest rural locality.
