= Pankovo, Vozhegodsky District, Vologda Oblast =

Pankovo Паньково
- Village
- Location within Vologda Oblast Location within Russia
- Coordinates: 60°24′N 39°26′E
- Country: Russia
- Region: Vologda Oblast
- District: Vozhegodsky District
- Time zone: UTC+3:00

Pankovo (Russian: Паньково) is a rural locality (a village) in Beketovskoye Rural Settlement, Vozhegodsky District, Vologda Oblast, Russia. The population was 3 as of 2002.

== Geography ==
Pankovo is located 67 km southwest of Vozhega (the district's administrative centre) by road. Syrnevo is the nearest rural locality.
