= Pankovo, Mezhdurechensky District, Vologda Oblast =

Pankovo Паньково
- Village
- Location within Vologda Oblast Location within Russia
- Coordinates: 59°20′N 40°57′E
- Country: Russia
- Region: Vologda Oblast
- District: Mezhdurechensky District
- Time zone: UTC+3:00

Pankovo (Russian: Паньково) is a rural locality (a village) in Sukhonskoye Rural Settlement, Mezhdurechensky District, Vologda Oblast, Russia. The population was 16 as of 2002.

== Geography ==
Pankovo is located 5 km southwest of Shuyskoye (the district's administrative centre) by road. Ishkovo is the nearest rural locality.
