= Yershovka =

Yershovka Ершовка
- Village
- Location within Perm Krai Location within Russia
- Coordinates: 58°31′N 56°09′E
- Country: Russia
- Region: Perm Krai
- District: Dobryansky District
- Time zone: UTC+5:00

Yershovka (Russian: Ершовка) is a rural locality (a village) in Dobryansky District, Perm Krai, Russia. The population was 2 as of 2010. There are 3 streets.

== Geography ==
Yershovka is located 49 km northwest of Dobryanka (the district's administrative centre) by road. Ust-Garevaya is the nearest rural locality.
