= Voznesenka, Uchalinsky District, Republic of Bashkortostan =

Voznesenka Вознесенка
- Selo
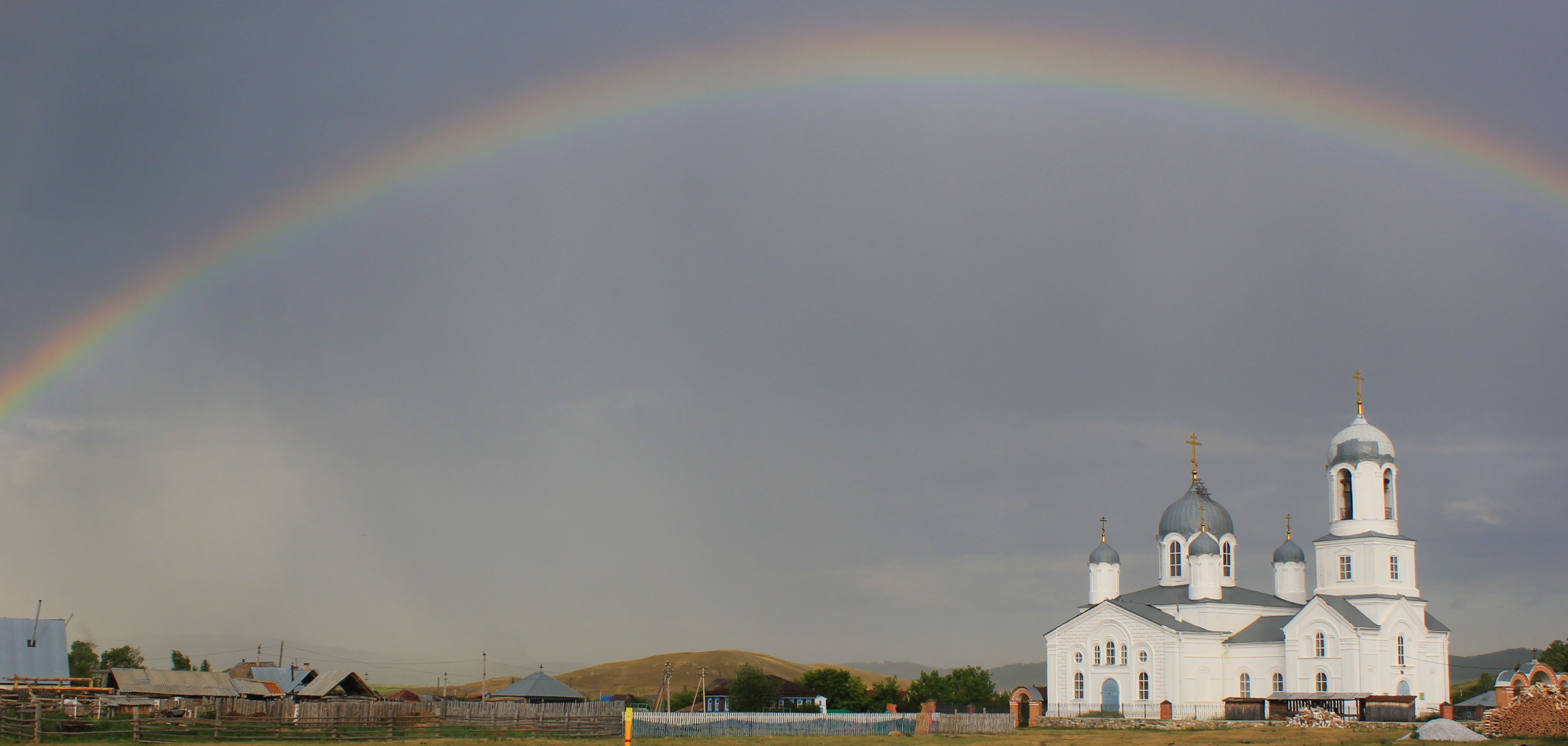

- Location within Bashkortostan Location within Russia
- Coordinates: 54°38′N 59°35′E
- Country: Russia
- Region: Bashkortostan
- District: Uchalinsky District
- Time zone: UTC+5:00

Voznesenka (Russian: Вознесенка) is a rural locality (a selo) in Polyakovsky Selsoviet, Uchalinsky District, Bashkortostan, Russia. The population was 410 as of 2010. There are 8 streets.

== Geography ==
Voznesenka is located 55 km northeast of Uchaly (the district's administrative centre) by road. Absalyamovo is the nearest rural locality.
