= Yelovsky District =

Yelovsky District Еловский район (Russian)
- District
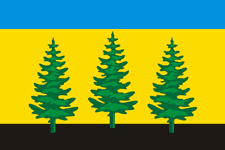
- Flag Coat of arms
- Location of Yelovsky District in Perm Krai
- Coordinates: 56.918°N 54.947°E
- Country: Russia
- Federal subject: Perm Krai
- Established: January 15, 1924
- Administrative center: Yelovo

Area
  - Total: 1,449 km^{2} (559 sq mi)

Population (2010 Census)
  - Total: 10,743
  - Density: 7.414/km^{2} (19.20/sq mi)
  - Urban: 0%
  - Rural: 100%

Administrative structure
  - Inhabited localities: 39 rural localities

Municipal structure
  - Municipally incorporated as: Yelovsky Municipal District
  - Municipal divisions: 0 urban settlements, 5 rural settlements
- Time zone: UTC+5 (MSK+2)
- OKTMO ID: 57618000
- Website: http://adminelovo.ru/

Yelovsky District (Russian: Ело́вский райо́н) is an administrative district (raion) of Perm Krai, Russia; one of the thirty-three in the krai. As a municipal division, it is incorporated as Yelovsky Municipal District. It is located in the southwest of the krai. The area of the district is 1,449 square kilometers (559 sq mi). Its administrative center is the rural locality (a selo) of Yelovo. Population: 10,743 (2010 census); 13,121 (2002 census); 14,127 (1989 Soviet census). The population of Yelovo accounts for 49.7% of the district's total population.

== History ==
The district was established on January 15, 1924.

== Demographics ==
The most numerous ethnic groups, according to the 2002 Census, include Russians at 94.1% and the Chuvash people at 2.6%.

== Sources ==
- Законодательное собрание Пермской области. Закон №416-67 от 28 февраля 1996 г. «Об административно-территориальном устройстве Пермского края», в ред. Закона №504-ПК от 9 июля 2015 г. «О внесении изменений в Закон Пермской области "Об административно-территориальном устройстве Пермского края"». Вступил в силу с момента опубликования. Опубликован: "Звезда", №38, 12 марта 1996 г. (Legislative Assembly of Perm Oblast. Law #416-67 of February 28, 1996 On the Administrative-Territorial Structure of Perm Krai, as amended by the Law #504-PK of July 9, 2015 On Amending the Law of Perm Oblast "On the Administrative-Territorial Structure of Perm Krai". Effective as of the moment of publication.).
- Законодательное собрание Пермской области. Закон №1761-364 от 10 ноября 2004 г. «Об утверждении границ и о наделении статусом муниципальных образований Еловского района Пермского края», в ред. Закона №175-ПК от 7 марта 2013 г. «О внесении изменений в отдельные Законы Пермской области, Коми-Пермяцкого автономного округа об утверждении границ и о наделении статусом муниципальных образований Пермского края». Вступил в силу через десять дней со дня официального опубликования. Опубликован: "Бюллетень Законодательного Собрания и администрации Пермской области", №12, I часть, 9 декабря 2004 г. (Legislative Assembly of Perm Oblast. Law #1761-364 of November 10, 2004 On Establishing the Borders and on Granting the Status to the Municipal Formations of Yelovsky District of Perm Krai, as amended by the Law #175-PK of March 7, 2013 On Amending Various Laws of Perm Oblast, Komi-Permyak Autonomous Okrug on Establishing the Borders and on Granting the Status to the Municipal Formations of Perm Krai. Effective as of the day which is ten days following the day of the official publication.).
