= Yelovo, Perm Krai =

Yelovo Елово
- Selo
- Interactive map of Yelovo
- Location of Yelovo Yelovo (Perm Krai)
- Coordinates: 57°03′00″N 54°55′30″E
- Country: Russia
- Federal subject: Perm Krai
- Administrative district: Yelovsky District

Population (2010 Census)
  - Total: 5,334
  - Estimate (2021): 4,844 (−9.2%)

Administrative status
  - Capital of: Yelovsky District
- Time zone: UTC+5 (MSK+2)
- OKTMO ID: 57618407101

Yelovo (Russian: Елово) is a rural locality (a selo) and the administrative center of Yelovsky District of Perm Krai, Russia, located on the banks of the Votkinsk Reservoir. Population: 5,334 (2010 census); 5,712 (2002 census); 5,612 (1989 Soviet census).
