= List of Tbilisi Metro stations =

The following is a list of the 23 stations of the Tbilisi Metro, in Tbilisi, Georgia.

Current Lines

No.	Name	Opened	Length	Stations
1	Akhmeteli–Varketili Line	1966	19.6 km (12.2 mi)	16
2	Saburtalo Line	1979	7.7 km (4.8 mi)	7
TOTAL:			27.3 km (17.0 mi)	23

== Akhmeteli-Varketili Line (First Line) ==
- Varketili (Georgian: ვარკეთილი), literally meaning "I'm kind", is a city suburb to which the station serve
- Samgori (სამგორი), literally "three hills", named after the district where the metro station is located.
- Isani (ისანი), named after the district where the metro station is located. The word "Isani" is of Arab etymology, meaning "a stronghold".
- 300 Aragveli Samasi Aragveli (300 არაგველი), named in honor to the 300 soldiers from the Aragvi River valley who fell, defending Tbilisi against the Persians in 1795.
- Avlabari (ავლაბარი), bears the name of the historic district of Tbilisi where the metro station is situated. Formerly known as 26 Komisari after the 26 Baku Commissars. The Arab-derived place name "Avlabari" is literally translated as "an area beyond the wall".
- Liberty Square (თავისუფლების მოედანი Tavisuplebis Moedani), named after the city's central square to which the station serves. Formerly known as Leninis Moedani (Lenin Square) after Vladimir Lenin.
- Rustaveli (რუსთაველი), named after famous medieval Georgian poet Shota Rustaveli. The Station is located next to the Shota Rustaveli statue, which is located at the end of Rustaveli Avenue, the city's main thoroughfare.
- Marjanishvili (მარჯანიშვილი), located on the street and on the square named after Konstantine Marjanishvili, 1872-1933, a prominent Georgian theater director and playwright.
- Station Square 1 (სადგურის მოედანი 1 Sadguris Moedani 1), a square where the Central Railway Station is located, transfer station to Saburtalo Line.
- Nadzaladevi (ნაძალადევი), named after the district where the station is located. Formerly known as Oktomberi (October) after the October Revolution. "Nadzaladevi" (literally, "taken by force") was a name given to the area along the railway occupied by the workers, in the 1880s, despite the official ban. This district was also known as Nakhalovka (Russian: Нахаловка), a name which has survived in common speech to this day.
- Gotsiridze (გოცირიძე), named after the metro engineer Viktor Gotsiridze. Formerly called Elektrodepo (ელექტროდეპო) (lit. "The Electro-Depot") after nearby No.1 Metro Depot of Nadzaladevi.
- Didube (დიდუბე), named after the district to which the station serves. The name Didube itself means "a large plain".
- Ghrmaghele (ღრმაღელე), named after the suburb where the station is located. The name is literally translated as "a deep spring".
- Guramishvili (გურამიშვილი), named so after the poet Davit Guramishvili, 1705-1792. The Station itself is located on the avenue named after Davit Guramishvili.
- Sarajishvili (სარაჯიშვილი), named after the philanthropist David Sarajishvili, 1848-1911, the avenue named after which is located nearby.
- Akhmeteli Theatre (ახმეტელის თეატრი Akhmet'elis Teat'ri), named so after the theatre director Alexandre Akhmeteli, 1886-1937, who was purged under Joseph Stalin. Formerly known as Gldani after the district to which the station serves.

== Saburtalo Line (Second line) ==
- Station Square 2 (სადგურის მოედანი 2 Sadguris Moedani 2), a square where the Central Railway Station is located, transfer station to Akhmeteli-Varketili Line (First Line).
- Tsereteli (წერეთელი), located on the avenue named after the national poet Akaki Tsereteli (1840-1915).
- Technical University (ტექნიკური უნივერსიტეტი T'eknik'uri Universit'et'i), named after Georgian Technical University, located nearby. Formerly known as Politeknikuri Instituti.
- Medical University (სამედიცინო უნივერსიტეტი Sameditsino Universit'et'i), named after Tbilisi State Medical University, located nearby. It was formerly known as Komkavshiri, i.e. Komsomol.
- Delisi (დელისი), named after the neighbourhood where the metro station is located. The station was shortly known as Gotsiridze (გოცირიძე) after a metro engineer, Viktor Gotsiridze.
- Vazha-Pshavela (ვაჟა-ფშაველა), located on the avenue named after the poet Vazha-Pshavela (1861-1915). The station is almost right under Vazha-Pshavela statue.
- State University (სახელმწიფო უნივერსიტეტი Sakhelmts'ipo Universit'et'i), named after the nearby located campus of the Tbilisi State University.

== Rustaveli-Vazisubani Line (Third Line) ==
Work on the following stations began but never finished:

- Rustaveli-2 (რუსთაველი-2), a transfer station to the third line.
- Saarbrücken Square (საარბრიუკენის მოედანი), a historic square in the Chughureti district.
- Lower Elia (ქვემო ელია), a neighbourhood also simply referred to as Elia.
- Upper Elia (ზემო ელია), a neighbourhood often referred to as Metromsheni.
- Vazisubani (ვაზისუბანი), the terminus station located in the same named neighbourhood.

The following stations were planned and work never began: Didi Dighomi (დიდი დიღომი), Zurgovana (ზურგოვანა), Georgian Military Road (საქართველოს სამხედრო გზა Sakartvelos Samkhedro Gza), Mioni (მიონი), Dighomi (დიღომი), Didube-2 (დიდუბე-2), "EMMG" (ემმგ), Technical University 2 (ტექნიკური უნივერსიტეტი 2), Vake (ვაკე) followed by the work in progress stations, and then Varketili-2 (ვარკეთილი 2), Kakheti Highway (კახეთის გზატკეცილი K'akhetis Gzat'k'etsili) and Moscow Avenue (მოსკოვის გამზირი).
