= Liberty Square (Tbilisi Metro) =

Liberty Square Metro Station

Liberty Square თავისუფლების მოედანი

General information
- Coordinates: 41°41′41″N 44°47′59″E
- System: Tbilisi Metro station
- Line: Akhmeteli-Varketili Line
- Platforms: Island platform
- Tracks: 2

Construction
- Platform levels: 1

History
- Opened: 6 November 1967
- Rebuilt: 2006

Services
Preceding station	Tbilisi Metro	Following station
Rustaveli towards Akhmetelis Teatri	Akhmeteli–Varketili Line	Avlabari towards Varketili
Location

Liberty Square (Georgian: თავისუფლების მოედანი, romanized: tavisuplebis moedani) is a station of the Tbilisi Metro on the Akhmeteli–Varketili Line. Situated between Rustaveli and Avlabari, Tavisuplebis Moedani is one of the deepest stations of the metro.

The metro station is surrounded by the Galleria Tbilisi (Georgian: გალერია თბილისი) shopping centre which is a multi-level shopping mall featuring a play area, a movie theatre and a food court.

It is located close to Freedom Square at the southern end of Rustaveli Avenue. The station was opened on 6 November 1967 to extend the original Rustaveli–Didube line. Before 1991, it was named Lenin Square (ლენინის მოედანი). The station was renovated in 2006.

== Architecture ==
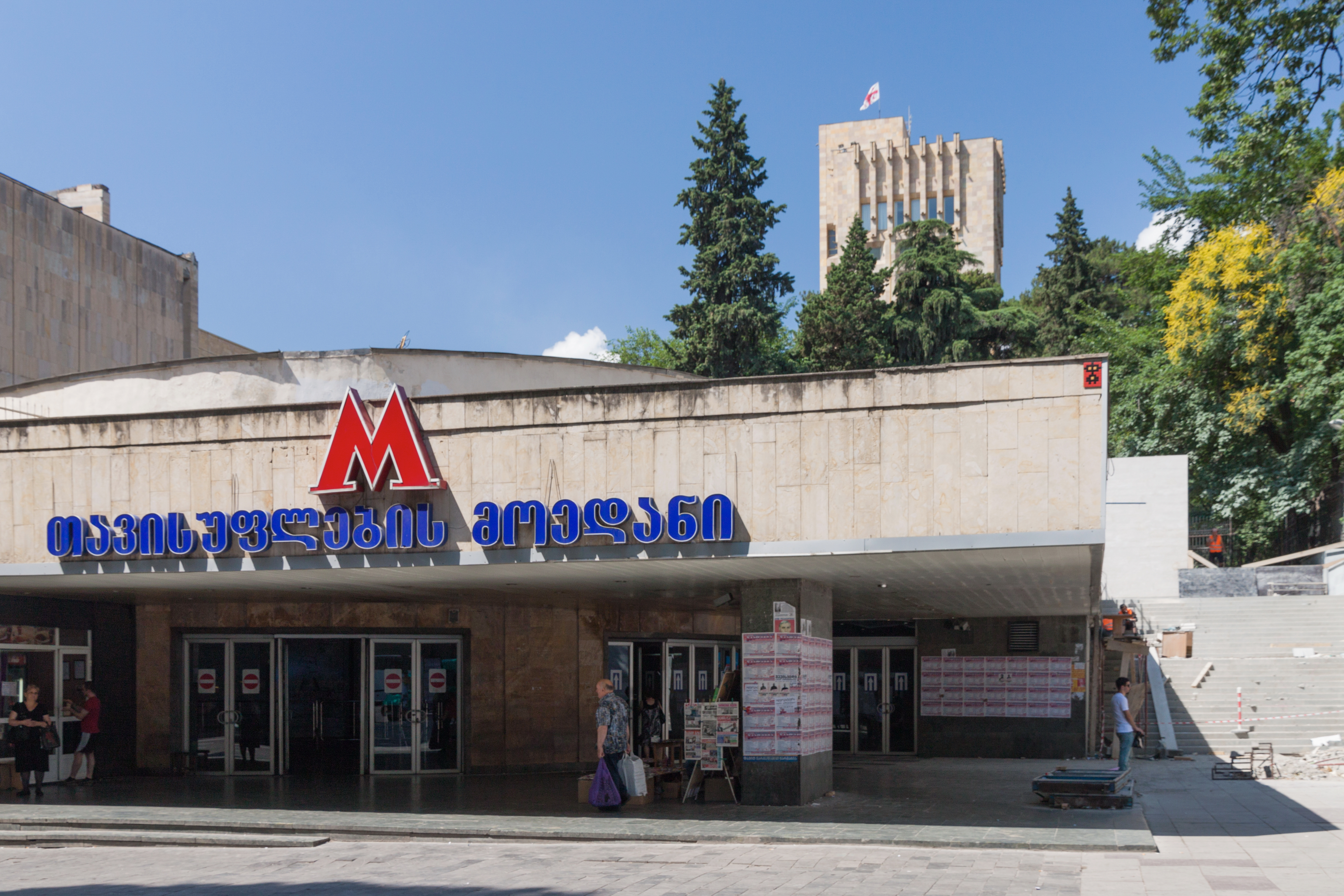
Station entrance before the Galleria Tbilisi (formerly known as Univermaghi "Tbilisi" Georgian: უნივერმაღი "თბილისი") renovations.

The original above-ground pavilion was part of the "Tbilisi" department store complex. The underground station, which is connected to the upper vestibule by an escalator, is a row of columns covered with white marble; The roof is vaulted. Red marble tiles are laid on the floor.

The station was renovated in 2006. The changes affected its visual side. A new lighting system, advertising billboards and monitors were installed. The communication system was also updated. Red and white colors predominate in the white marble station: in accordance with the composition created from the flag of Georgia and a red rose.

After the demolition of the "Tbilisi" department store and the construction of "Tbilisi Gallery" in its place (2017-2018), the new upper pavilion of the "Freedom Square" metro station (the old one no longer exists) was inside the newly built building.

Freedom Square is one of the deepest stations in the Tbilisi metropolitan area and is a few meters behind Rustaveli.

== Gallery ==
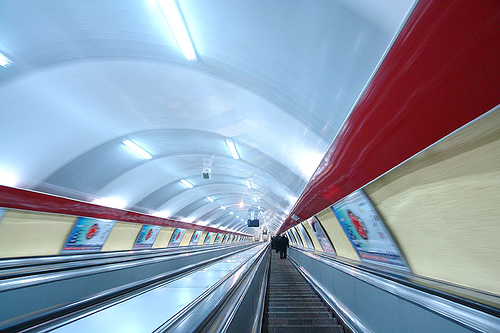

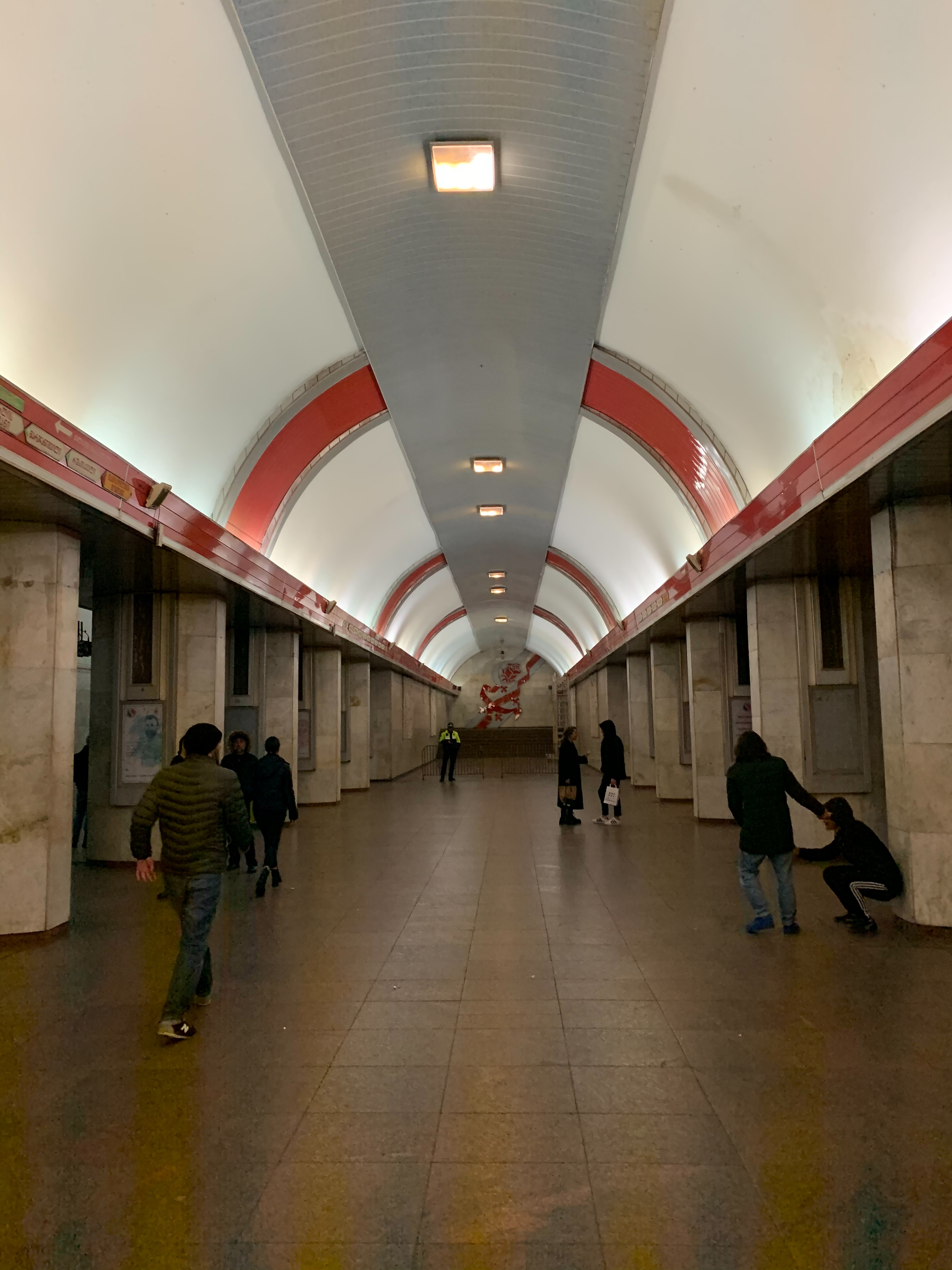

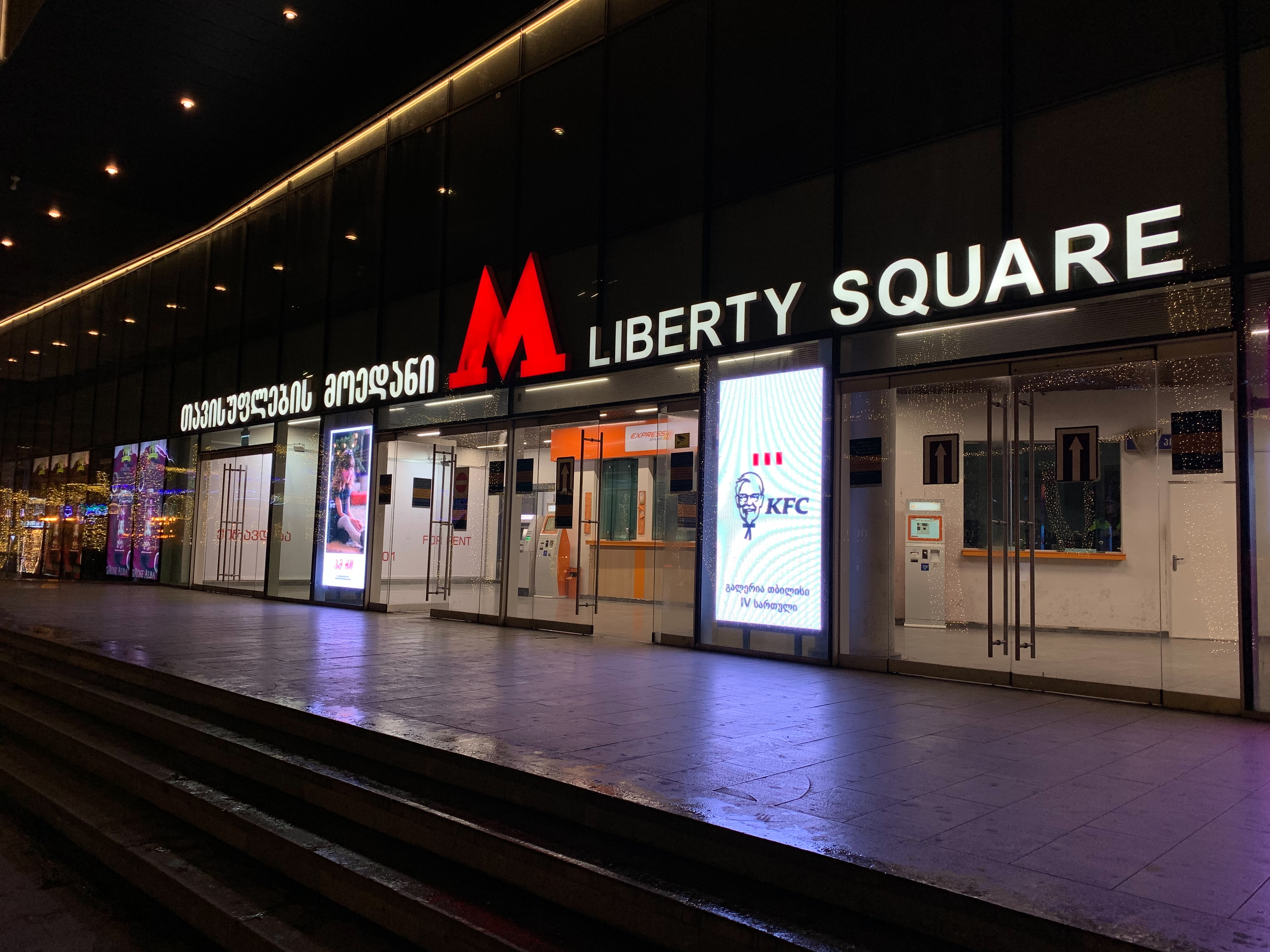

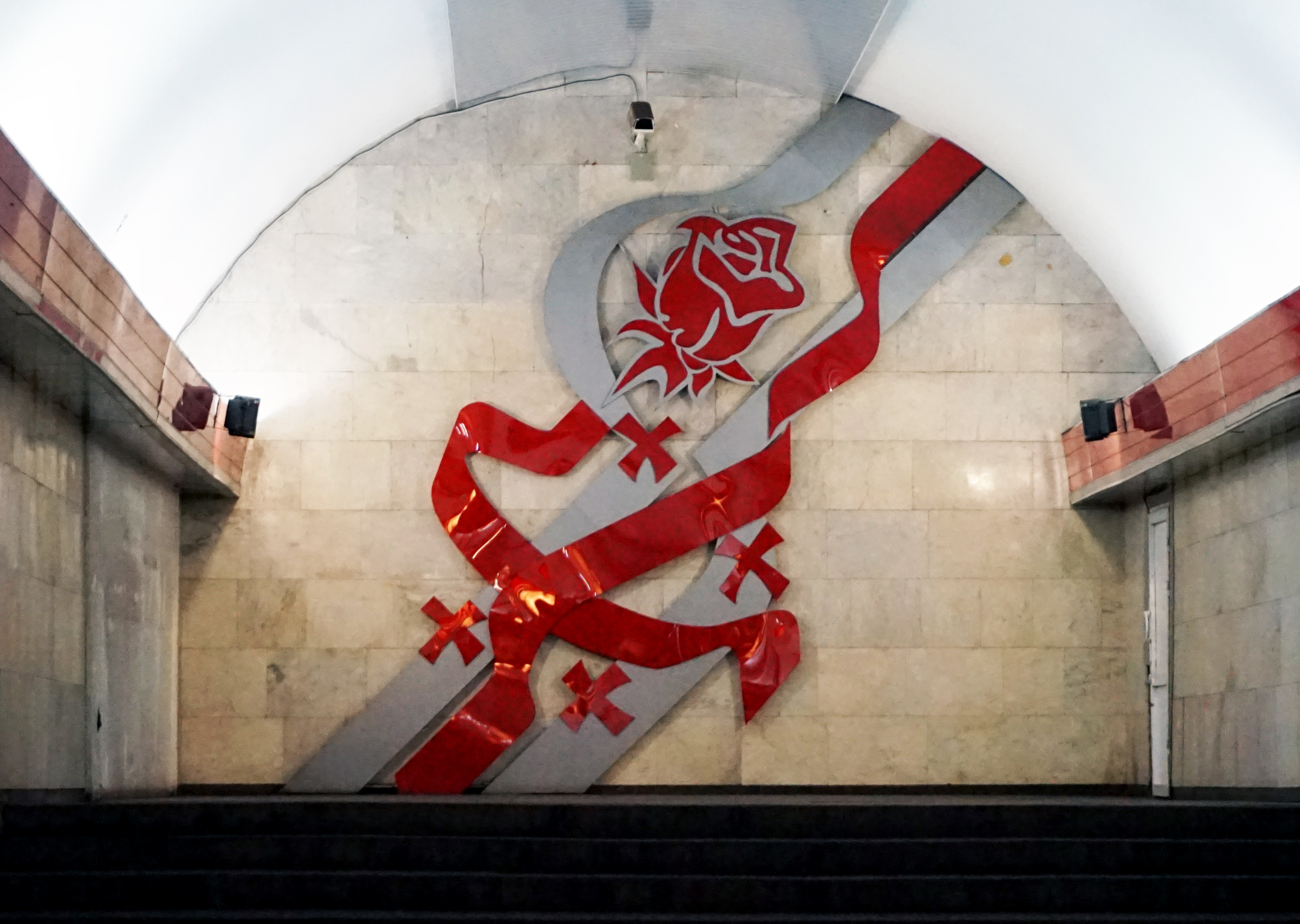

== See also ==
- List of Tbilisi metro stations
