= Rustaveli (Tbilisi Metro) =

Tbilisi Metro Station

Rustaveli რუსთაველი
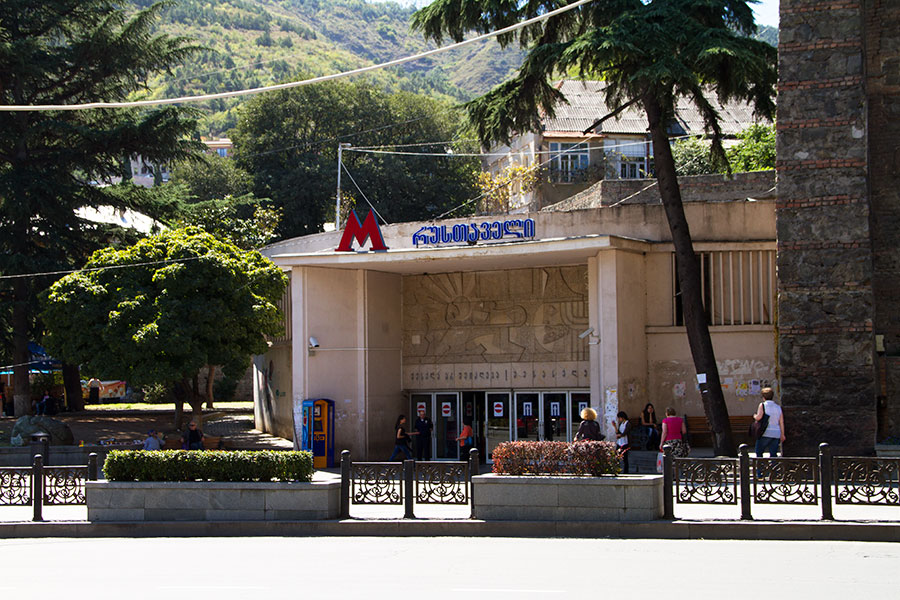
- Entrance vestibule to the metro station

General information
- Location: 2, Merab Kostava Str., Tbilisi, Georgia
- Coordinates: 41°42′13″N 44°47′24″E
- System: Tbilisi Metro station
- Platforms: Island platform
- Tracks: 2

Construction
- Depth: 60 m (197 ft)
- Platform levels: 1

History
- Opened: 11 January 1966; 60 years ago

Services
Preceding station	Tbilisi Metro	Following station
Marjanishvili towards Akhmetelis Teatri	Akhmeteli–Varketili Line	Liberty Square towards Varketili
Location

Rustaveli (Georgian: რუსთაველი) is a station of the Tbilisi Metro on the Akhmeteli–Varketili Line (First Line). It is located at Rustaveli Square at the northern end of Rustaveli Avenue next to the Shota Rustaveli statue. The station was opened on 11 January 1966 as part of the original metro line with six stations, which include stations from Didube to Rustaveli.

The metro station is named after Shota Rustaveli, a great Georgian poet and thinker of the 12th century, the author of The Knight in the Panther's Skin, a Georgian national epic poem.

Located between Tavisuplebis Moedani and Marjanishvili stations, Rustaveli is 60 metres underground, (Note: Alternative sources estimate the depth to be 100 metres) and with an escalator length of 120 meters or 394 feet, making the station the deepest of the Tbilisi metro system and one of the deepest in Europe. Because of this, per some sources, the Rustaveli metro station has the world's 6th longest escalator.

Other attractions and sightseeing near the station include the Georgian National Academy of Sciences, First Republic Square, Rustaveli Avenue, and Tbilisi Concert Hall.

== Architecture ==
The walls and columns of the station are covered with red marble. The metro station is decorated with relief images and depictions of the theme of Shota Rustaveli's epic poem. A frieze on the theme of Shota Rustaveli and The Knight in the Panther's Skin is placed above the entrance of the metro station, the sculptor of which is Elguja Amashukeli. Overall, Rustaveli station can be described as an example of the monumentalist style of the 1960s, with a scent of Georgian minimalism.

The construction was carried out according to the project by O. Kalandarishvili and L. Janelidze.

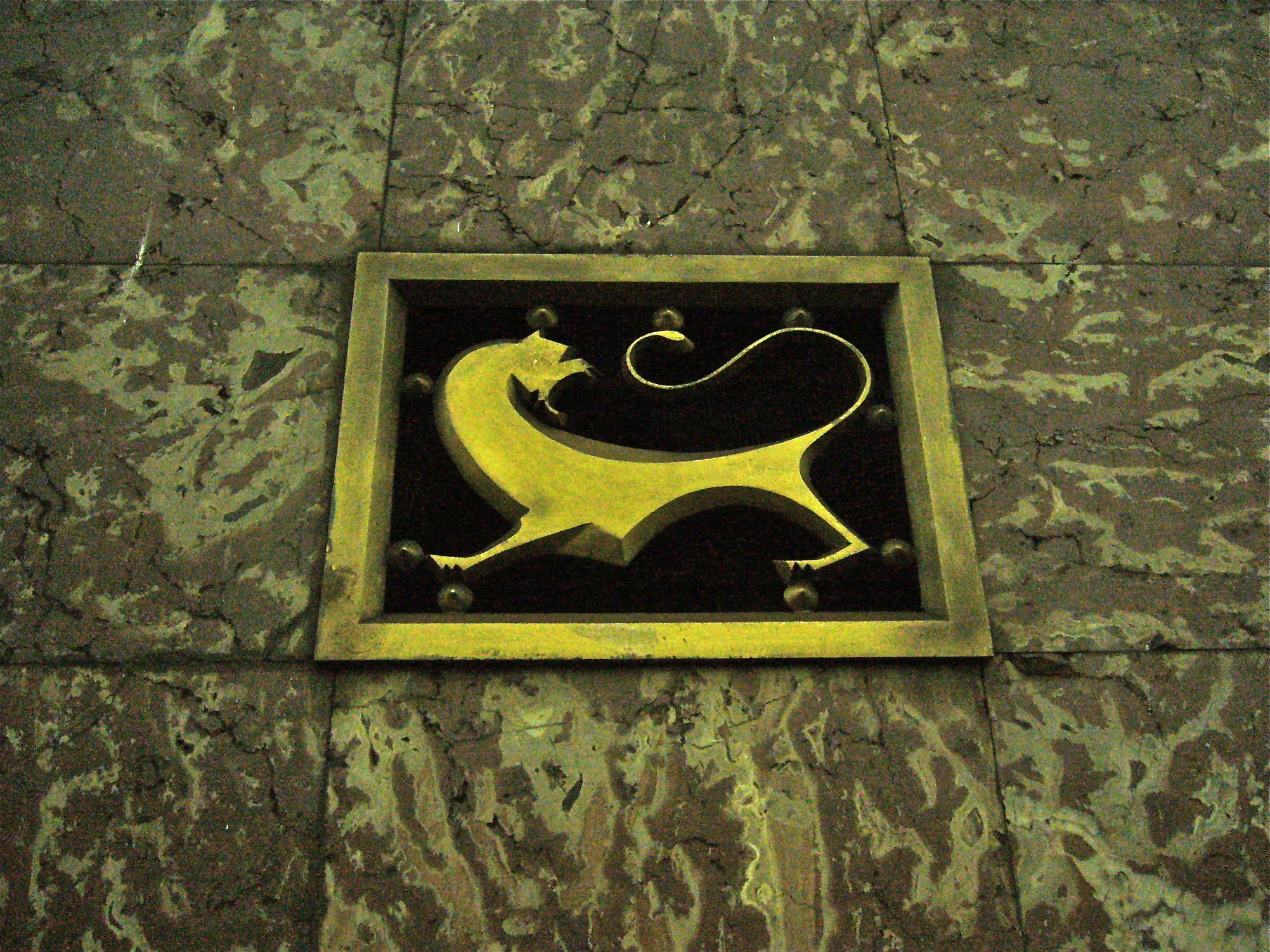

In 2019, some citizens expressed concern that within the regular maintenance and rehabilitation process of the station, the golden-coloured fragments of the tiger on columns of the station made of copper were removed and replaced by its copies. Tbilisi Transport Company explains that the allegations are not true. During the works, the protective netting was replaced, and the aluminum structure itself was cleaned and repainted. The restoration of the tiger image was carried out according to the original project.

A stylized image of a tiger was connected to the frame by a special minimalistic ornamental decor, which made it possible for the whole structure to be firmly attached to the columns with a simple mechanical insertion of the grill, of which mechanical design was allegedly altered.

== Gallery ==
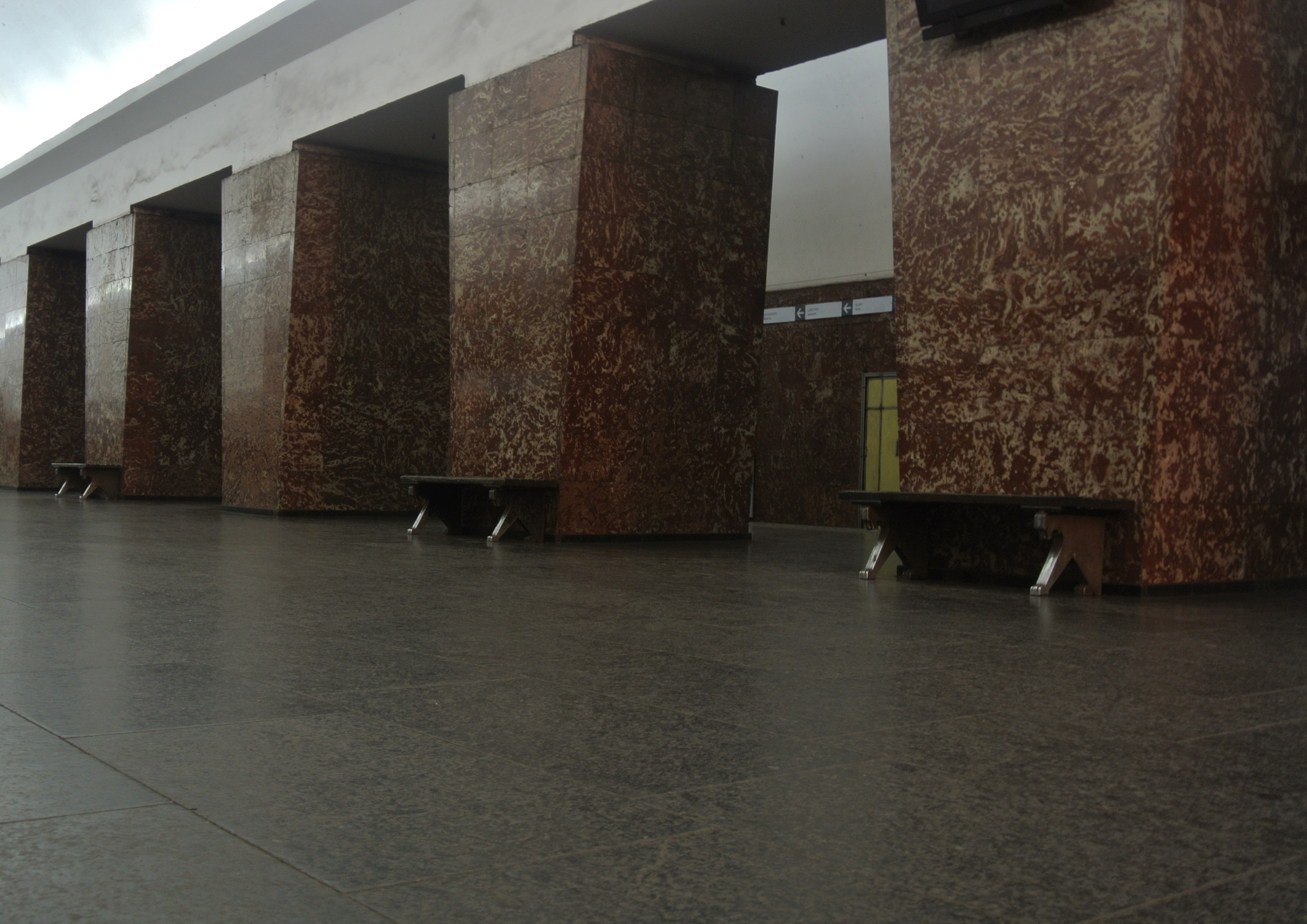
Station hall

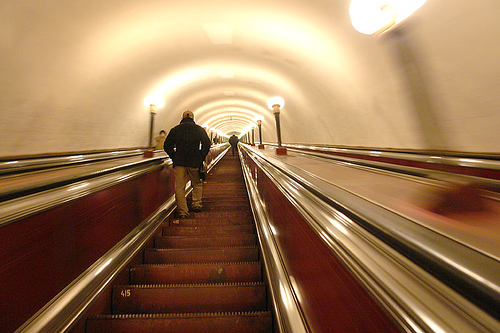
Escalator (Such lamps are currently not used)

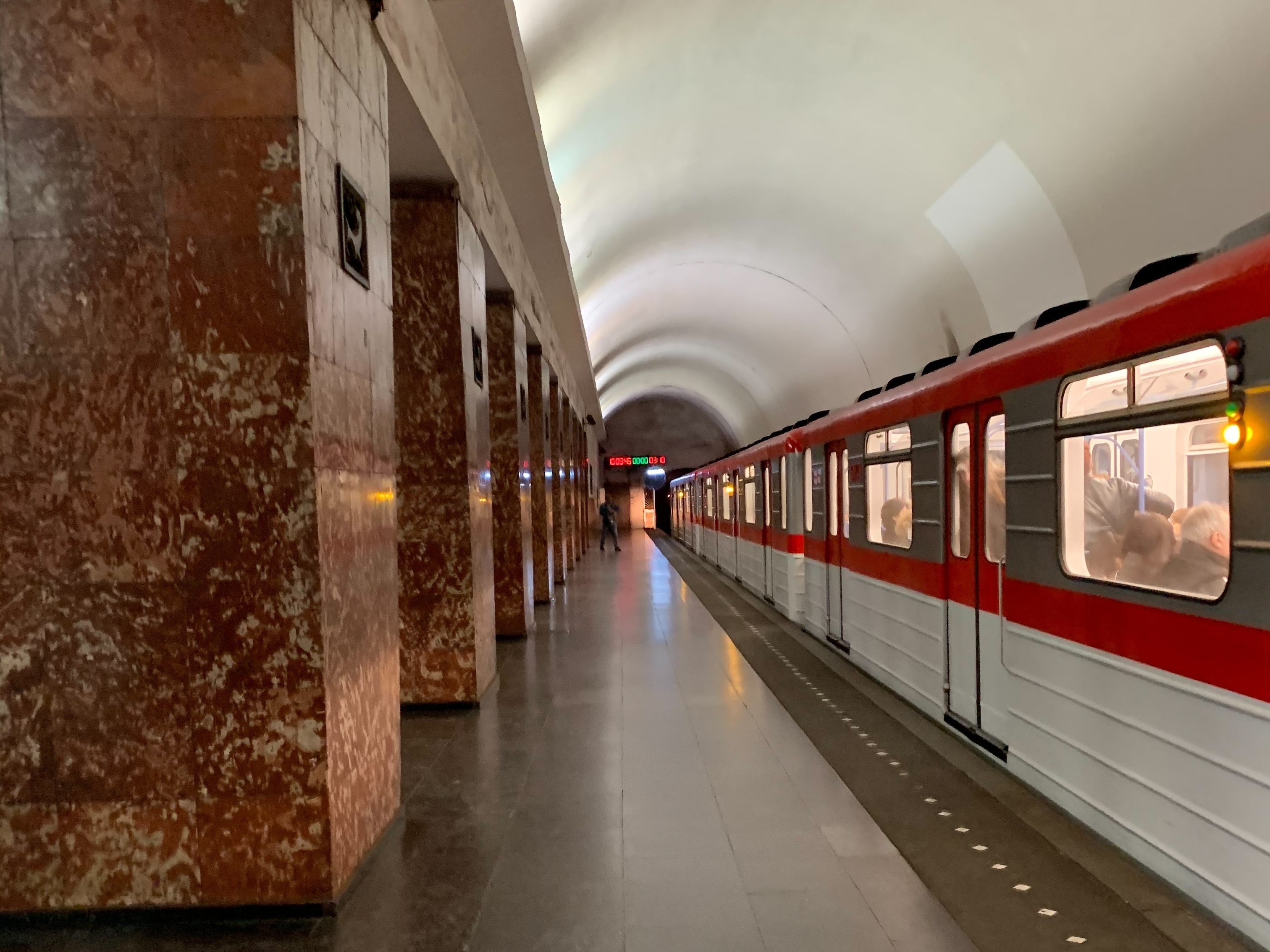
Platform

== Third Line (Rustaveli-Vazisubani Line) ==
According to the plan of the third line of the Tbilisi Metro, Rustaveli station was supposed to become a transfer station, tentatively referred to as the Rustaveli-2 station, the connecting staircase and passage of which exist in the current station. According to the plan, the Rustaveli-2 station of the third line of the Tbilisi Metro would connect the stations in the western direction to Vake and Didi Dighomi, and in the eastern direction to Saarbrücken Square towards Vazisubani and other south-eastern districts of Tbilisi. The first section of the third metro line was supposed to be built from Rustaveli in the direction of Vazisubani (with stations Rustaveli-2, Saarbrücken Square, Kvemo Elia, Zemo Elia (Metromsheni) and Vazisubani). Nowadays, construction works are frozen.

== See also ==
- List of Tbilisi metro stations
