= Marjanishvili (Tbilisi Metro) =

Tbilisi Metro Station

Marjanishvili მარჯანიშვილი

General information
- Location: 89, Davit Aghmashenebeli avenue 24, Kote Marjanishvili street Tbilisi, Georgia
- Coordinates: 41.709625°N 44.797981°E
- System: Tbilisi Metro station
- Line: Akhmeteli–Varketili Line
- Tracks: 2

Construction
- Structure type: Underground

History
- Opened: 11 January 1966; 60 years ago
- Former names: Marjanishvilis Moedani (Marjanishvili Square)

Services
Preceding station	Tbilisi Metro	Following station
Station Square towards Akhmetelis Teatri	Akhmeteli–Varketili Line	Rustaveli towards Varketili
Location

Marjanishvili (Georgian: მარჯანიშვილი Georgian pronunciation: [mardʒaniʃʷili]) is a station of the Tbilisi Metro on the Akhmeteli–Varketili Line (First Line), located between Station Square and Rustaveli stations. It was opened on 11 January 1966 as part of the original metro line with six stations from Didube to Rustaveli. The station is named after Kote Marjanishvili, a Georgian theater director.

The architects of the lower platform of the passenger hall were G. Melkadze, T. Mikashavidze, N. Kvartskhava, and I. Kavlashvili. The construction works were carried out by "Tbilmetromsheni".

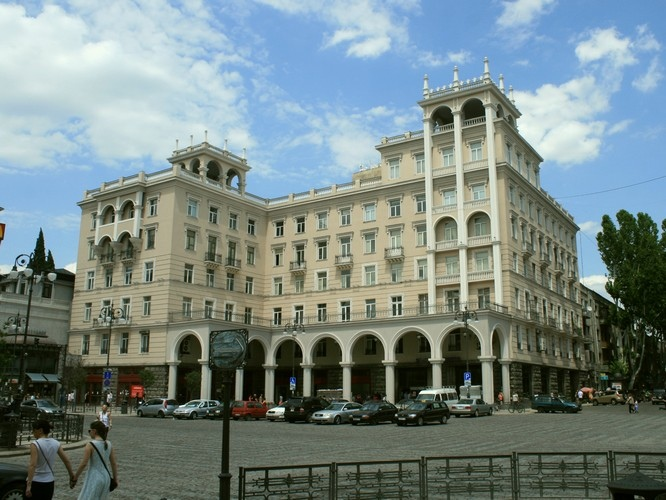
The building on Kote Marjanishvili Square where the metro station entrance is located.

The upper vestibule is built into the building of the Design Institute "Tbilkalakprojekt". The interior is plain, lined with red and gray marble. The underground hall is connected by an escalator, which is the oldest in the metro system (type ЕМ-5.5). Black polished granite floors and gray marble-clad arches are designed to contrast against the white arch and walls of the underground station.

At the end of the waiting hall, there is a high-relief image of the director Kote Marjanishvili's bust on the wall (sculptor Merab Berdzenishvili).

There is also an unopened second exit of the station next to the Marjanishvili Theatre, which construction works began during USSR, but later were frozen.
