= Sarajishvili (Tbilisi Metro) =

Tbilisi Metro Station

Sarajishvili სარაჯიშვილი

General information
- Coordinates: 41.78315°N 44.799053°E
- System: Tbilisi Metro station
- Platforms: Island platform
- Tracks: 2

Construction
- Structure type: Underground

History
- Opened: January 7, 1989
- Former names: Guramishvili

Services
Preceding station	Tbilisi Metro	Following station
Akhmetelis Teatri Terminus	Akhmeteli–Varketili Line	Guramishvili towards Varketili
Location

The Sarajishvili (Georgian: სარაჯიშვილი Georgian pronunciation: [saradʒiʃʷili]) is a station on the Akhmeteli–Varketili Line (First Line) of the Tbilisi Metro. It opened on January 7, 1989. The station is named after the Georgian scientist, entrepreneur, and philanthropist Davit Sarajishvili (1848–1911).

Before 1992, the station was officially named as Guramishvili (Georgian: გურამიშვილი), after the 18th-century Georgian poet David Guramishvili. After 1992, the name of the station was transferred to neighbouring station Guramishvili, pre-1992 known as TEMKA. This is alongside Gotsiridze, one of the occasions when the name of the station changed and previous name transferred to another station.
