= Ghrmaghele (Tbilisi Metro) =

Tbilisi Metro Station

Ghrmaghele ღრმაღელე

General information
- Coordinates: 41.765543°N 44.789869°E
- System: Tbilisi Metro station
- Platforms: Island platform
- Tracks: 2

Construction
- Structure type: Underground

History
- Opened: 28 November 1985

Services
Preceding station	Tbilisi Metro	Following station
Guramishvili towards Akhmetelis Teatri	Akhmeteli–Varketili Line	Didube towards Varketili
Location

The Ghrmaghele or Grmagele (Georgian: ღრმაღელე Georgian pronunciation: [ʁrmaʁele]) is a station on the Akhmeteli–Varketili Line (First Line) of the Tbilisi Metro. It opened on 28 November 1985. It serves the neighbourhood it is named after. In the hall of the station, there are high-relief images created in honor of the metro builders.
