= Isani (Tbilisi Metro) =

Tbilisi Metro Station

Isani ისანი
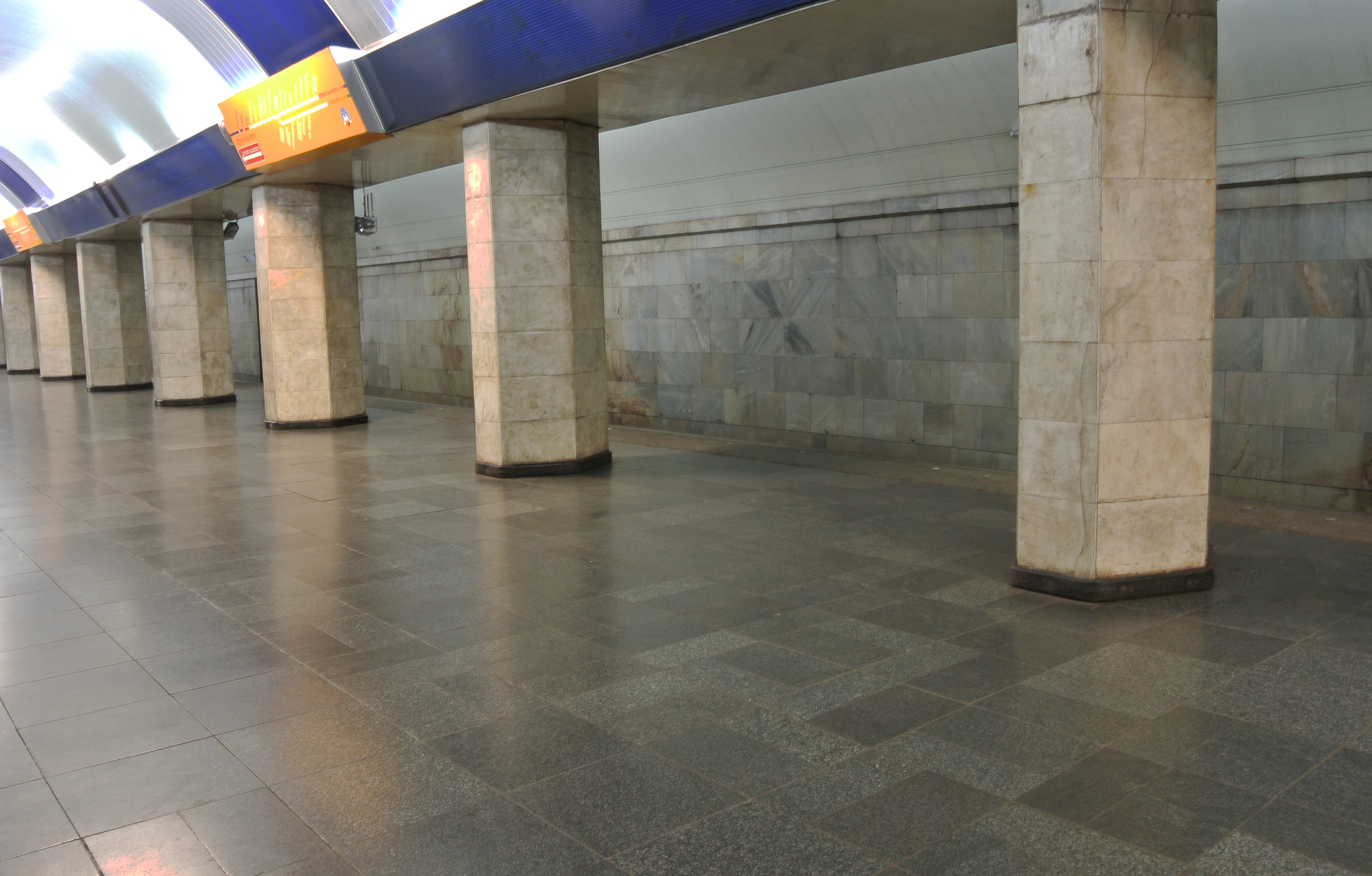

General information
- Location: Tbilisi, Georgia
- Coordinates: 41.68655°N 44.840929°E
- System: Tbilisi Metro station
- Line: Akhmeteli-Varketili Line (First Line)
- Platforms: Island platform
- Tracks: 2

Construction
- Structure type: Underground
- Platform levels: 1

History
- Opened: 5 May 1971

Services
Preceding station	Tbilisi Metro	Following station
Samasi Aragveli towards Akhmetelis Teatri	Akhmeteli–Varketili Line	Samgori towards Varketili
Location

Isani (Georgian: ისანი) is a station on the Akhmeteli–Varketili Line of the Tbilisi metro. The station is named after the neighbourhood and the district it serves.

Opened in 1971 alongside Samgori station, Isani features one of the most prominent architectures with its overground vestibule among Tbilisi metro stations. The upper vestibule features a glass building with an original dome, a prime example of 60s and 70s modernist architecture. The architects of the station were G. Modzmanashvili and N. Lomsadze. The author of the toned panel on the wall of the vestibule is the sculptor S. Koiava.

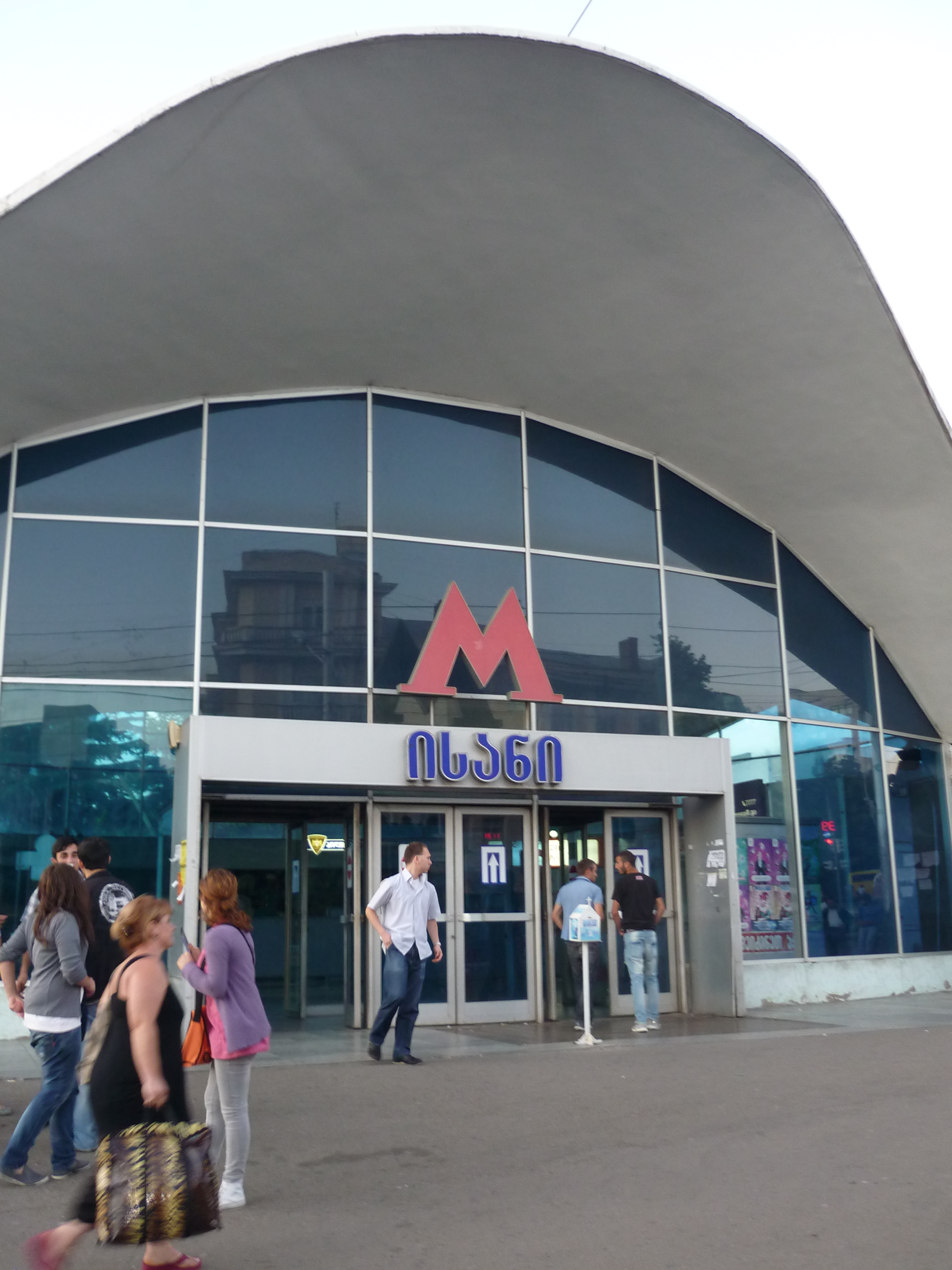
Overground vestibule entrance

The station was renovated in 2006, introducing more blue-shaded glass windows instead of fully transparent ones on the upper vestibule, and somewhat altering its original design and feel. The platform columns of the station are decorated with white marble, and since 2006 the station features blue and white color elements.

Isani metro station is located at the end of Saint Queen Ketevan Martyr Avenue and roughly at the intersection and start of Kakheti Highway. The area surrounding the Isani metro station acts as a transport hub accessing eastern and south-eastern districts and neighbourhoods of Tbilisi, as well as bus routes to Rustavi.
