= Samgori (Tbilisi Metro) =

Tbilisi Metro Station

Samgori სამგორი
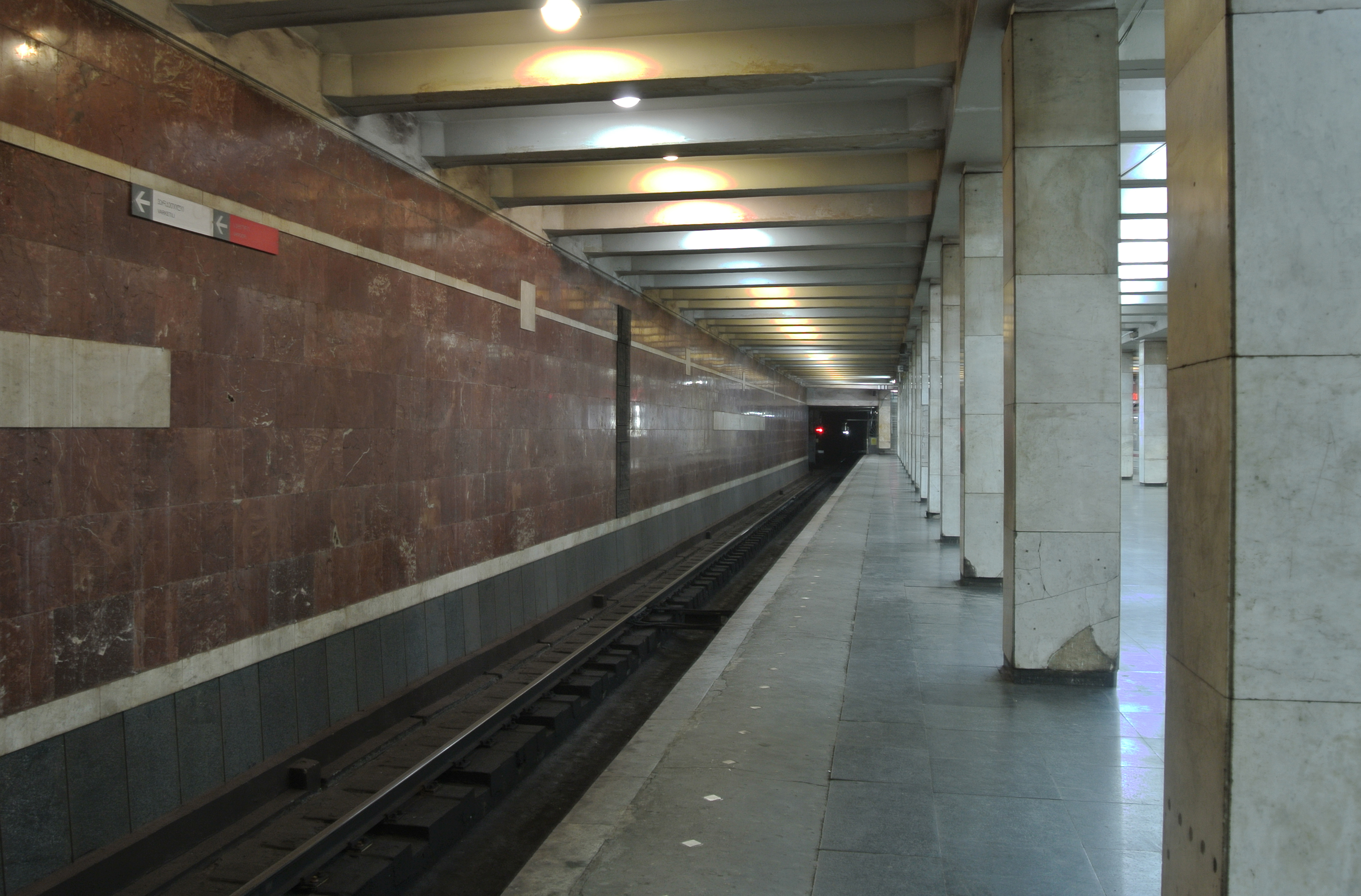

General information
- Coordinates: 41.685621°N 44.854474°E
- System: Tbilisi Metro station
- Line: Akhmeteli Theatre–Varketili Line
- Platforms: Island platform
- Tracks: 2

History
- Opened: 5 May 1971

Services
Preceding station	Tbilisi Metro	Following station
Isani towards Akhmetelis Teatri	Akhmeteli–Varketili Line	Varketili Terminus
Services at nearby railway station
Preceding station	Georgian Railway	Following station
Tbilisi Terminus	Zugdidi – Gardabani	Veli towards Gardabani
Tbilisi Terminus	Tbilisi – Sadakhlo	Ponichala towards Sadakhlo
Tbilisi Terminus	Tbilisi – Dedoplistsqaro	Kachreti towards Dedoplistsqaro
Tbilisi Terminus	Tbilisi – Tbilisi Airport	Tbilisi Airport Terminus
International service
Tbilisi Terminus	Kars–Gyumri–Tbilisi	Ponichala towards Kars, Turkey
Location

Samgori (Georgian: სამგორი) is a station of the Tbilisi Metro on the Akhmeteli–Varketili Line (First Line) situated between Isani and Varketili stations. It serves the district and the neighbourhood it is named after. Next to the station is the Tbilisi junction station of the same name of Samgori (alternatively called Navtlughi). The Samgori metro station has two main entrances, the one from Moscow ave and the one from Kakheti highway, connected with a tunnel that until the 90s had a travelator. The station walls are decorated with relief images. The station was opened on 5 May 1971 as an extension of the Didube–300 Aragveli line.
