= Isani =

Isani may refer to:

== Places ==
- Isani District, an administrative district of Tbilisi, Georgia
- Isani, a neighbourhood of Tbilisi, Georgia, served by Isani (Tbilisi Metro)

== People ==
- Usman Ali Isani (born 1934), Pakistani bureaucrat, educationist and philatelist
- Isani Vaghela (born 2006), American cricketer

== Transport ==
- Isani (Tbilisi Metro), a station on the Tbilisi Metro in Georgia

== See also ==
- Isani-Samgori District, a former administrative district of Tbilisi, Georgia
- 2017 Isani flat siege, a confrontation in Tbilisi's Isani district
- ISNI, International Standard Name Identifier
