= Avlabari (Tbilisi Metro) =

Tbilisi Metro Station

Avlabari ავლაბარი

General information
- Coordinates: 41.692335°N 44.815094°E
- System: Tbilisi Metro station
- Platforms: Island platform
- Tracks: 2

Construction
- Platform levels: 1

History
- Opened: 6 November 1967
- Former names: 26 Komisari

Services
Preceding station	Tbilisi Metro	Following station
Liberty Square towards Akhmetelis Teatri	Akhmeteli–Varketili Line	Samasi Aragveli towards Varketili
Location

Avlabari (Georgian: ავლაბარი) is a station of the Tbilisi Metro on the Akhmeteli–Varketili Line.

The station was opened in November 1967 as a part of the second stretch of the Tbilisi Metro which connected Lenin Square (currently Freedom Square) and 300 Aragveli stations. The station was formerly named 26 Komisari (Georgian: 26 კომისარი) after the 26 Baku Commissars. It was renamed in 1992 after the neighbourhood in Tbilisi, where the station is located.

Architects are S. Revishvili, Sh. Chachanidze, artist Z. Lezhava. Construction works were carried out by "Tbilmetromshen".

The vestibule is connected to the lower station by an escalator. The underground hall is covered with a vault supported by piers covered with black marble.

In 2006, the station was renovated, which was completed on September 4. During the works, its upper vestibule, inclined tunnel and waiting hall were renovated. Technical works were also carried out, during which advertising billboards and monitors were installed.
