= Nadzaladevi (Tbilisi Metro) =

Tbilisi Metro Station

Nadzaladevi ნაძალადევი
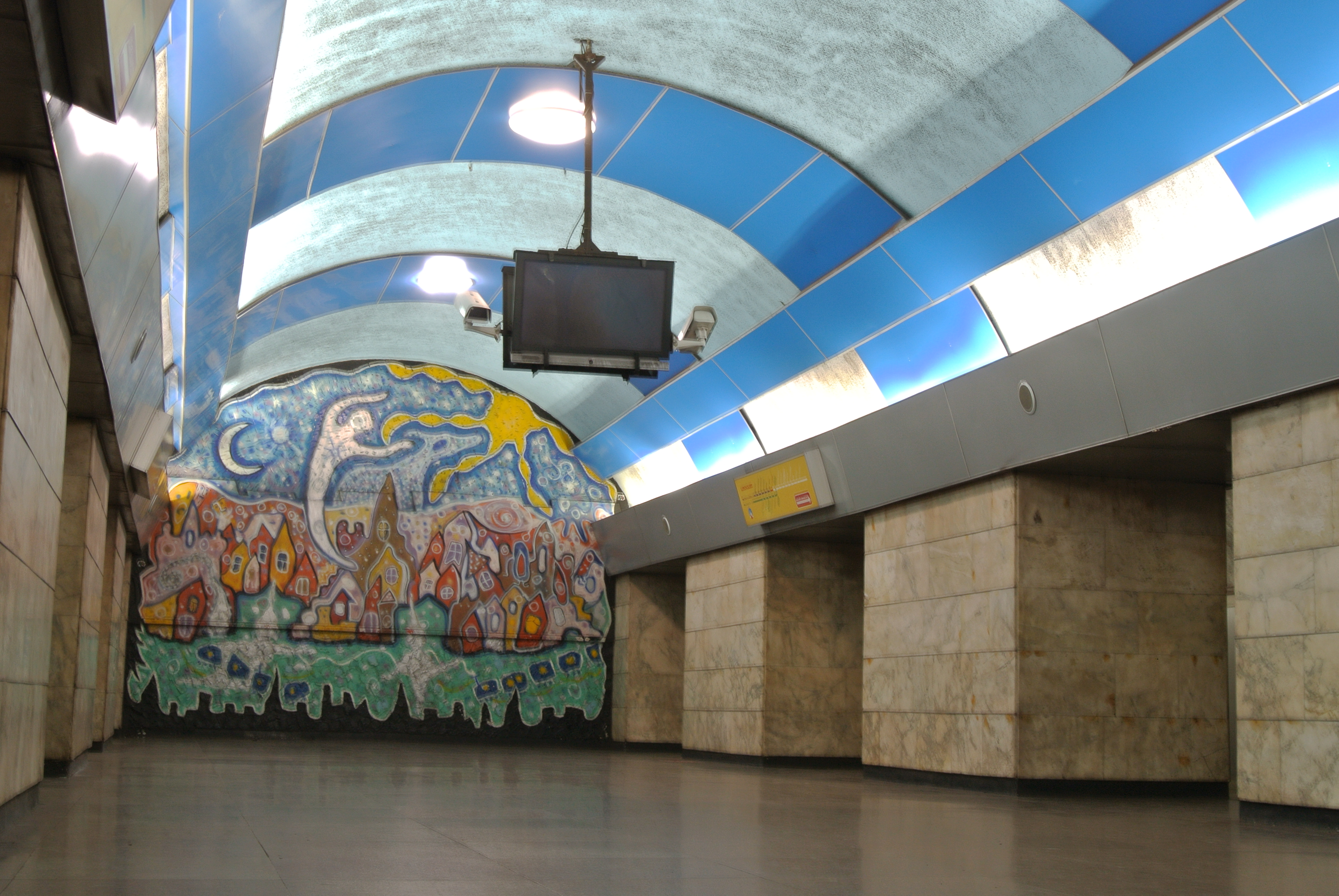
- Station Hall

General information
- Location: Tsotne Dadiani Street
- Coordinates: 41.730094°N 44.796222°E
- System: Tbilisi Metro station
- Owner: Tbilisi Metro
- Tracks: 2

Construction
- Structure type: Underground

History
- Opened: 11 January 1966

Services
Preceding station	Tbilisi Metro	Following station
Gotsiridze towards Akhmetelis Teatri	Akhmeteli–Varketili Line	Station Square towards Varketili
Location

Nadzaladevi (Georgian: ნაძალადევი) is a station on the First Line (Akhmeteli-Varketili Line) of the Tbilisi Metro located between the Gotsiridze and the Station Square. It opened on 11 January 1966, when the first section of the Metro was put into operation. Architects were T. Tevzadze and R. Kiknadze. Construction works were carried out by "Tbilmetromsheni".

The station serves the neighbourhood it is named after. Before the dissolution of the Soviet Union, the station was known as Oktomberi after October Revolution.

== Station Design ==
In the station hall the artwork by Avtandil Gurgenidze is depicted illustrating the night city and the moving metro trains under the city.

The vestibule is a light, fully glazed building (previously used to be fully transparent and now with a blue shade glass after the 2007 renovation). The lower station is divided into three parts in rectangular pylons. The pylons are covered with gray marble and the floor with gray granite tiles.

The station and its vestibule were renovated and overhauled in 2007.

== Gallery ==
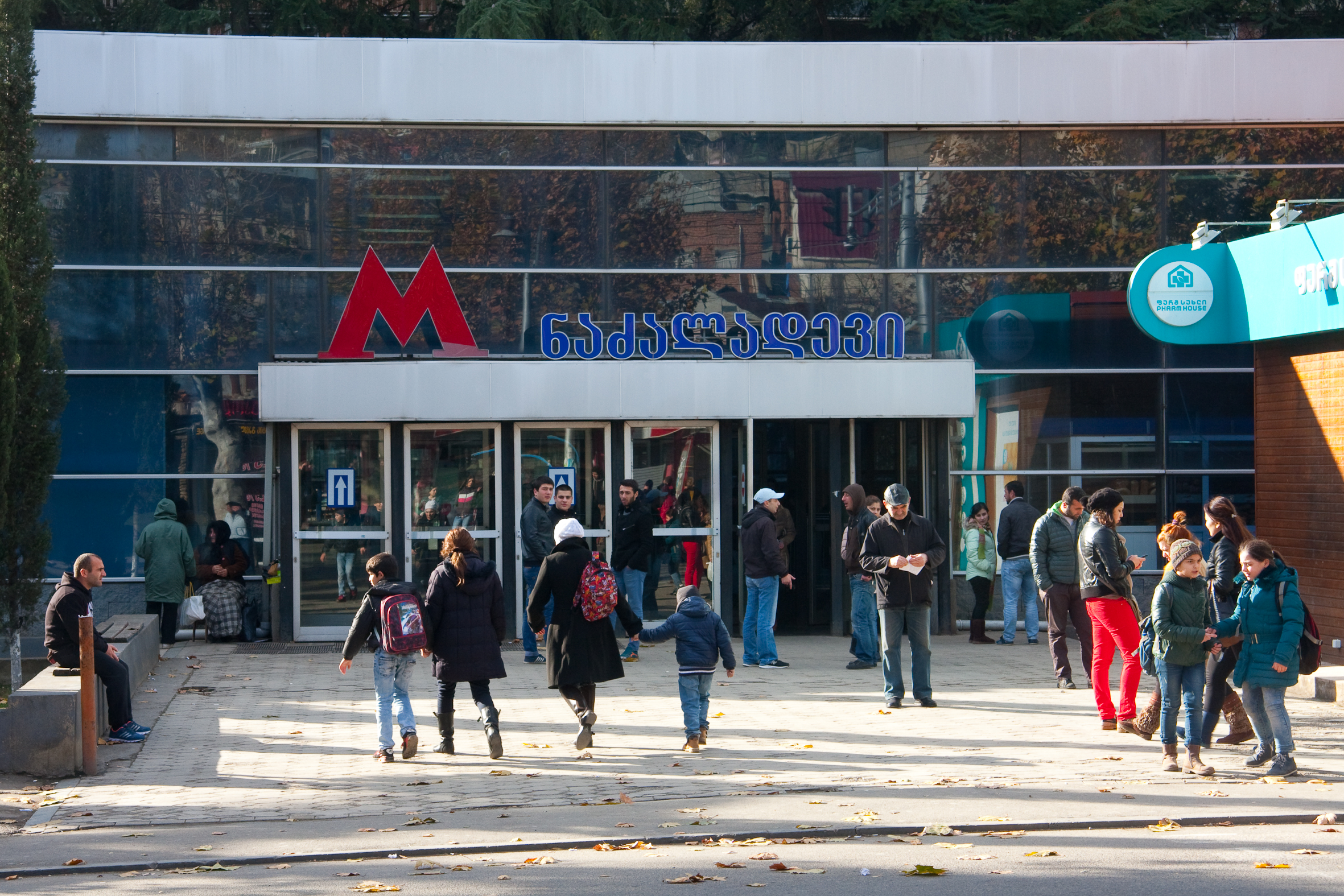
Entrance

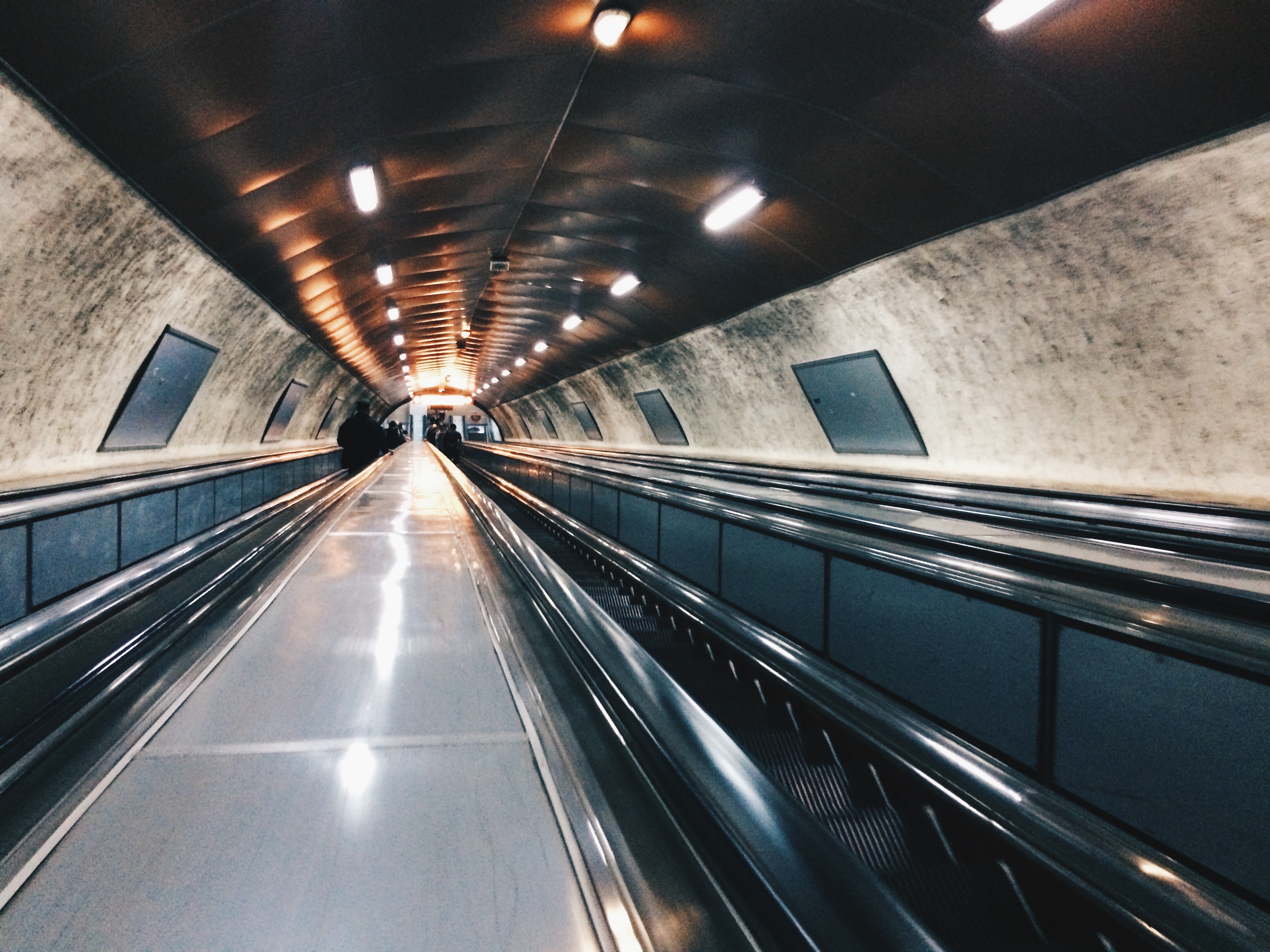
Escalator
