= Merab Abramishvili =

Georgian painter

Merab Abramishvili, Man-Eater of Kumaon, 2005.

Merab Abramishvili (Georgian: მერაბ აბრამიშვილი; 16 March 1957 – 22 June 2006) was a Georgian painter whose works were influenced by medieval arts and European neo-expressionism.

Abramishvili was born in Tbilisi, the capital of then-Soviet Georgia. He graduated from the Tbilisi State Academy of Arts in 1981. His future aesthetics were influenced by medieval Georgian frescoes and Orientalist miniatures which were introduced to him by his father, Guram Abramishvili, an expert in Georgian medieval art at the Art Museum of Georgia.

Impressed by the medieval frescoes from the Ateni Sioni Church, the artist adopted the gesso technique to create the texture of a mural in his easel painting as well. Due to his unique visual language and aesthetics, Abramishvili emerged as one of the leading Georgian artists, who went beyond the established Soviet-era clichés. In the period of post-Soviet political instability, Abramishvili became preoccupied with mystical imagery.

His works were displayed as part of solo and group exhibitions in both Georgia and abroad. His paintings are treasured by the Art Museum of Georgia and National Gallery of Art in Tbilisi as well as Museum Ludwig, Cologne, and private collections in Finland and the United States.

== Gallery ==
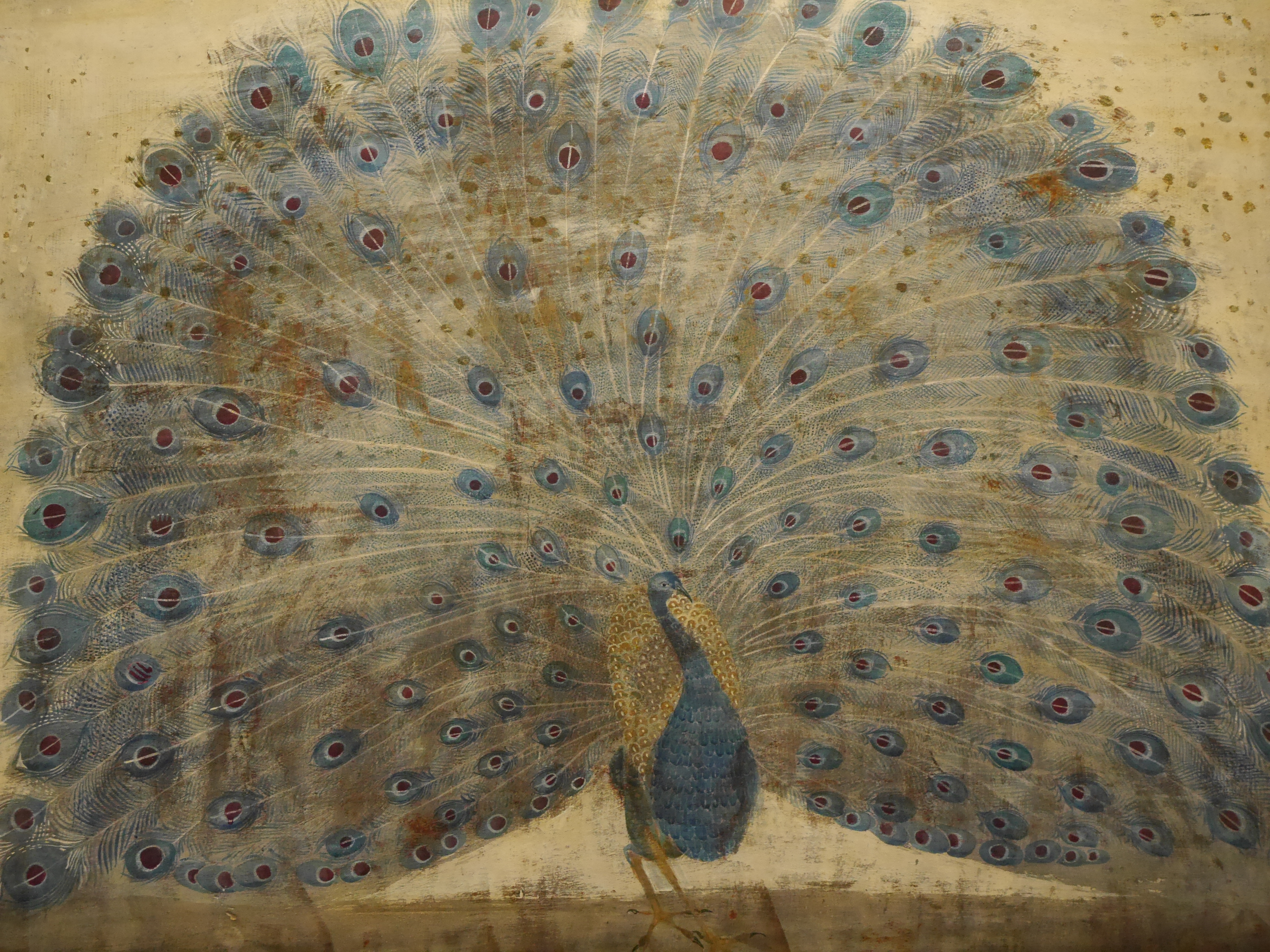
Peacock

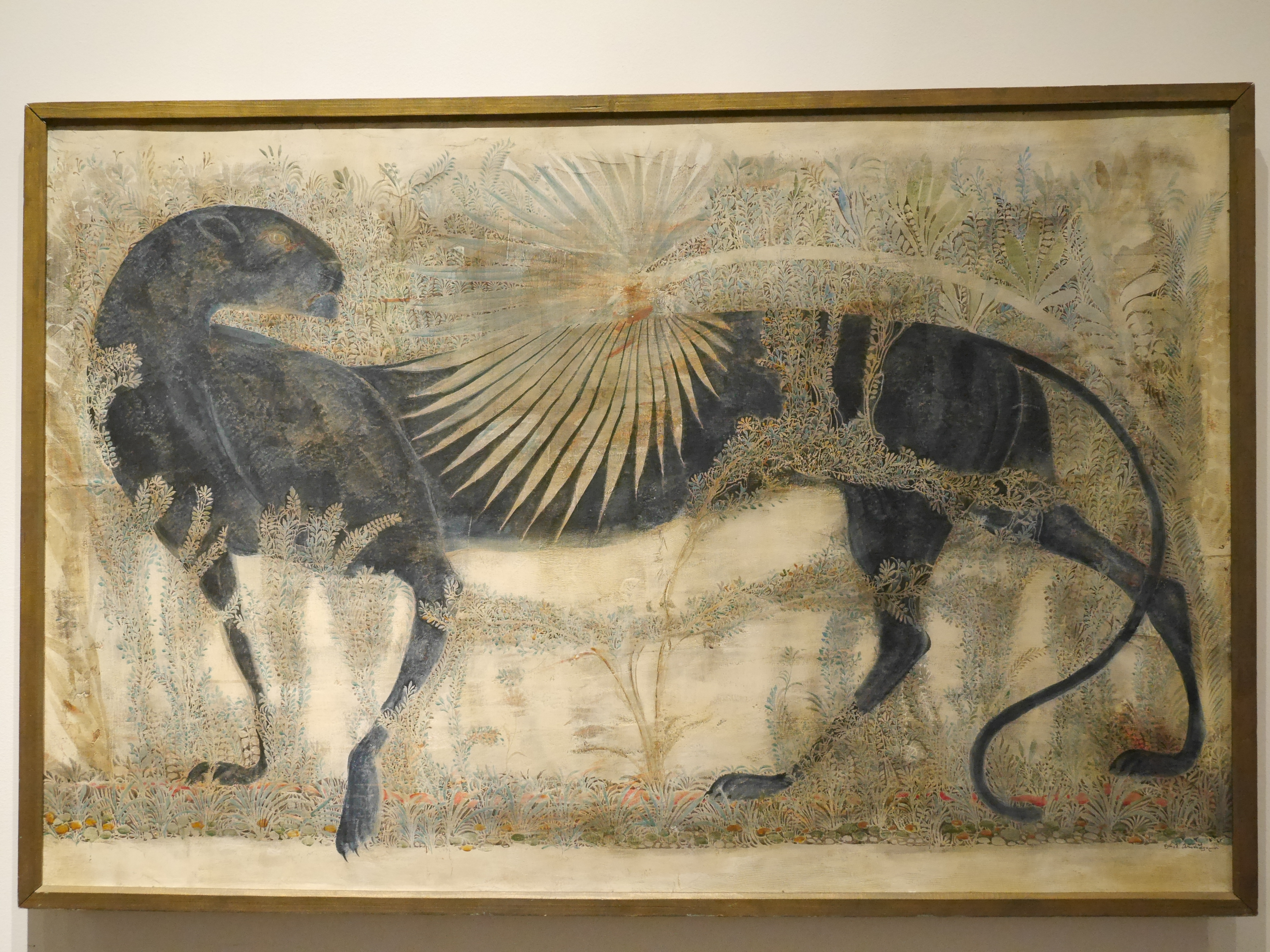
Black panther

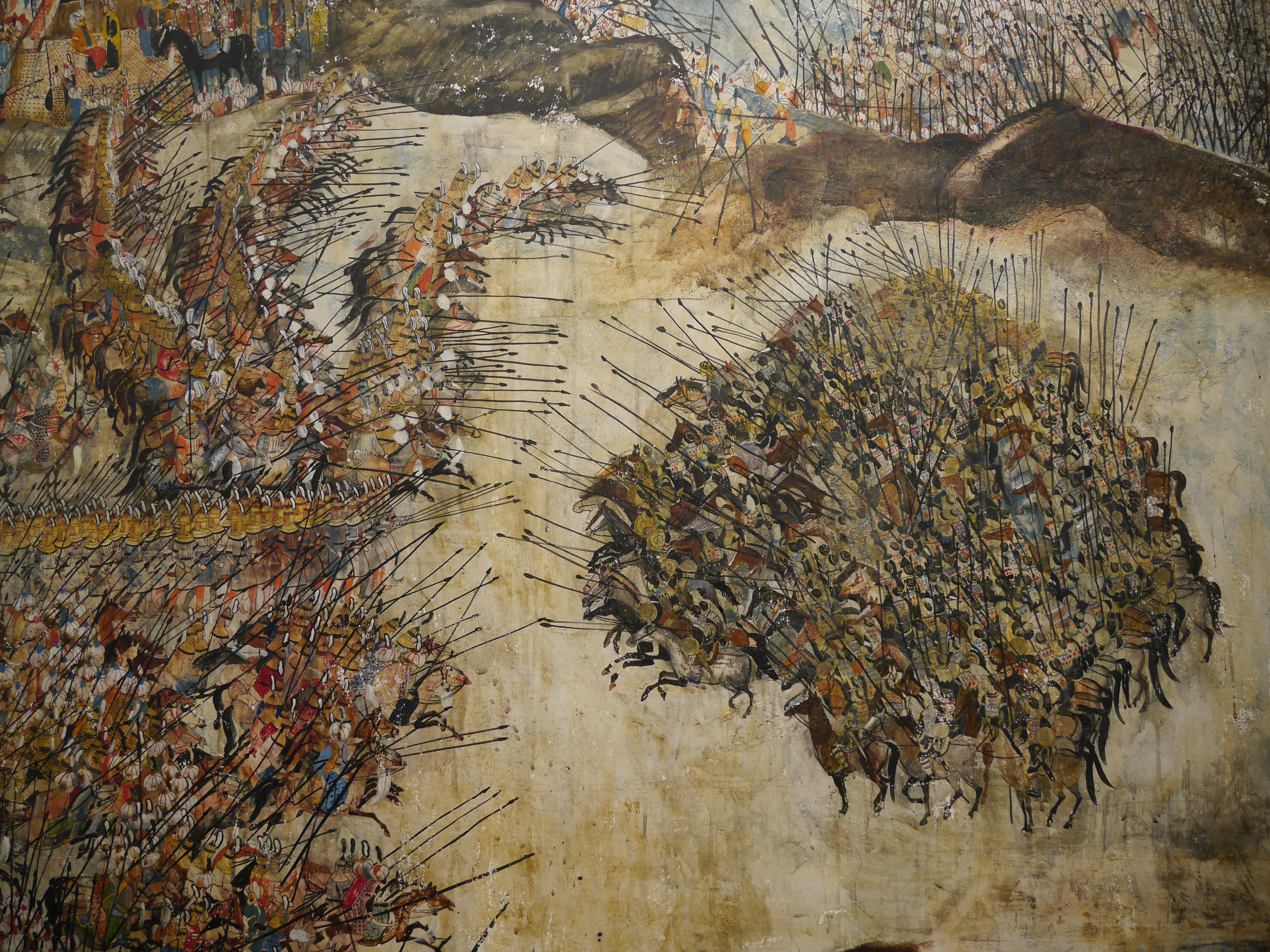
Three Hundred Aragvians

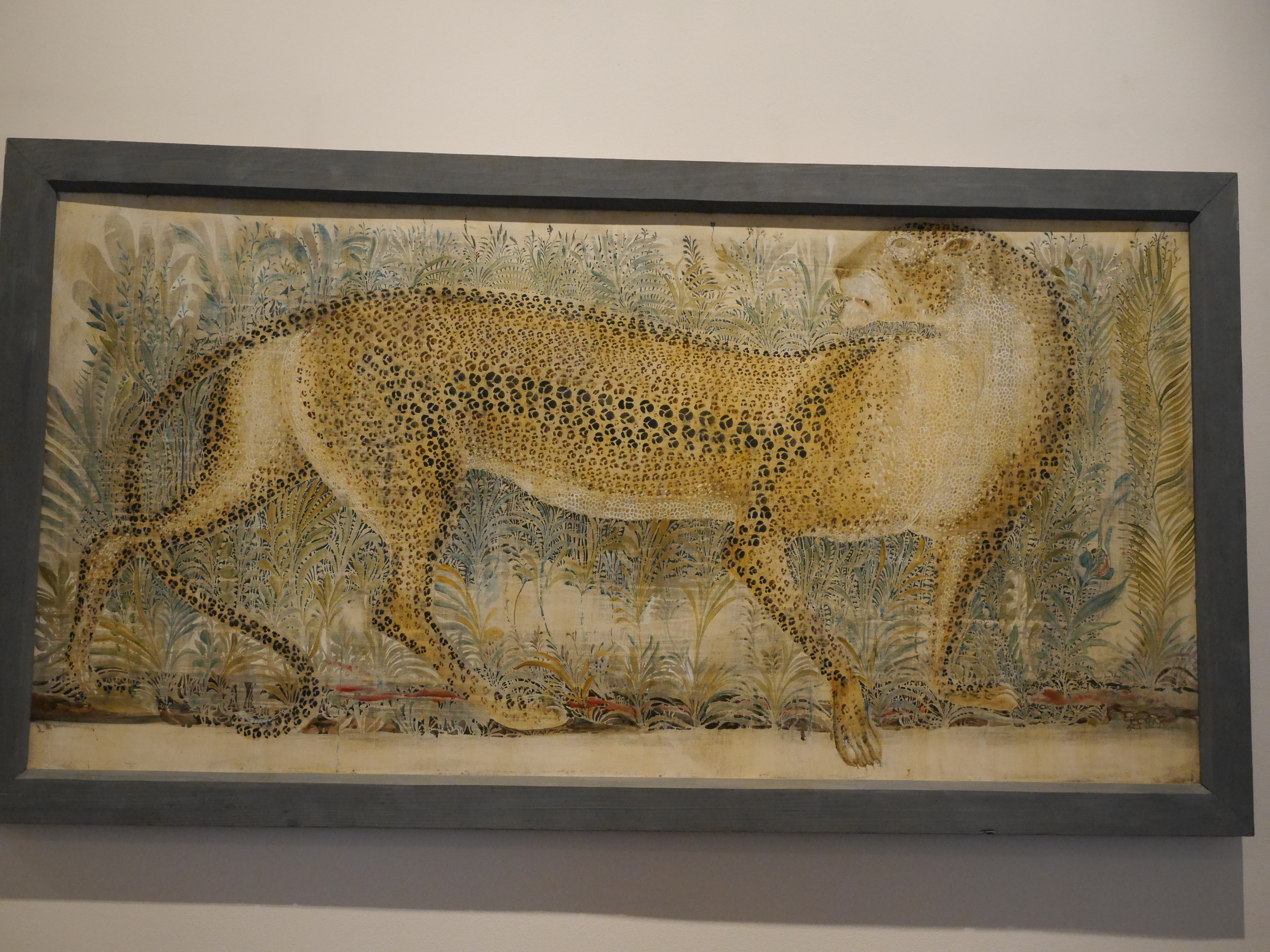
