= Gotsiridze (Tbilisi Metro) =

Tbilisi Metro Station

Gotsiridze გოცირიძე
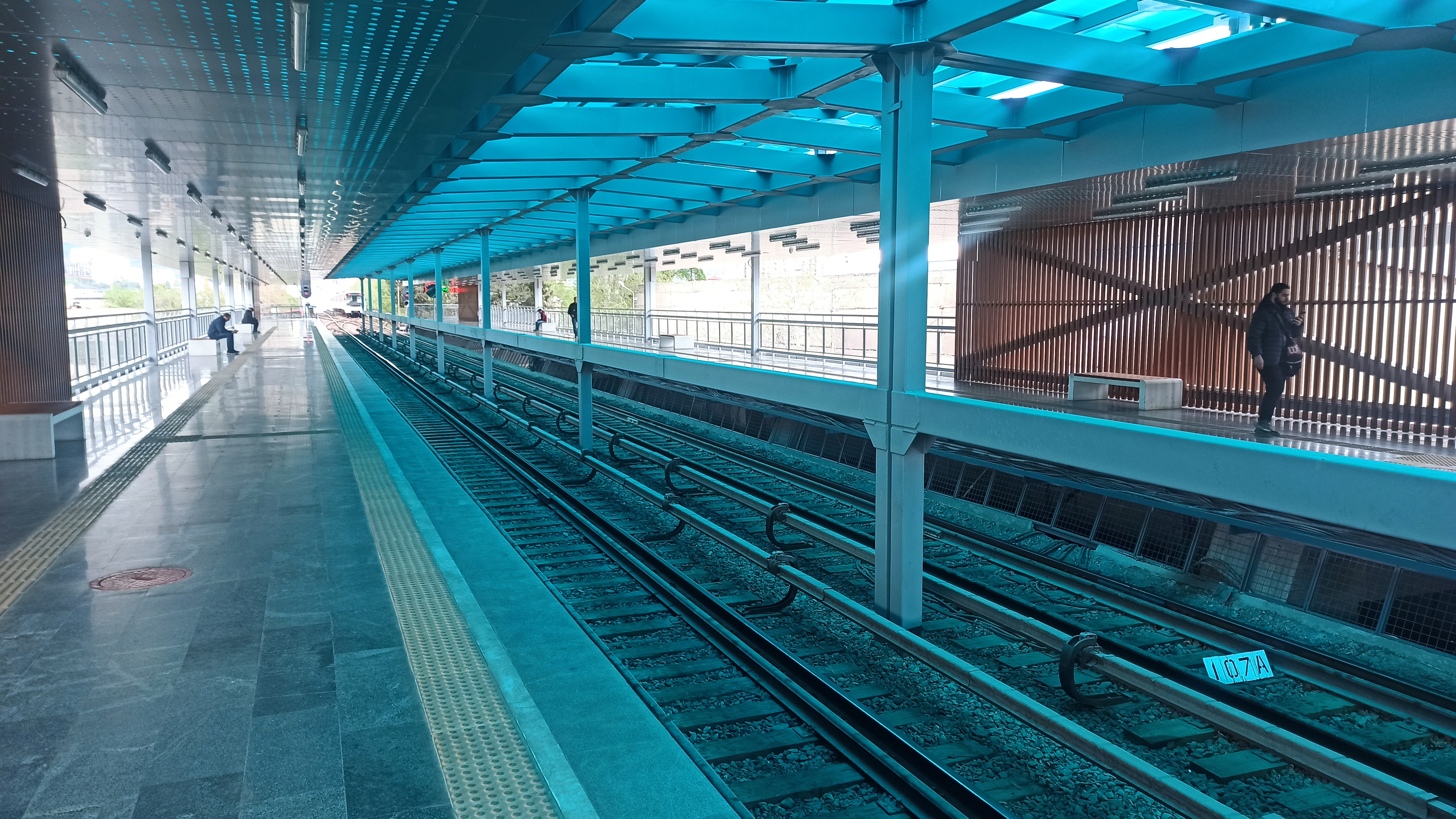
- 2023 photo of station after reconstruction

General information
- Coordinates: 41.742519°N 44.784554°E
- System: Tbilisi Metro station
- Owner: Tbilisi Metro
- Line: Akhmeteli-Varketili Line
- Platforms: Side platforms
- Tracks: 2

Construction
- Structure type: Surface-level
- Platform levels: 2 (1st floor, ground level vestibule, 2nd floor platform)
- Parking: Below elevated tracks
- Accessible: Stairlift for wheelchairs

History
- Opened: 11 January 1966
- Closed: 8 February 2021 (shut for reconstruction)
- Rebuilt: 18 March 2023 (reopened)
- Electrified: Opened in 1966 with 750v third rail
- Former names: Elektrodepo

Services
Preceding station	Tbilisi Metro	Following station
Didube towards Akhmetelis Teatri	Akhmeteli–Varketili Line	Nadzaladevi towards Varketili
Location

Gotsiridze (Georgian: გოცირიძე) is a station on the Akhmeteli–Varketili Line of the Tbilisi Metro. It opened on 11 January 1966. It was formerly known as Elektrodepo (Georgian: ელექტროდეპო "(central) electric railway depot"). It was renamed after engineer Viktor Gotsiridze in 2011. The station is the only station of Tbilisi Metro that feature a side platform arrangement rather than the typical island platform design which all other stations on the network utilise.

In February 2021, renovation works began to take place, and was scheduled to be completed within 3 months. Trains did not stop while construction works were in progress, passing through the station. However, reconstruction works were only completed on 18 March 2023, with facilities dedicated to disabled people such as new elevators and tactile paths.

== Gallery ==
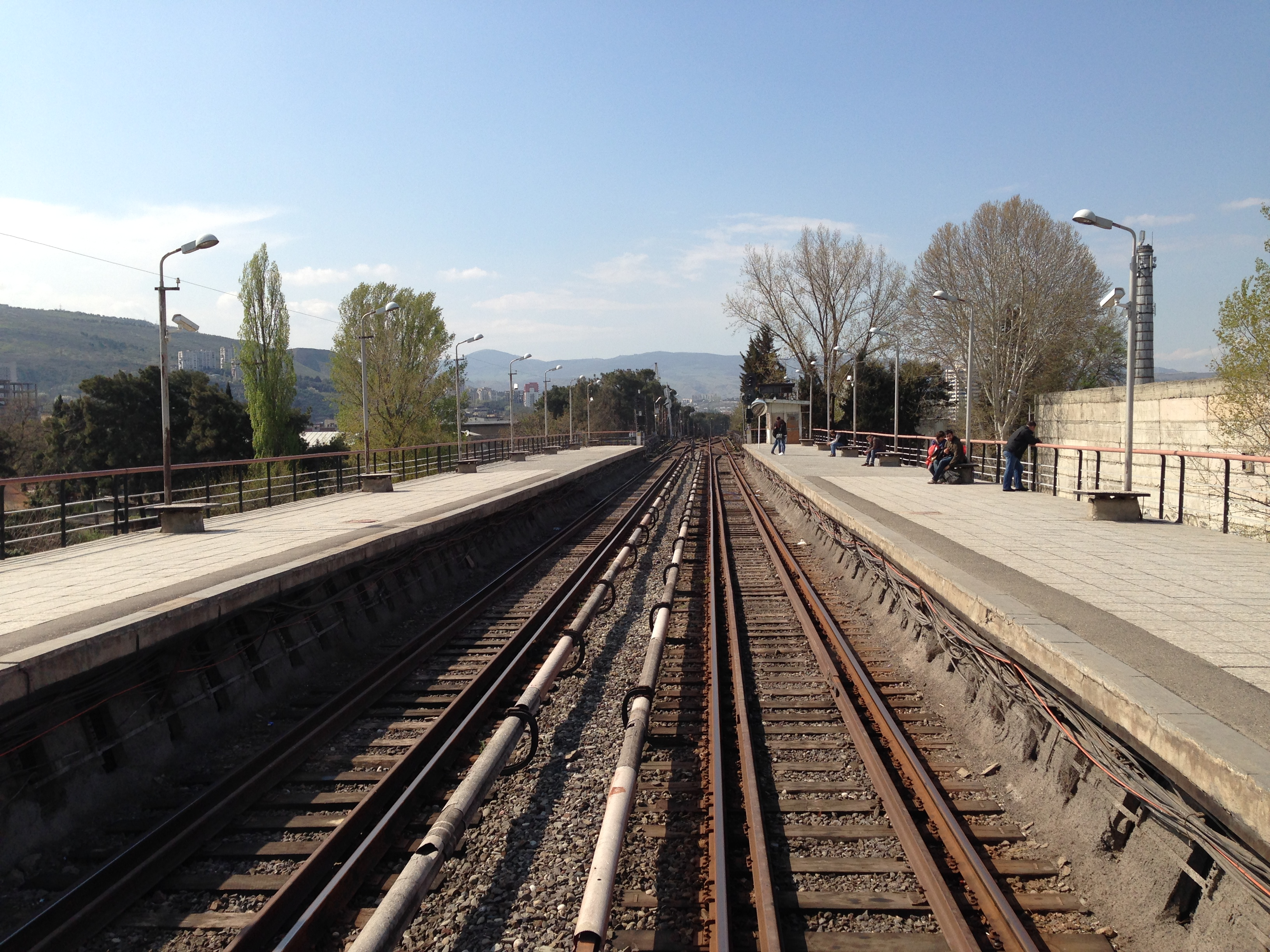
2014 photo of station before reconstruction

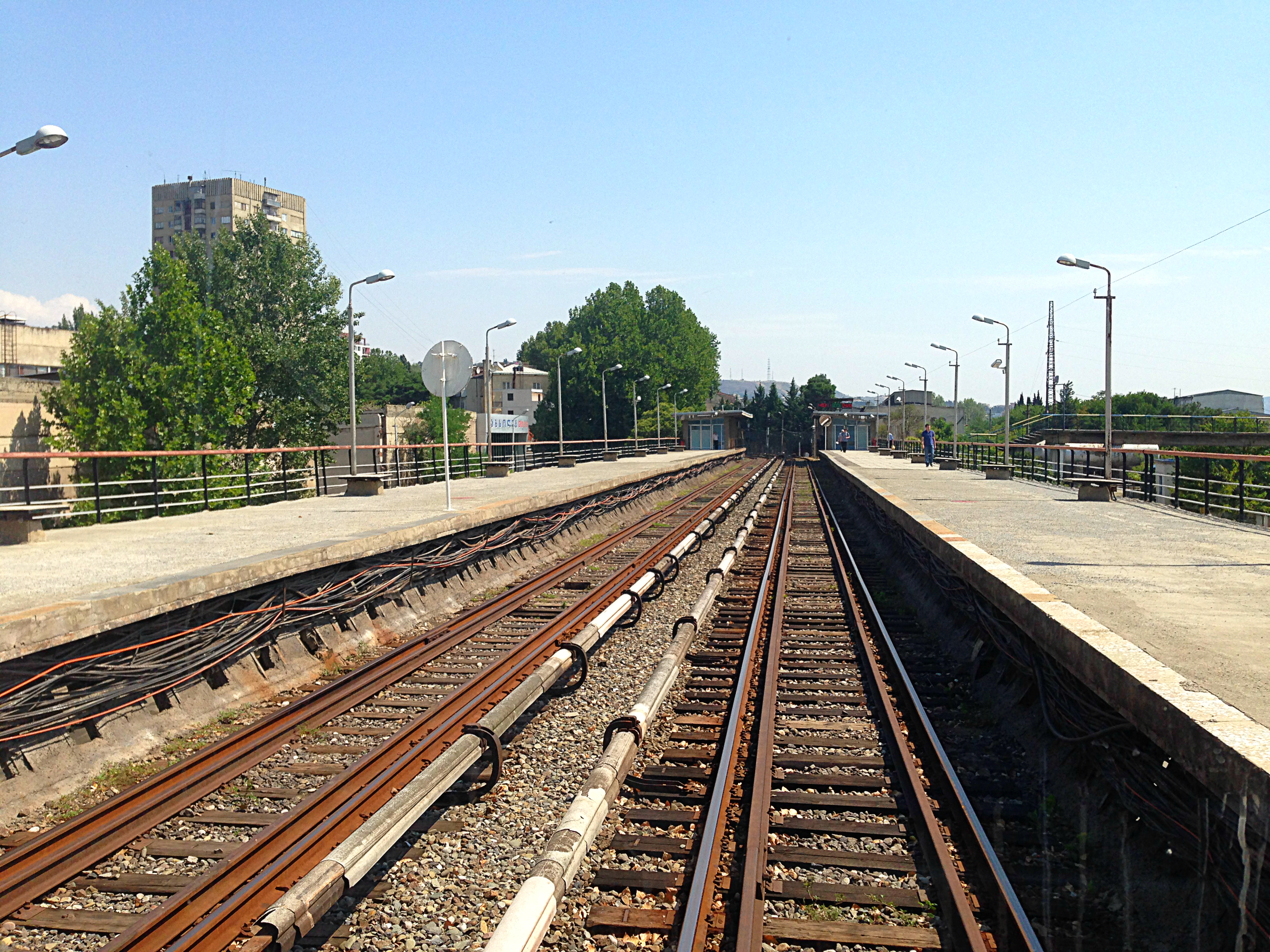

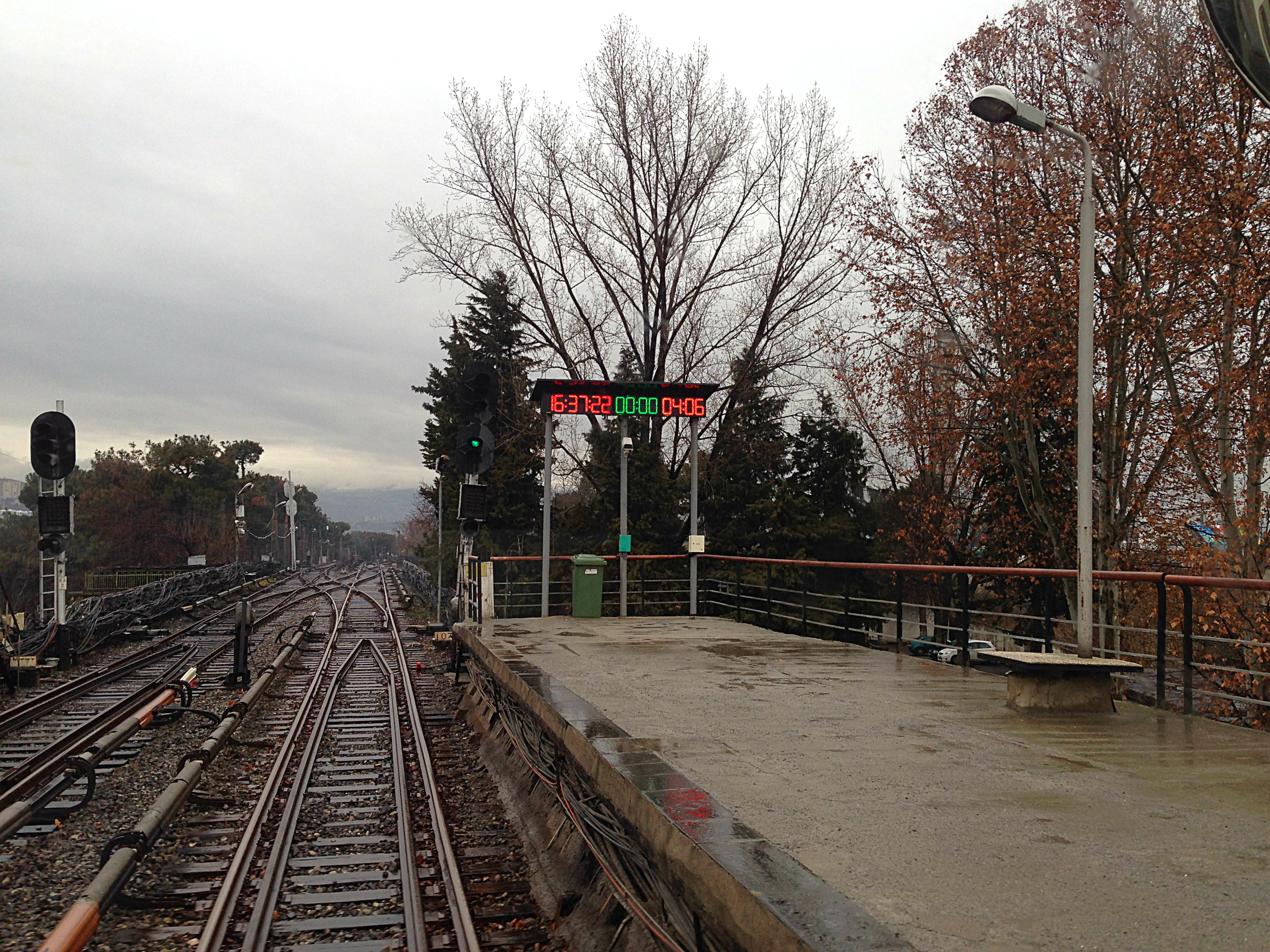

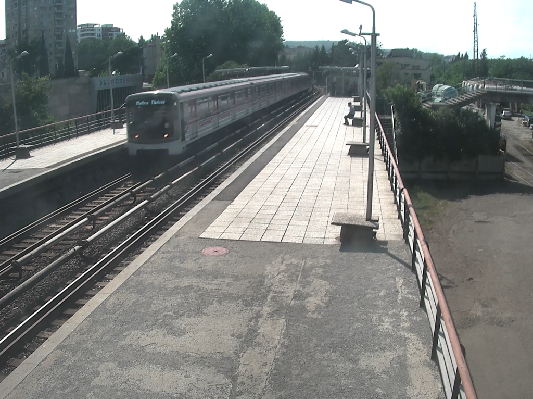
Before reconstruction
