= Guramishvili (Tbilisi Metro) =

Tbilisi Metro Station

Guramishvili გურამიშვილი
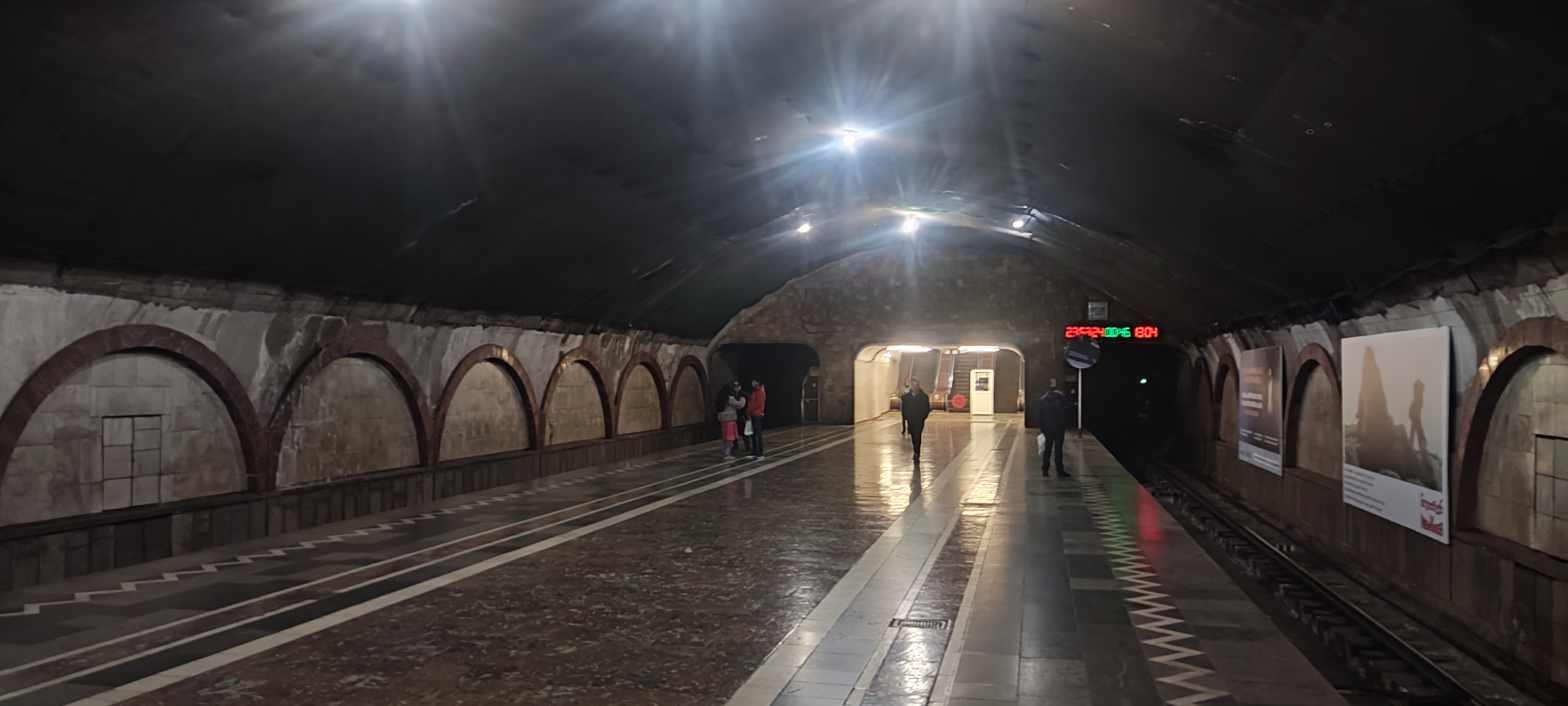

General information
- Coordinates: 41.775009°N 44.79511°E
- System: Tbilisi Metro station
- Owner: Tbilisi Metro
- Line: Akhmeteli-Varketili Line
- Platforms: Island platform
- Tracks: 2

Construction
- Structure type: Underground (Single Vault)
- Platform levels: 2 (Vestibule, Platform)
- Parking: No official parking
- Cycle facilities: No official bike storage
- Accessible: No

History
- Opened: 16 November 1985
- Electrified: Third rail
- Former names: თემქა (Georgian), TEMQA (English, pronounced "TEMKA")

Services
Preceding station	Tbilisi Metro	Following station
Sarajishvili towards Akhmetelis Teatri	Akhmeteli–Varketili Line	Ghrmaghele towards Varketili
Location

The Guramishvili (Georgian: გურამიშვილი) is a station on the Akhmeteli Theatre–Varketili Line of the Tbilisi Metro. It opened on 16 November 1985.

The station was originally called TEMKA (Georgian: თემქა (თბილისის ელმავალმშენებელი ქარხანა)), an abbreviation for the Tbilisi Electric Locomotive Plant. In 1992 it was renamed after the 18th-century Georgian poet David Guramishvili. During the USSR, the purpose of the station was primarily to serve employees of the Tbilisi Electric Locomotive Plant and residents of the surrounding apartment complexes. After the Collapse of the USSR, the production output at TEMQA severely fell, which resulted in the commuter purpose at the station changing mostly to people commuting to and from the residential districts around the factory.

An active revitalization of the TEMQA district could change the way the station is used in the future, including the factory complex of which the station was originally built for.
