= Samasi Aragveli (Tbilisi Metro) =

Tbilisi Metro Station

300 Aragveli 300 არაგველი
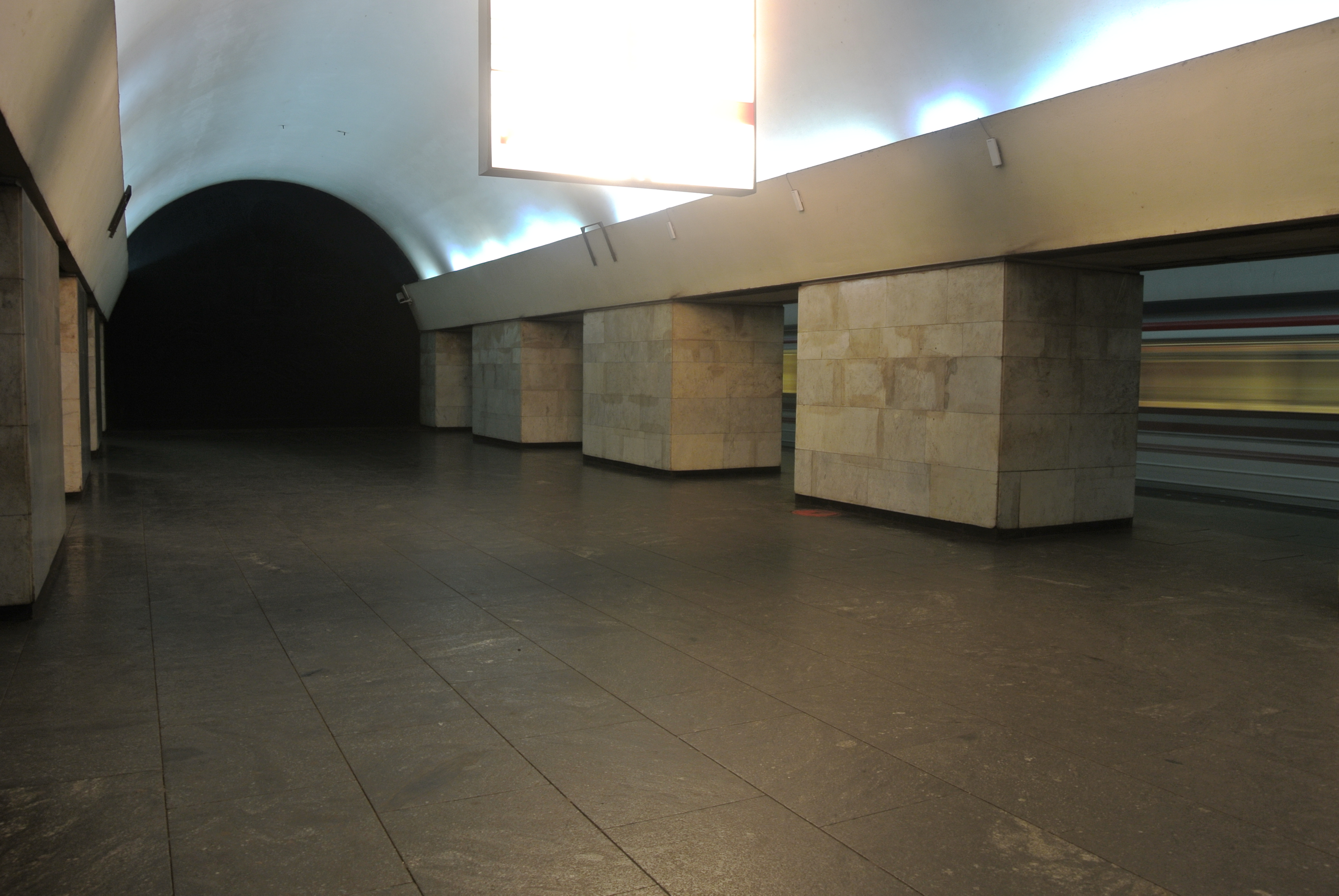

General information
- Coordinates: 41.687516°N 44.826981°E
- System: Tbilisi Metro station
- Platforms: Island platform
- Tracks: 2

Construction
- Platform levels: 1

History
- Opened: 6 November 1967

Services
| Preceding station | Tbilisi Metro | Following station |
|---|---|---|
| Avlabari towards Akhmetelis Teatri | Akhmeteli–Varketili Line | Isani towards Varketili |
Location

300 "Samasi" Aragveli (Georgian: 300 არაგველი, "300 Aragvians") is a station of the Tbilisi Metro on the Akhmeteli–Varketili Line. It is named after 300 soldiers from the Aragvi valley who died defending Tbilisi against the Persian army, at the battle of Krtsanisi in 1795.
