= Three Hundred Aragvians =

Georgian saints

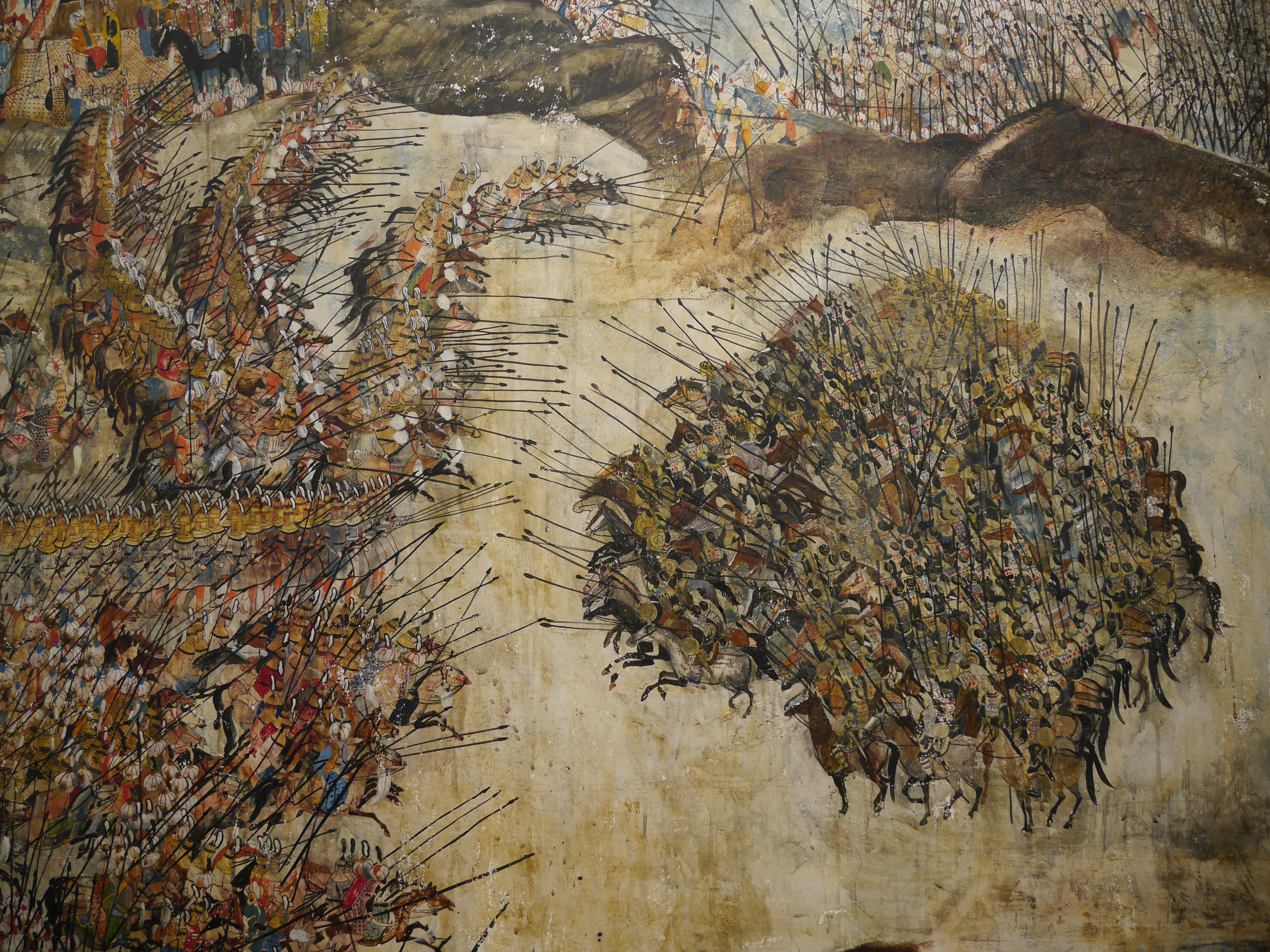
- The Three Hundred Aragvians by Merab Abramishvili.

Holy Martyrs
- Died: 11 September 1795; Tbilisi
- Venerated in: Eastern Orthodox Church
- Canonized: 27 June 2008 by Georgian Orthodox Church
- Feast: 11 September

The Three Hundred Aragvians (Georgian: სამასი არაგველი, romanized: samasi aragveli) is the name by which the Georgian historiography refers to a detachment of the highlanders from the Aragvi valley who fought the last stand at the battle of Krtsanisi, defending Tbilisi against the invading Qajar army in 1795. The Georgian Orthodox Church had the 300 Aragvians and those who fought and died in the battle canonized as martyrs in 2008.

== History ==
The 300 Aragvians were part of the contingent raised from the highland districts on the Aragvi river which saw action under Prince Royal Vakhtang of Georgia, on the approaches of the Georgian capital of Tbilisi, on 11 September 1795. The heavy fighting, unfolding in the fields of Krtsanisi and continuing in the streets of Tbilisi, saw the defeat of the aging and hopelessly outnumbered Georgian king Heraclius II at the hands of the Qajar army led by Agha Muhammad Khan, and the sack of the capital. According to the Georgian accounts, the Aragvians had pledged themselves to fight to the death and stayed true to their oath. Most of them were killed, fighting the last stand at Tbilisi and giving Heraclius a means of retreat.

== Memory ==
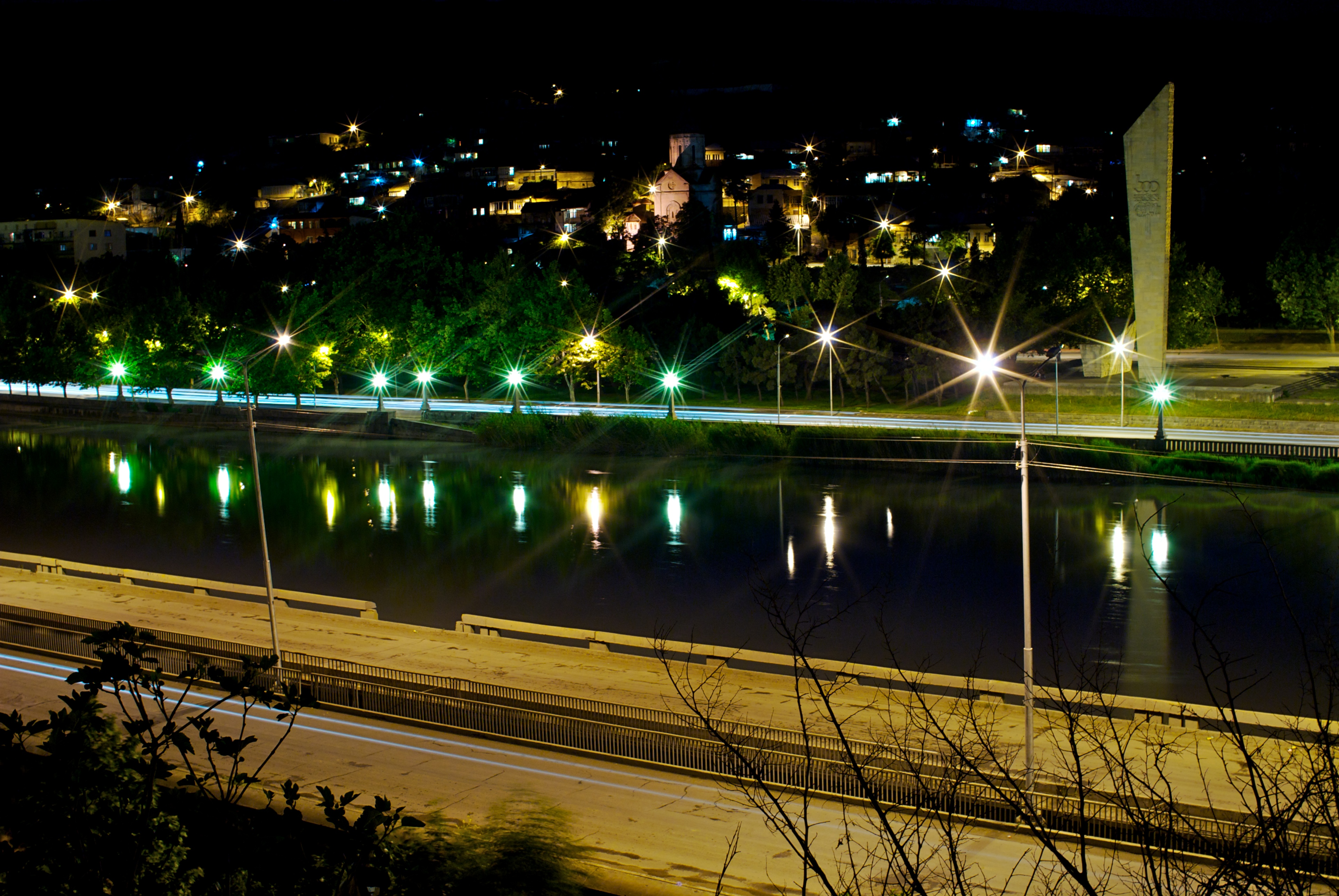
Monument to the 300 Aragvians in Tbilisi.

The 300 Aragvian soldiers were first eulogized in his history by Prince Royal Teimuraz, himself a teenage participant of the 1795 events. The leading figures of the Georgian literature of the 19th and 20th centuries, such as Grigol Orbeliani, Ilia Chavchavadze, Iakob Gogebashvili, Vazha-Pshavela, Galaktion Tabidze, and Lado Asatiani, paid tribute to their memory and helped establish their standing as national heroes.

A monument to the 300 Aragvians, authored by A. Bakradze, was erected in 1959 at the place where remnants of the graves of those who died in 1795 were unearthed. A nearby park and a bridge over the Mtkvari bear the name of the 300 Aragvians and a Tbilisi Metro station opened in 1967 was also named in their honor. On 27 June 2008, the Holy Synod of the Georgian Orthodox Church presided by Catholicos-Patriarch Ilia II canonized the "300 Aragvians, clergy, and laymen perished in the battle of Krtsanisi of 1795" as "holy martyrs", setting 11 September (NS: 24 September) as the day of their commemoration.

== See also ==
- Battle of Thermopylae
