= Didube (Tbilisi Metro) =

Tbilisi Metro Station

Didube დიდუბე
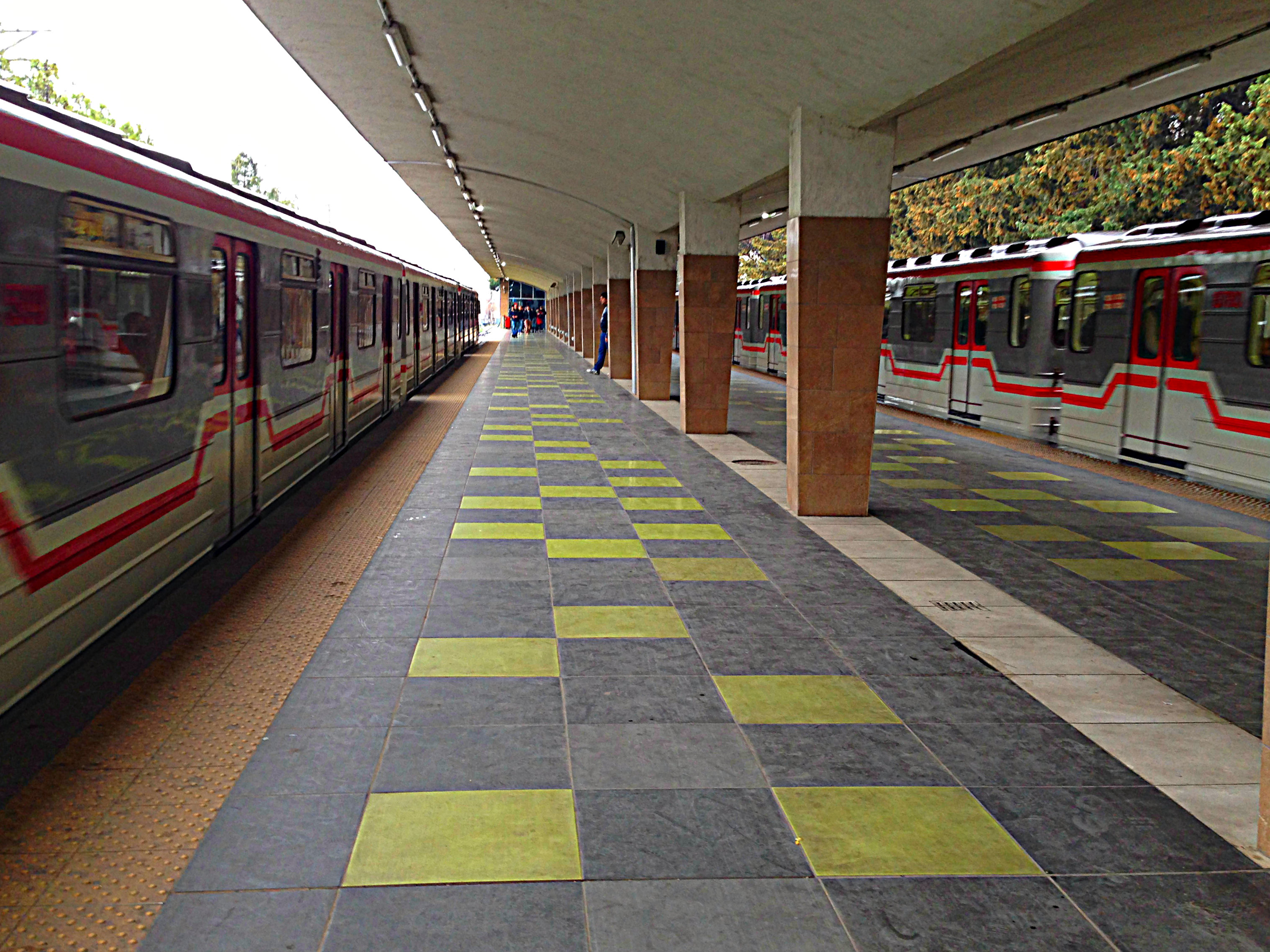

General information
- Coordinates: 41.74987°N 44.780047°E
- System: Tbilisi Metro station
- Owner: Tbilisi Metro
- Line: Akhmeteli-Varketili Line
- Platforms: Island platform
- Tracks: 2+1 interlocking

Construction
- Structure type: Surface-level

History
- Opened: 11 January 1966

Services
Preceding station	Tbilisi Metro	Following station
Ghrmaghele towards Akhmetelis Teatri	Akhmeteli–Varketili Line	Gotsiridze towards Varketili
Location

Didube (Georgian: დიდუბე) is one of two (Note: other station being Gotsiridze) overground stations of Tbilisi Metro in Georgia. It is located on the Akhmeteli-Varketili Line (First Line) and used to be part of original six stations put into operation on 11 January 1966, acting as a northern terminus of the First Line until 1985 when Didube-TEMKA (Nowadays Guramishvili) section was opened.

The station has two entrances, one from the side of Akaki Tsereteli Avenue, next to the Didube Bus Station, accessed through an underway passage, and the second entrance from Tornike Eristavi Street accessed with a bridge above the first track of the station.

The Didube metro station has a unique location and serves as a transport hub, serving the district of Didube and other northern neighbourhoods of Tbilisi. Because of that, the station is also one of the busiest stations in the network. Notorious overcrowding and congestion are not uncommon in the station and in the area surrounding the metro station, where open shops and bazaars existing in the area add extra weight to the issue.

Next to the station is Didube Bus Station, one of the busiest bus stations of Tbilisi, which is used for traveling to mainly western and northern directions of the country.

Also, the same-named railway station of Didube lies almost parallel to the station, which is used by some passenger rail routes.

In the previous century, during the development of the third line of the Tbilisi Metro, Didube metro station was planned to be one of the interlink stations with the third line connecting the network in the direction of Didi Dighomi.

== See also ==
- List of Tbilisi metro stations
