= Akhmeteli–Varketili Line =

Tbilisi Metro first line

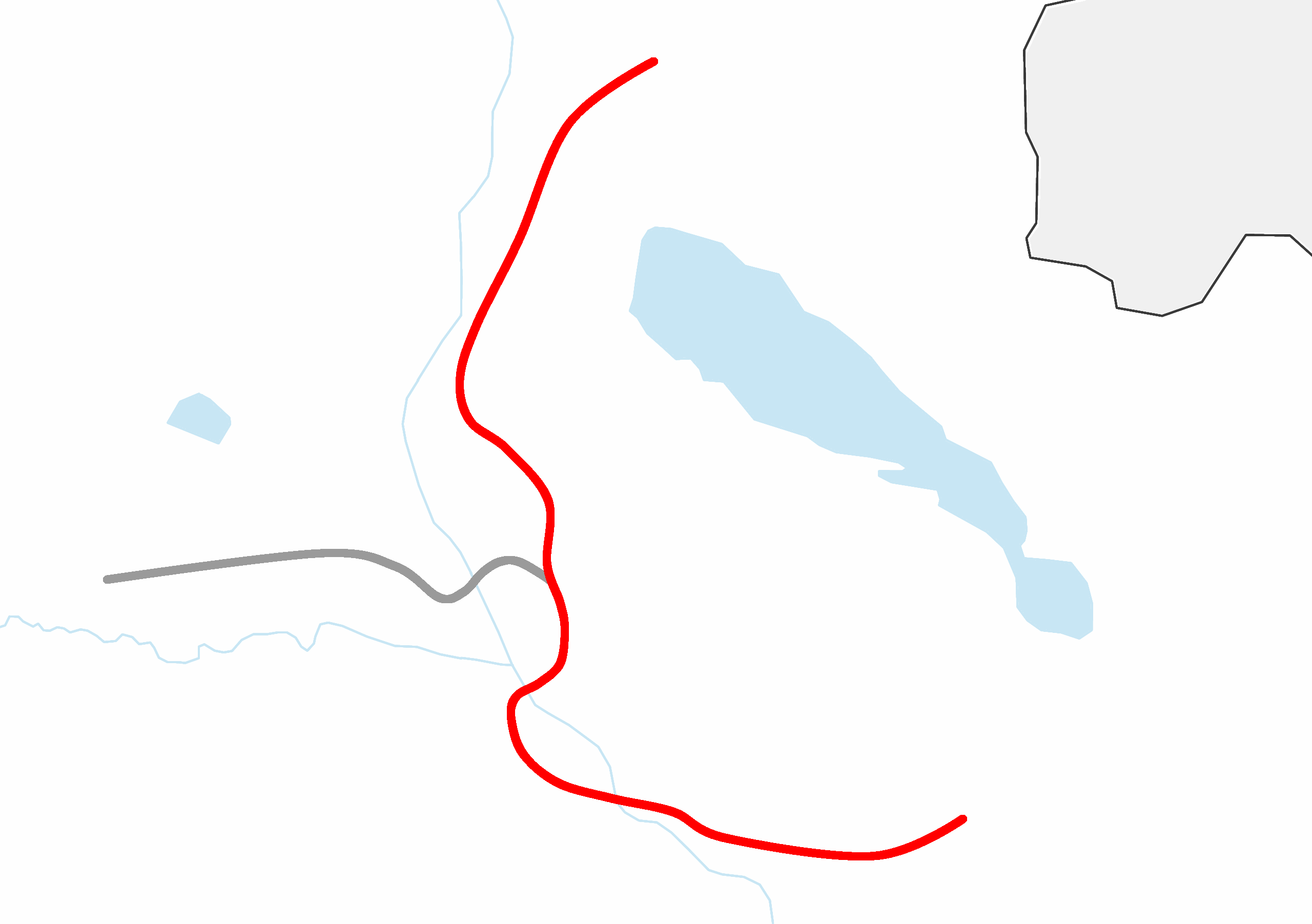

Overview
- Other name: First Line (Pirveli Khazi)
- Native name: ახმეტელი-ვარკეთილის ხაზი
- Locale: Tbilisi, Georgia
- Termini: Akhmeteli Theatre; Varketili
- Stations: 16

Service
- Type: Rapid transit
- System: Tbilisi Metro
- Operator(s): Tbilisi Transport Company

History
- Commenced: 1952
- Opened: 11 January 1966; 60 years ago
- Last extension: 1989

Technical
- Line length: 19.6 km (12.2 mi)

The Akhmeteli–Varketili Line (Georgian: ახმეტელი-ვარკეთილის ხაზი) (formerly known as Didube–Samgori and Gldani–Varketili line; and also alternatively written as Akhmeteli Theatre–Varketili line) is a line of the Tbilisi Metro, which was opened to the public on 11 January 1966 as a first stage of the metro system and currently cuts the city on north-south axis. The line operates on approximately 19.6 kilometres of route and serves 16 stations.

The line is also colloquially known as the First Line, which is also used as a reference by metro station announcers.

== History ==
Segment	Date opened
Didube-Rustaveli	January 11, 1966
Rustaveli-300 Aragveli	November 6, 1967
300 Aragveli-Samgori	May 5, 1971
Samgori-Varketili	November 9, 1985
Didube-Guramishvili	November 16, 1985
Guramishvili-Akhmetelis Teatri	January 7, 1989

=== Name changes ===
Station	Previous name(s)	Years
Akhmetelis teatri	Gldani	1989-1992
Guramishvili	TEMKA (TEVZ)	1985-1992
Nadzaladevi	Oktomberi	1966-1992
Liberty Square	Leninis Moedani	1967-1992
Avlabari	26 Komisari	1967-1992
Gotsiridze	Elektrodepo	1966-2011

== Transfers ==
#	Transfer to	At
2	Saburtalo Line	Station Square

== Rolling stock ==
The line is served by the Gldani depot (№2), currently 24 four - carriage trains are assigned to it. A mix of Еzh3, Еma-502, Еm-508T as well as the newer 81-714.5, 81-717.5. Additional Ezh3 and Em-508T subway cars were received in 1985 from Tashkent Metro. All of the trains are undergoing major repairs and there is also a large carriage reserve park. All the other trains are being retired and scrapped. Type Ezh, Ezh1, was retired from passenger service in 2013. Until 2010, type E was in service since the very opening of the metro.

The modernization of the existing fleet includes serious change in the train's interior and exterior, thus replacing the original seats with antivandal seats, the light system in the interior is also refurbished. They received a modification of 81-717M/81-714M, similar refurbishments were also made for Baku and Yerevan metro systems.

The trains are repainted into silver grey and red livery and receive a new front mask with display on the top part, making some of them visually similar to the 81-71M trains in Prague Metro.

== Recent developments and potential expansion ==
Because some of the stations have been operative for over five decades, as well as neglect caused by the lack of funding during the 1990s, most of them require a major facelift and some severe repairs on hydroisolation and structure.

In February 2021, renovation works began to take place at the Gotsiridze station, and were scheduled to be completed within 3 months. Trains did not stop while construction works were in progress, passing through the station. However, due to the failure of the previous contractor to fulfill the obligations and the need to switch to another contractor, reconstruction works were only completed on 18 March 2023. Facilities dedicated to the disabled, such as new elevators and tactile paths were installed.

Some of the older expansion plans had the concept of making the line fully circular to encompass Tbilisi Sea from both directions.

In perspective, the line could be extended to further neighbourhoods of Gldani and Samgori districts, which was realized as a concept in more recent plans of the metro system.
