= Varketili (Tbilisi Metro) =

Tbilisi Metro Station

Varketili ვარკეთილი
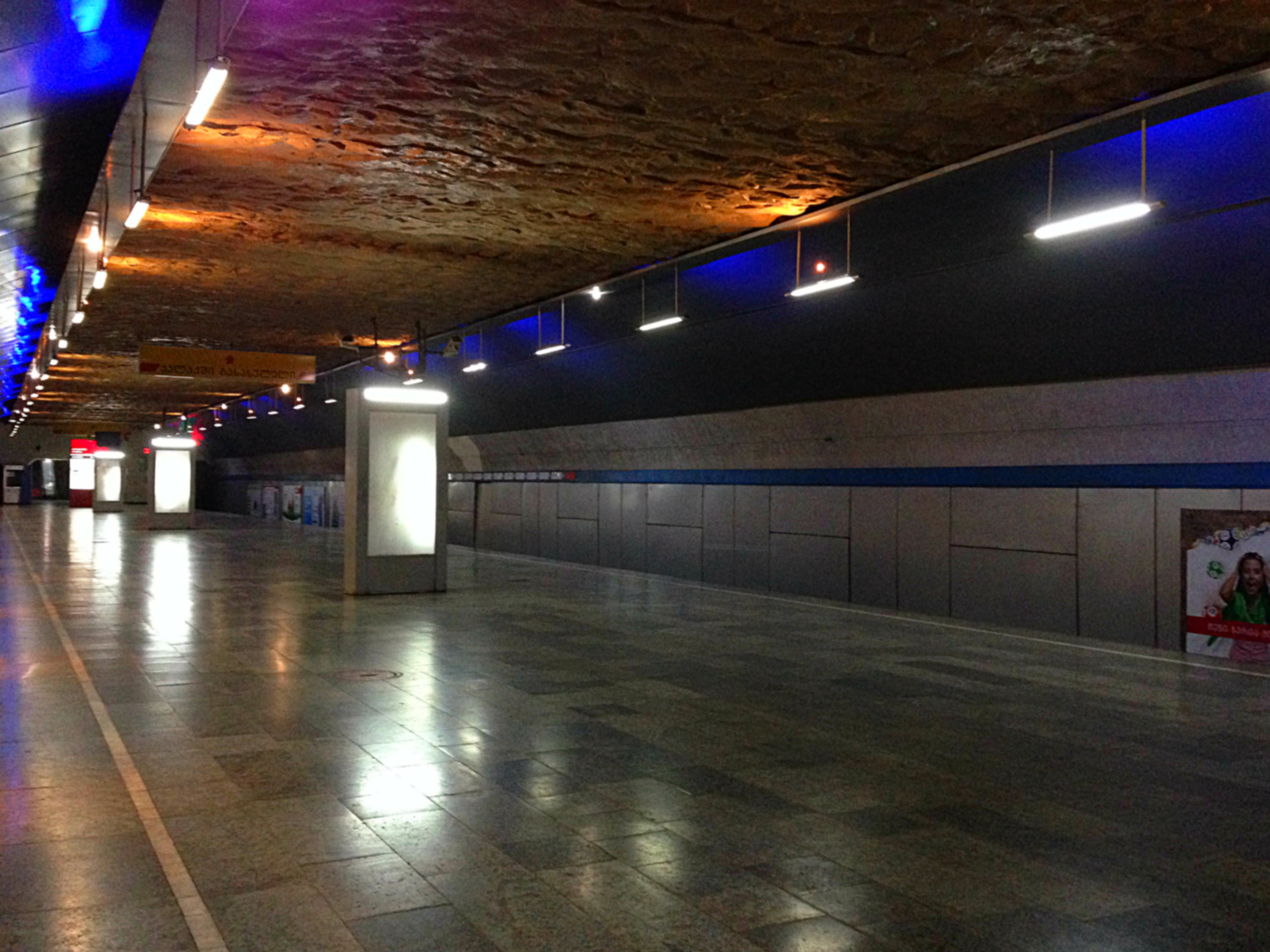
- Appearance of Varketili station after its second modernization, from 2006 to 2017.

General information
- Coordinates: 41.691101°N 44.870428°E
- System: Tbilisi Metro station
- Line: Akhmeteli-Varketili Line
- Platforms: Island platform
- Tracks: 2

Construction
- Structure type: single vault metro station
- Platform levels: 2 (platform, vestibule)

History
- Opened: November 1981
- Rebuilt: 2006, 2017, 2023
- Electrified: 750v DC third rail

Services
Preceding station	Tbilisi Metro	Following station
Samgori towards Akhmetelis Teatri	Akhmeteli–Varketili Line	Terminus
Location

Varketili (Georgian: ვარკეთილი) is a station of the Tbilisi Metro on the Akhmeteli–Varketili Line. It opened in 1981 and was renovated in 2007 and 2017 and is in progress of yet another renovation in 2023. Varketili is the last station on line 1 and is the nearest to the airport.

== 2018 Incident ==
In January 2018, only a few months after the updated station was opened, the roof of the station collapsed due to the vibrations made by the trains' old and loud motors. Vibrations from flat spots on the rails also contributed to the structural deterioration of the roof. 14 people were injured and thankfully there were no deaths. This was caused by poor build quality by the company Kvarelmsheni LTD. After the incident, some employees of the company were sued. From that time until December 2022, The ceiling was full of drywall holding accessories. In December 2022, a company known as Mamisoni LTD decided to partner with the Tbilisi Transport Company and renovate the station again.

== Modernization ==
In February 2023, modernization began for Varketili Station, which was in dire need of repairs after the 2018 tragedy. The new station will have new escalators, replacing the old Soviet ones, and will also have the remains of the old ceiling, which contained asbestos, removed. The station will receive a completely new design, by Georgian company "DODO designs". Along with the visual changes, the station will receive new LED lights, electrical systems, plumbing, and general infrastructure. The entire project is set to cost 13.4 million GEL.

Along with the announcement, the Tbilisi Mayor, Kakha Kaladze, disclosed information regarding the station's rehabilitation:

"We are starting the rehabilitation works of the Varketili metro. Certain works were carried out under the previous Mayor, but we remember what a miserable result happened in the Varketili metro, I mean the collapse of the ceiling. Since then, it has not been possible to carry out these works. There were too many problems with companies taking responsibility. The company that will perform the mentioned works is "Bada Construction", which also carries out the rehabilitation works of Avlabari metro. The total value of the contract is 13.4 million GEL, which includes the complete rehabilitation of the interior and internal infrastructure of the station. Among them, the existing asbestos ceiling will be dismantled and a new ceiling will be installed with modern materials. The company will start work on February 9 and it will be implemented according to all established norms and standards. The term of performance of works was determined for 18 months. The mentioned project should be completed by the summer of next year. We will have to close the metro station for about 2 months, between June and August, for the safe dismantling/installation of the asbestos ceiling in the lower platform and inclined tunnel of the Varketili metro station. During the metro station closure period, we will do our best and try to add transport lines to the Varketili direction, with the appropriate number of buses, in order to help passengers reach their destination as much as possible,"
