= Akhmetelis Teatri (Tbilisi Metro) =

Tbilisi Metro Station

Akhmetelis Teatri ახმეტელის თეატრი
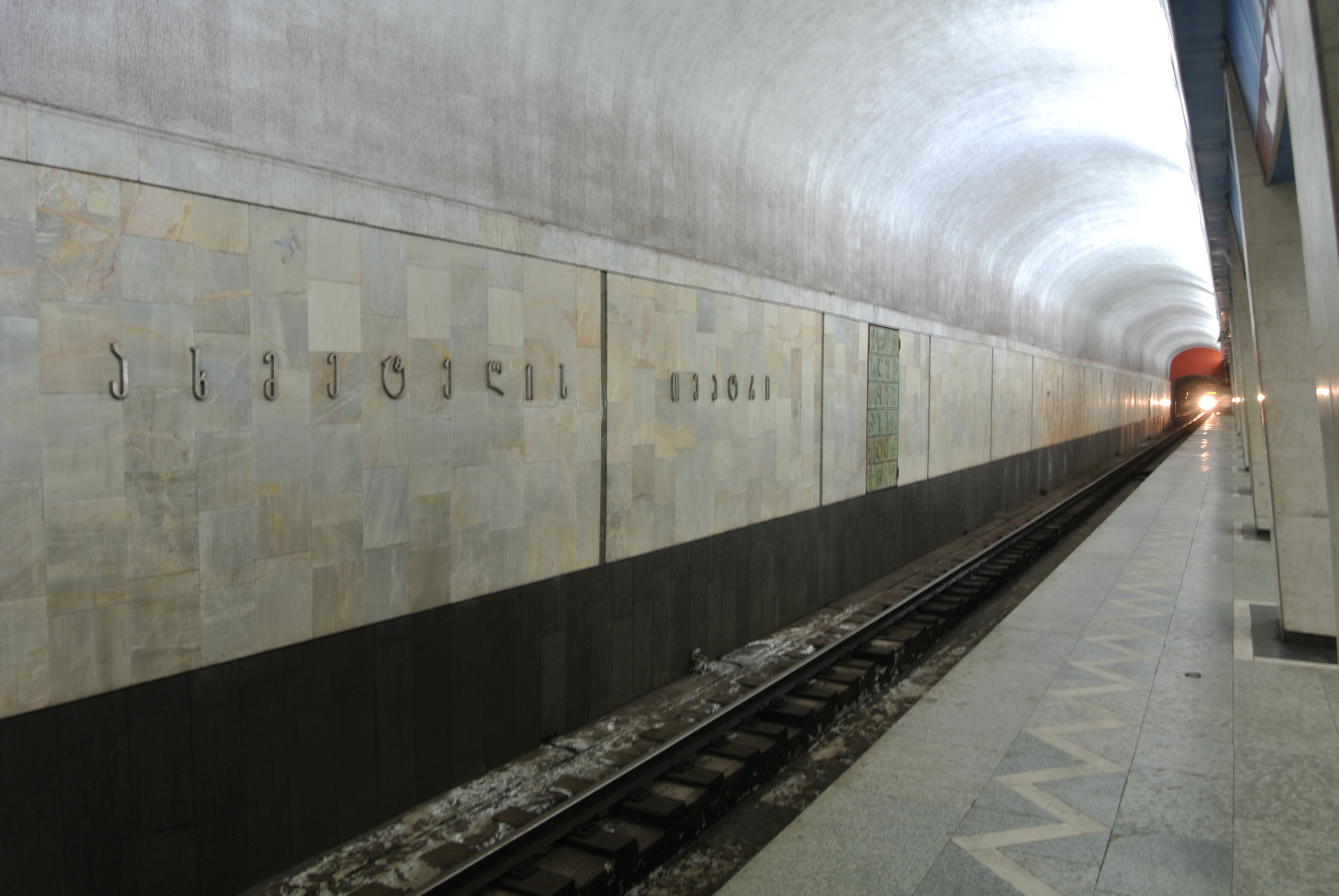

General information
- Coordinates: 41.791762°N 44.815913°E
- System: Tbilisi Metro station
- Owner: Tbilisi Metro
- Platforms: Island platform
- Tracks: 2+1 Interlocking

Construction
- Structure type: Underground
- Accessible: To be adapted after 2023

History
- Opened: 7 January 1989
- Electrified: 750v third rail
- Former names: Gldani

Services
Preceding station	Tbilisi Metro	Following station
Terminus	Akhmeteli–Varketili Line	Sarajishvili towards Varketili
Location

The Akhmetelis Teatri (Officially translated as Akhmeteli Theatre) (Georgian: ახმეტელის თეატრი) is a northern terminus on the Akhmeteli–Varketili Line of the Tbilisi Metro. It opened on 7 January 1989, alongside Sarajishvili metro station.

The authors of the station project are G. Razmadze and Solomon Cholokashvili. The station serves the neighbourhoods of Gldani District.

The station was originally named as Gldani (Georgian: გლდანი). The name of the station changed in 1992 after the nearby Akhmeteli Theatre, which is named after Sandro Akhmeteli (1886-1937), a theatre director and one of the founders of the modern Georgian theater, who was tortured and purged under Joseph Stalin and Lavrentiy Beria.

In recent years, the station and the entrance area experiences heavy crowds and congestions due to the station only having one entrance serving the neighborhoods of several hundred thousand people.

During the last years of the Soviet Union, works began on a second exit south to the station, but was abandoned after the dissolution of the USSR. The plans to finish the second exit of the station were introduced in 2022. As of 2022, EBRD and the Tbilisi Mayor's Office announced that Akhmeteli Theatre would have its second exit completed, and the infrastructure of the station would be adapted for people with disabilities.
