= Trans-Anatolian railway =

Railway lines

The Trans-Anatolian Railway is the unofficial name for a series of railway lines crossing Anatolia in Turkey. The line starts at Haydarpaşa in Istanbul and ends at Doğukapı before the Turkish/Armenian border. The Trans-Anatolian Railway consists of these three lines:

- Istanbul–Ankara railway
- Ankara–Kars railway
- Kars–Gyumri–Tbilisi railway - Between Kars and Doğukapı.

== History ==
The railway was constructed by three different companies over a period of 68 years. The first part of the railway was constructed between 1871 and 1872. This was a 26 km (16 mi) long line between Haydarpaşa and Pendik, in Istanbul. The line was built by the Ottoman Government. The Ottoman Empire extended the railway east to İzmit, until the line was sold to a new company, the Anatolian Railway (CFOA). The CFOA continued to build east, reaching Arifye in 1890 and Ankara in 1892. The CFOA were to continue to build to Kayseri but because of the Baghdad Railway, the company focused on building south to Adana. The second part of the railway was built in 1899 by the Transcaucasus Railway. The railway was built in the 1,520 mm (4 ft 11 27/32 in) "Russian Gauge", from Tbilisi to Kars, which the Ottomans lost in 1878 to the Russian Empire. The Trancaucasus Railway extended the line to Sarıkamış in 1913 and during World War I built a 750 mm (2 ft 5 1/2 in) narrow gauge line from Sarıkamış to Erzurum. After the war, the newly formed Republic of Turkey took back Kars and took over the two rail lines. The Turkish State Railways continued the former CFOA's work and built a railway from Ankara to Kayseri in 1927. The railway was completed to Sivas in 1930, Çetinkaya in 1936, Erzincan in 1938 and Erzurum in 1939. However the line from Erzurum to Kars was broad gauge until the State Railways converted into standard gauge in 1962.
