= Georgian Railway =

National railway company in Georgia

JSC Georgian Railway

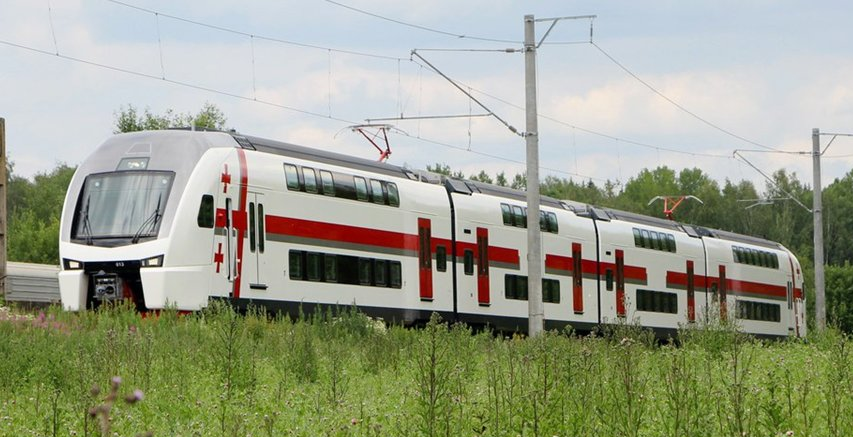
- Native name: სს საქართველოს რკინიგზა
- Type: State owned Joint-stock company
- Industry: railway
- Founded: October 10, 1872; 153 years ago in Tbilisi, Georgia
- Headquarters: Tbilisi, Georgia
- Area served: Georgia
- Revenue: ₾357.8 million (2014)
- Total assets: ₾1.2309 billion
- Total equity: ₾676 million
- Owner: JSC Partnership Fund (100%)
- Number of employees: ~13,000 (2017)
- Website: railway.ge

Georgian Railway (Georgian: საქართველოს რკინიგზა, romanized: sakartvelos rk'inigza) is a fully state-owned railway company of Georgia, both managing infrastructure and operating freight and passenger travel in Georgia.

A vital artery linking the Black Sea and the Caspian Sea, it sits on the shortest route between Europe and Central Asia. Built to 1,520 mm (4 ft 11 27/32 in) standard Russian gauge, at present the fully electrified mainline of the Georgian Railway is 1,323.9 km (total: 1,576 km) in length, consisting of 1,422 bridges, 32 tunnels, 22 passenger and 114 goods stations. In 2017, Georgian Railways passenger ridership was 2,684,000, of which 100,000 were international passengers, the rest domestic.

== History ==
The railway was founded in 1865, and operations started in 1871 between Poti and Kvirila (present day Zestaponi). The first passenger train ran on October 10, 1872, from Poti to Tbilisi central station.

From this central spine, the railway network expanded with links to: Rioni to Kutaisi (1877), Rioni-Tkibuli (1887), Zestaponi to Chiatura (1895). The Tbilisi to Baku line became operational in 1883, allowing transportation of Azeri oil through the port of Batumi. In 1899, the Kars–Gyumri–Tbilisi railway connection between Georgia and Armenia was established. The Khashuri to Borjomi link was built in 1894, with the 900 mm (2 ft 11 7/16 in) Borjomi to Bakuriani narrow-gauge line operational from 1902, to serve the higher level skiing community. The Kakheti railway branch line was completed in 1915.

The second major development of Georgian railways was due to rapid industrialisation and need for better distribution of agricultural products, including tea, citrus and wine produce. This resulted in the construction of the branch lines to: Natanebi-Ozurgeti (1924); Brotseula-Tskaltubo (1934), Senaki-Ingiri-Gali (1930), Gali-Ochamchire-Sokhumi (1938), Gori-Tskhinvali (1940). The construction of the Sokhumi-Adler allowing direct connection to the Russian Railways network started during World War II (later Soviet Railways), and was in full operation by 1949.

The Marabda to Akhalkalaki line opened on 31 December 1986.

The rail connection between Kars and Tbilisi via Gyumri (Alexandropol, Leninakan) that began in 1889 ended in 1993 with the closing of the Turkish-Armenian border.

=== Modernisation ===
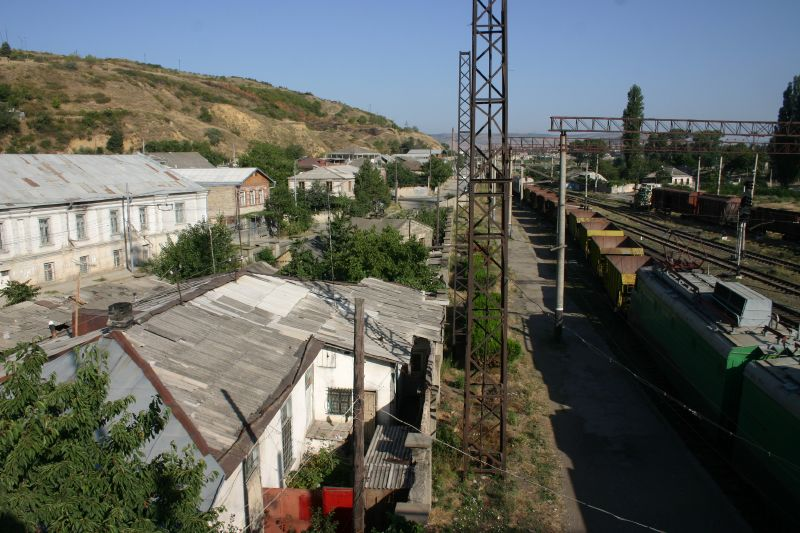
Gori station, showing freight yard in 2006

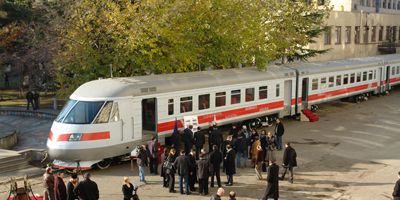
One of the present day Georgian Railway passenger trains

Previous Georgian Railway logo used from 1991 until 2016

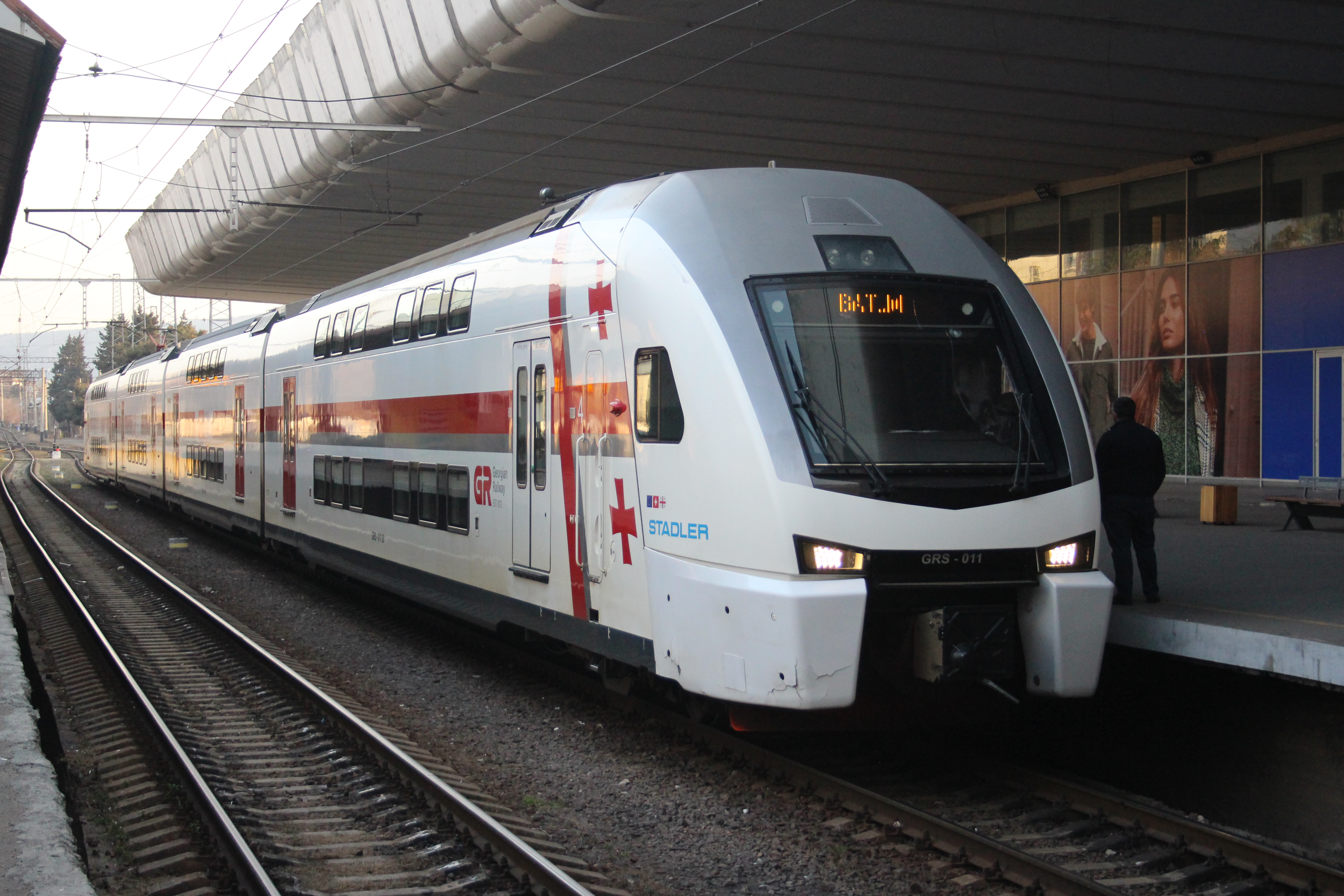
A new Stadler KISS next to the recently revamped Tbilisi station building

Following the dissolution of the Soviet Union, the Georgian Government took control of many of the key assets of the former Soviet Railways in the former Georgian SSR and undertook an aggressive privatisation campaign. The railway assets of Georgia were formed into the new 100% government-owned company JSC Georgian Railway – the biggest employer in the country (12,700 employees), which operates under the public law of the Enterprise Management Agency, part of the Ministry of Economic Development. It is charged with both management and maintenance of the rail infrastructure, as well as all operations of passenger and freight services. The team which forms the management body consist of The Assembly of Partners, the Supervisory Board and the Board of Directors. Company revenue in 2014 was $US287 million with a high EBITDA margin of 48.9%, debt was $US560 million. More than 95% of revenue comes from freight operations, more than half of which is transit.

Until 2004 Georgian Railway had been significantly affected by corruption. On the one hand, modernization and maintenance of the railway were neglected; for example, out of 11,000 rail cars, only 7,000 were in operation. On the other hand, the football stadium of Lokomotiv Tbilisi, the team of Georgian Railway, had one of the most modern sports sites in the country. General manager Akaki Chkhaidze was arrested in 2004 and spent several months in custody, before he redeemed himself for 3 million US dollars.

The railway company was restructured in the same year, and the general manager became subordinate to a supervisory board. From June 2004 until October 2005 David Onoprishvili, a former finance minister and a professor at Vanderbilt University in Nashville, Tennessee, was general manager.

As part of a modernization program, 2,445 employees were laid off, while wages for remaining employees were increased by about 17 percent. Tariffs for goods (freight) transport were lowered, while modernized, air-conditioned rail cars and express services were launched for passengers, including four Stadler passenger trains. A program of new and renovated station buildings commenced in 2006. The station building of the Tbilisi central station, excluding the rail infrastructure, was reconstructed and officially inaugurated in May 2010. The stations Makhinjauri (a suburb of Batumi) and Kobuleti also received new station buildings.

The 63 kilometres (39 mi) long Zestaponi–Moliti–Khashuri section (“Gorges” section) is a part of the main Georgian railway line across mountainous terrain, with very steep gradient and tight curves. The track alignment imposes very low speeds on the line, and it leads to various operational problems. Currently it takes ca. 1.5 hours for a passenger train to cover the section, and much longer for freight trains because of brakes overheating. For this reason, the company is modernizing the section in order to increase capacity, reduce travel time, and improve safety as well as railway operation. Along this section of track several new tunnels, will be built, of which the new ca. 8.4 kilometres (5.2 mi) T9 tunnel will be the longest rail tunnel in Georgia. The T9 tunnel will consist of two parallel tubes connected with cross passages at intervals of 300 m. The project is planned to be completed in late 2019. After the completion of the tunnel, travel time for passenger trains on the Tbilisi - Batumi route will be reduced by 40 minutes.

== Infrastructure ==
Georgian Railway

Technical
- Track gauge: 1,520 mm (4 ft 11 27/32 in)
- Length: 1,576 km (979 mi)

Other
- Website: www.railway.ge

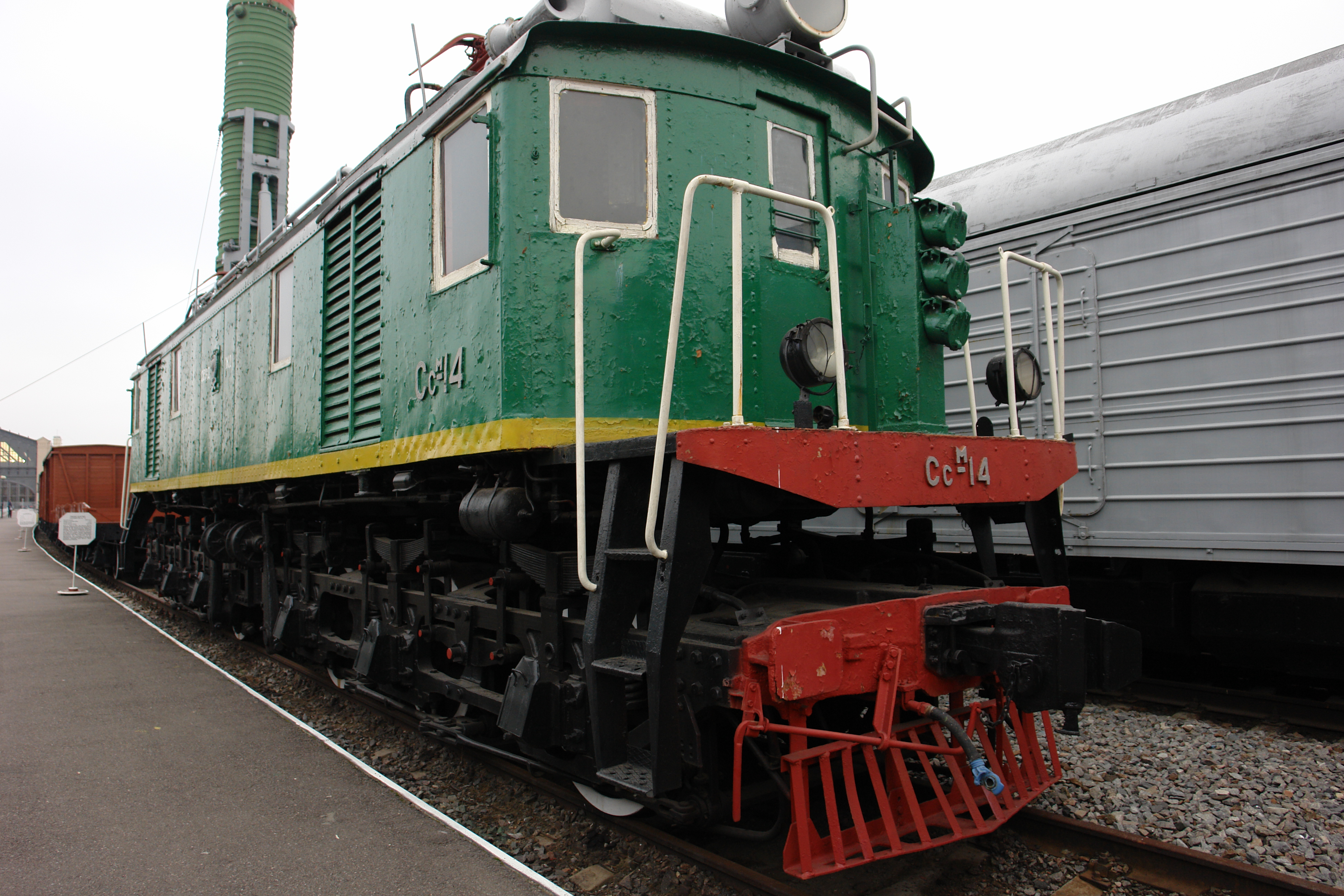
A preserved Class Ss locomotive of 1933, built for the Surami pass

Due to the challenging mountainous geography of Georgia, railway engineers have often been faced with some difficult challenges. In 1890, the dual tracking of the Tsipa tunnel was completed, allowing faster passage of east–west traffic.

On August 16, 1932, for the first time in the USSR, the first electric traction train ran in the Surami pass. The General Electric Company produced the initial eight electric locomotives of Class S for the service, followed by an additional 21 Class Ss built by the Kolomna and Dinamo works between 1932 and 1934. By November 1967 all Georgian railway was electrified, including the Borjomi-Bakuriani narrow-gauge line. (Some lines are no longer electrically operated due to political and economic instability and war, particularly in Abkhazia and South Ossetia.)

Post World War II, from 1946 the USSR army engineers with the prospect of connection to their system introduced modern communications, automatisation and Automatic Block Signalling systems. This was followed by the introduction of on train and guard radio communication systems, a process which was completed by 1949.

=== Rolling stock ===
At Georgia independence, Georgian Railway operated Soviet trains. Maintenance, repair and modernisation were performed at "Elmavalmshenebeli" plant in Tbilisi and "Carriage-Building Company" in Rustavi.

In 2009 Georgian Railway took delivery of the first of an order of eight inter-city EMUs produced by CSR Nanjing Puzhen Rolling Stock, China, at a cost of US$6M each. The 3 kV dc trains have a maximum speed of 130 km/h and each four-car set seats a total of 300 passengers in first and second class accommodation.

In 2016 four double-decker electric trains, model ESh2, of the Swiss company Stadler Rail AG were ordered at a cost of US$11M each. The 3 kV DC trains have a maximum speed of 160 km/h and each four-car set seats a total of 530 passengers in business class, first and second class accommodation.

As of 2022, there were 176 locomotives and 4,469 freight cars in service.

==== Gallery ====
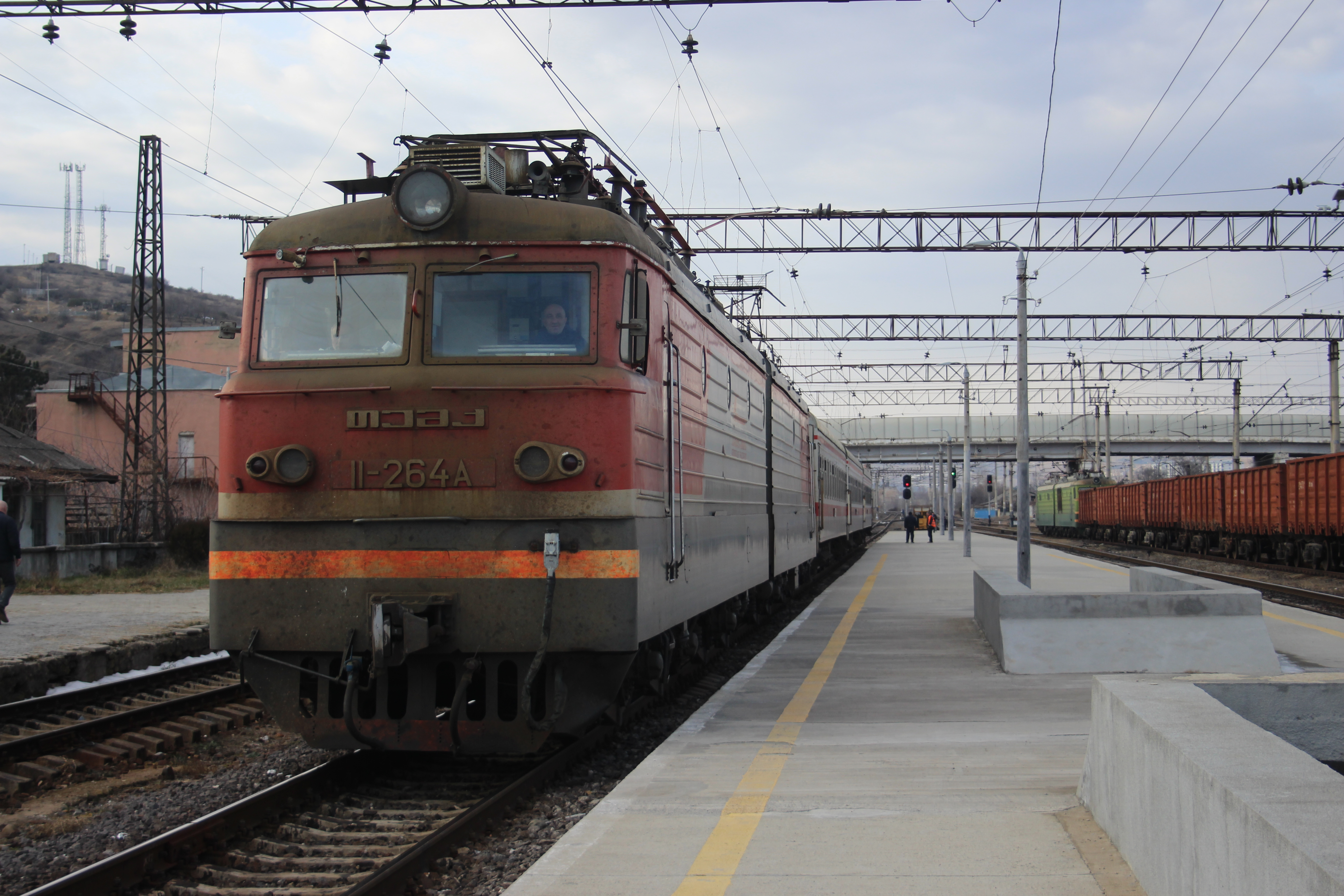
VL11 electric locomotive

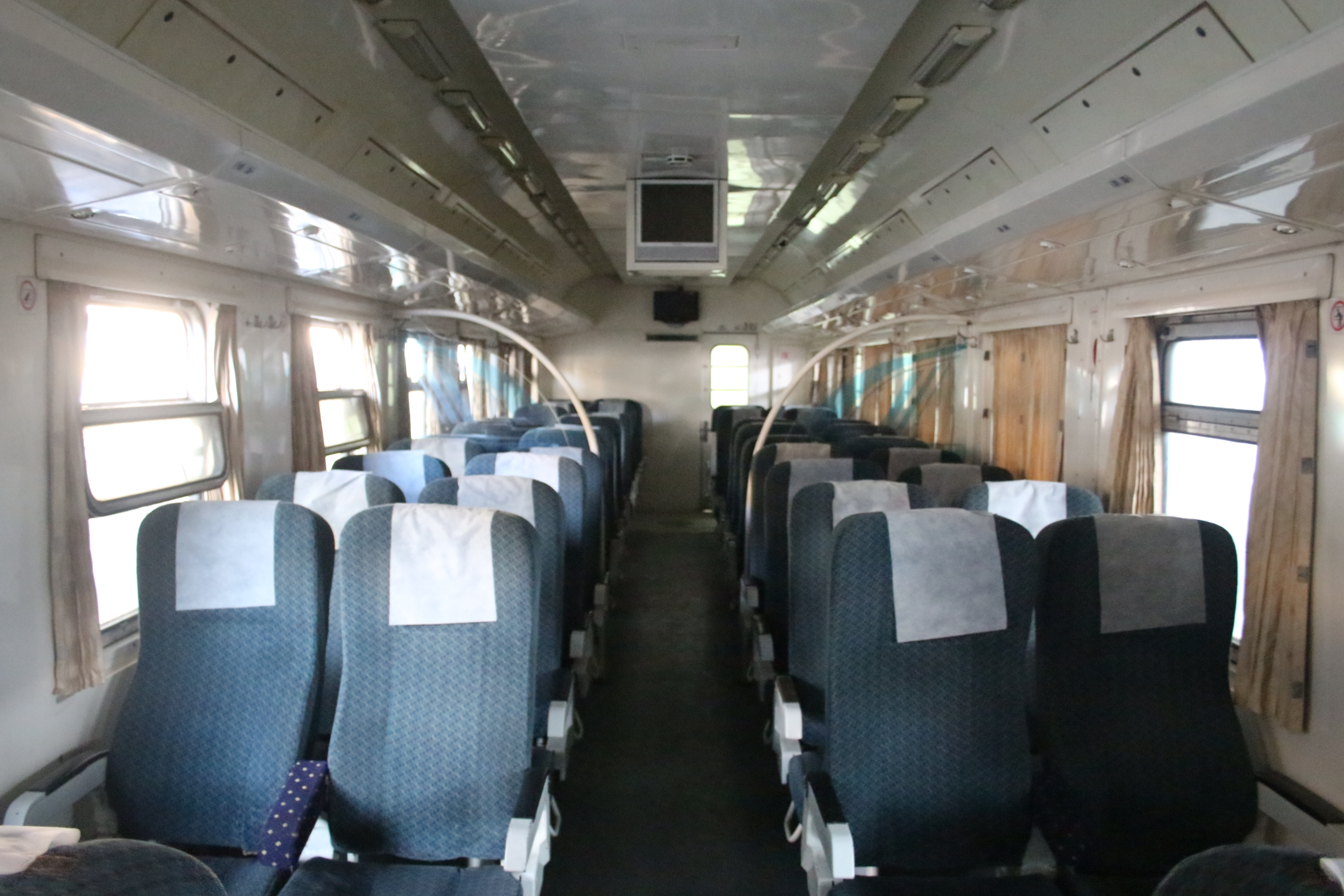
Seated coach interior

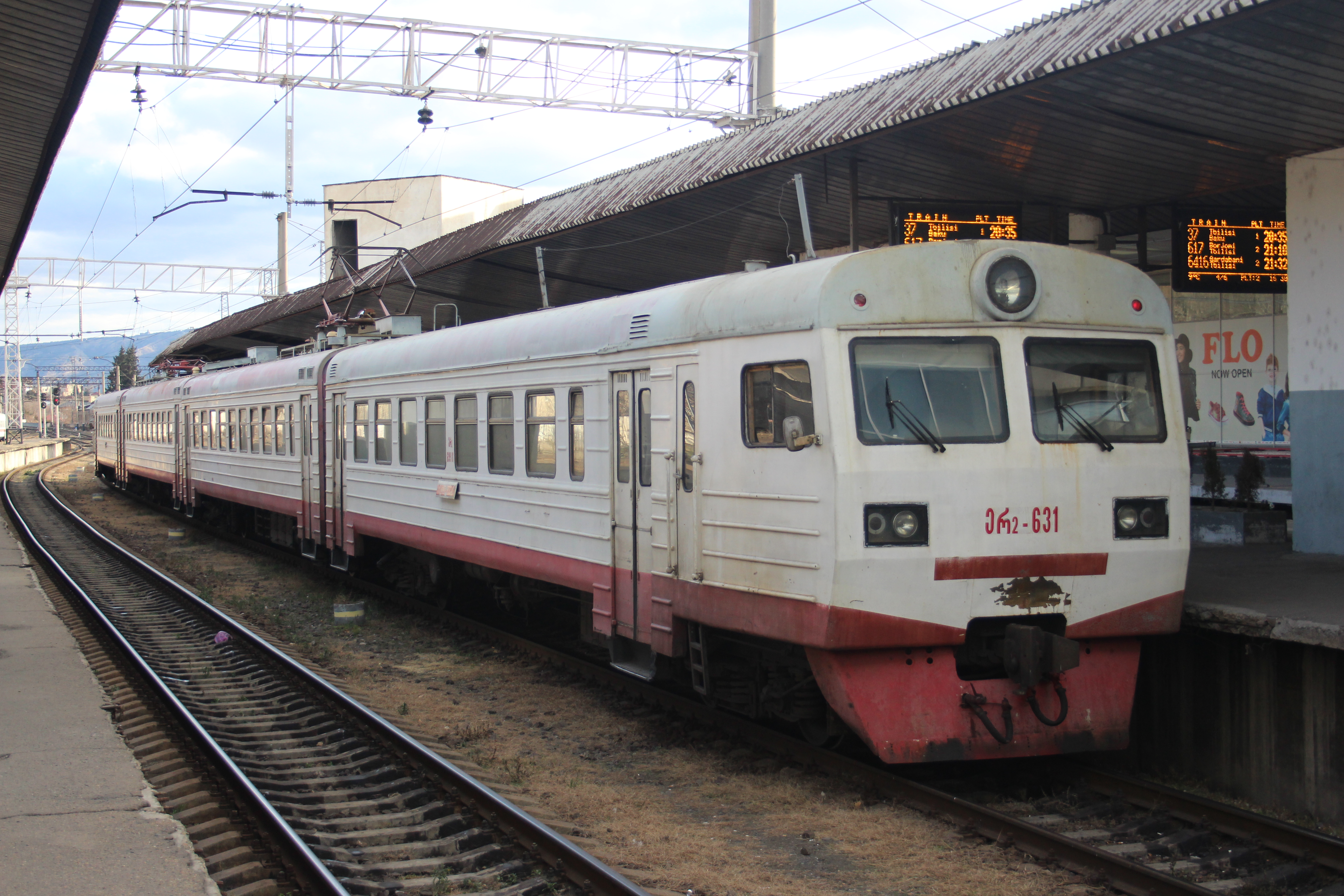
ER2 electric multiple unit

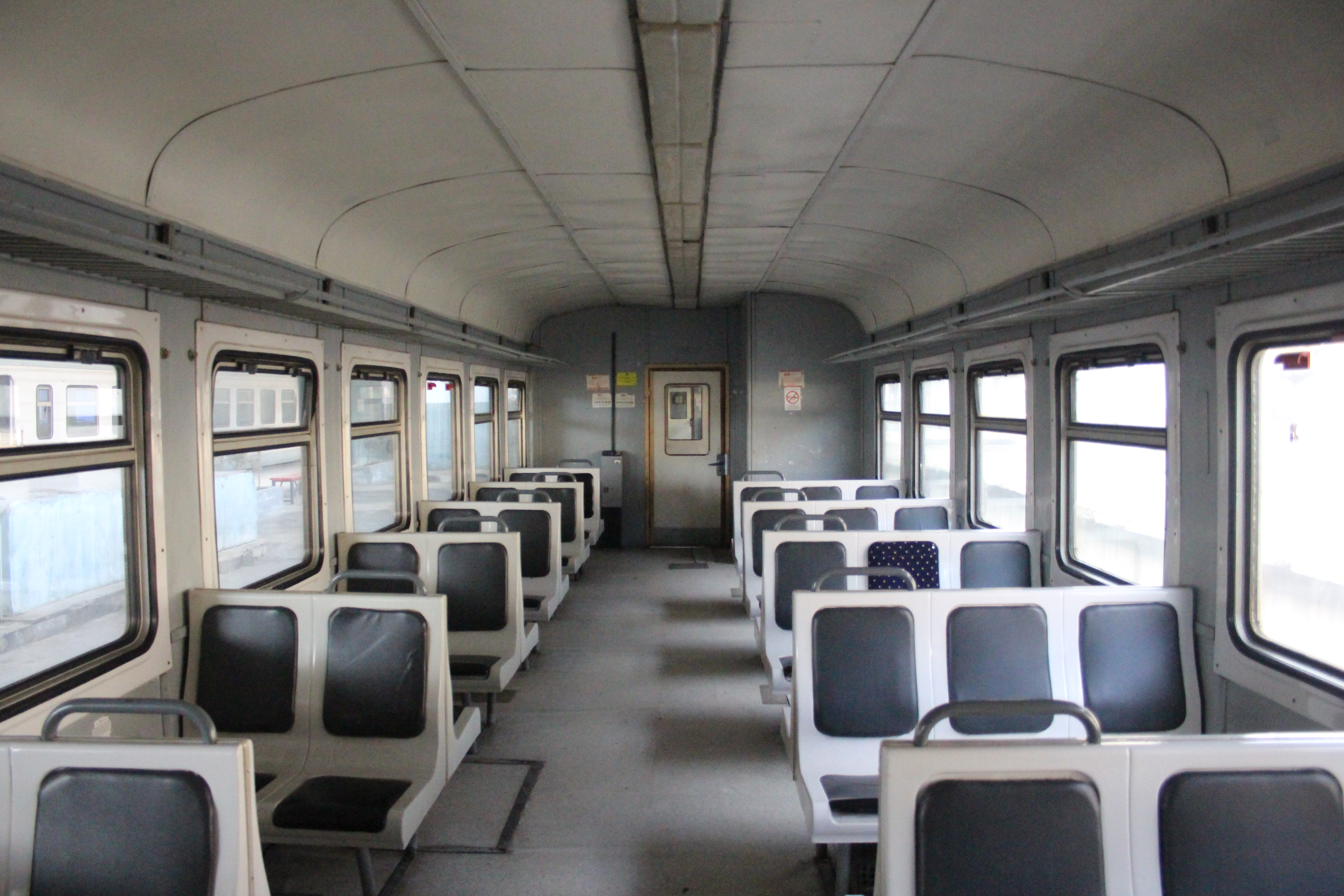
ER2 unit interior

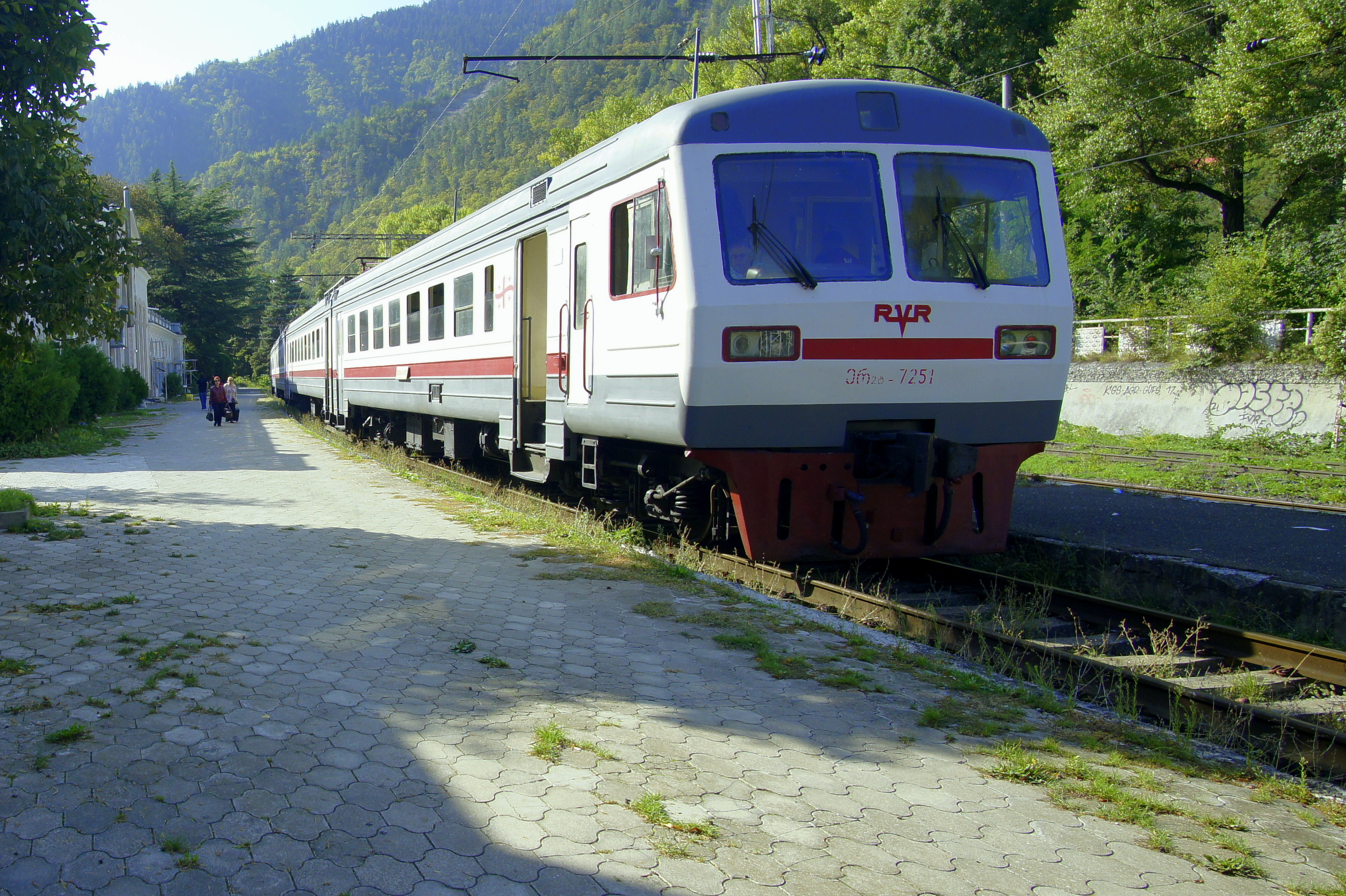
ER2T

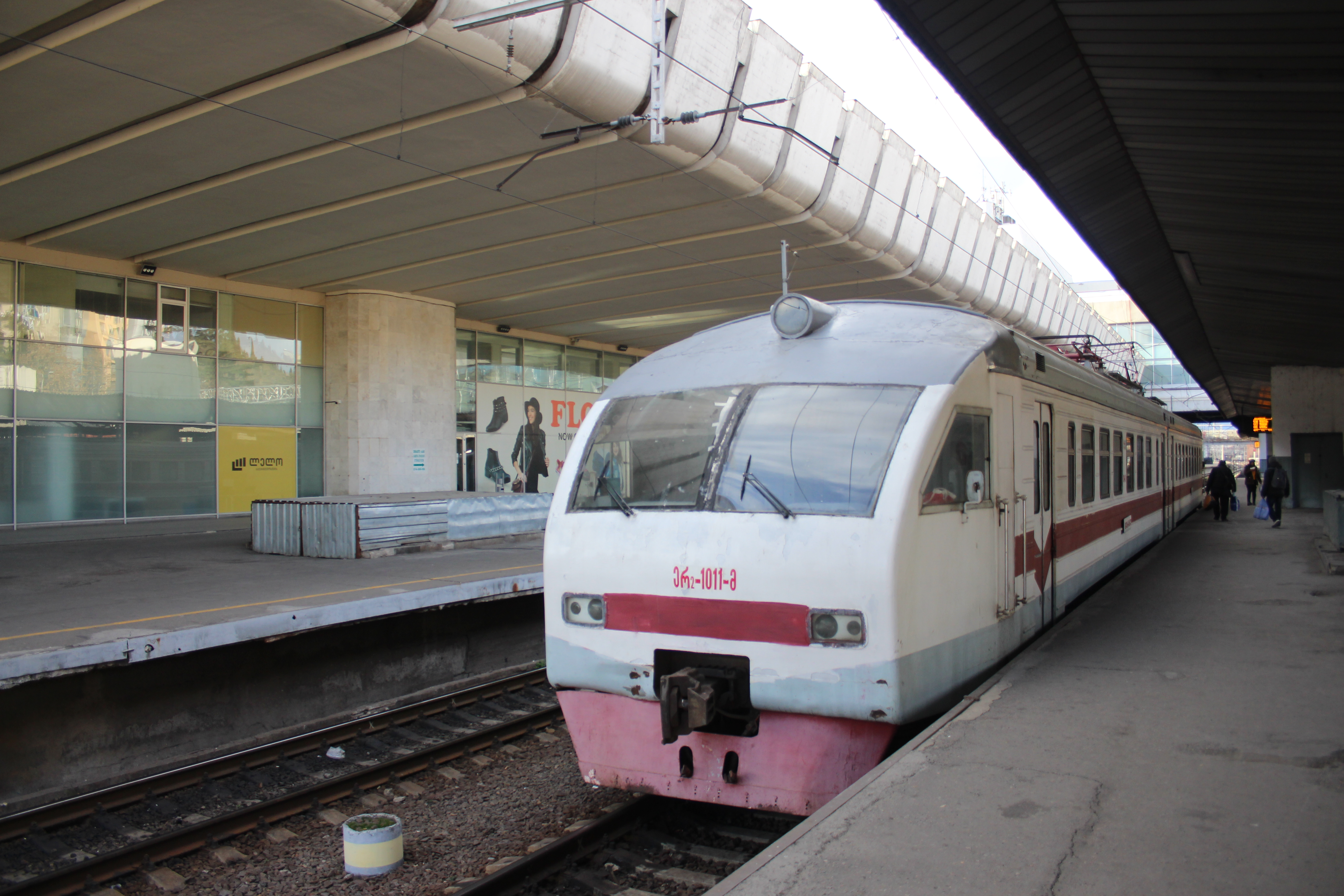
ER2M electric multiple unit

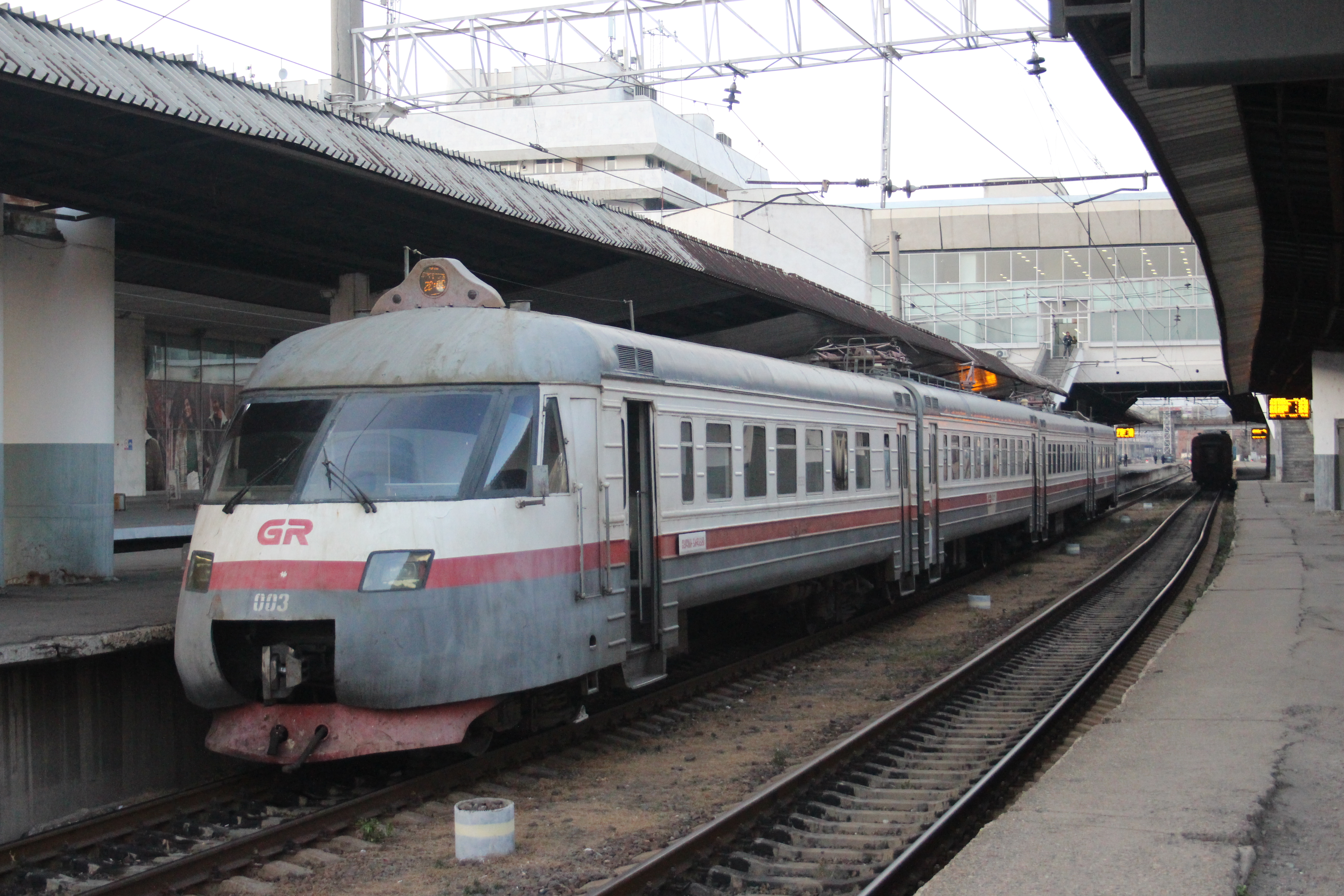
ES electric multiple unit

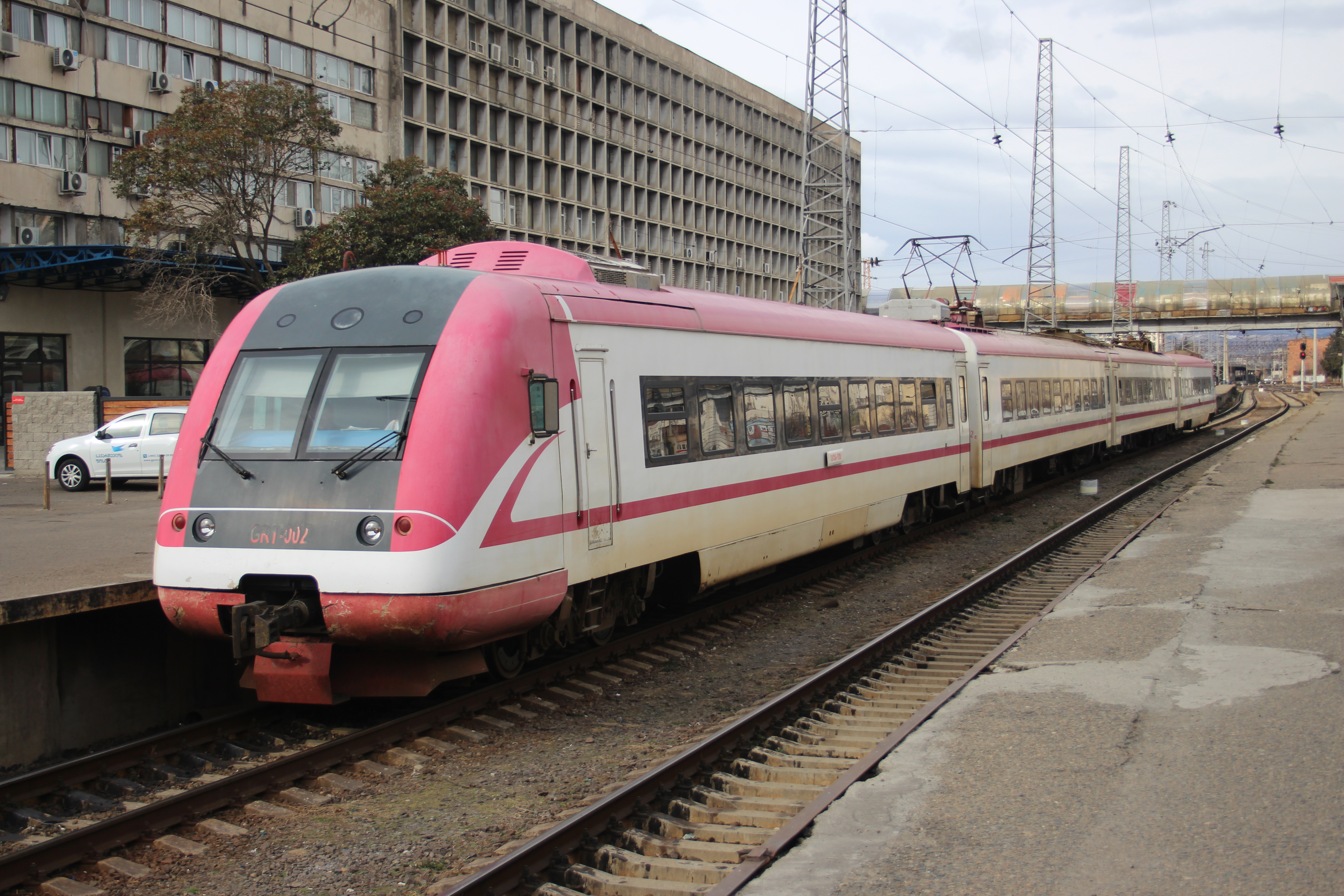
VMK electric multiple unit

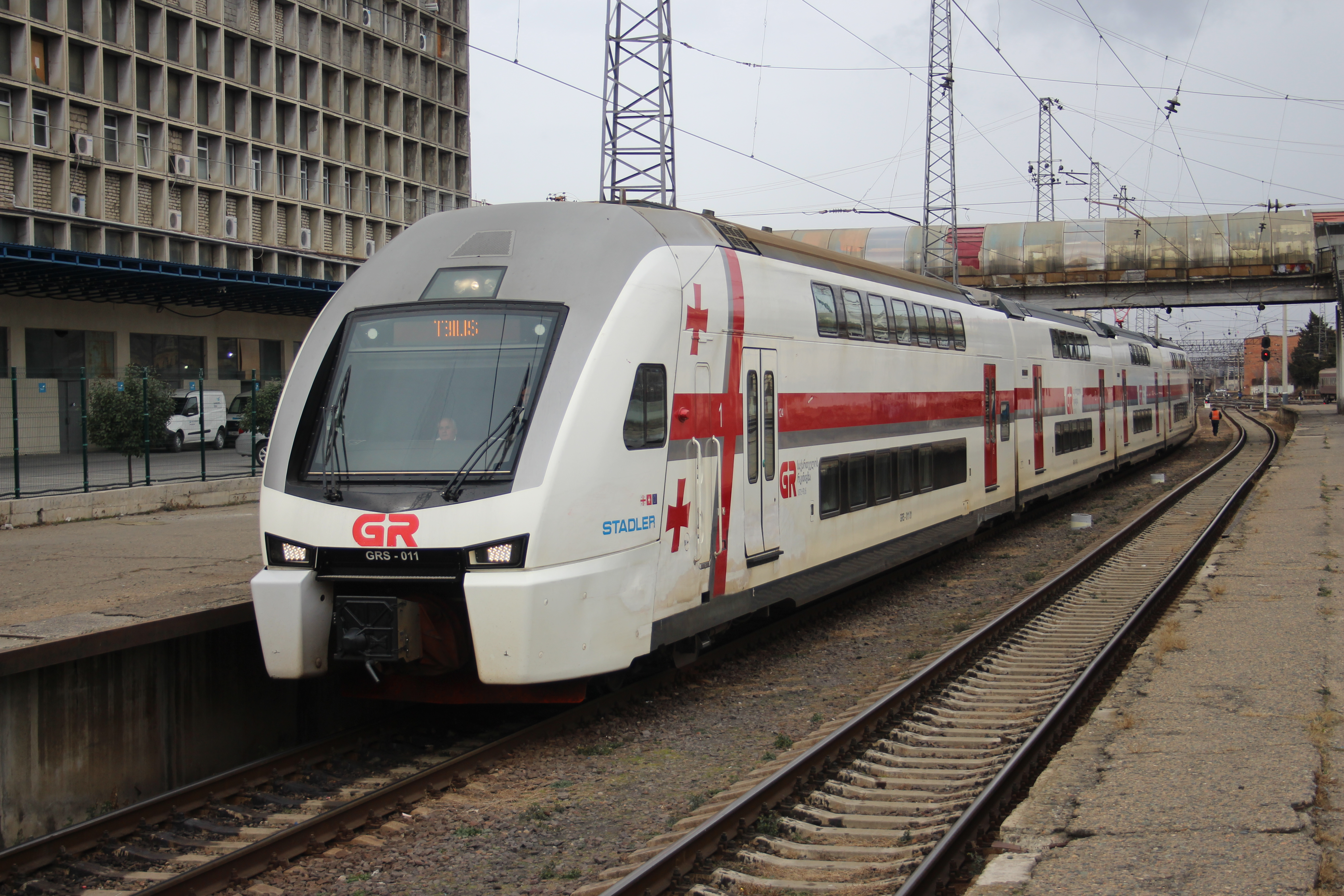
GRS (ESh2) electric multiple unit

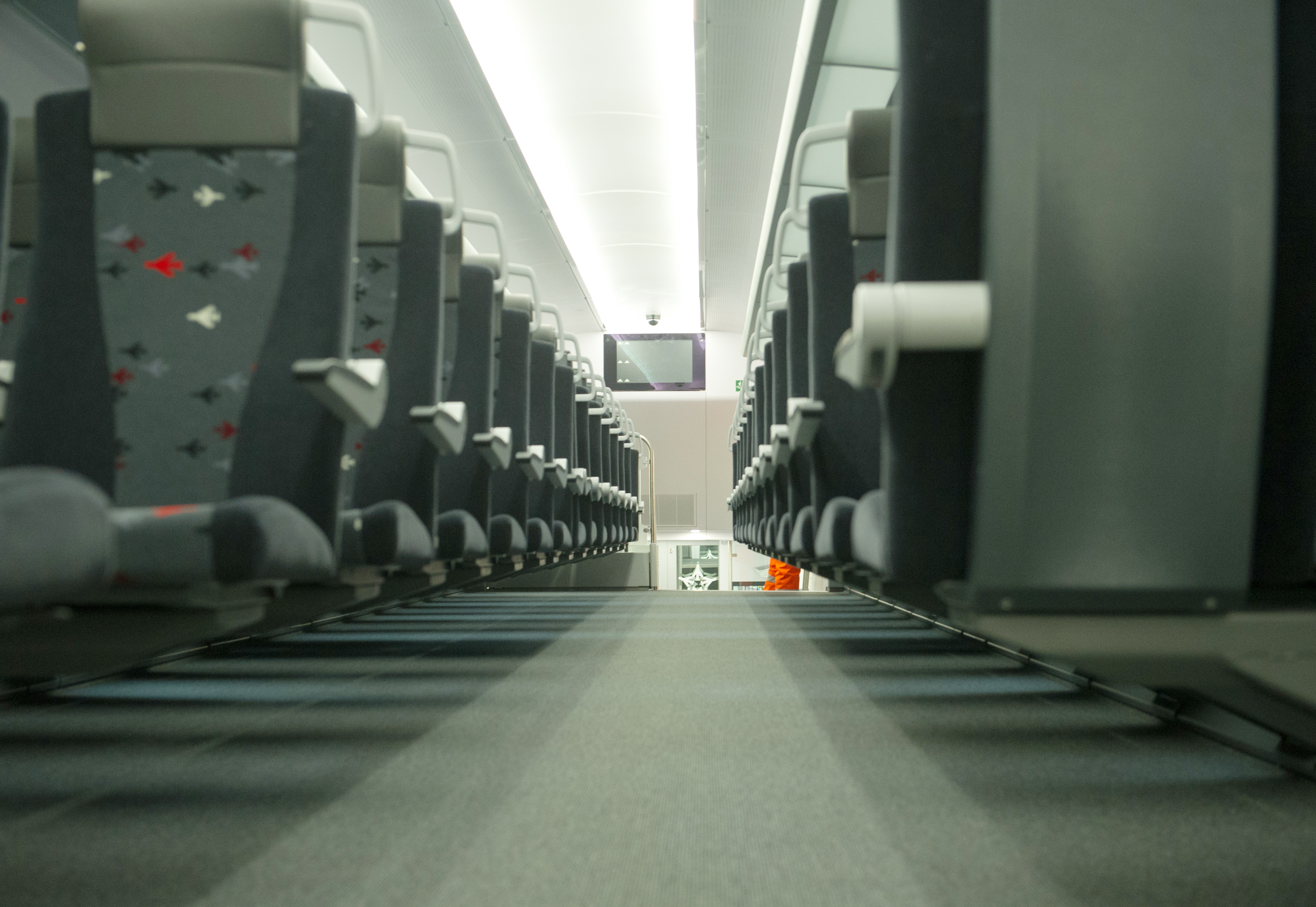
GRS (ESh2) unit interior

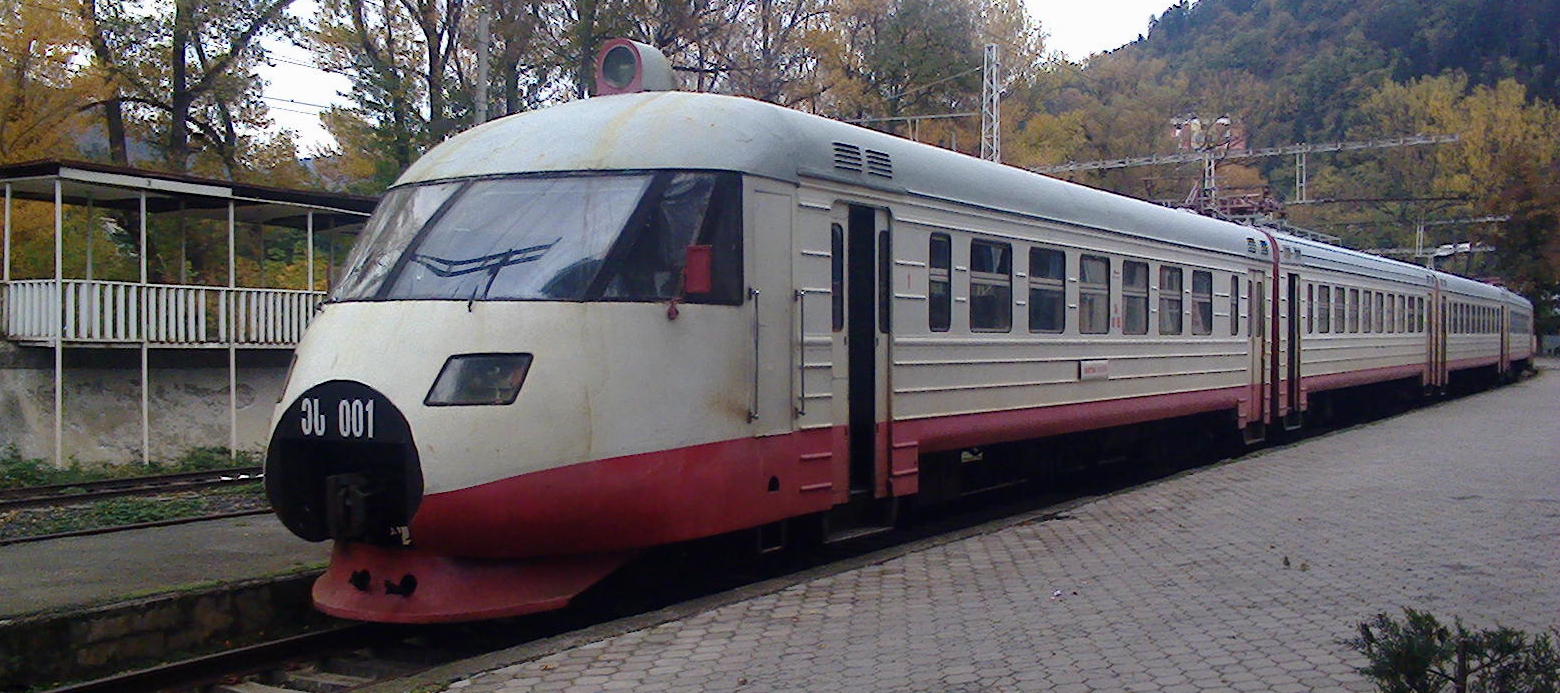
Georgian Rail ES-01, at Borjomi train station

== Incidents ==
Following the 2008 South Ossetia war, Russian army forces entered parts of Georgia and damaged key Georgian assets. This included a railway bridge near the western Georgian town of Kaspi, and application of mines to the mainline west of Gori resulted in the complete derailment and resultant fire of an oil train.

The lines located in Abkhazia and South Ossetia are not under the control of the Georgian Railway. Lines from Nikozi to Tskhinvali (5 km) and from Ochamchire to Enguri River are not in use; much of the track and overhead on these two lines have been looted, and stations such as Gali have been destroyed or heavily damaged. Lines from Psou River to Ochamchire and from Ochamchire to Tkvarcheli are operated by separatist Abkhazian Railways.

== Railway links with adjacent countries ==
Railways in the South Caucasus

- Azerbaijan – open – 1,520 mm (4 ft 11 27/32 in) (Tbilisi-Baku line)
- Armenia – open – 1,520 mm (4 ft 11 27/32 in) (Tbilisi–Gyumri–Yerevan line)
- Turkey – open – standard-gauge line (Akhalkalaki–Kars); this standard-gauge line is connected with Georgia's 1,520 mm (4 ft 11 27/32 in) railway at Akhalkalaki.
- Russia – closed – 1,520 mm (4 ft 11 27/32 in) – via the breakaway Abkhazia – de jure closed since the War in Abkhazia (1992–1993), de facto operates partly by Abkhazian Railway without track from Enguri to Ochamchire.

== Sponsorships ==
As of 2020, the company has been the official jersey sponsor of the Georgia men's national basketball team.

== Gallery of stations ==
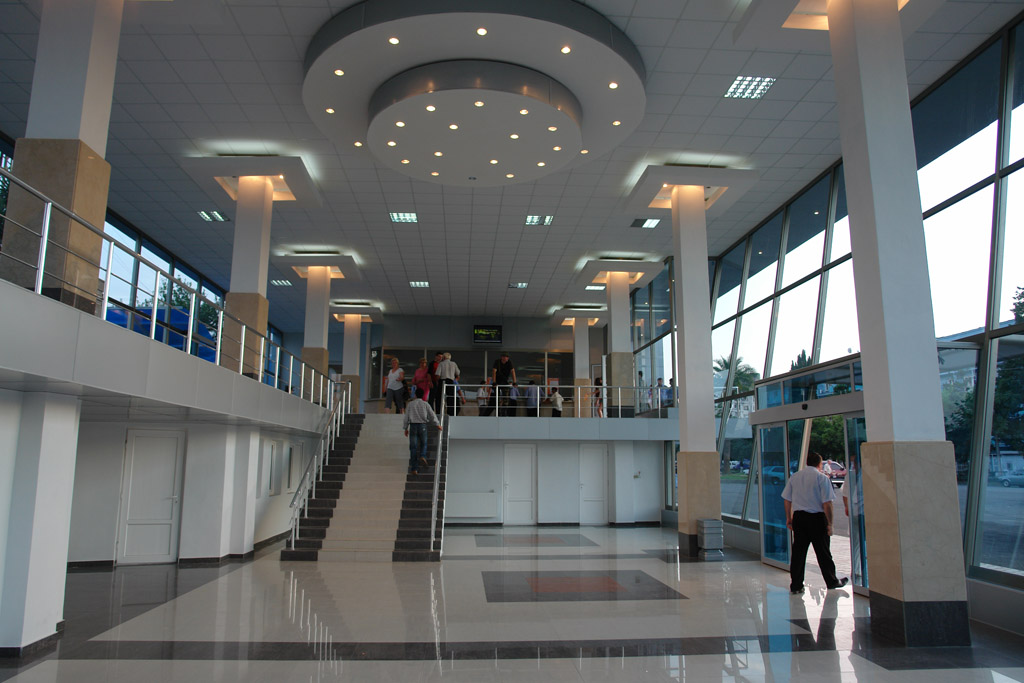
Station of Kobuleti

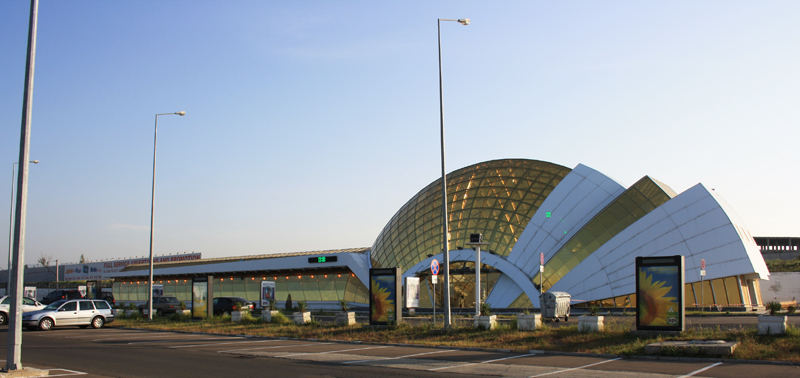
Airport station in Tbilisi

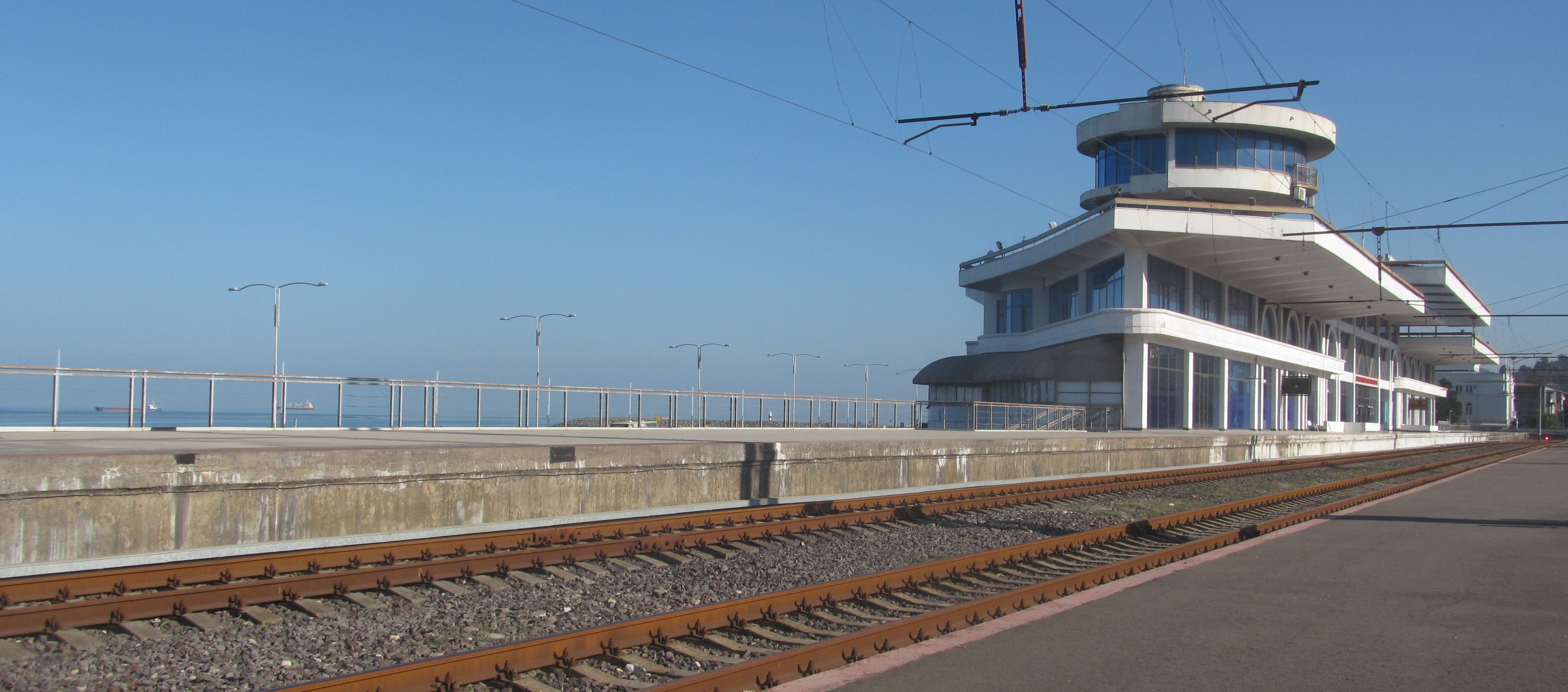
Station of Batumi

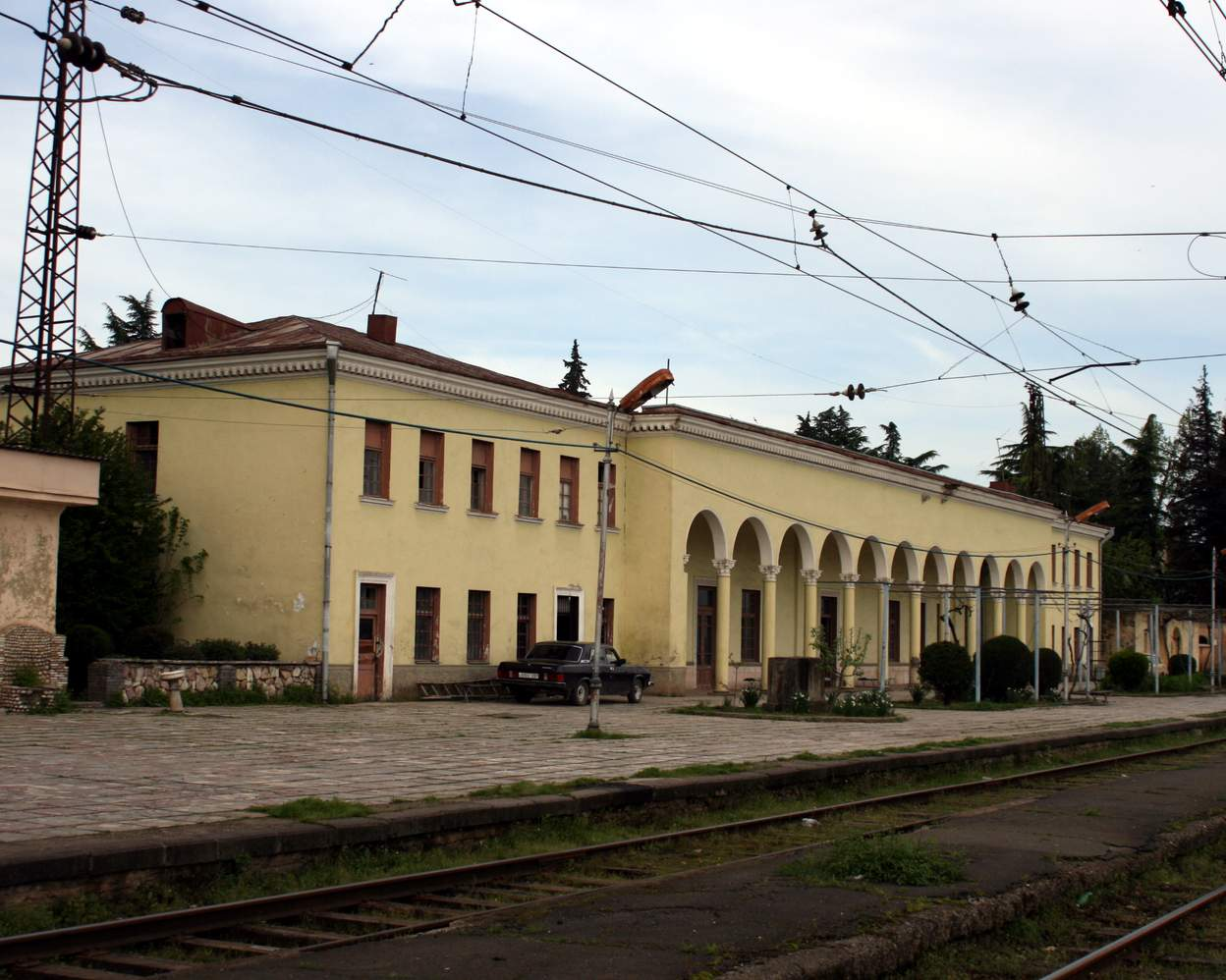
Station of Gurjaani

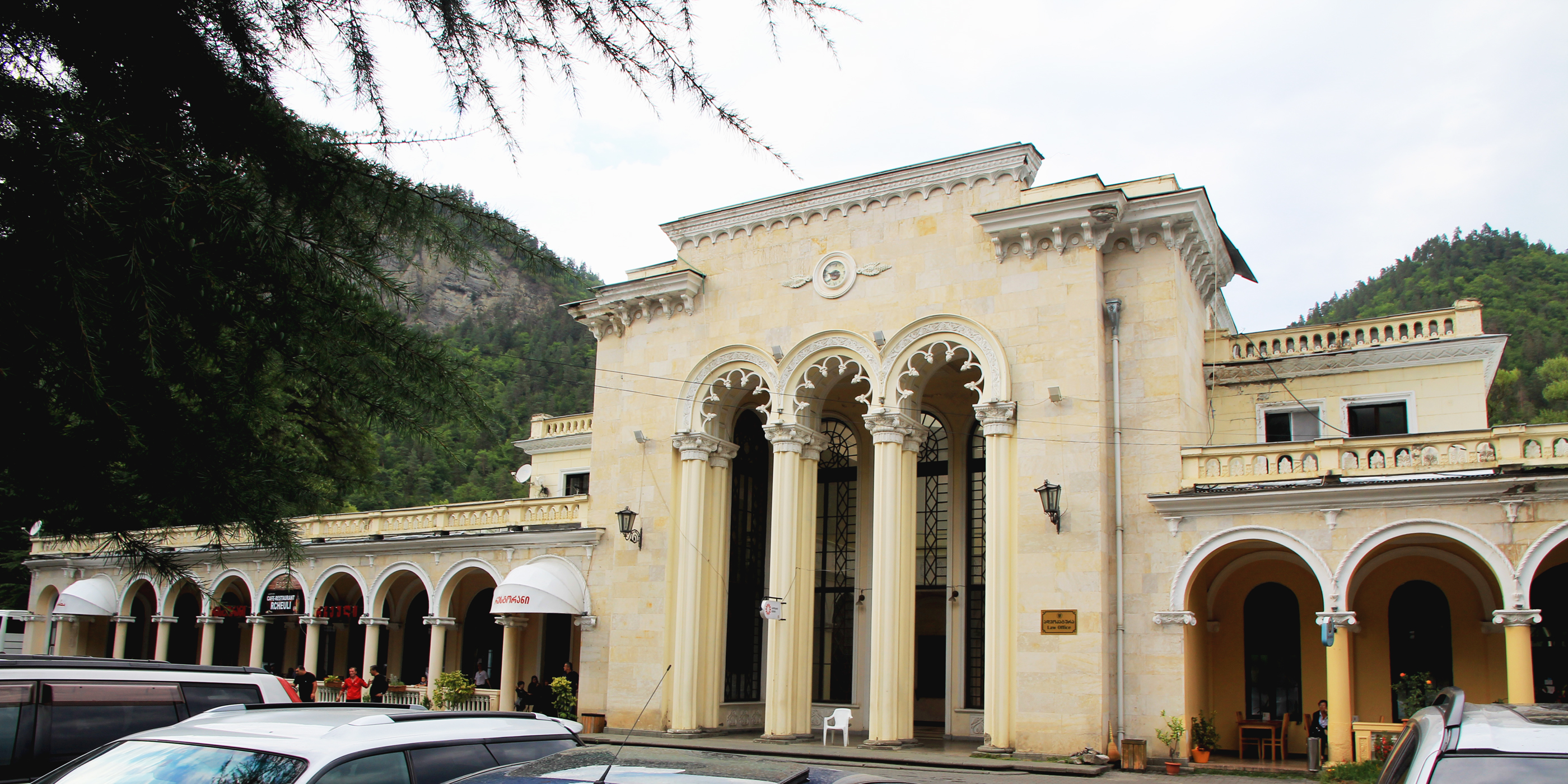
Station of Borjomi

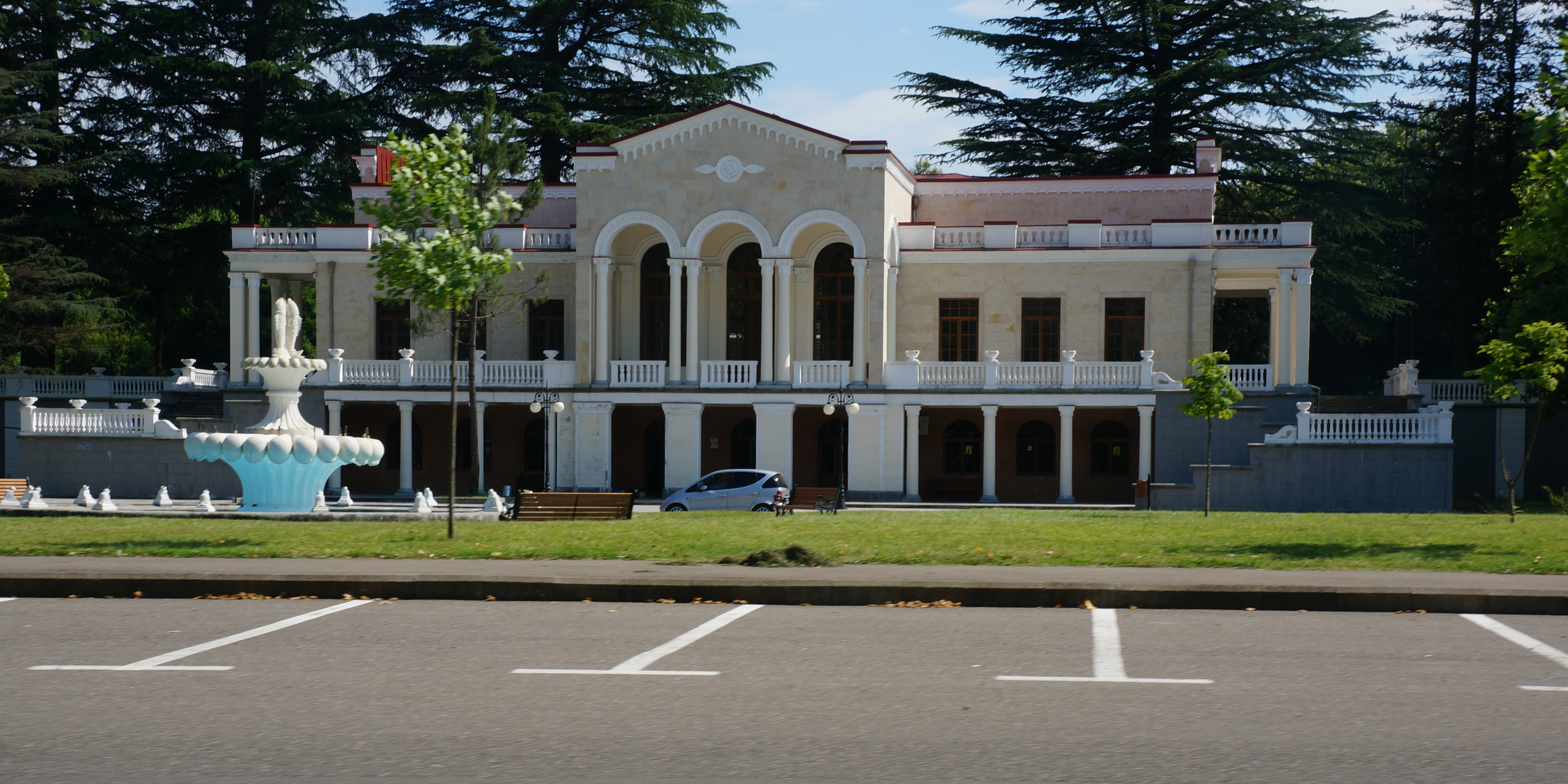
Station of Tskaltubo

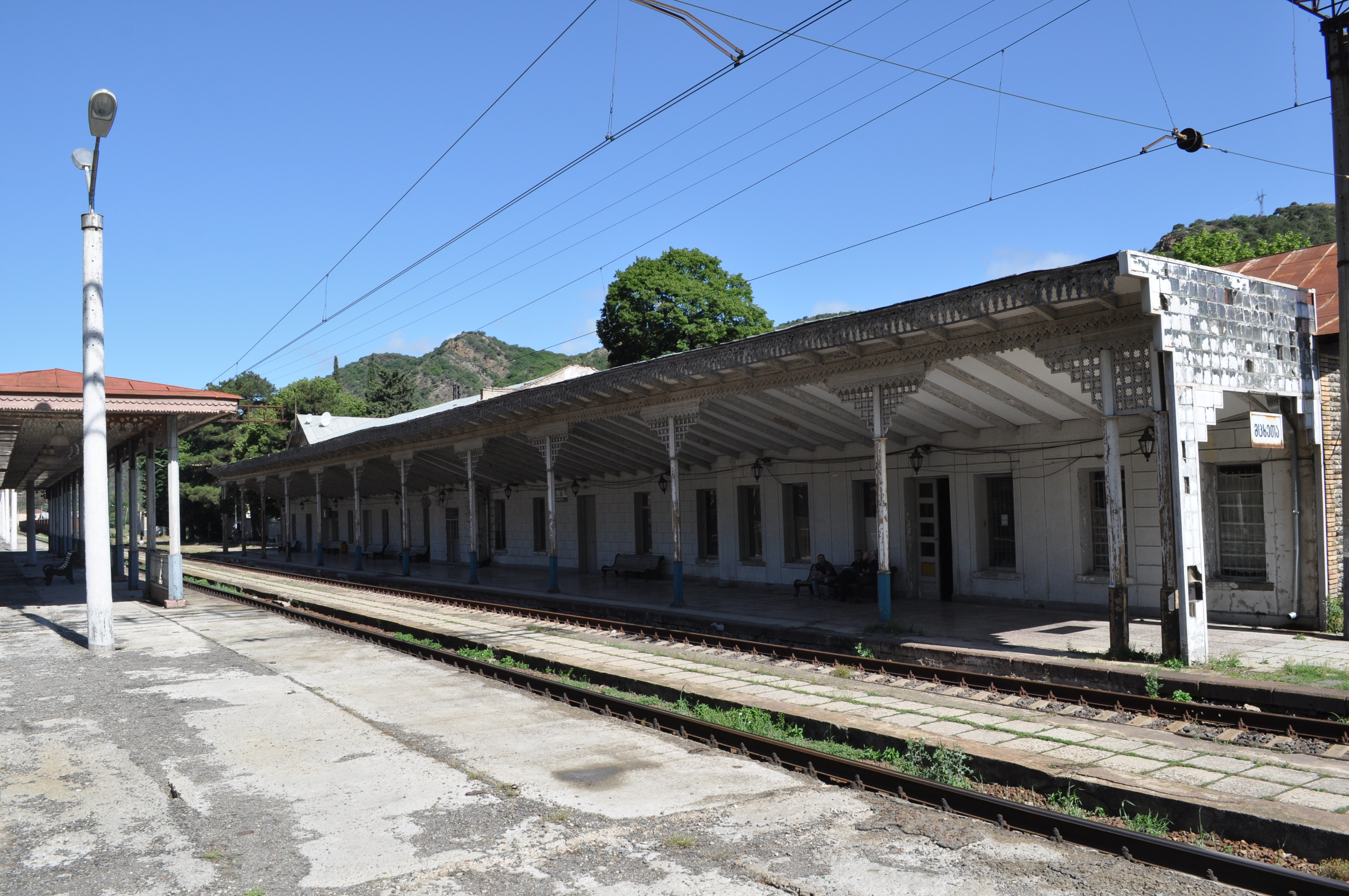
Station of Mtskheta

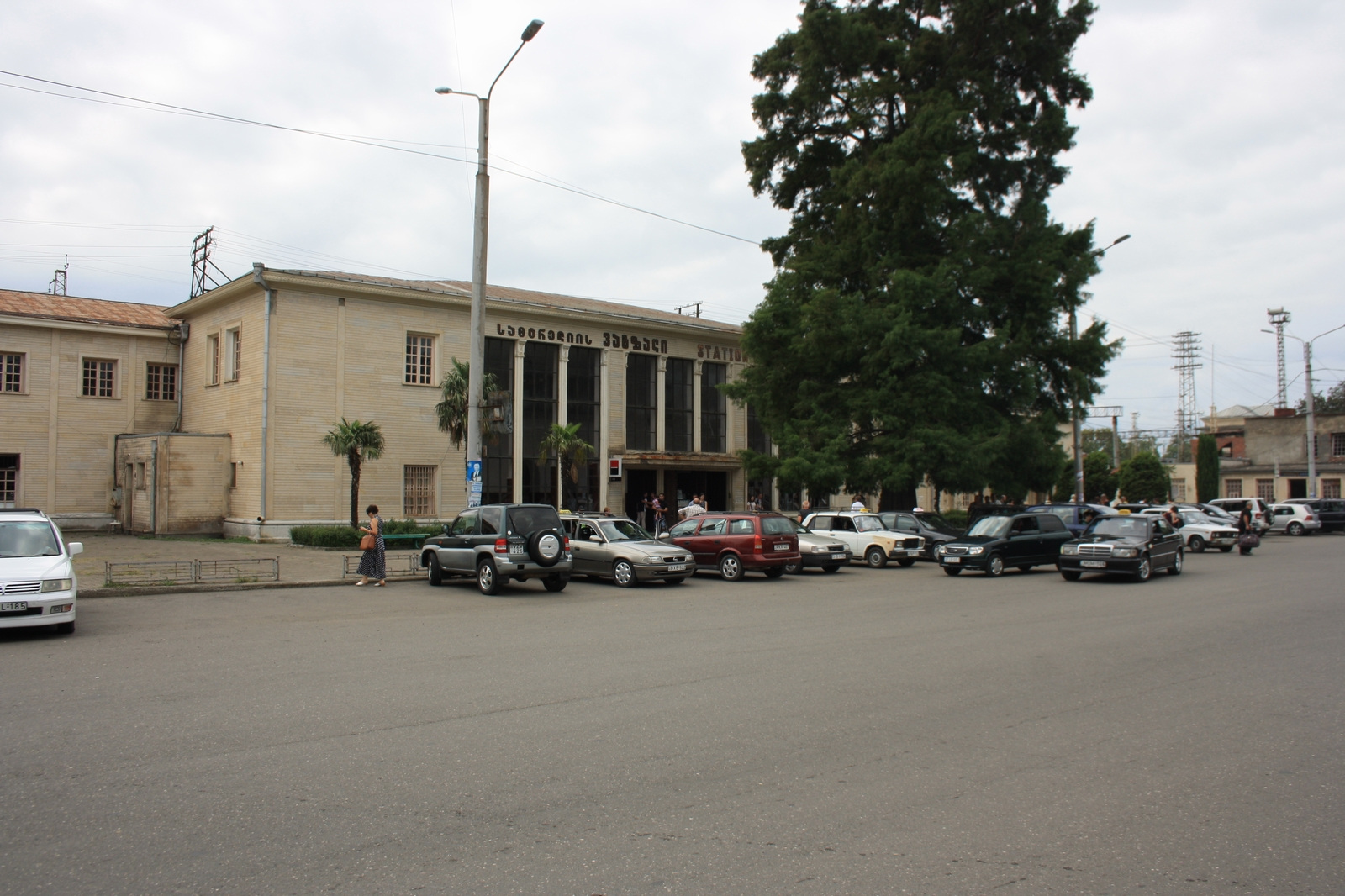
Station of Samtredia

== See also ==
- Transport in Georgia
- Kars–Tbilisi–Baku railway
