= Baku–Tbilisi–Kars railway =

Railway line in Azerbaijan, Georgia, and Turkey

Baku–Tbilisi–Kars Railway
- Baku–Tbilisi–Kars railway

Overview
- Status: Active
- Locale: Azerbaijan; Georgia; Turkey

History
- Opened: 30 October 2017; 8 years ago

Technical
- Line length: 826 kilometres (513 mi)
- Electrification: 25 kV 50 Hz AC overhead catenary

The Baku–Tbilisi–Kars (BTK), or Baku–Tbilisi–Akhalkalaki–Kars railway (BTAK), is a railway connecting Azerbaijan, Georgia and Turkey, which became operational on 30 October 2017 following several years of delays. The project was originally due to be completed by 2010, but was delayed to 2013, 2015, 2016, and, following a fifth trilateral meeting in February 2016, foreign ministers of the three countries announced that the railway would finally be completed in 2017.

Following the first test run by a passenger train from Tbilisi to Akhalkalaki on 27 September 2017, the BTK was inaugurated for cargo service on 30 October 2017, in a ceremony in Alyat hosted by the President of Azerbaijan Ilham Aliyev.

The Baku–Tbilisi–Kars project was intended to provide a rail corridor linking Azerbaijan to Turkey via Georgia whilst avoiding Armenia, following the closure of the Kars–Gyumri–Tbilisi railway in 1993, as a result of the first Nagorno-Karabakh War. The project also provided an additional rail route between China and Europe (via Central Asia) which avoided Russian territory. In late 2015, a goods train took only 15 days to travel from South Korea to Istanbul via China, Kazakhstan, Azerbaijan, and Georgia—considerably less time than a journey by sea. The line's initial annual freight capacity of 6.5 million tonnes is planned to increase to 17 million tonnes.

Regular cross-border passenger services on the corridor were delayed for several years by infrastructure upgrades, technical challenges, and border restrictions. While international passenger service between Azerbaijan and Georgia was reinstated in May 2026, the newly built section crossing the border from Georgia into Turkey remains dedicated exclusively to freight traffic.

== Pre-existing railways ==
The (Poti–)Tbilisi–Baku railway (the Transcaucasus Railway) was completed in 1883, and has since remained the backbone of the South Caucasus's railway network.

By 1899, a branch line (Kars–Gyumri–Tbilisi railway) from Tbilisi to Marabda to Gyumri (then Alexandropol) to Kars was completed. Due to the poor state of relations between Armenia and Turkey, that line has been abandoned.

In 1986, the construction of a 160-kilometre (99 mi) branch railway line from Marabda (on the Tbilisi-Gyumri line, 23 kilometers (14 mi) south of Tbilisi Junction) west to Akhalkalaki was completed. However, that fell into disuse at a later stage.

== History and construction ==
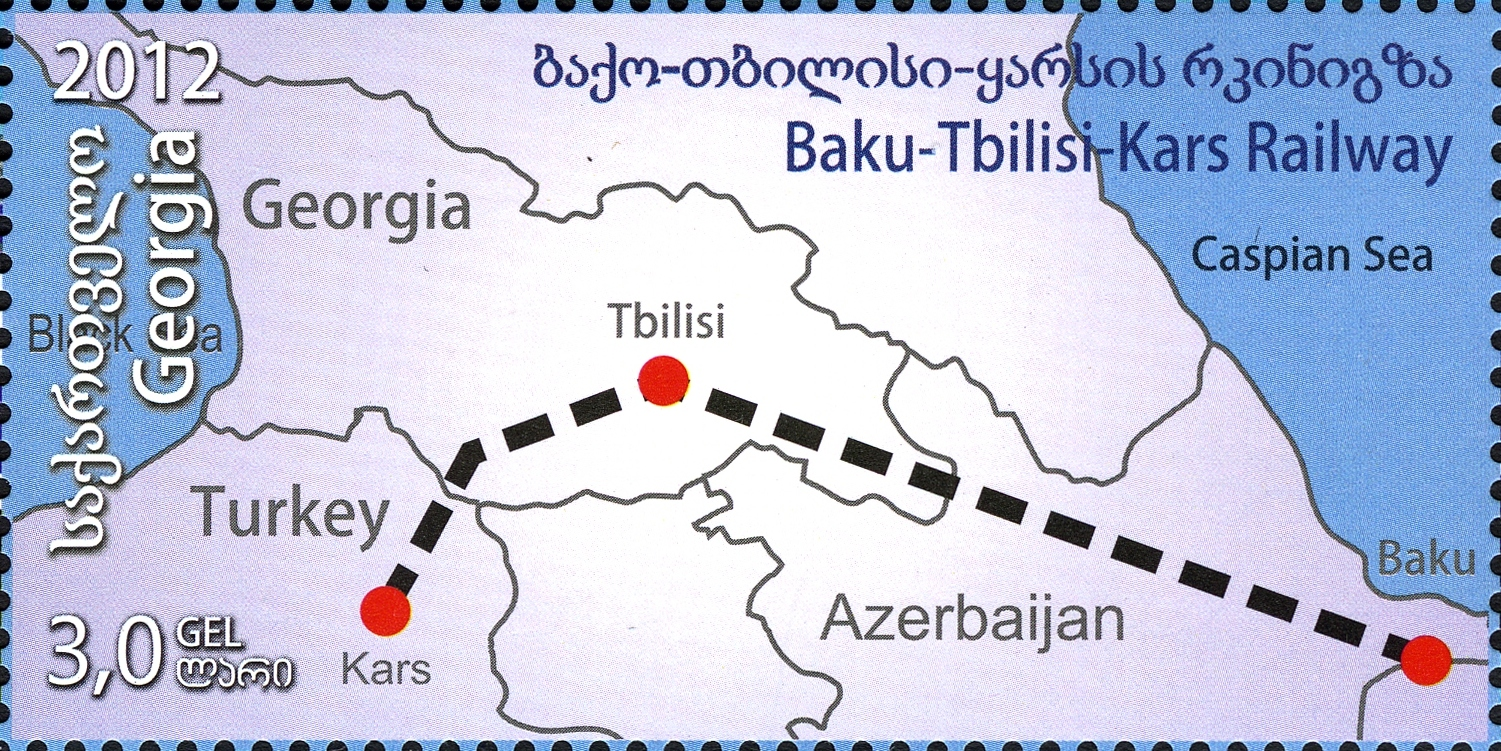
Kars–Tbilisi–Baku railway on Georgian stamp, 2013

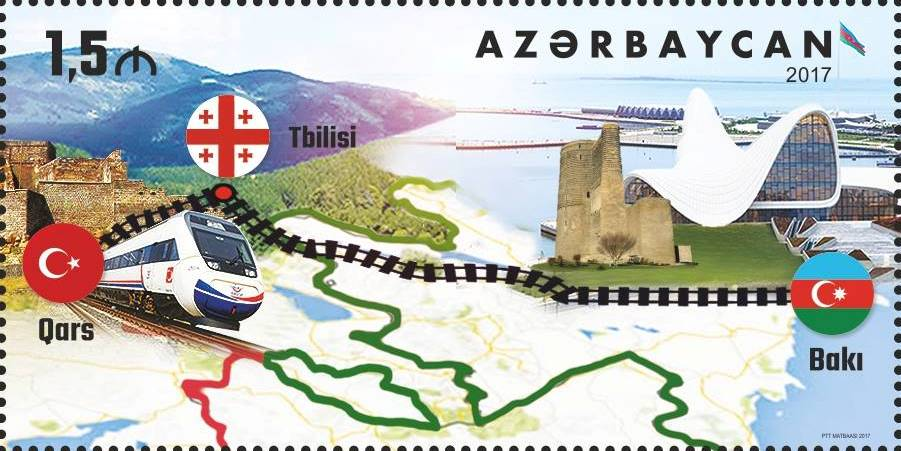
Stamp of Azerbaijan 2017

In 1993, Turkey closed its border with Armenia—closing the Kars–Gyumri–Tbilisi railway, which goes through Armenia—to support Azerbaijan in its conflict with Armenia following the first Nagorno-Karabakh War. A railway line project between Azerbaijan and Turkey through Georgia, intended to provide an alternative to the closed route, was first discussed in July 1993.

A multilateral accord to build the link was signed by the three countries in January 2005. Because of a lack of funding at this time, this project was more or less abandoned. However, during the inauguration of the Baku–Tbilisi–Ceyhan pipeline in May 2005, the presidents of Azerbaijan, Georgia and Turkey again raised the possibility of building a railroad between their three countries.

For the construction of the railway on Georgian territory, Azerbaijan agreed to provide a US$220 million loan to Georgia, repayable in 25 years, with an annual interest rate of 1%. A concessional loan agreement for that financing was signed between a Georgian state-owned company Marabda-Karsi Railroad LLC and Azerbaijan. By September 2007, the State Oil Fund of Azerbaijan had allocated the first US$50 million instalment of this loan. In 2011, Azerbaijan allocated to the Georgian government an additional $575 million at the rate of 5% per annum. The European Union and the United States declined to assist in the financing or promoting of the line because they saw it as being designed to bypass Armenia, and supported the reopening of the Kars-Gyumri-Tbilisi railway line instead, thanks in part to pressure on the US Congress from the Armenian lobby in the United States, such as the Armenia National Committee in America (ARMENPAC). The EU did later "welcome the new rail corridor".

In February 2007, Azerbaijan, Georgia, and Turkey signed a trilateral agreement in Tbilisi to launch the construction of the railroad that year. On 21 November 2007, the presidents of Azerbaijan (Ilham Aliyev), Georgia (Mikheil Saakashvili), and Turkey (Abdullah Gül) inaugurated the construction of the railroad at a ceremony at the Marabda junction, south of Tbilisi, and in July 2008, the first rails in Turkey began to be laid from Kars.

The Russo-Georgian War, as well as environmental problems, delayed the project from an originally projected completion date of 2010 to 2015 and, subsequently, later still.

In November 2014, Turkey's transport minister, Lütfi Elvan, said 83% of the project had been completed. According to estimates, the line will be capable of carrying 17 million tons of cargo and about three million passengers by 2030.

On 30 January 2015, the first test train ran along the new Georgian stretch of track between Akhalkalaki and Kartsakhi, in the presence of the Georgian Minister of Economy and Sustainable Development, Giorgi Kvirikashvili, and the Azerbaijani Minister of Transport, Ziya Mammadov. According to Kvirikashvili, "major construction works on 180 kilometres (110 mi) railway are actually completed, and every effort will be made to complete Baku–Tbilisi–Kars railway works in late 2015." In September 2015 it was announced in Georgian media that service would not begin before an unspecified time in 2016.

The foreign ministers of Azerbaijan (Elmar Mammadyarov), Georgia (Mikheil Janelidze) and Turkey (Mevlüt Çavuşoğlu) held a fifth trilateral meeting in Georgia on 19 February 2016, during which they traveled to the new Georgia-Turkey border crossing at Kartsakhi/Çıldır, subsequently hailing the railway project as "historic" and noting its importance for the region in the context of the new Silk Road. A week before the foreign ministers met, a seventh meeting of the Baku–Tbilisi–Kars coordination council was held in Tbilisi, during which the Turkish and Azerbaijani transport ministers and the Georgian finance minister announced that the railway would be operational in 2017, after work on the Turkish section was completed.

== Opening ==
On 30 October 2017, the railway was officially inaugurated in the Alat Port of Baku, Azerbaijan, by the leaders of Azerbaijan, Turkey, Georgia, Kazakhstan and Uzbekistan. Representatives of TRACECA, international and financial organizations, and official delegations of Tajikistan and Turkmenistan, were among participants in the ceremony. The ceremony had been announced on 27 September by the Azerbaijani and Georgian ministers of foreign affairs, following the first test run by a passenger train from Tbilisi to Akhalkalaki.

In his speech at the opening ceremony of the railway, the President of Azerbaijan, Ilham Aliyev, said: "The Baku–Tbilisi–Kars railway is of great importance for the development of business and mutually beneficial cooperation. I am sure that the countries making the biggest contribution to regional cooperation – Azerbaijan, Georgia and Turkey – will always be together and support each other. Such giant projects as the Baku–Tbilisi–Kars railway further strengthen our unity and friendship." The 30 October date for the opening was chosen for symbolic reasons - it was that date in 1920 that Turkey captured Kars from the Armenian Republic.

The European Union welcomed the opening of the Baku–Tbilisi–Kars railway, referring to it as a major measure for transport interconnections channeling the European Union with Turkey, Azerbaijan, Georgia, and Central Asia. In the statement it is stated that this rail corridor will ensure a better network, create new business circumstances, and increase the quality of trade among the parties.

== Objectives and political issues ==
The key objective of the project was to improve economic relations between the three countries, and to gain direct foreign investment by connecting Europe and Asia. Some commentators in Armenia viewed the new route as an attempt by Azerbaijan to bypass Armenia and isolate it from regional economic projects. However, the route through Armenia was politically impossible due to the unresolved war between Armenia and Azerbaijan over the status of Nagorno-Karabakh.

According to Samuel Lussac, "[the project] will contribute to further regional cooperation between Azerbaijan, Georgia and Turkey," but it will also "constitute a new stage in the further marginalization of Armenia within the South Caucasus." The president of Azerbaijan, Ilham Aliyev, reportedly declared in 2005: "If we succeed with this project, the Armenians will end in complete isolation, which would create an additional problem for their already bleak future".

As further objectives, the railway is expected to provide stable goods turnover between Azerbaijan, Turkey, Georgia, and the countries located on the other side of the Caspian Sea. The formation of strong port infrastructure and transportation of oil and oil products to the world markets are also part of targets.

== Route ==
In total, 105 kilometres (65 mi) of new track have been built between Kars and Akhalkalaki, with 76 kilometres (47 mi) within Turkey and 29 kilometres (18 mi) in Georgia. While the Turkish section is not electrified, the 29 kilometres (18 mi) section within Georgia has been fully electrified as part of comprehensive modernisation works, connecting the border directly to the electrified network at the Akhalkalaki break-of-gauge station. This newly built international section is single track, though the platform and the tunnels are prepared for a second track, should the need arise.

The existing railway line from Akhalkalaki to Marabda and on to Tbilisi and Baku has also been modernised to handle the increased traffic.

Its total length is 826 kilometres (513 mi), and the line will be able to transport 1 million passengers and 6.5 million tons of freight in the first stage. Its capacity will eventually be 3 million passengers and over 15 million tons of freight.

== Gauge ==
Various railway track gauges 1,520 mm broad gauge 1,435 mm standard gauge

Georgia and Azerbaijan both use the Russian broad gauge of 1,520 mm (4 ft 11 27/32 in), and the existing section of railway line (Akhalkalaki–Tbilisi–Baku) will not be modified. The new tracks, i.e. the Georgian section from Akhalkalaki to the border station at Kartsakhi (Georgian: კარწახი; 41°14′22″N 43°15′46″E), and the new Turkish section from Kartsakhi to Kars, were built to the standard gauge, which is used by Turkey.

The line therefore includes a break of gauge near Akhalkalaki, which typically requires either variable gauge wheelsets, bogie exchange or cargo reloading. The passenger cars that Azerbaijan Railways ordered from the Swiss firm Stadler Rail AG in 2014 (see below), will be equipped with the DB AG/RAFIL Type V system of adjustable wheelsets, to accommodate the change of gauge from 1,520 mm (4 ft 11 27/32 in) to 1,435 mm (4 ft 8 1/2 in) standard gauge. In June 2018, Stadler signed a contract in Bussnang, Switzerland, with the Georgian company Marabda-Kartsakhi-Railway LCC, for the delivery of a gauge-changing facility, comprising 30 metres (98 ft) of special track, to be installed in Akhalkalaki.

In March 2019, it was reported that the Stadler stock had completed a gauge-changing test, and a video was posted.

== Rolling stock ==
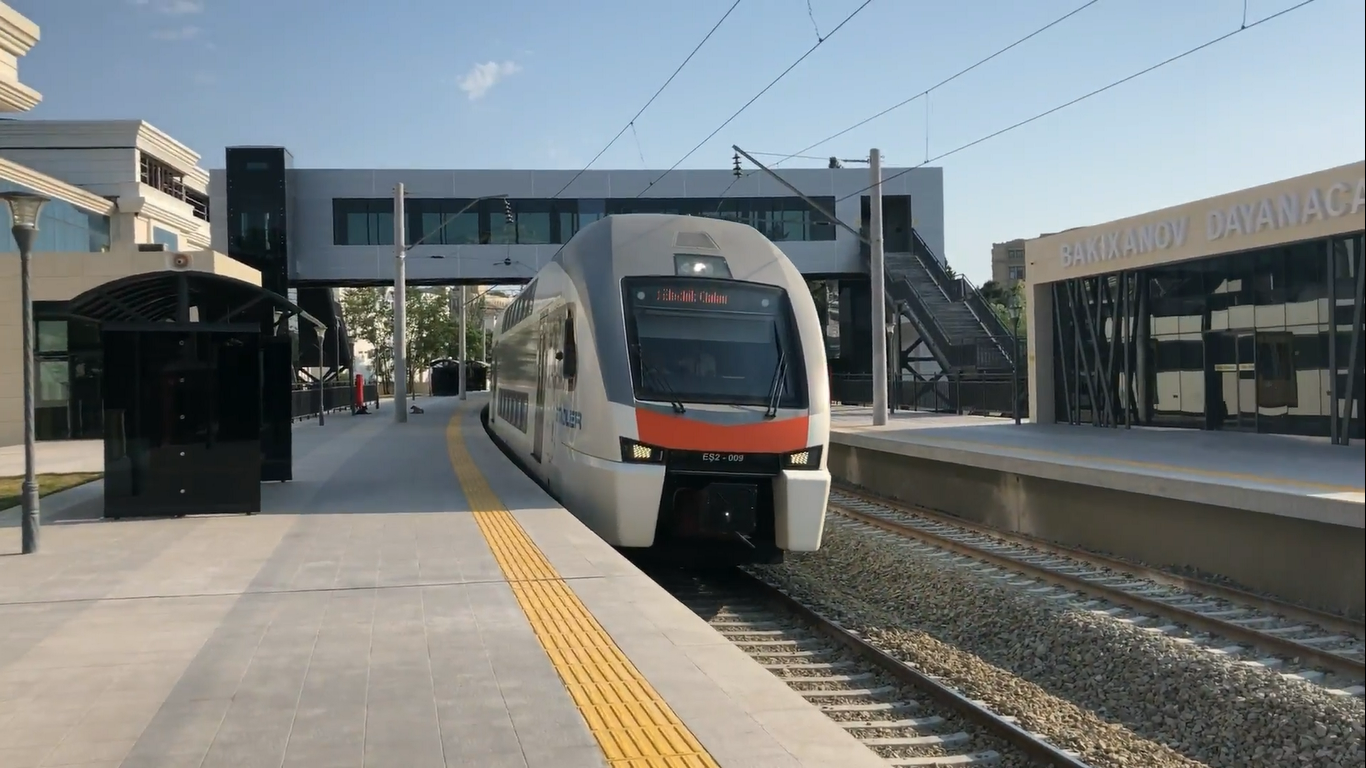
Stadler FLIRT

In June 2014, Azerbaijan Railways announced that it had signed a SFr 120 million (EUR 115 million) contract with Stadler Rail to supply three ten-car variable-gauge sleeper trains, with an option for seven more.

Each train will have a total of 257 beds, divided into first, second, and "first/second" (family compartments) classes. The contract includes an option for a further 70 sleeping cars.

Each train will be made up of:

1 first-class car
16 compartments, all with en-suite toilet and shower
6 second-class cars
34 beds sharing one toilet and one shower
1 "first/second"-class car
20 beds, including family compartments
1 second-class car
compartment for reduced-mobility passengers, four second-class compartments with 16 beds, and a crew compartment
1 dining-car
seating 28

Stadler delivered the first of three ten-carriage passenger trains to Azerbaijan Railways in March 2019. The trains are manufactured at Stadler's factory in Belarus, and the two remaining units were to be delivered in early 2020.

Following a six-year suspension of international passenger rail links due to COVID-19 pandemic restrictions starting in March 2020, Azerbaijan Railways reinstated the Baku–Tbilisi night train on 26 May 2026. The renewed service operates exclusively with these Stadler sleeper coaches, offering comfort, comfort+, and luxury classes, and officially replaces the Soviet-era passenger cars that had already been withdrawn in 2019.

== In operation ==
=== Freight ===
By November 2019, the line had carried 275,000 tons of freight, according to Turkey's transport and infrastructure minister. Three trains a week run between Turkey and Kazakhstan, and block container train services between China and Turkey are run once a week. The BTK line is also increasingly used for north-south links: a Memorandum of Understanding on Co-operation on the BTK Railway Route, signed by Azerbaijan, Russia, and Turkey in May 2019, notably aims to increase exchanges between Turkey and Russia to 6 million tons

The first freight train to travel from China (Xi'an) to Europe (Prague) via the BTK line and Istanbul's Marmaray Tunnel under the Bosphorus arrived in Prague on 6 November 2019. Traveling at an average speed of 40km/h, the China Railway Express will link Western China and Central Europe in just 18 days. In volume, the 42 cars of the train could transport the equivalent of 96.5 TEU (or 0.4% of the capacity of a Gülsün-class container ship, once the world's largest container ship).

=== Passengers ===
Passenger services were scheduled to start in August 2019, but did not start until 2026, though the line was 95% complete in 2025. In May 2026, the first passenger train in 6 years ran between Baku and Tbilisi.

== See also ==
- Azerbaijan Railways
- Georgian Railway
- Middle Corridor
- Turkish State Railways
- Zangezur corridor
