= Akhalkalaki =

Akhalkalaki ახალქალაქი
- Town
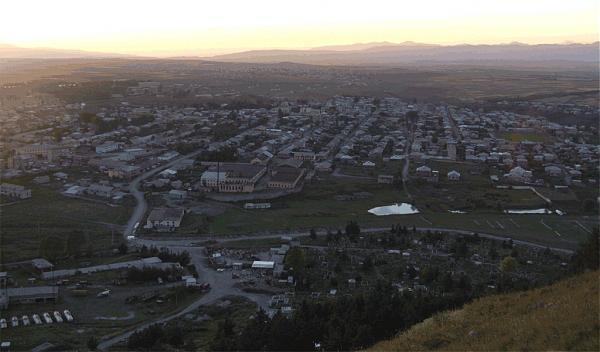

- Location within Georgia Location within Samtskhe-Javakheti
- Coordinates: 41°24′20″N 43°29′10″E
- Country: Georgia
- Mkhare: Samtskhe-Javakheti
- District: Akhalkalaki
- Elevation: 1,707 m (5,600 ft)

Population (2024)
  - Total: 7,483
- Time zone: UTC+4 (Georgian Time)
- Website: Official

Akhalkalaki (Georgian: ახალქალაქი, romanized: akhalkalaki [äχäɫkʰäɫäkʰi]; Armenian: Ախալքալաք, romanized: Axalk’alak’) is a town in Georgia's southern region of Samtskhe–Javakheti and the administrative centre of the Akhalkalaki Municipality. Akhalkalaki lies on the edge of the Javakheti Plateau. The city is located about 29 kilometres (18 mi) from the border with Armenia. The town's recorded history goes back to the 11th century. As of the 2014 Georgian census the town had a population of 8,295, with 93.8% Armenian majority.

== Etymology ==
The name Akhalkalaki, first recorded in the 11th-century Georgian chronicle, means "a new town", from Georgian [ɑxɑli], "new", and [kʰɑlɑkʰi], "city" or "town". The 19th-century ethnographic accounts also mention other names for the town - Akhalkatak and Nor-Katak, also in Armenian meaning Nor - "new", katak - "city".

== History ==
Akhalkalaki was founded by Bagrat IV of Georgia in 1064. In 1066, the city was destroyed during the Seljuq invasions of the Kingdom of Georgia. In the 11th century, Akhalkalaki became one of the political and economic centers of Javakheti. In the 16th century, the city came under the rule of the Ottoman Empire and became a sanjak center in Çıldır Eyaleti. Under the Ottoman rule, the town was known as "Ahılkelek". The city was passed from the Ottomans to the Russians after the Russo-Turkish War in 1828–1829. Around 1830, approximately 30,000 Armenian refugees from Turkey's Erzurum region settled here. On January 4, 1900, an earthquake destroyed much of the town and killed 1,000 people in the area. The citizens predominantly dwelled in dugouts until the 1920s. The city was the administrative center of the Akhalkalaki uezd of the Tiflis Governorate. In May 1918, the town and its district were occupied by the Ottoman army until their withdrawal by the Armistice of Mudros—the occupation resulted in the exodus of the local Armenian population which nearly perished due to starvation and disease.

== Population ==
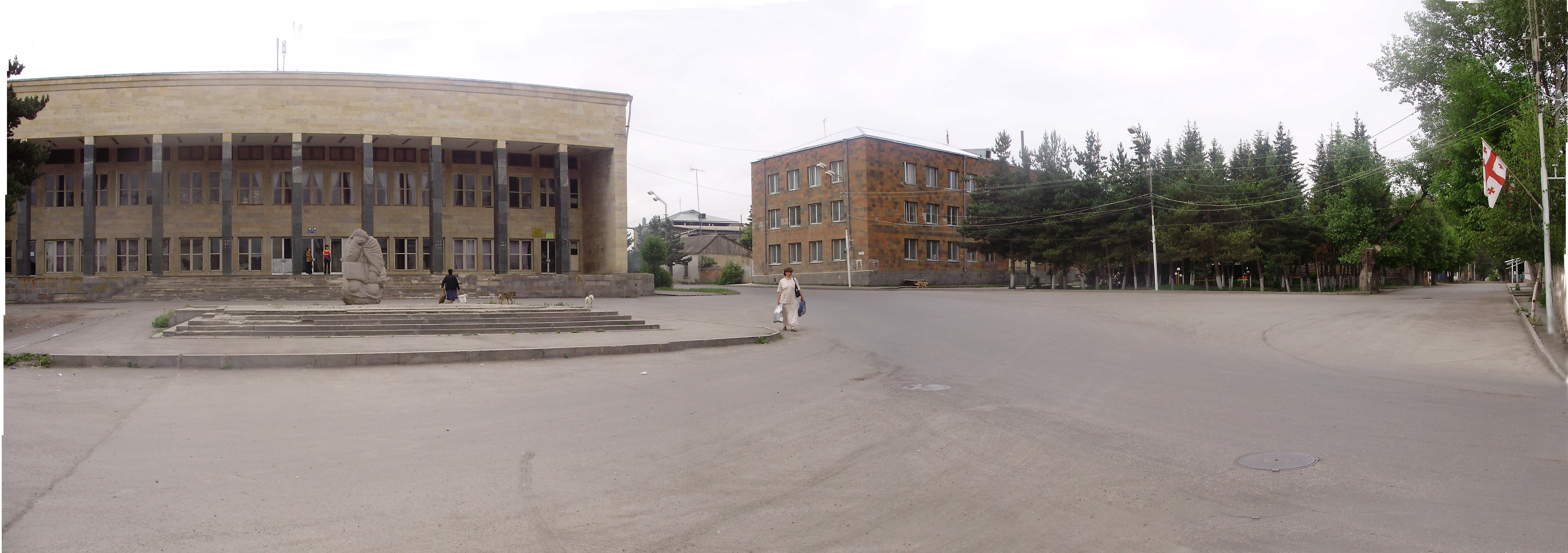
Downtown of Akhalkalaki

By the time of the region's annexation to the Russian Empire in 1829, the population was mainly Islamicized Georgians. After the Russian takeover, most of the Muslim Georgians left the area for the Ottoman Empire, and in their place Christian Armenian refugees from Erzurum and Bayazid settled here. Since then the city and the region of Javakheti has been largely populated by Armenians.

Population and ethnic composition of Akhalkalaki from the late 19th century
Year	Armenians		Georgians		Russians		Total
1886	4,083	94.9%	51	1.2%	57	1.3%	4,303
1897	4,136	76%	129	2.4%	479	8.8%	5,440
1916	6,151	87.2%	265	3.8%	429	6.1%	7,055
May 1918: Ottoman occupation and escape of Armenian population
1926	3,185	90.9%	197	5.7%	61	1.8%	3,475
1939	4,666	87.5%	337	6.3%	245	4.6%	5,331
1959	6,522	74.1%	433	4.9%	1,424	16.2%	8,804
1979	11,879	89.8%	506	3.8%	563	4.3%	13,224
1989							15,572
2014	7,782	93.8%	471	5.7%	18	0.2%	8,295

== Climate ==
The climate of Akhalkalaki is moderately humid with relative cold dry winters and long cool summers. (Köppen: Dfb)

Climate data for Akhalkalaki (1991–2020)
Month	Jan	Feb	Mar	Apr	May	Jun	Jul	Aug	Sep	Oct	Nov	Dec	Year
Record high °C (°F)	9.0 (48.2)	12.0 (53.6)	19.2 (66.6)	25.7 (78.3)	27.3 (81.1)	30.7 (87.3)	37.4 (99.3)	35.0 (95.0)	33.6 (92.5)	27.9 (82.2)	20.0 (68.0)	16.1 (61.0)	37.4 (99.3)
Mean daily maximum °C (°F)	−0.8 (30.6)	0.2 (32.4)	5.3 (41.5)	11.9 (53.4)	17.0 (62.6)	20.8 (69.4)	24.4 (75.9)	25.2 (77.4)	21.4 (70.5)	15.7 (60.3)	8.5 (47.3)	1.8 (35.2)	12.6 (54.7)
Daily mean °C (°F)	−6.1 (21.0)	−5.4 (22.3)	−0.1 (31.8)	5.8 (42.4)	10.4 (50.7)	13.7 (56.7)	16.9 (62.4)	17.3 (63.1)	13.3 (55.9)	8.6 (47.5)	2.4 (36.3)	−3.5 (25.7)	6.1 (43.0)
Mean daily minimum °C (°F)	−11.4 (11.5)	−11.0 (12.2)	−5.5 (22.1)	−0.3 (31.5)	3.8 (38.8)	6.5 (43.7)	9.3 (48.7)	9.3 (48.7)	5.1 (41.2)	1.4 (34.5)	−3.8 (25.2)	−8.8 (16.2)	−0.4 (31.2)
Record low °C (°F)	−29.6 (−21.3)	−29.2 (−20.6)	−22.1 (−7.8)	−16.6 (2.1)	−11.0 (12.2)	−5.6 (21.9)	−2.6 (27.3)	−0.9 (30.4)	−5.1 (22.8)	−13.7 (7.3)	−20.0 (−4.0)	−25.6 (−14.1)	−29.6 (−21.3)
Average precipitation mm (inches)	31.2 (1.23)	27.1 (1.07)	38.0 (1.50)	50.8 (2.00)	85.3 (3.36)	80.0 (3.15)	63.5 (2.50)	47.1 (1.85)	38.0 (1.50)	40.6 (1.60)	30.7 (1.21)	30.7 (1.21)	563.0 (22.17)
Average precipitation days (≥ 1.0 mm)	6.7	6.5	7.4	9.2	13.4	11.1	9.0	8.3	6.3	7.2	5.9	6.3	97.3
Source: NOAA

== Transport ==
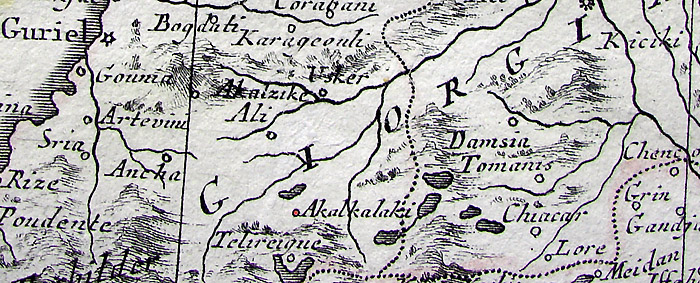
The fragment from the map By Antonio Zatta, published in Venice in 1784. The map shows Akhalkalaki, Georgia

The crossroads village meets from south the streets from the border to Armenia and Turkey, from north to Borjomi–Gori and east–west from Batumi to Tiflis south of the Lesser Caucasus.

A 160 kilometres (99 mi) long railway line was constructed between 1982 and 1986 in three parts. The junction from the line Tbilisi–Yerevan is in Marabda.

In April 2005, an agreement was signed to build a new railway connecting Turkey with Georgia and Azerbaijan, passing nearby Akhalkalaki. This would bypass an existing line through Gyumri in Armenia which has been closed by Turkey, blockading Armenia, for political reasons since the 1990s. The railway became operational on October 30, 2017. It is here where the break-of-gauge is.

In compound with the military base was constructed an airport. With military dismantling it was closed.

== Bases ==
The city was home to the Soviet-era 147th Motor Rifle Division (part of the 9th Army of the Transcaucasian Military District) up until the early 1990s. After the fall of the Soviet Union, the Division became the Russian 62nd Military Base. It was officially transferred, according to the Sochi agreement, to Georgia on June 27, 2007.

On September 19, 2020, a new basic combat training center was opened on the site of the former base in Akhalkalaki. The center is designed to accommodate and train up to 800 military personnel and conscripts.

== Notable people ==
- Derenik Demirchian (1877–1956), Armenian writer
- Jivani (1846–1909), Armenian bard
- Harutyun Khachatryan (b. 1955), Armenian film director
- Benur Pashayan (1959–2019), Soviet Armenian Greco-Roman wrestler
- Ruben Ter-Minasian (1882–1951), Defense Minister of the First Republic of Armenia
- Hamo Ohanjanyan (1873–1947), the third Prime Minister of the First Republic of Armenia
- Aik Mnatsakanian (b. 1995), Armenian wrestler representing Bulgaria
- Hakob Hakobyan (b. 1997), professional football player
- Arman Tsarukyan (b. 1996), Armenian mixed martial artist
- Zhora Akopyan (b. 1997), Armenian kickboxer

== Gallery ==
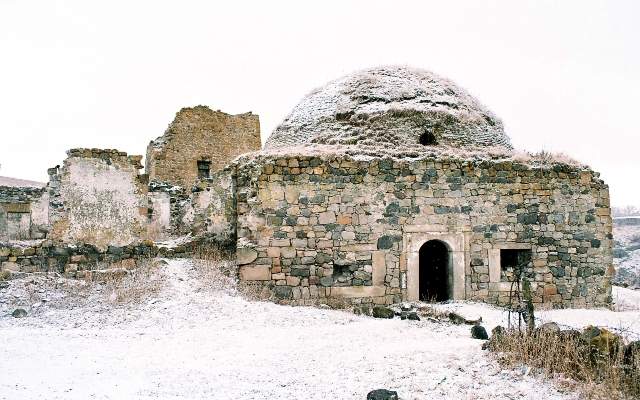
Akhalkalaki Castle Complex

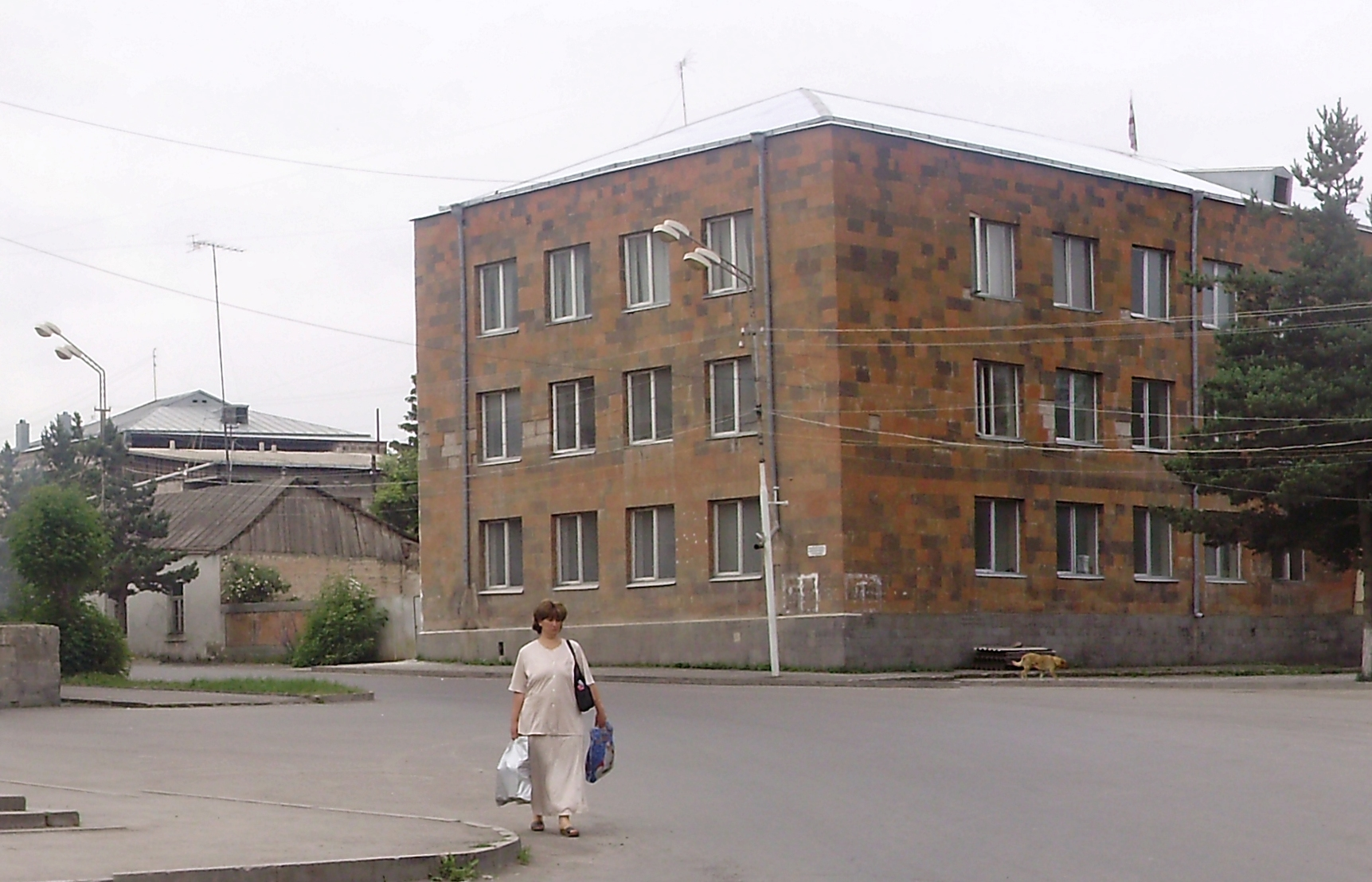
Main square of Akhalkalaki

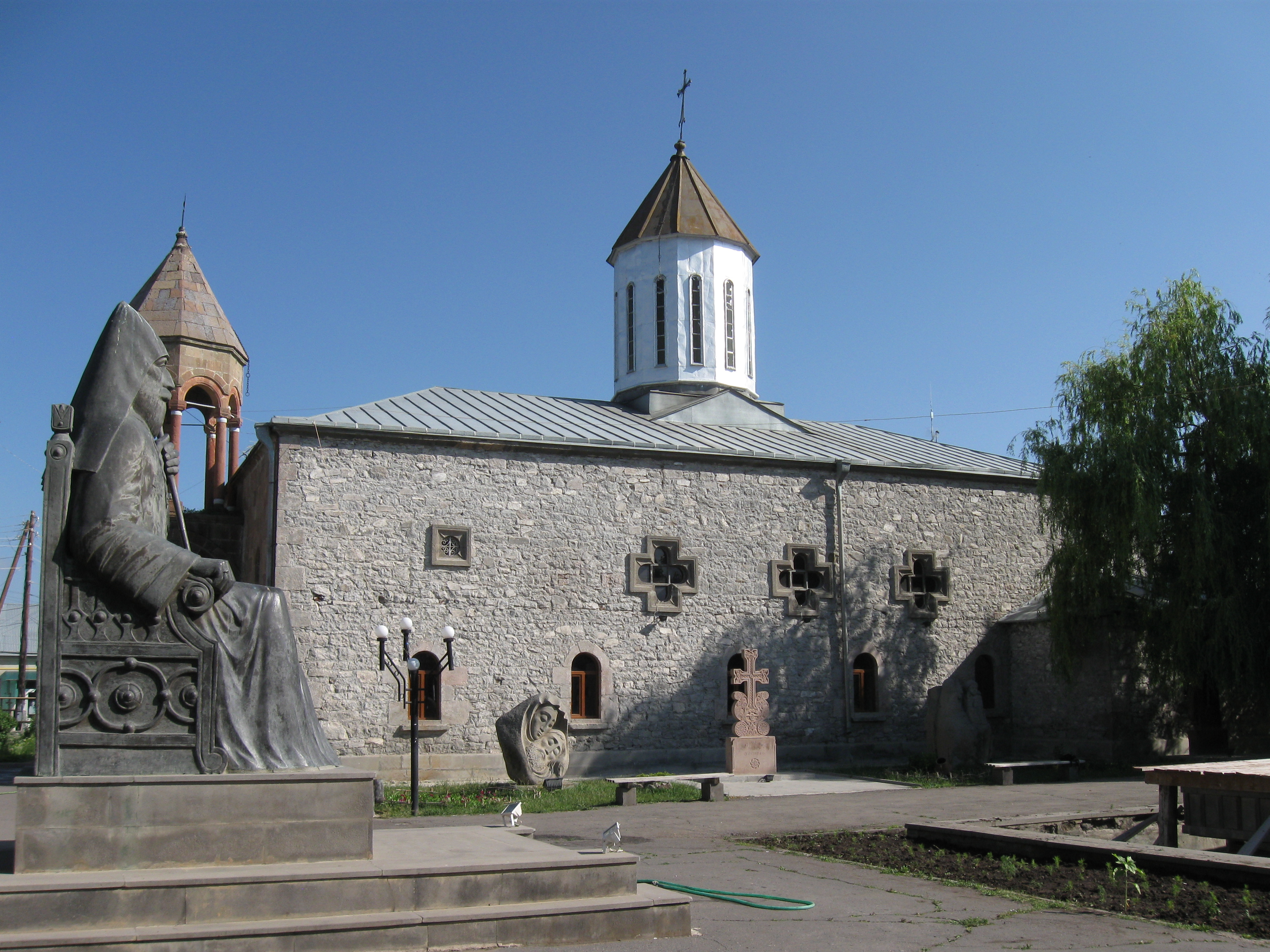
Armenian Apostolic Church in Akhalkalaki

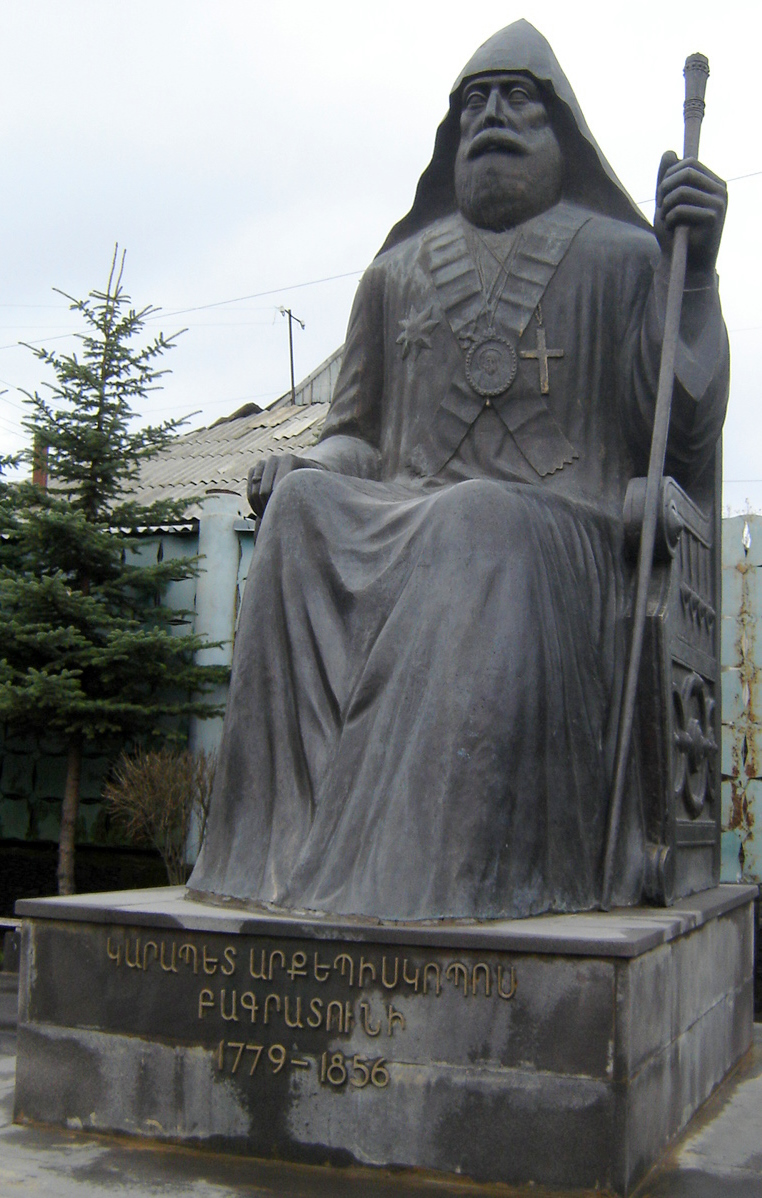
Statue of Karapet Bagratuni

== See also ==
- Samtskhe–Javakheti
