= Marabda =

Coordinates: 41°32′07″N 44°45′33″E

Marabda მარაბდა
- Community
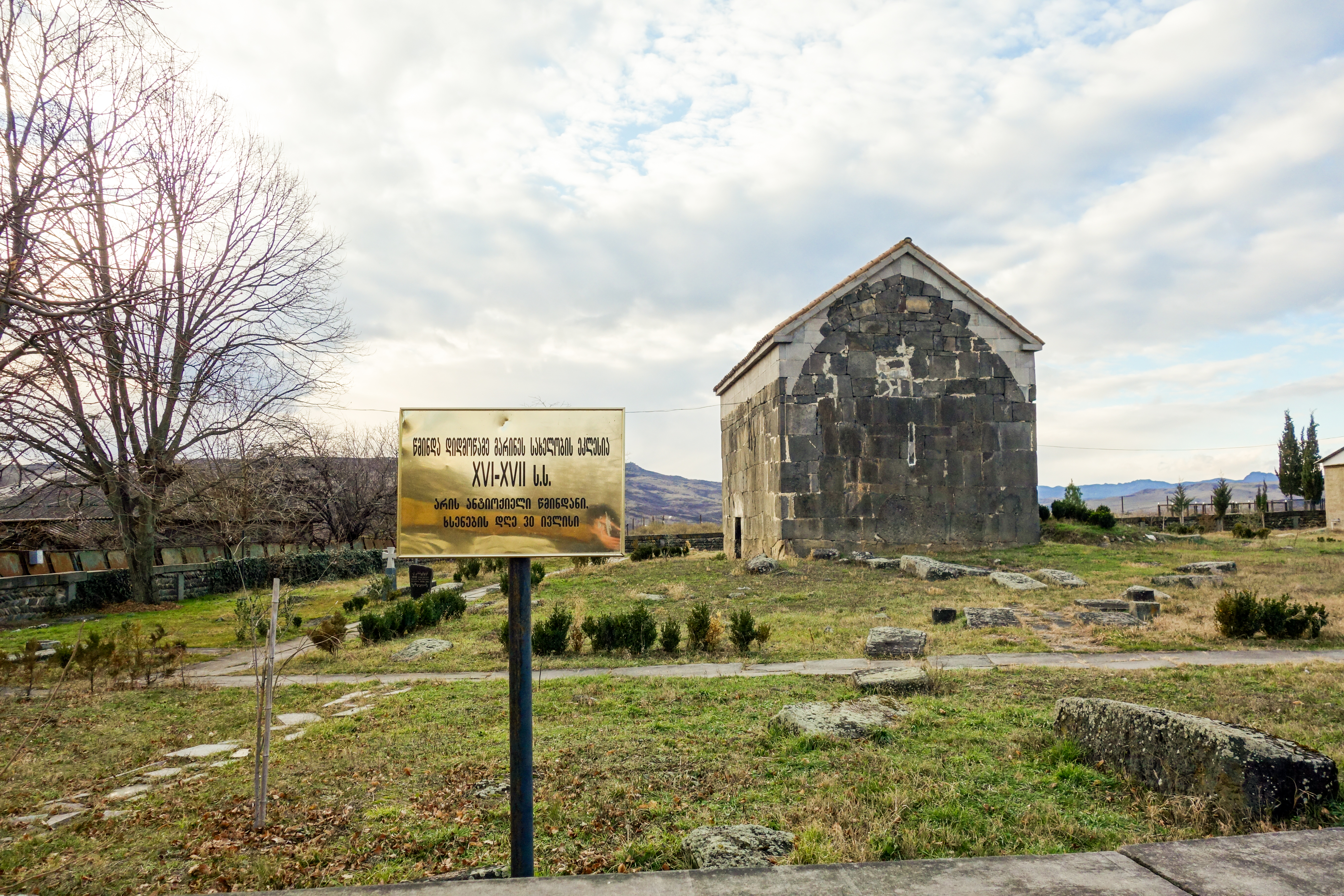
- St. Marine Church in Dzveli Marabda
- Interactive map of Marabda
- Country: Georgia
- Region: Kvemo Kartli
- Municipality: Tetritskaro

Population (2014)
  - Total: 488
- Time zone: UTC+4 (Georgian Time)
  - Summer (DST): UTC+5

Marabda (Georgian: მარაბდა) is a community in Georgia, located some 23 km south of the capital Tbilisi, and a few kilometers north of Marneuli. It consists of three villages Akhali Marabda, Kotishi and Dzveli Marabda. According to the 2014 Georgian Census population of the community is 488.

== Transport ==
Marabda is served by a Georgian Railway station on the Tbilisi–Gyumri line, 23 km south of Tbilisi Junction. In the 1980s, Marabda itself became a railway junction, as a branch line to Akhalkalaki (160 km to the west) was completed in 1986.

The treaty to build the Kars-Tbilisi-Baku railway — which will include the (rehabilitated) Akhalkalaki-Marabda line — was signed at Marabda.

== See also ==
- Battle of Marabda
- Railway stations in Georgia
- Kvemo Kartli
