= Crossroads village =

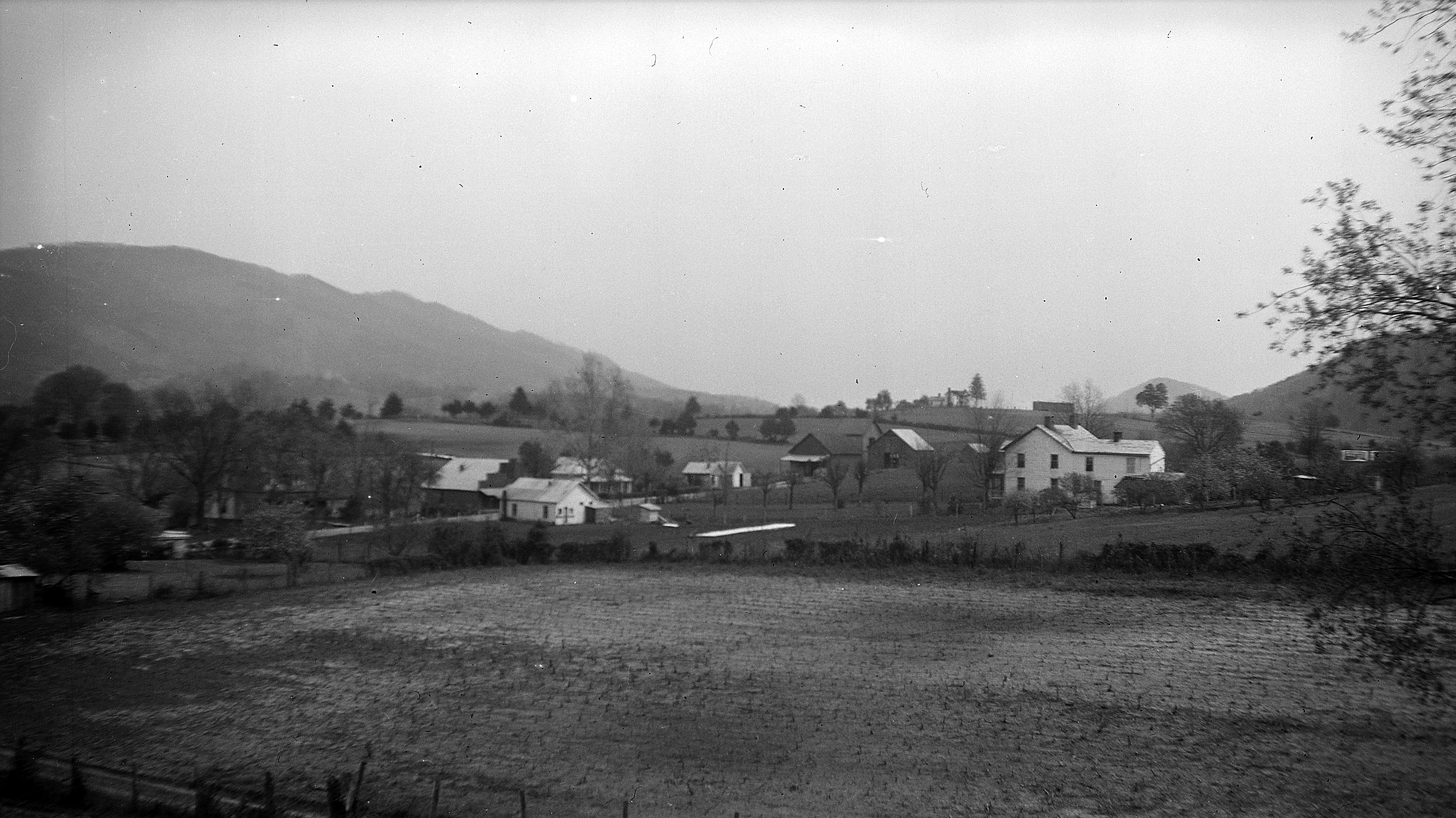
Bean Station, Tennessee, settled in 1776, was located at the crossroads of the Wilderness Road and the Great Indian Warpath.

In Colonial American history, a crossroads village is a settlement that was situated where two or more roads would intersect. The owners of farmland along a frequently traveled trail, path, or road, often paralleling a water route, would plan a village where two or three roads crossed (known as a crossroads).

A village that developed at the crossing of the trails or roads was usually named after one of the area's first settlers. A general store, tavern, and a few other buildings would be erected. Near these villages, the social, commercial, educational, and religious aspects of the emerging society originated and were supported.

To a large extent, crossroads villages provided identity and vitality to the surrounding countryside and a sense of community in the early years of settlement. Villages began to appear on the landscape when farmers had produced enough good harvests to erect satisfactory homes, barns, fences, and wanted goods and services beyond their capacity and that of their neighbors to produce.

== See also ==
- Railway town
- Company town
