= Doğukapı railway station =

Doğukapı

General information
- Coordinates: 40.7299°N 43.7374°E
- System: TCDD
- Owner: TCDD
- Platforms: 2
- Tracks: 7

Construction
- Structure type: At-grade

Other information
- Status: Closed

History
- Opened: 1899
- Closed: 1993
- Rebuilt: 1962
Location

Doğukapı station is a freight station near the Turkey/Armenia border, on the former Kars–Gyumri railway line. The station name, "Doğukapı" means "the Eastern Gate" in Turkish, referring to the station's being the Turkey's entry point from the USSR.

The station building is abandoned and the tracks are rarely used. Since the closing of the border in 1993, no trains have operated east of the station.
