= Kars–Gyumri–Tbilisi railway =

Railway line in Turkey, Armenia and Georgia

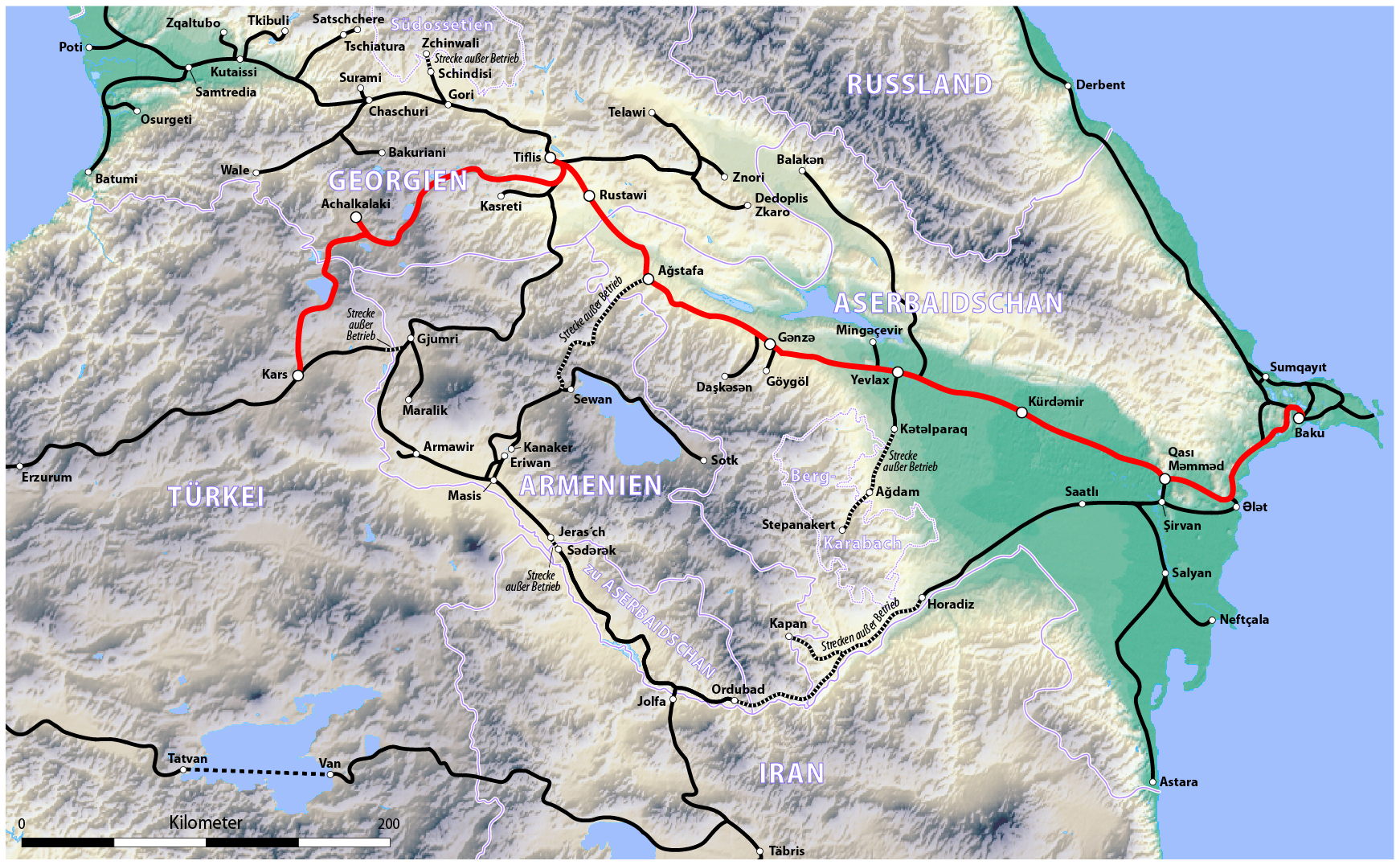
The existing Kars–Gyumri (Gjumri)–Tbilisi (Tiflis) railway line (in black), south of the Kars–Akhalkalaki–Tbilisi railway (in red)

The Kars–Gyumri–Tbilisi railway line is a railway line that runs from the city of Kars in Turkey to the Armenian city of Gyumri, and from there on to Tbilisi, Georgia.

Originally completed in 1899, the railway was highly important during the Soviet era, both as the only direct rail link between Turkey and the USSR (Kars-Gyumri), and as one of the two main railway connections between Armenia and other Soviet Republics (Gyumri-Tbilisi). While the Gyumri-Tbilisi section remains Armenia's lifeline to the outside world, the Kars-Gyumri section has not been operational since 1993, when Turkey closed the border with Armenia, following the first Nagorno-Karabakh War between Armenia and Turkic-speaking Azerbaijan, in support of the Azeris.

Because the Kars–Gyumri section has been inoperative due to the closed Turkish-Armenian border, an agreement was signed in April 2005 to build a direct connection across the Turkish-Georgian border from Kars to Akhalkalaki in Georgia, and to rehabilitate the existing railways from Akhalkalaki to Tbilisi and Baku, thus creating the Kars–Tbilisi–Baku mainline. The European Union (EU) and the United States declined to assist in financing or promoting the new mainline, because they saw it as designed to bypass Armenia, and supported the reopening of the Kars-Gyumri-Tbilisi railway line instead. However, the EU did "welcome" the opening of the line.

== History ==
=== Construction ===
The railway was built in the late 19th century, when Georgia and Armenia, as well as the recently conquered Kars Oblast, all were parts of the Russian Empire. By the late 1880s, the railway system of Russian Transcaucasia consisted of the mainline from Poti and Batumi on the Black Sea to Tiflis (now Tbilisi) to Baku on the Caspian Sea, run by the Transcaucasian Railway.

An on-site study of the future railway route from Tiflis to Alexandropol (now Gyumri) to Kars was initiated in the spring of 1894 by the Imperial Ministry of Communications and the management of the Transcaucasian Railway. The construction work, led by engineer E. Wurzel (Russian: Е. Вурцель), was completed in December 1899.

In 1899, work also started on a branch line from Alexandropol south to Yerevan. That was completed in 1902, and later extended to Julfa on the Iranian border.

=== Operation ===
During World War I, the railway was used to supply Russian troops fighting the Ottoman Empire in Anatolia. After the war, Turkey took possession of Kars, and re-gauged the part of the railway now in Turkey from the 1,520 mm (4 ft 11 27/32 in) to 1,435 mm (4 ft 8 1/2 in) standard gauge.

During the USSR era, the Gyumri-Kars line became the only direct railway connection between the USSR and Turkey. For most of the time, the Soviet Armenian railway staff at the final Soviet station, Akhuryan (the border station is apparently here: 40°44′8″N 43°47′13″E, although it may be not the main Akhuryuan station), had a fairly good working relationship with their Turkish colleagues at Doğukapı (station apparently here: 40°43′46″N 43°44′1″E) on the Turkish side of the border. In the mid-1980s, the annual freight volume across the border was around 65,000 tons, peaking at 180,000 tons in 1989. Apparently, that was still much less than the railway's [potential] capacity, which was as high as 6,000,000 tons per year.

Until a crane for changing railcar bogies was purchased at Akhuryan, which came quite late in the border stations' history, shortly before the border was closed, cargo had to be transferred from Soviet rail cars to Turkish ones, and vice versa. The Turkish Doğukapı, on the other hand, had a crane for moving intermodal containers between broad-gauge and standard-gauge cars.

In 1986, the construction of a 160-kilometer branch line from Marabda (on the Tbilisi-Gyumri line, 23 km south of Tbilisi Junction) west to Akhalkalaki was completed. That branch fell into disuse later, but was rehabilitated as part of the Kars–Tbilisi–Baku railway.

=== Closing of the Kars-Gyumri section ===
The last freight train crossed the Turkish-Armenian border on 6 July 1993, a few days before the border was closed by Turkey. The two governments agreed to exchange empty railcars (there were some empty Turkish cars left at the Armenian Akhuryan Station, and some Armenian ones at the Turkish Doğukapı), which was done on 11 July. Since then, no train has crossed the border.

The Gyumri-Tbilisi section is part of the Yerevan-Tbilisi mainline, and is Armenia's only functioning rail connection to the outside world. During the Soviet era, the Kars-Gyumri line was used by direct trains from Yerevan to Moscow and elsewhere in the USSR, but now trains from Armenia can only reach Georgia, because Georgia's rail connection with Russia has been severed due to the Abkhazian war, and Georgia's rail link to Azerbaijan is of little use to Armenians.
