= Medical University (Tbilisi Metro) =

Tbilisi Metro Station

Medical University სამედიცინო უნივერსიტეტი
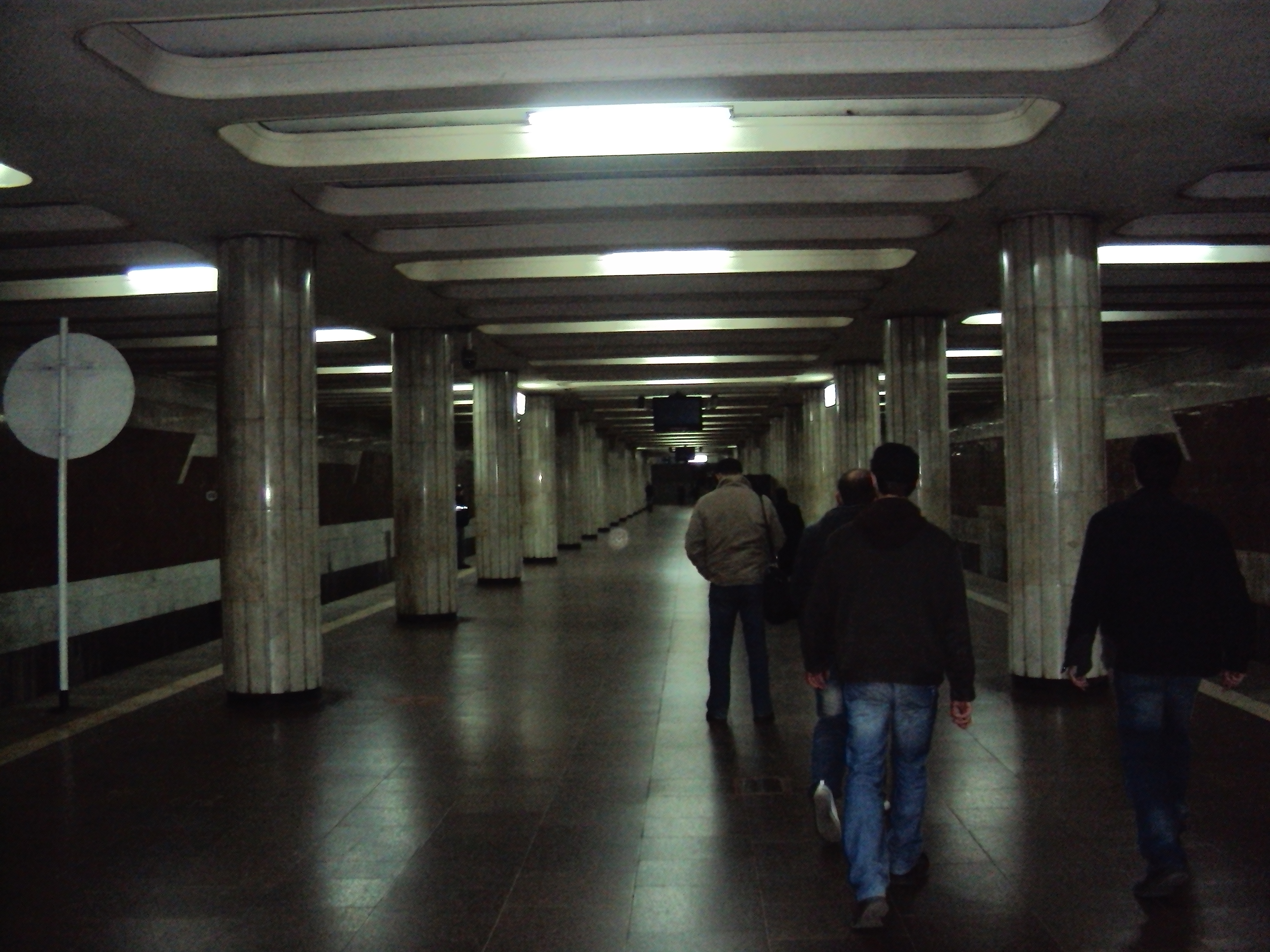
- Station Medical University, Tbilisi, Georgia

General information
- Coordinates: 41°43′38″N 44°45′45″E
- System: Tbilisi Metro station
- Line: Saburtalo Line
- Platforms: Island platform
- Tracks: 2

Construction
- Structure type: Shallow column station

History
- Opened: 1979
- Electrified: 750v DC third rail
- Former names: Komkavshiri (Named after the Soviet Komsomol)

Services
Preceding station	Tbilisi Metro	Following station
Delisi towards State University	Saburtalo Line	Technical University towards Station Square
Location

The Medical University metro station (Georgian: სამედიცინო უნივერსიტეტი, romanized: sameditsino universit'et'i) is situated intermediate on the Saburtalo Line in Tbilisi, Georgia. It opened in 1979 as Komkavshiri (translated as Komsomol) until being renamed in 1992, shortly after the dissolution of the USSR. The station is named after Tbilisi State Medical University.
