= Technical University (Tbilisi Metro) =

Tbilisi Metro Station

Technical University ტექნიკური უნივერსიტეტი
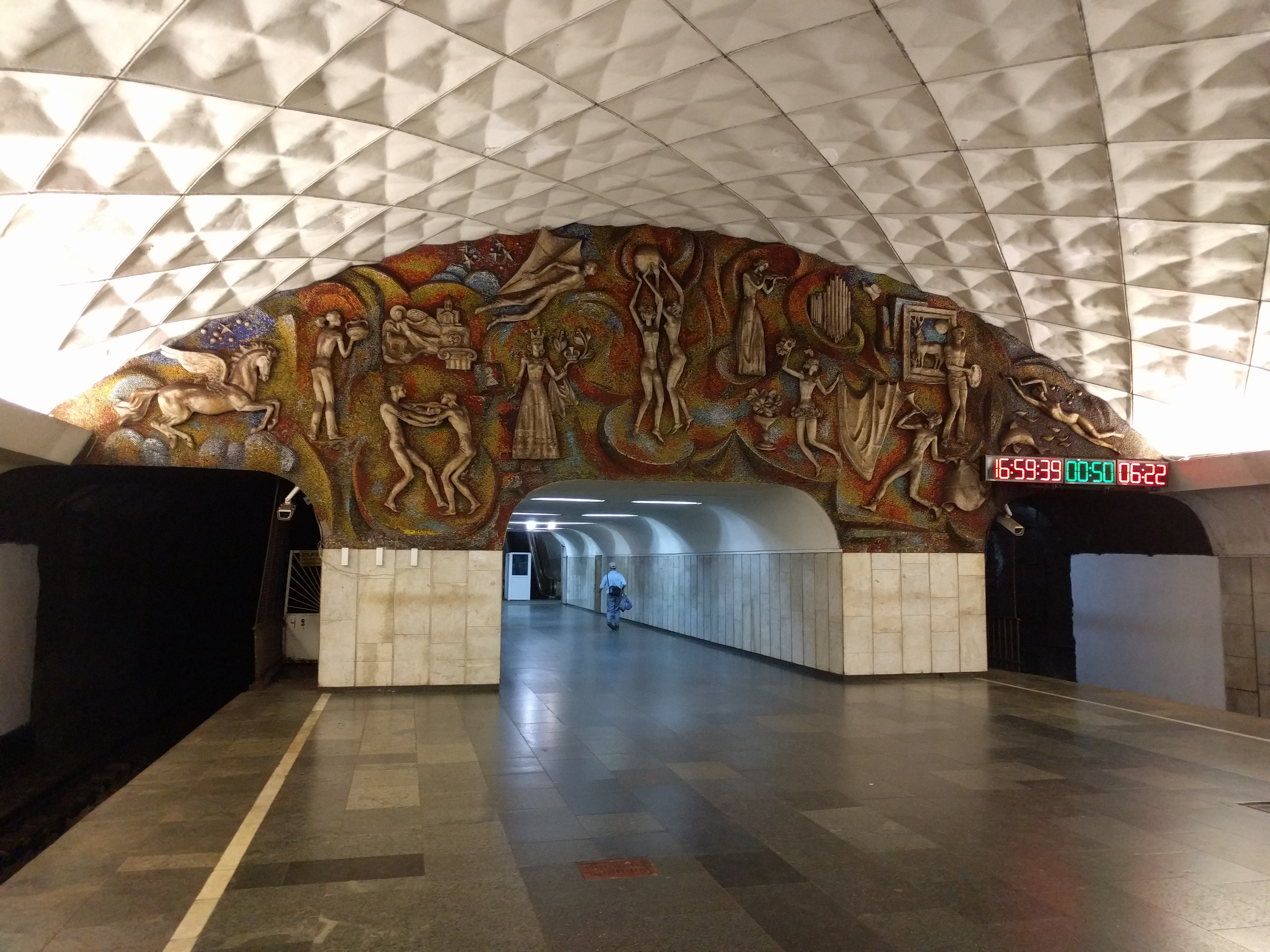
- Mosaic panel on the western end of the station

General information
- Coordinates: 41.718335°N 44.778138°E
- System: Tbilisi Metro station
- Platforms: Island platform
- Tracks: 2

Construction
- Structure type: Underground
- Platform levels: 1

History
- Opened: 15 April 1979

Services
Preceding station	Tbilisi Metro	Following station
Medical University towards State University	Saburtalo Line	Tsereteli towards Station Square
Location

The Technical University metro station (Georgian: ტექნიკური უნივერსიტეტი, romanized: t'eknik'uri universit'et'i) is situated intermediate on Saburtalo Line in Tbilisi, Georgia. The station has two entrances, the western from the intersections of Peking (Pekini) avenue and Bakhtrioni street and the eastern from Merab Kostava street, in front of the Tbilisi Sports Palace. The station is named after nearby Georgian Technical University. Other important places and buildings near the metro station include the 26 May Square, and the Holiday Inn (former Hotel Adjara).

Before 2011, the official name of the station was Politeknikuri Instituti (Georgian: პოლიტექნიკური ინსტიტუტი), i.e. Polytechnical Institute, the former official name of the Georgian Technical University.

The architecture of the single vault station is characterized by geometric patterns (rhombi) on the ceiling, with two mosaic panels decorated at both ends of the station depicting different scenes and elements of Georgian youth. Mosaic panels depict the spheres of Art & Sport on the western panel, and the themes of Labour & Education on the eastern. The designers and architects of colourful mosaic panels are Radish Tordia, Iden Tabidze, and Apolon Kharebava. Another element on the panel shown as a 'Queen of Chess' is meant to depict famous Georgian chess player Nona Gaprindashvili.

== Gallery ==
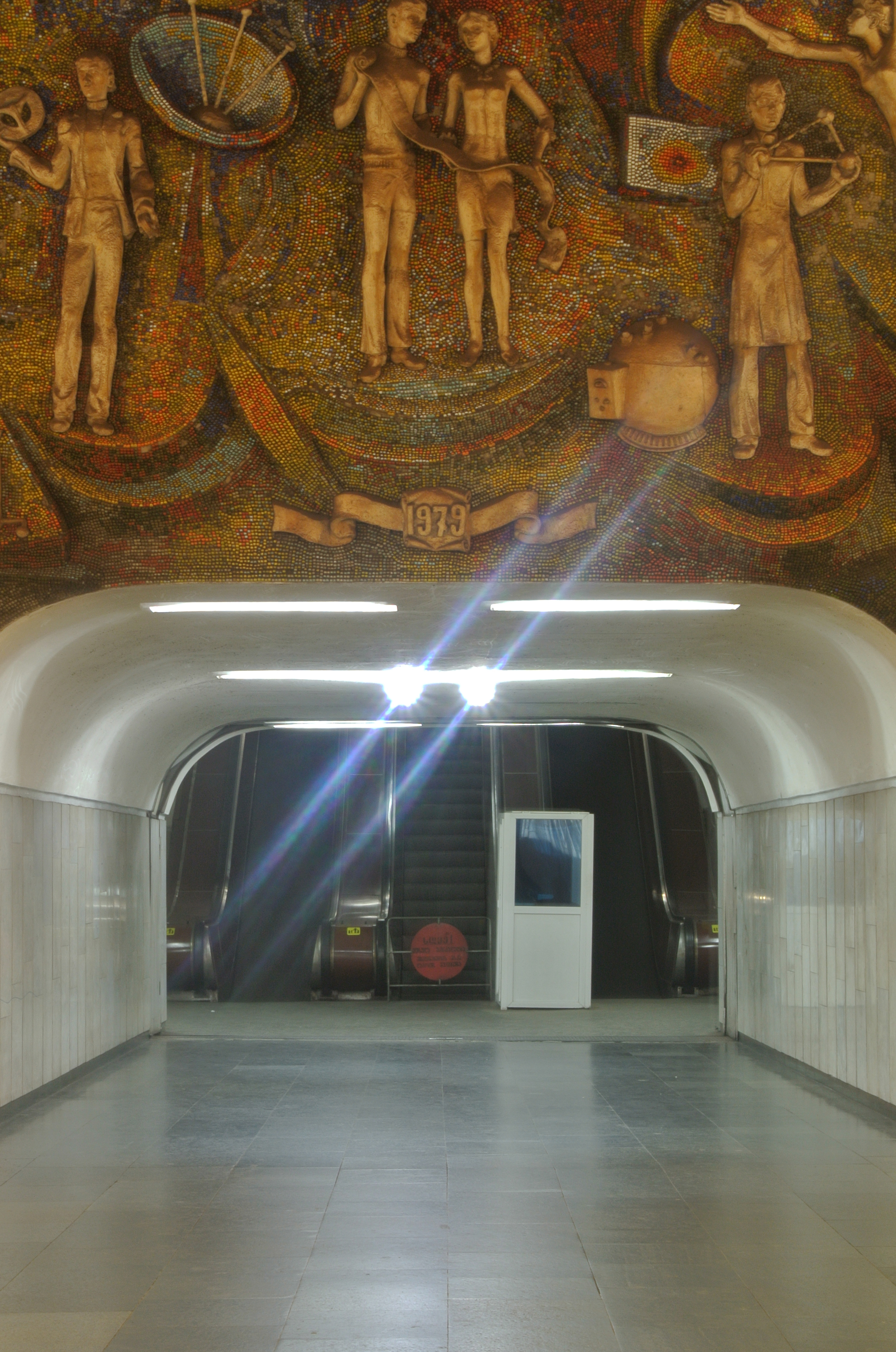
Mosaic panel on the eastern exit
