= Tsereteli (Tbilisi Metro) =

Tbilisi Metro station

Tsereteli წერეთელი
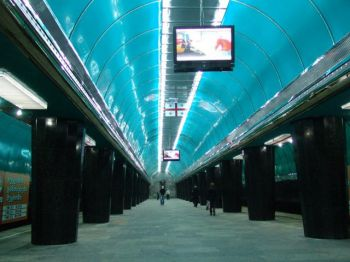
- Station Hall

General information
- Coordinates: 41.7277°N 44.787928°E
- System: Tbilisi Metro station
- Platforms: Island platform
- Tracks: 2

Construction
- Structure type: Underground
- Platform levels: 1

History
- Opened: 1979
- Rebuilt: 2007
- Former names: Tsereteli Avenue (წერეთლის გამზირი, Tseretlis Gamziri)

Services
Preceding station	Tbilisi Metro	Following station
Technical University towards State University	Saburtalo Line	Station Square Terminus
Location

Tsereteli (Georgian: წერეთელი) is a station located on the Saburtalo Line of Tbilisi Metro, between the stations Technical University and terminus Station Square-2. It opened in 1979 as part of the original 5 stations of the Saburtalo Line. It is named after the great Georgian writer Akaki Tsereteli, on whose named avenue the station is located. Alongside the terminus and transfer station of Station Square, it is one of the stations on the line not located within Saburtalo and is located in the Didube district.

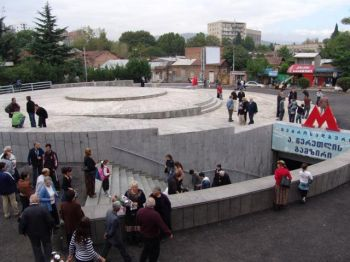
Entrance to the metro station.

The official name of the station was A. Tseretlis Gamziri (Georgian: ა. წერეთლის გამზირი), until being simplified to Tsereteli in 2011.

A relief wall bust of Akaki Tsereteli is located at the end of the station hall. The station interior was overhauled in 2006.

The landmarks and attractions near the station, from which they're the most accessible, include Didube Pantheon, Boris Paichadze Dinamo Arena, and Mushthaid Garden.

The station is described as one of the more vibrant stations of the Tbilisi Metro.
