= Viktor Gotsiridze =

Viktor Gotsiridze (Georgian: ვიქტორ გოცირიძე; 2 April 1910 – 22 March 1995) was a Georgian civil engineer, head of the "Tbilmetromsheni", which built the Tbilisi metro. He was the brother of the engineer Ilarion Gotsiridze.

Viktor Gotsiridze is considered to be one of the founders of the Tbilisi Metro. His name is associated with the construction of a 27-kilometer long subway line and 23 stations. He made a great contribution to many road and railway tunnels, both in Georgia and in other Caucasian republics.

Additionally his works includes the following: large agricultural facilities, railway stations (Sokhumi, Gagra, Sochi, Tuapse, Borjomi), the Akhmeta-Omalo road, Tskhratskaro cosmic ray station, and the improvement works of Akhali Atoni cave.

In 1977, he was awarded the USSR State Prize, among others.

He also supervised the construction of the Tbilisi railway station, the Institute of Physics, Republic Square, and the Metekhi Tunnel; and he participated in reconstruction works in Tbilisi and Yerevan.

Viktor Gotsiridze received many state awards, medals and honors including Honored Engineer of Georgia (1961), Honorary Railwayman (1944), Hero of Socialist Labor (1980), and Honorary Citizen of Tbilisi (1988).

Until 2011, Delisi station was known as Viktor Gotsiridze station, but shortly Elektrodepo station changed its name and was named after him.

== Literature ==
- Gomarteli D., Encyclopedia "Georgia" ("Sakartvelo"), vol. 2, Pp. 129-130, Tbilisi 2012

== Resources ==
- Viktor Gotsiridze – Biographical Dictionary of Georgia (in Georgian)
- Viktor Gorsiridze on website Hero of the Country (in Russian)
