= Delisi (Tbilisi Metro) =

Tbilisi Metro Station

Delisi დელისი
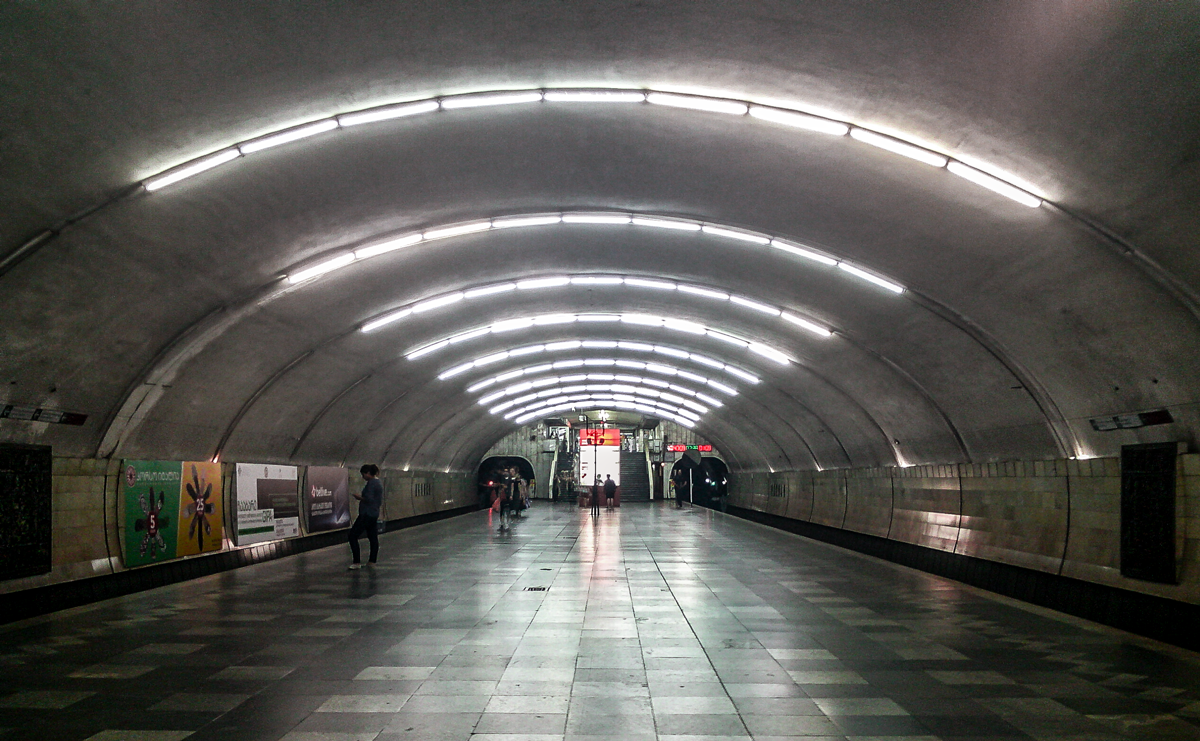
- Station hall

General information
- Coordinates: 41.7254°N 44.74624°E
- System: Tbilisi Metro station
- Line: Saburtalo Line
- Platforms: Island platform
- Tracks: 2+1 interlocking
- Connections: Bus: 301, 332, 334, 358, 363, 383, 387, 388, 389, 397, 405, 447

Construction
- Structure type: Single vault station
- Platform levels: 2: (pedestrian underpass, also branches off to stairs leading to level 1, which is the station platform
- Accessible: To be adapted after 2023

History
- Opened: 1979
- Electrified: third rail system
- Former names: Viktor Gotsiridze

Services
Preceding station	Tbilisi Metro	Following station
Vazha-Pshavela towards State University	Saburtalo Line	Medical University towards Station Square
Location

Delisi (Georgian: დელისი) is a metro station on the Saburtalo Line in Tbilisi, Georgia. The station is named after the historic settlement of Delisi, which today is used to refer to this area of Saburtalo surrounding the metro station. From 1995 to 2006 the station was known as Gotsiridze in honor of Viktor Gotsiridze, one of the founders of the Tbilisi Metro.

The station has two entrances and is located at the intersection of Vazha-Pshavela Avenue and Mikheil Tamarashvili Street. The station and its surrounding area act as a transport hub, serving the upland settlements and areas of the Vake and Saburtalo districts with several bus routes.

Delisi, alongside Sarajishvili metro station is one of the two stations in the network whose previous name transferred to another station, in this case to Gotsiridze station on the Akhmeteli-Varketili Line.

== Modernization ==
As of 2022, EBRD and the Tbilisi Mayor's Office announced that the infrastructure of the station would be adapted for people with disabilities. The tender for this project is to be announced in May 2023.

== Gallery ==
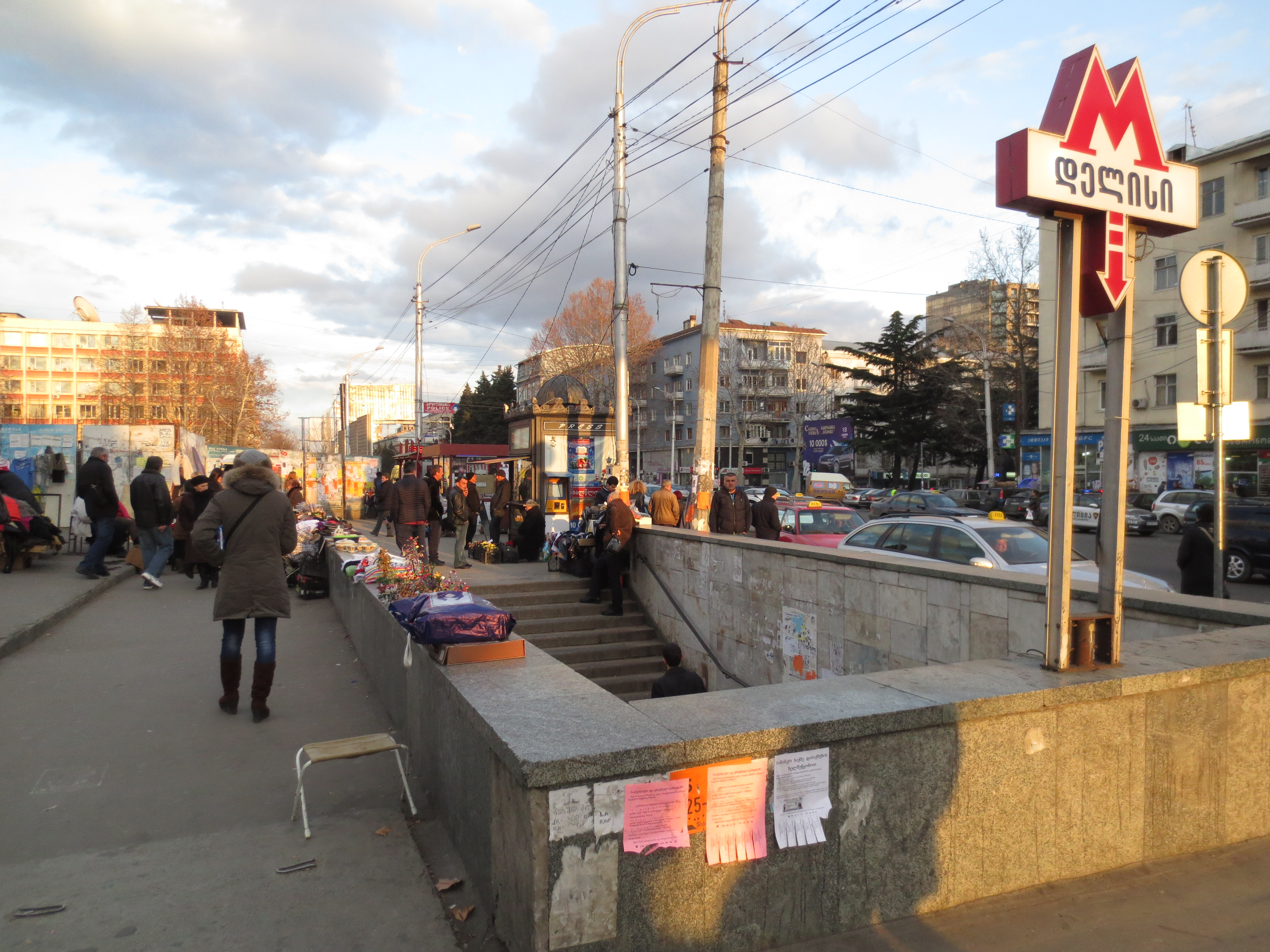
Western entrance to the station
