= Georgian Railways Class VMK EMU =

Georgian Railways Classes VMK and GRT
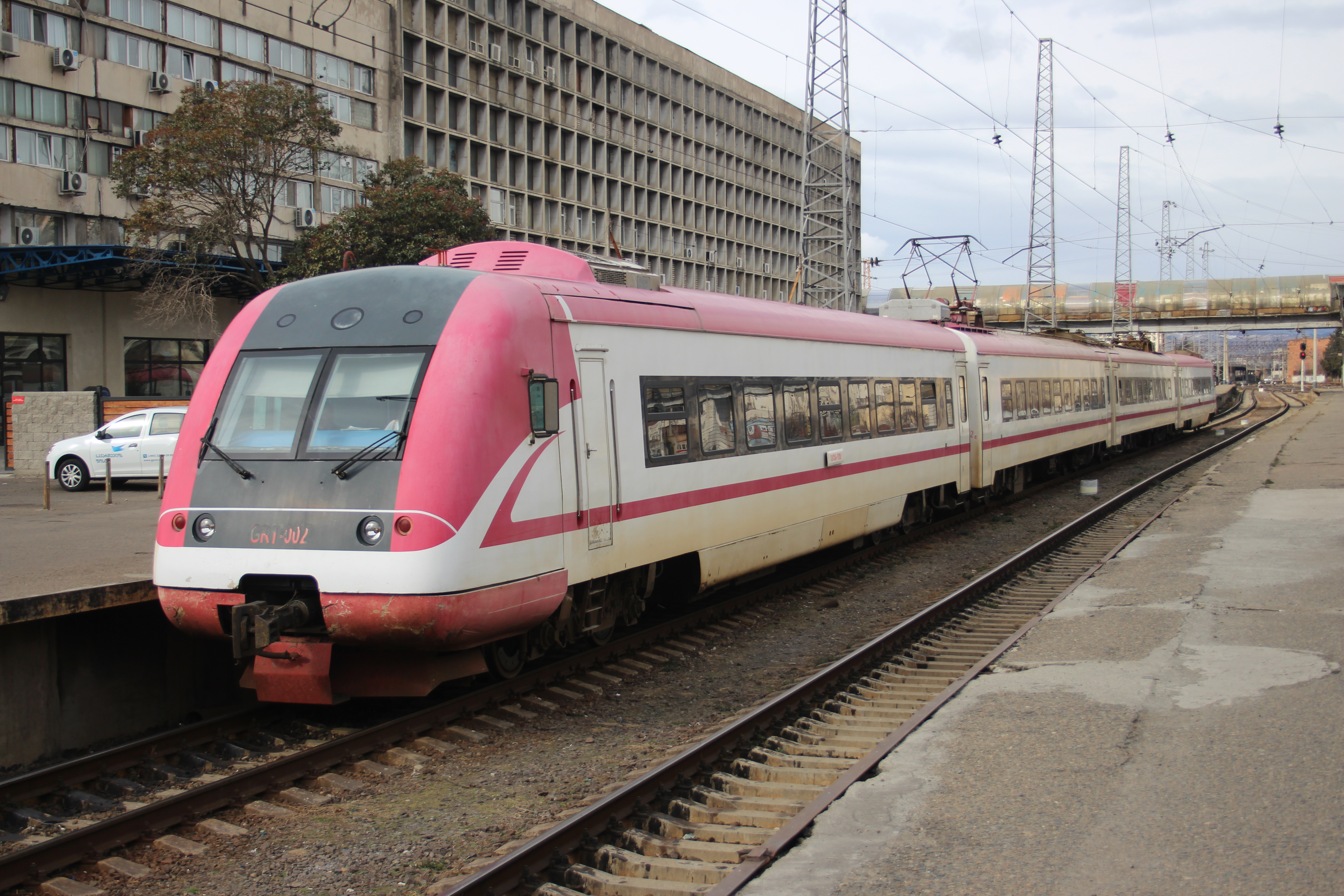
- GRT-002 at Tbilisi main station, arriving from Poti
- Manufacturer: CSR Corporation Limited
- Number built: 8
- Formation: 4 cars per trainset
- Operator: Georgian Railways

Specifications
- Maximum speed: 130 km/h (81 mph)
- Electric system: 3 kV DC overhead
- Current collection: Pantograph
- Track gauge: 1,520 mm (4 ft 11 27/32 in) Russian gauge

The Class ვმკ (VMK) and its successor GRT is an EMU (Electric multiple unit) by CSR Corporation Limited with the top speed of 130 km/h, operated by Georgian Railways under 3 kV DC overhead wires on cross-country routes.

== Gallery ==
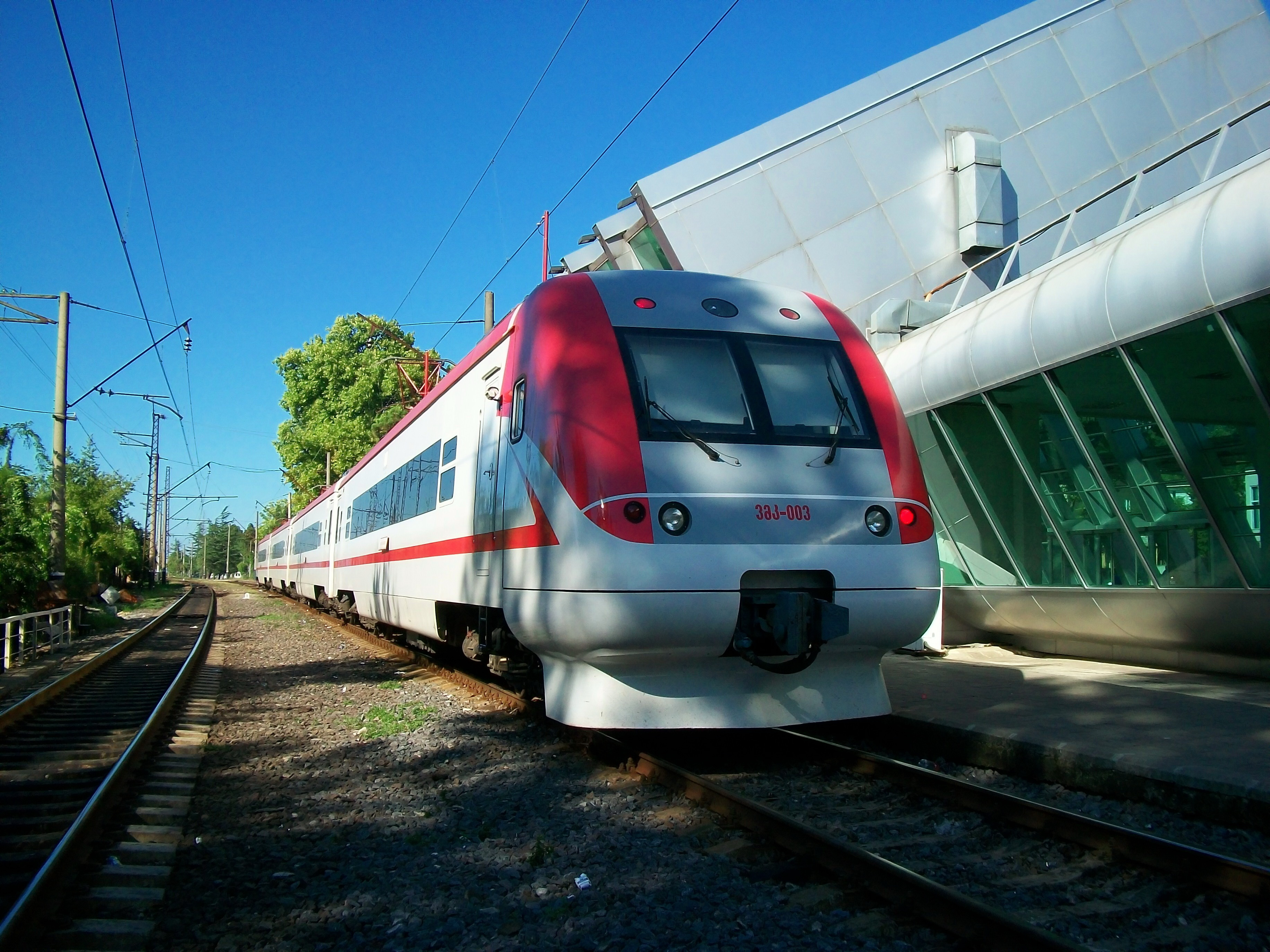
VMK-003 at Makhinjauri railway station in Batumi

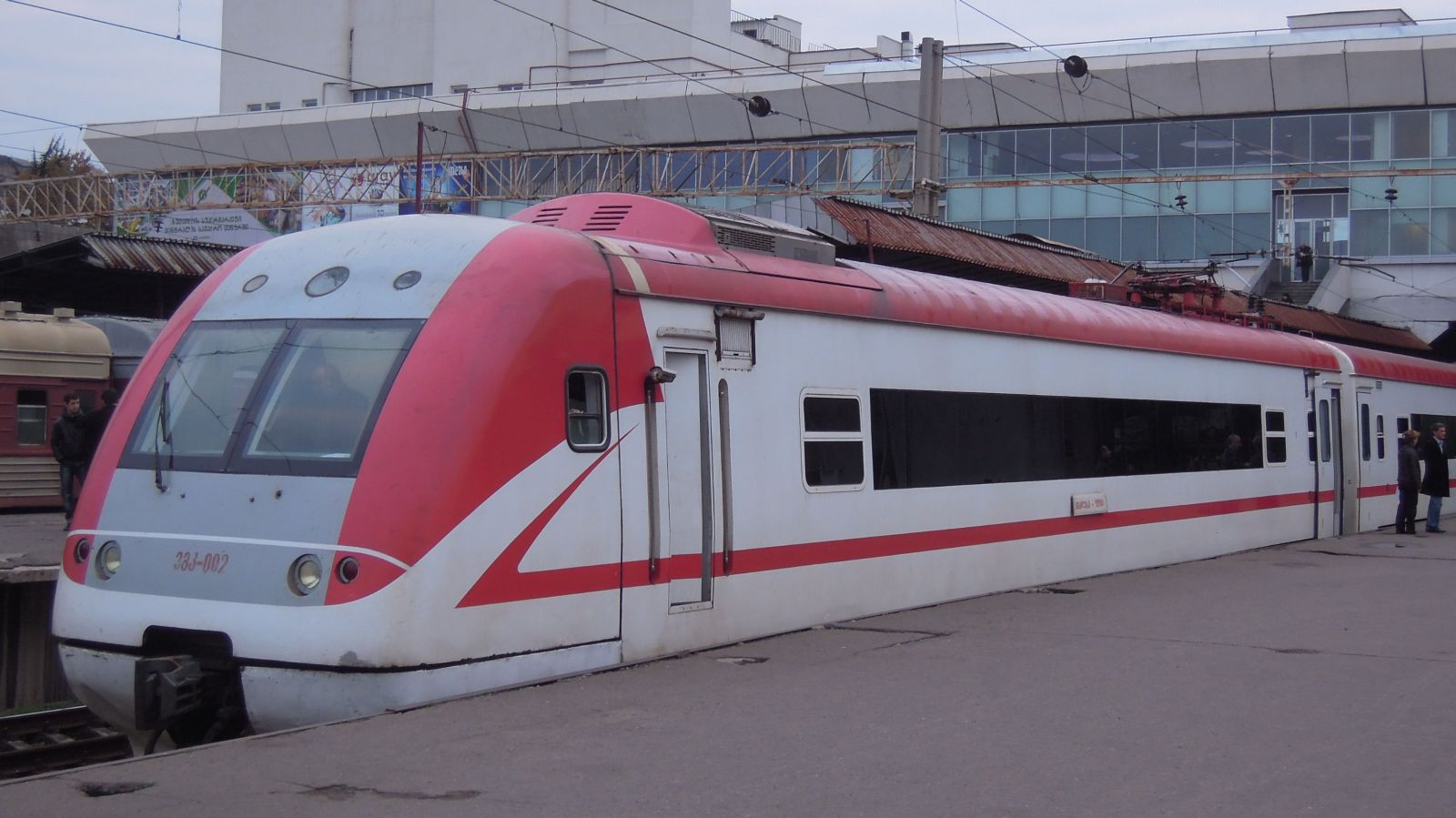
VMK-002 at Tbilisi railway station.

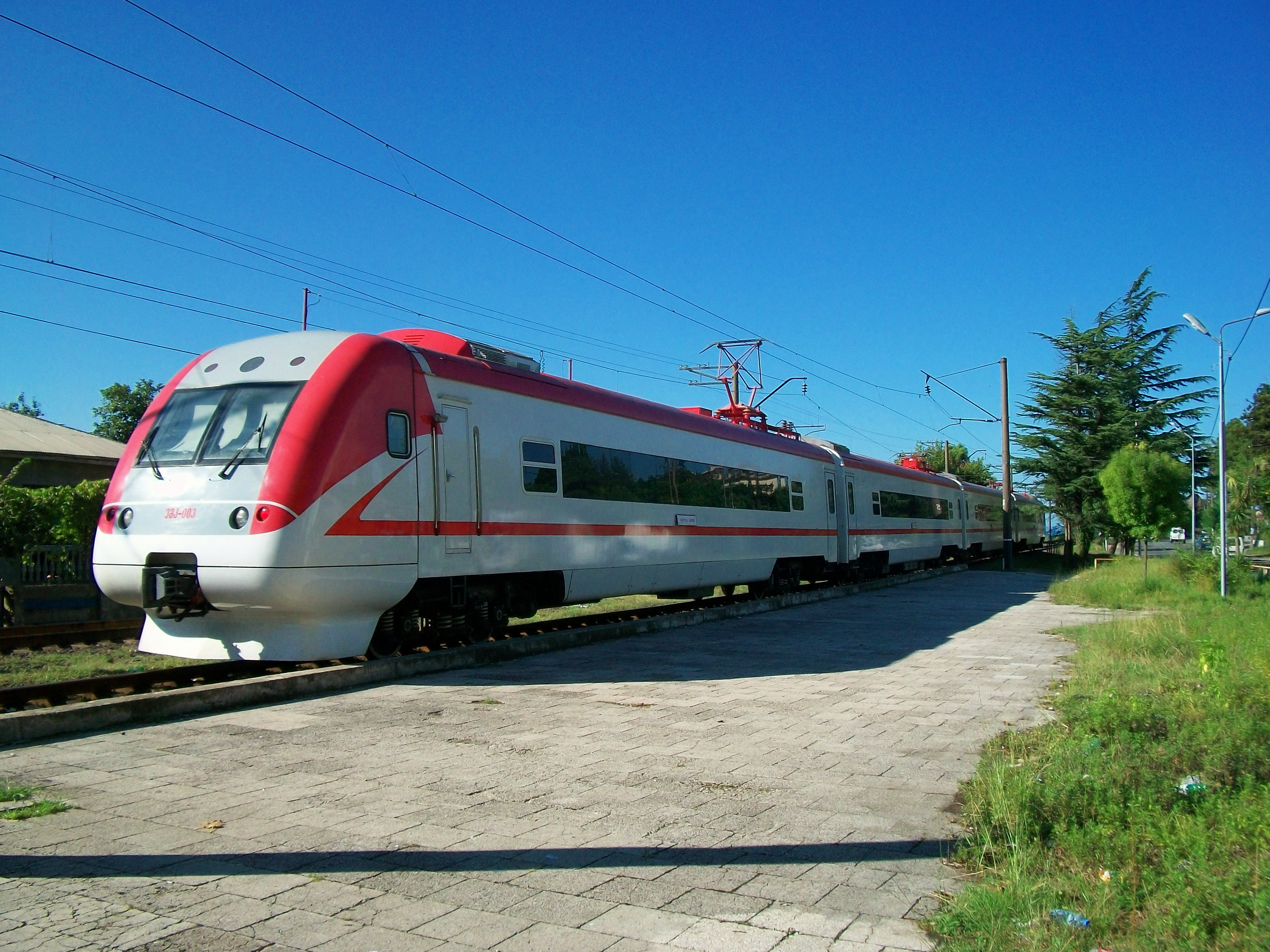
VMK-003 heading to Tbilisi

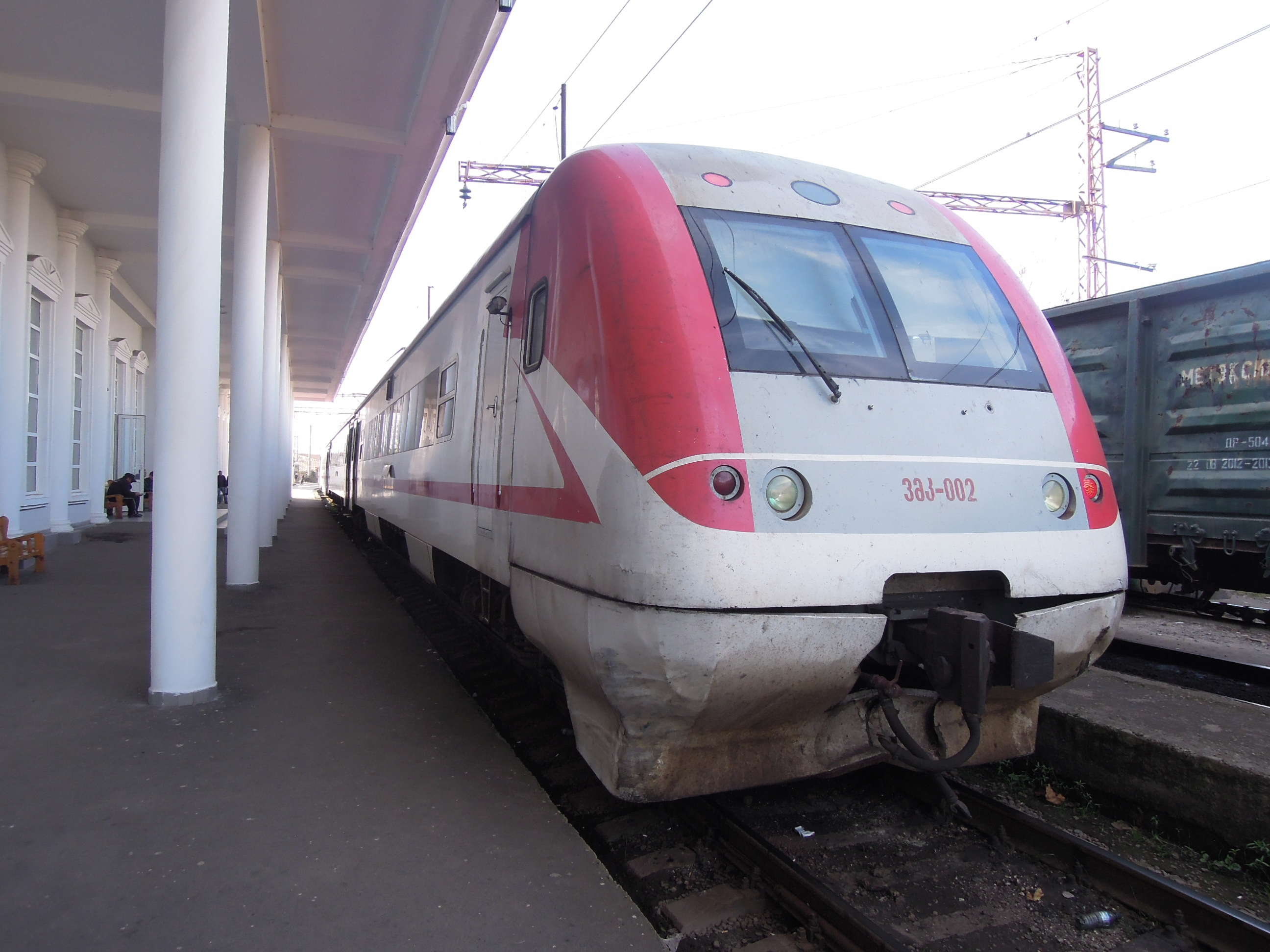
VMK-002 at Poti railway station.
