= Vazha-Pshavela (Tbilisi Metro) =

Tbilisi Metro Station

Vazha-Pshavela ვაჟა-ფშაველა
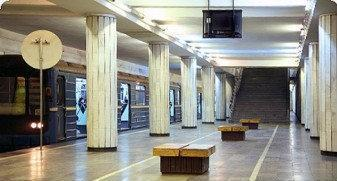

General information
- Coordinates: 41°43′27″N 44°43′51″E
- System: Tbilisi Metro station
- Line: Saburtalo Line
- Platforms: Island platform
- Tracks: 2 + 1 interlocking

Construction
- Platform levels: 1

History
- Opened: 3 April 2000
- Electrified: Third rail
- Former names: Bakhtrioni (April-June 2000)

Services
Preceding station	Tbilisi Metro	Following station
State University Terminus	Saburtalo Line	Delisi towards Station Square
Location

Vazha-Pshavela (Georgian: ვაჟა-ფშაველა Georgian pronunciation: [vaʒapʰʃaveła]) is a metro station on the Saburtalo Line in Tbilisi, Georgia. The station is named after the great Georgian poet Vazha-Pshavela. The station was opened on 3 April 2000. It is located on Vazha-Pshavela avenue close to the Vazha-Pshavela statue. The metro station serves Vazha-Pshavela blocks and nearby streets and upland neighborhoods of Saburtalo. The station walls have illustrations depicting Vazha-Pshavela's works.

Initially, the station was supposed to be an intermediate station on the Delisi – State University extension, but due to lack of financing the construction of the latter had been frozen. Because of the delay, only a single track was available at the station until the full extension to State University which opened on 16 October 2017.
