= Mir-Fatah-Agha =

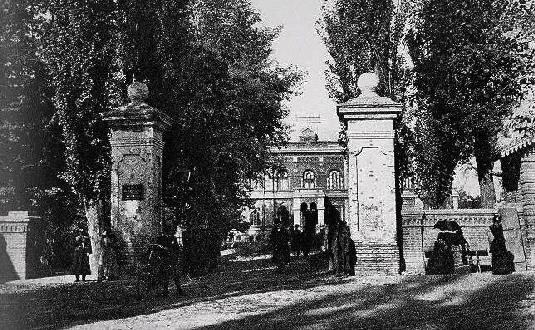
Entrance of the Mushthaid Garden, 1890s

Mir-Fatah-Agha, commonly known as Mushthaid (died 24 October 1892), was a high-ranking Twelver Shi'a Muslim cleric (specifically, a mujtahid) from Tabriz (Persian Azerbaijan, Qajar Empire), whom the Russian government credited with keeping the Muslim population of the Caucasus loyal to the Russians, following their recent expansion and conquering of the Caucasus at the expense of Qajar Persia.

The Qajar Persian empire, which had reasserted century-long Iranian suzerainty over the Caucasus following the ascension of Agha Mohammad Khan Qajar, had eventually indefinitely lost all their territories in the North and South Caucasus during the Russo-Persian War (1804–1813) and Russo-Persian War (1826–1828). In 1828, after the Russian victory in the Russo-Persian War (1826–1828) and the ceding of the final Persian territories in the greater Caucasus region to Russia, Ivan Paskevich, then governor-general in the newly conquered regions wrote a letter to St. Petersburg to propose that Mir-Fettakh a high Muslim cleric from Tabriz, Persia, should be made head of the Muslim ulema in the Caucasus. Russia had already created an assembly in 1794 in Crimea as an intention to connect the state with its Muslim subjects and their precise responsibilities being changed in response to demands from St. Petersburg. Paskevich hoped that by the help of Mir-Fettakh's high stature in the Muslim community, he could make a very valuable contribution to the Russian consolidation of power in the Caucasus. The Russians however did not seem aware this could cause a problem as Mir-Fettakh was a Shia, while the majority of the Muslims in the Caucasus were Sunni. On a related note, the Russian administration did realize eventually that only religious figures from the Caucasus could have significant influence in the region.

Nevertheless, Mir-Fettakh was appointed head of this spiritual assembly in the entire Caucasus and he would continue to dominate the administration according to his ideas for the next decade. He proved his worth many times as he kept the Shiite population quiet in the 1829 Murid uprisings in the North Caucasus, but even persuaded many to fight amongst the Russian ranks. However, things made a drastic turn when Paskevich was made to combat the Polish insurrection in 1831 in Warsaw. Under his successor, General Rosen, the Murid uprisings proved themselves to be capable of setting firm resistance under the rebellious Imam Shamil, which made the Russians reluctant to create a strong Muslim leader under its own auspices. Slowly but eventually, the power and hegemony of Mir-Fettakh as head of the Muslim community was decimated. After many petitions and misfortunes in his personal life, he returned to Persia in 1841. In 1839, Rosen was followed by Yevegni Golovin. He sealed the further future of the Caucasian Muslims. According to him, the sole reason why figures like Imam Shamil had only gained influence due to the corrupt rule of the khans appointed by the Qajar dynasty who had ruled the regions quasi-independently for centuries. He and other members of the Caucasus administration would openly advocate a policy of making Islam decline and erode in the following years to come expecting a natural and eventual Russification.

While being an adviser to Ivan Paskevich and head of the Assembly, he lived in Tiflis, Georgia (then recently part of the Russian Empire) where he established a famous garden on the left bank of the Kura River (Mtkvari) known as the Mushthaid Garden.

The disastrous events in the Caucasus which came some years after are believed to be due to Paskevich's and Mir-Fatah's departures from office, and the bad ruling policies of subsequent governor generals, which forced him to return to Tabriz in 1841. Soon after his departure, the situation in the Caucasus worsened with the rise of figures such as Imam Shamil and others. It would take Russia around 50 years to fully annex the North Caucasus.
