= Saburtalo Line =

Tbilisi Metro line

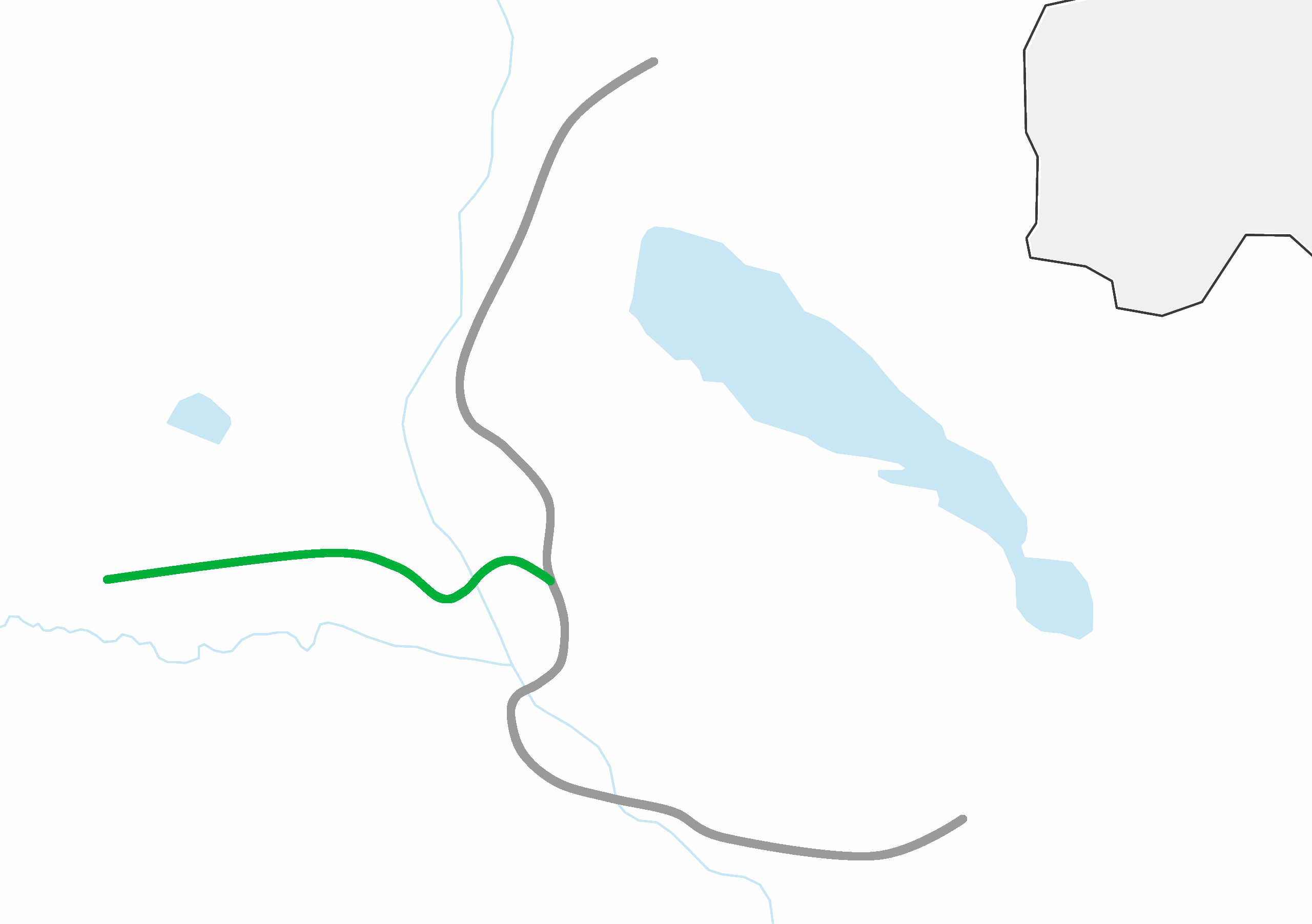

Overview
- Other name: Line Two
- Native name: საბურთალოს ხაზი
- Line number: 2
- Stations: 7

Service
- Type: Rapid transit
- System: Tbilisi Metro
- Operator(s): Tbilisi Transport Company
- Depot(s): Nazaladevi Electrodepot
- Rolling stock: 81-717M/714M (Tbilisi ZREPS)

History
- Opened: September 22, 1979; 46 years ago
- Last extension: 2017

Technical
- Track gauge: 1520mm
- Electrification: 750v (minimum) third rail

The Saburtalo Line (Georgian: საბურთალოს ხაზი, romanized: saburtalos khazi) is a line of the Tbilisi Metro in Georgia. The line was first opened in 1979, running originally from Station Square, where Tbilisi Central Railway station is located to Delisi and has since extended to the western residential districts of the city, near Tbilisi State University’s X and XI buildings. It is a second line of the system and runs from the east and west direction of Tbilisi, in contrast to the First Line which runs north-south axis of the city. The line is named after Saburtalo, the district, and neighbourhood of Tbilisi, where 5 (Note: These are Technical University, Medical University, Delisi, Vazha-Pshavela, and State University stations.) of 7 stations of this line are located. Alternatively, the line is being referred to simply as 2nd Line.

== History ==
| Segment | Date opened |
|---|---|
| Station Square–Delisi | September 22, 1979 |
| Delisi–Vazha-Pshavela | April 3, 2000 |
| Vazha-Pshavela–State University | October 16, 2017 |

=== Name changes ===
| Station | Previous name(s) | Years |
|---|---|---|
| Medical University | Komkavshiri | 1979–1992 |
| Viktor Gotsiridze | Delisi | 1979–1995 |
| Delisi | Viktor Gotsiridze | 1995–2006 |

== Transfers ==
| # | Transfer to | At |
|---|---|---|
| 1 | Akhmeteli–Varketili Line (First Line) | Station Square |

Station Square is the eastern terminus and the transfer station to the First Line. The Station Square platforms of the Saburtalo line and the First line are placed parallel to each other and are connected by a 50-meter relatively narrow corridor. Since Station Square is the terminus station of the Saburtalo line, the platform and transfer corridor at rush hours may be extremely congested.

== Rolling stock ==
The line is served by the Nadzaladevi (No.1) depot. Currently, 9 four-carriage trains are assigned to it. All are the 81-714/717 versions with .5 modifications. Additional Ema-502M cars were supplied, causing an inconsistency in the cars' design.

== Recent developments and potential expansions ==
The western extension of the line has been frozen for some time before Vazha-Pshavela station opened in the year 2000. It was the first metro station to be opened in independent Georgia. Construction of the State University station (Sakhelmtsipo Universiteti), which dates back to the Soviet era and was suspended for 22 years, was restarted in July 2015 and was completed in October 2017. In perspective, the line might continue to the east.

Older potential development plans included either making the Saburtalo line a circular line continuing in the east towards the direction of Sabcho (Nowadays, Chitaia) Square, Saarbrücken Square, and to Rustaveli station as a transfer station and then towards the direction of Vake and back to Saburtalo. Alternative development option included continuing towards Kukia and eastern Tbilisi Sea settlements.
