= Mushthaid Garden =

Garden in Tbilisi

Coordinates: 41.72174°N 44.78632°E

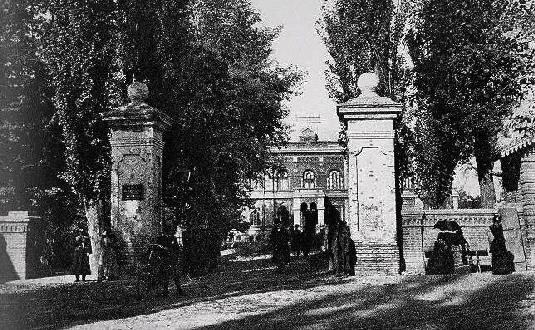
Entrance of the Mushthaid Garden, 1890s

The Musthaid Garden (Georgian: მუშთაიდის ბაღი) was established between the 1830s and 1840s, by Mir-Fatah-Agha, a high-ranked Shia Muslim religious leader of the Persian Shiites - a Mujtahid (hence the name Mushtaid), who fled from Iran to Tiflis (Tbilisi) during the Persian Qajar dynasty. According to the legend, Mir-Fatah-Agha chose Tbilisi as his residence place due to his love to his Georgian wife who died earlier.

In 1853, the authorities obtained the control of the garden to set up an example agricultural farm there. In 1858, it was turned into a public recreation centre. In 1935 one of the world's first children's railways has been established here. One of the remarkable features of the garden is the alley of local relict trees, Zelkova.

Apart from usual facilities - the restaurant, snack bar, open-air theatre, etc., in 1887 the Caucasian silkworm rearing station was founded in the territory of the Mushthaid Garden under the supervision of Nikolai Nikolaevich Shavrov (1858 -1915). The main building of the station was constructed in 1892 (architect Alexandre Shimkevich, with N. Shavrov taking part in planning) and it is preserved till today, with its present address being: 6, G. Tsabadze St., Tbilisi, now sheltering the State Silk Museum of Georgia, one of the world's oldest silk museums, a two-storey building that belongs to the eclectic style.

The garden occupies an area of approximately 110,000 square metres.

During the second half of the 19th century, receptions of high-ranking guests were held in the garden.

Today, the Mushthaid Garden is a popular spot in Tbilisi where the locals walk and rest at leisure. It is known for the attraction of curved mirrors, etc.
