= Tbilisi railway station =

Railway station in Tbilisi, Georgia

Tbilisi
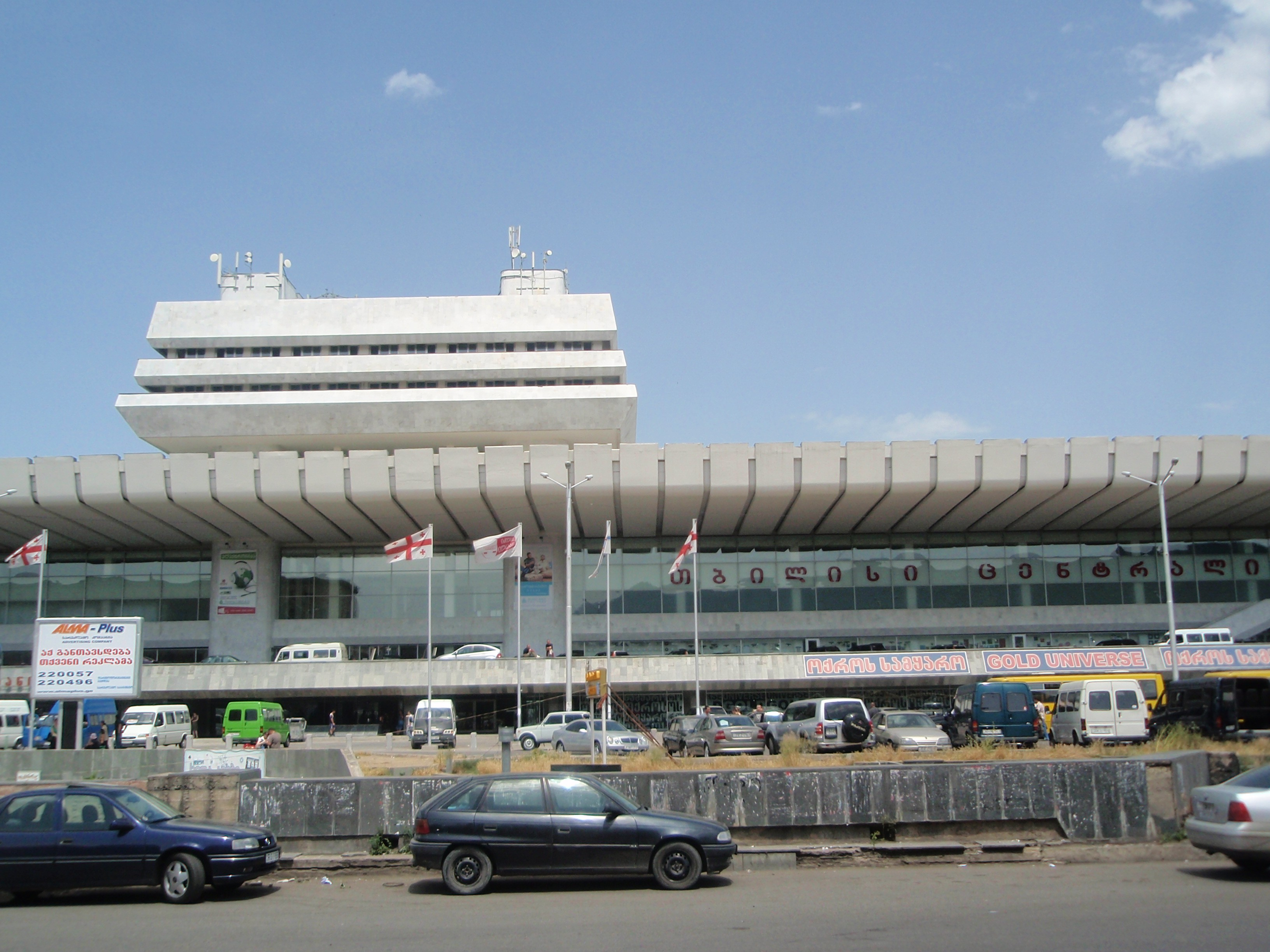

General information
- Location: Tbilisi, Georgia
- Coordinates: 41.720953°N 44.799339°E
- System: Georgian Railway terminal
- Owner: Georgian Railway
- Platforms: 3
- Connections: Sadguris Moedani I Sadguris Moedani II Akhmeteli–Varketili Line Saburtalo Line

Construction
- Parking: yes

History
- Opened: 1872

Services
Preceding station	Georgian Railway	Following station
Zages towards Zugdidi	Zugdidi – Tbilisi	Terminus
Terminus	Zugdidi – Gardabani	Tbilisi (Samgori) towards Gardabani
Terminus	Tbilisi – Sadakhlo	Tbilisi (Samgori) towards Sadakhlo
Terminus	Tbilisi – Dedoplistsqaro	Tbilisi (Samgori) towards Dedoplistsqaro
Terminus	Tbilisi – Tbilisi Airport	Tbilisi (Samgori) towards Tbilisi Airport
Marabda towards Kars, Turkey	Baku–Tbilisi–Kars	Reverses direction
Baku, Azerbaijan Terminus	Baku–Tbilisi–Kars	Reverses direction
Terminus	Kars–Gyumri–Tbilisi	Tbilisi (Samgori) towards Kars, Turkey
Location

Tbilisi Railway station (Georgian: თბილისის ცენტრალური სადგური, tbilisis tsent'raluri sadguri) is a railway station located in Tbilisi, Georgia. Originally built in 1872, Tbilisi Railway station has undergone various architectural transformations, and currently serves as a combined railway station and shopping mall.

== History ==
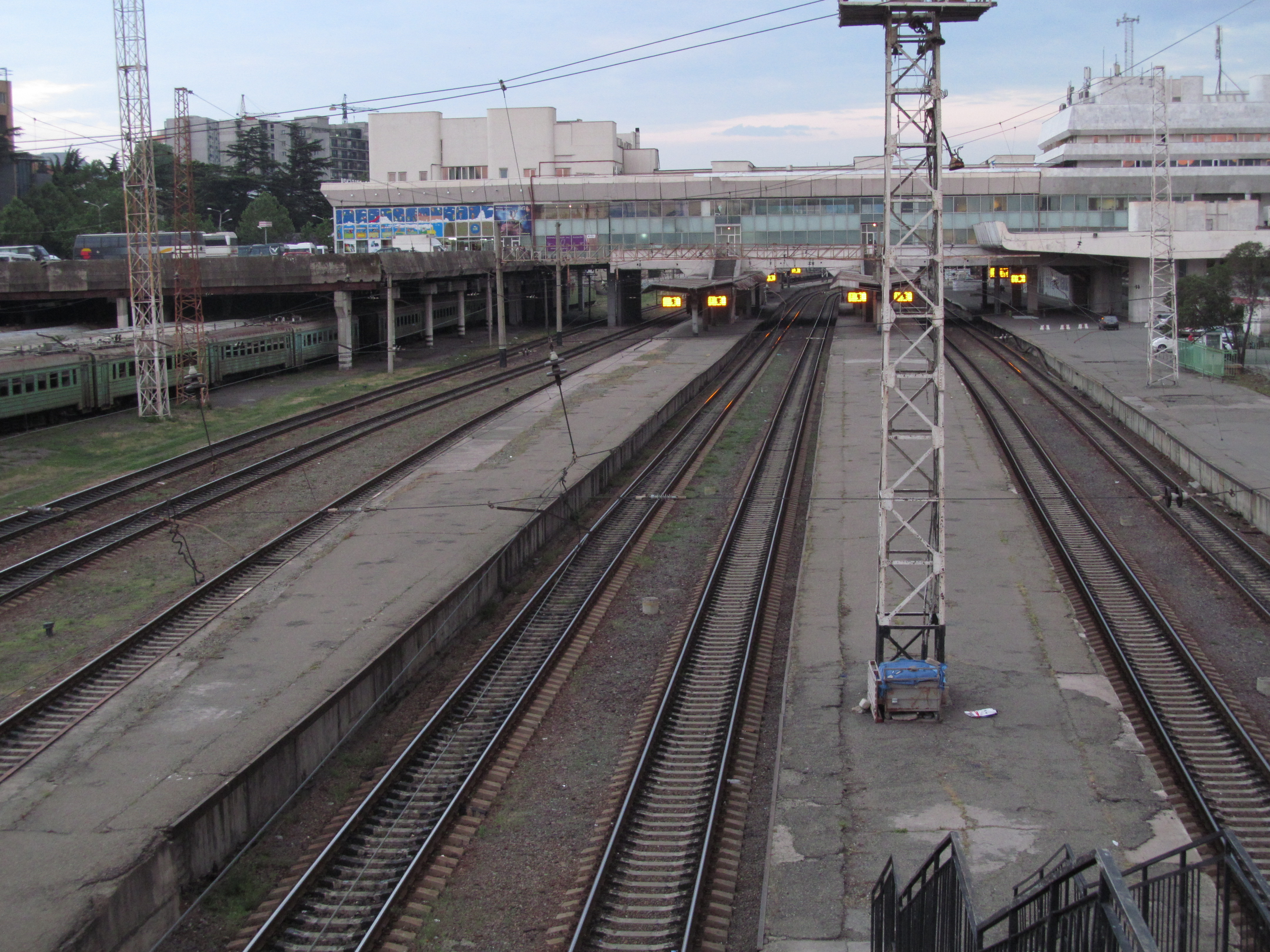
The three platforms

Tbilisi Railway station is the central railway station of Tbilisi with an adjacent shopping mall. The first central station in Tbilisi was built in 1872, with trains to the black sea port of Poti. In the 1940s the building was demolished and replaced with a building in the style of the Stalinist architecture. In the early 1980s the building was demolished and replaced by a building in the style of the Brutalist architecture. The architects Bairamashvili, Kavlashvili, G. Shavdia and Jibladze won a State Prize for their work in 1992. The station was renovated and converted into a combined train station and shopping center in 2010. The architects Zwarts & Jansma were responsible for the transformation.

The station is served by two subway stations of Tbilisi Metro, Sadguris Moedani I and Sadguris Moedani II, which together form the only connection between the two lines of Tbilisi Metro.

There are daily inbound and outbound trains connecting Tbilisi and Yerevan, departing from Tbilisi railway station. From neighboring Armenia, trains depart to Tbilisi and Batumi from Yerevan railway station.

== Future ==
There was a project to replace the direct railway crossing Tbilisi by a bypass connection north of Tbilisi (Tbilisi Railway Bypass Project). The Tbilisi central station would be closed but remain a shopping mall. It would not be served any longer by passenger trains, and the existing infrastructure would be dismantled.

Instead of a central station the Didube station in the north and the Navtlugi station in the south-east of Tbilisi would become dead-end termini for passenger trains. Because of this a through connection for passenger trains and direct passenger transfers would no longer be possible. Instead of the expected reduction of environmental and traffic problems the axing would probably cause more traffic problems, because the public transport and underground transport system of the capital is optimized for the central station. Although argued otherwise by the American consulting firm Booz Allen Hamilton, the project was therefore very much disputed by Western European transportation specialists and railway companies.

Construction of the bypass railtrack was suspended in 2013, effectively ending the Tbilisi Railway Bypass Project. According to plans revealed by the city government in 2018, the existing infrastructure for the bypass project will be integrated into a new line of Tbilisi Metro.

== See also ==
- Georgian Railway
