= Saburtalo District =

Saburtalo District საბურთალოს რაიონი
- Tbilisi District
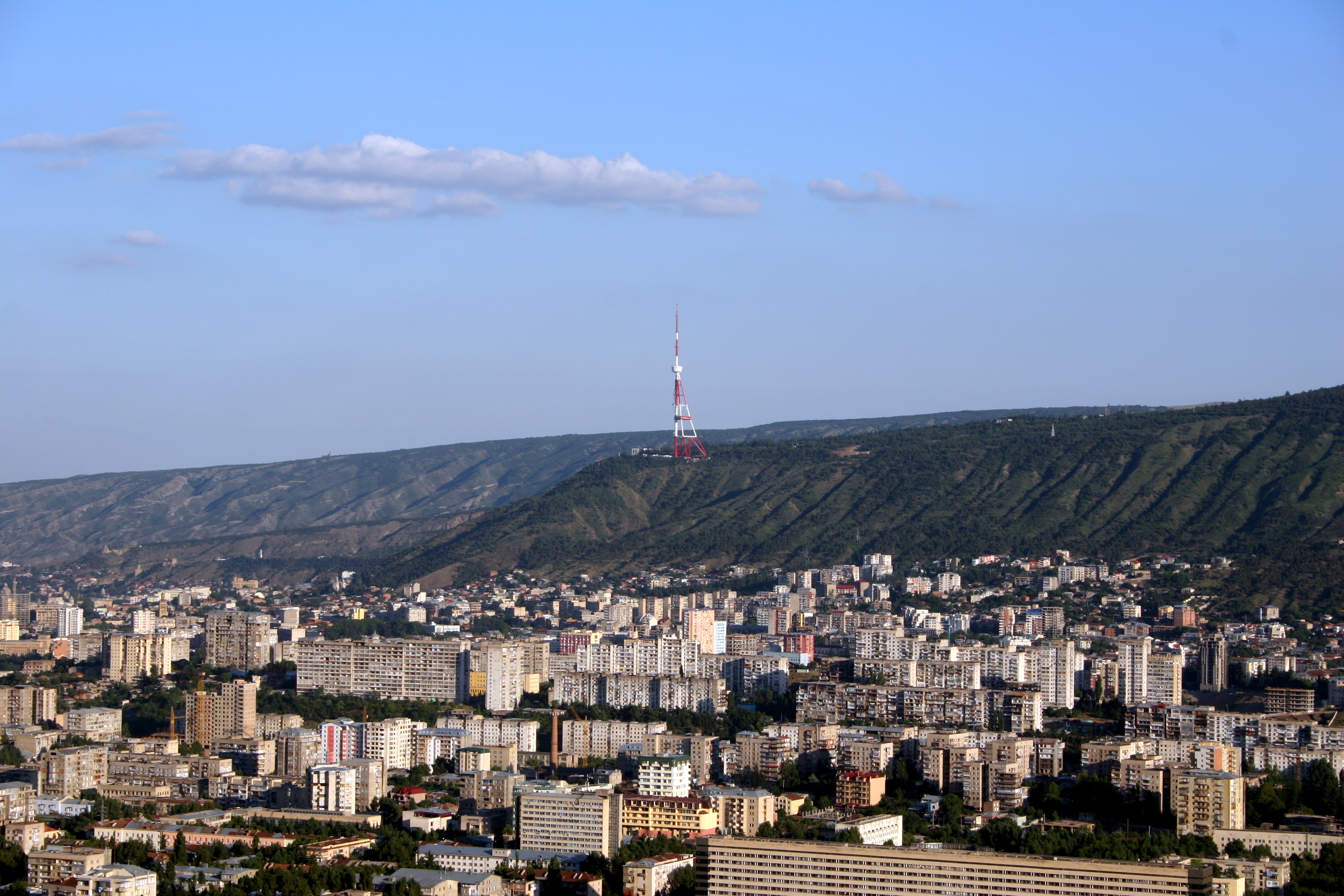

- Location within Tbilisi
- Country: Georgia
- City: Tbilisi
- Administracion HQ: 29 Adam Mickiewicz Str, Tbilisi

Government
  - Body: Administration of district
  - Head of district: Gaioz Vasadze

Population (2017)
  - Total: 139,000
- Time zone: UTC+4 (Georgian Time)
- Website: www.tbilisi.gov.ge

Saburtalo is an administrative district (raioni) in Tbilisi, capital of Georgia.

Saburtalo District includes the neighborhoods of Lower Saburtalo, Vedzisi, Lisi, Vashlijvari, Didi Dighomi, Patara Dighomi, Dighomi village, Zurgovana, Telovani, and Didgori.

== Vashlijvari ==
Vashlijvari (Georgian: ვაშლიჯვარი; lit. the "apple cross") is a neighborhood of Saburtalo District of the Georgian capital city Tbilisi. Vashlijvari is located on the right side of the river Mtkvari, between Saburtalo district and Dighomi and it's situated nearby to Dighomi Massive I Block, and close to Dighomi Massive II Block. A village formerly, Vashlijvari joined Tbilisi in 1972. Vashlijvari has been developed since the 1980s.
