= State University (Tbilisi Metro) =

Tbilisi Metro station

State University სახელმწიფო უნივერსიტეტი
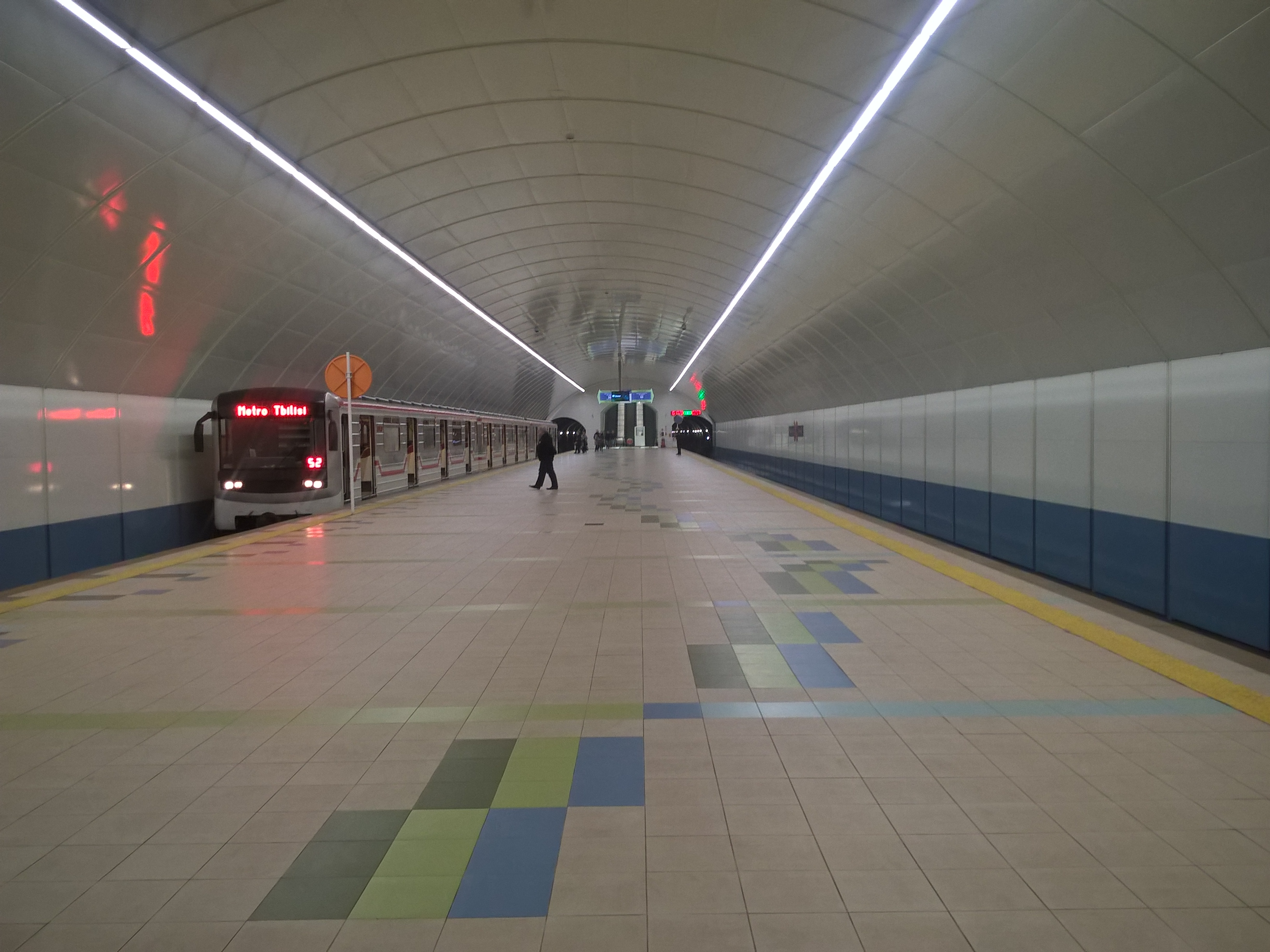

General information
- Coordinates: 41°43′22″N 44°43′03″E
- System: Tbilisi Metro station
- Platforms: Island platform
- Tracks: 2

Construction
- Platform levels: 1

History
- Opened: 16 October 2017

Services
Preceding station	Tbilisi Metro	Following station
Terminus	Saburtalo Line	Vazha-Pshavela towards Station Square
Location

The State University metro station (Georgian: სახელმწიფო უნივერსიტეტი, romanized: sakhelmts'ipo universit'et'i) is located on Saburtalo Line in Tbilisi, Georgia. It is the western terminus of the Saburtalo Line.

Construction of the State University station began in 1985 but ceased due to financial difficulties in 1994 and conserved in 2000. The station was completed close between 2015 and 2017 with the help of the Asian Development Bank. It was opened on 16 October 2017. Shortly after opening, in January 2018, Siemens fitted a modern signaling system which covers 2.6 km of track which stretches from Delisi to State University, and electronically controls all the interlockings on this segment, which includes State University.

== See also ==
- A List of All Tbilisi metro stations
