= Tbilisi Metro =

Rapid transit system of Tbilisi, Georgia

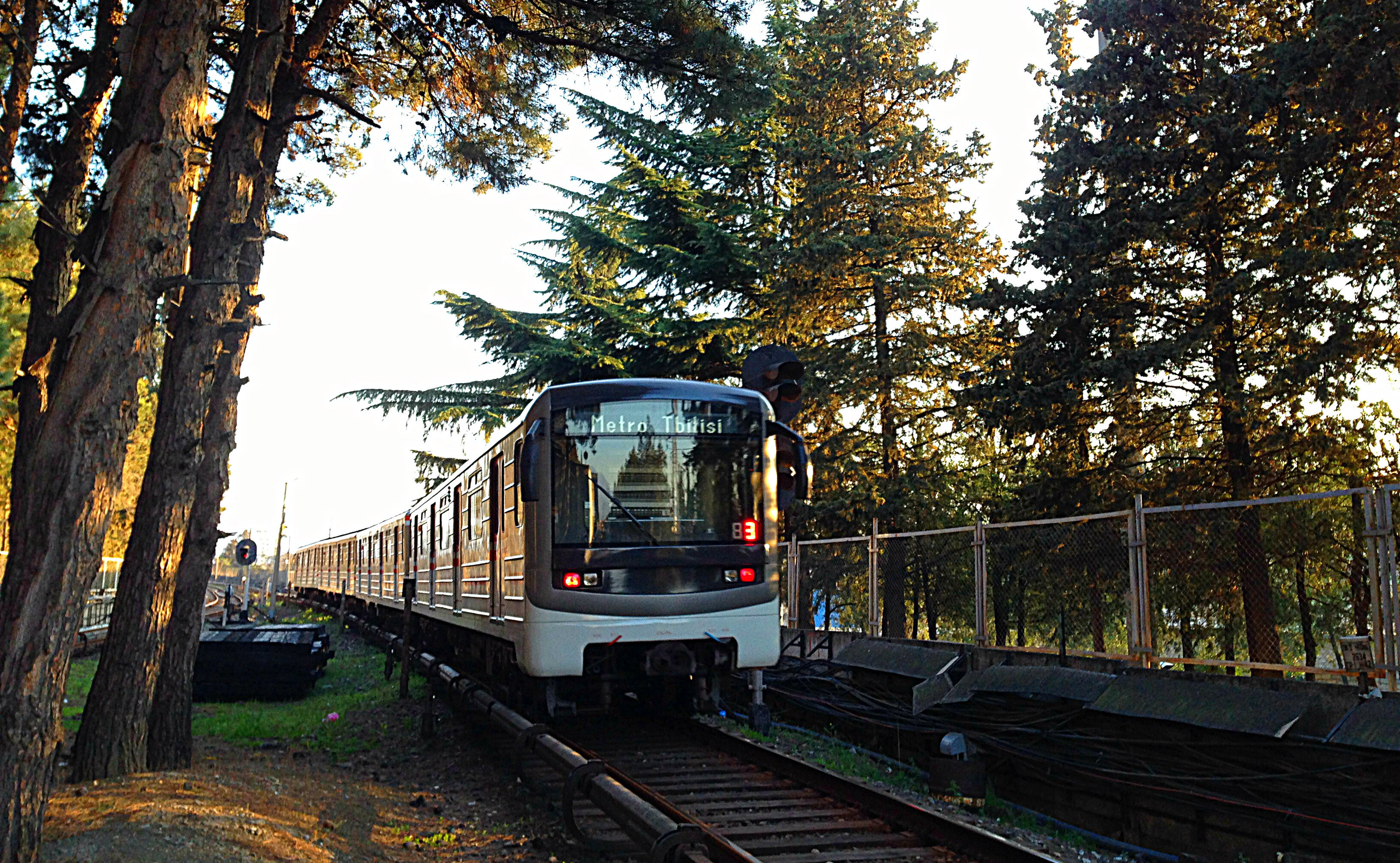
- Metro Carriage on the Open Section of the First Line.

Overview
- Native name: თბილისის მეტროპოლიტენი tbilisis metropoliteni
- Locale: Tbilisi, Georgia
- Transit type: Rapid transit
- Number of lines: 2
- Number of stations: 23
- Daily ridership: ≈500 000 (avg. weekday, 2023) Peak: 653 060 (15 December 2023)
- Annual ridership: ▲138.8 million (2019)
- Website: Tbilisi Transport Company

Operation
- Began operation: 11 January 1966; 60 years ago
- Operator: Tbilisi Transport Company
- Number of vehicles: 192
- Train length: 4 cars

Technical
- System length: 28.6 km (17.8 mi)
- Track gauge: 1,520 mm (4 ft 11 27/32 in)
- Average speed: 33 km/h (21 mph)
- Top speed: 80 km/h (50 mph)
System map

The Tbilisi Metro (Georgian: თბილისის მეტროპოლიტენი, romanized: tbilisis met'rop'olit'eni) is a rapid transit system in the Georgian capital Tbilisi. Opened on 11 January 1966, it was the fourth metro system in the former Soviet Union. Like other Soviet-built metros, most of the stations are very deep and vividly decorated.

At present, the system consists of two lines, 28.6 kilometres (17.8 mi) in total length, serving 23 stations. In 2017, the Metro transported 113.827 million passengers. The Metro is operated by the Tbilisi Transport Company, which began operation the same year as the Tbilisi Metro, in 1966.

== History ==
=== Initial construction ===
Tbilisi (officially known as Tiflis until 1936), the capital of Georgia, was considered historically to be one of the most important cities of the Soviet Union, particularly because of its political position as being the most significant city in the Caucasus and the capital of the Transcaucasian Socialist Federative Soviet Republic, which lasted until 1936. The city grew rapidly during the 19th and 20th centuries, and apart from being a cultural and political centre, it was also an important transport hub in Transcaucasia and an industrial centre as well. Features of the historically established development of Tbilisi, stretching for more than 25 km (16 mi) along the Mtkvari river, densely built-up city centre, and narrow steep streets in some parts of the city, impede the development of land transport. All this contributed to the need for a rapid transit Metro system. Especially considering its geographic characteristic – Tbilisi is considerably long – which undoubtedly would simplify the coverage of most parts of the city by the underground.

Construction began in 1952. Tbilisi was one of the few cities in the former USSR where work on the Metro system started before the population reached one million people. A population of over a million people was one of the main requirements for Soviet cities to build a metro system.

On 11 January 1966, the Tbilisi Metro was opened: it was the first and only Metro system in Georgia and the fourth one in the former Soviet Union (after Moscow, Saint Petersburg, and Kyiv) when the first six stations were opened. Since then, the system has steadily grown into a two-line, 23-station network.

=== Further development ===
During the 1990s, most of the Soviet-era station names were changed, although financial difficulties after the breakup of the Soviet Union hit the Metro particularly hard in its infrastructure, operations, and extensions. In the early mid-1990s, the Tbilisi metro was usually not working due to the lack of electricity. During that period, the Metro was underfunded, operated in severe difficulties due to poor electrical supply, and also become infamous for widespread petty crime, like pickpocketing and mugging. However, crime has reduced as a result of security and administration reforms in the system from 2004 to 2005. Other services have also significantly improved.

== Modernization efforts ==
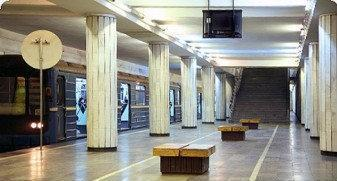
The Vazha-Pshavela station was opened in 2000, the first station to be opened in independent Georgia, after the fall of the Soviet Union

In the 2000s, the Tbilisi Metro entered a modernization phase. In addition, two new stations were opened: Vazha-Pshavela in 2000 and State University in 2017.

The Tbilisi Metro system is undergoing a major rehabilitation effort, including the reconstruction of the stations as well as the modernization of trains and other facilities. The city's 2006 budget allocated 16 million lari for this project. Former President of Georgia Mikheil Saakashvili promised to make the Metro a most prestigious public transport system, and charged the Director General of Tbilisi Metro, Zurab Kikalishvili, in late 2005, to bring the metro up to European standards by 2007. In 2005 began the renovation process of subway trains. As part of the modernization, the Soviet-era rolling stock was overhauled, old parts were replaced with new ones, the interior of the car was changed, and the exterior was given a different look. Additionally, the driver cab was equipped with a modern control panel.

In subsequent years, however, the upgrade process slowed significantly, and as of July 2010, the Tbilisi Metro was still far from its target standard. Some renovated metro stations had to be repaired again soon due to deficient planning and poor quality of the renovation. The renovation process of the system continues unfortunately slowly and there are several stations under renovation. As of 2023 Tbilisi City Hall purchased 10 4-car trains for Tbilisi Metro from Metrowagonmash, which will meet European standards.

The extension of the Saburtalo Line to State University station began in 1985. In 1993, the construction was stopped and it went into conservation mode. In January 2012 construction was scheduled to start on a frozen extension of the Saburtalo Line from the Vazha-Pshavela station to the Sakhelmtsipo Universiteti (State University) station, of which 80% of the work was completed during the Soviet era. But it was only restarted in July 2015 with financial help from the Asian Development Bank and the station was finally opened to the public on 16 October 2017. The new State University station meets modern standards and is equipped with new technologies. Additionally, the Delisi-Vazha-Pshavela tunnel was also opened.

In February 2021, Gotsiridze station was renovated, and was scheduled to be completed within 3 months. Trains did not stop while construction works were in progress, passing through the station. However, reconstruction works were only completed in March 2023, with facilities dedicated to the disabled such as new elevators and tactile paths.

In February 2023, Varketili (Tbilisi Metro) was renovated, it was supposed to be completed within a few months. During january of 2026 only the escalators and metro was renovated, however the top escalator part is yet to be renovated.

=== Noise issues ===
The noise problem on the Tbilisi Metro can be attributed to various factors. The most significant cause is the aging infrastructure, as many sections of the metro system were constructed decades ago and have not undergone significant renovations or soundproofing measures. The trains themselves, the 81-717/14's and Ezh3's, produce high noise levels in relativity to modern rolling stock due to their outdated design and lack of noise reduction features. Additionally, the higher-speed operation of the trains with the rolling stock's non-asynchronous motors, combined with the confined space of the underground tunnels, amplifies the noise and creates a discomforting environment for passengers. The amplification is further increased by the interior shell of the tunnels, which are covered in concrete.

The impact of excessive noise on the Tbilisi Metro has been a matter of concern for both commuters and metro authorities. Prolonged exposure to loud noise can lead to various health issues, including hearing loss, stress, and sleep disturbances. Furthermore, the noise problem creates an unpleasant travel experience and reduces the overall quality of the metro system. To tackle the noise issue directly at its source, the Mayor's Office has invested in the procurement of new trains with advanced noise reduction technology. These modern trains are designed to minimize noise emissions and provide a quieter and more comfortable journey for passengers. The Metro easily reaches over 90db, which is a dangerous level for human health. Despite noise being a very frequent complaint from many commuters, leadership has not yet released any statement regarding a plan to combat the issue.

In 2019, the complete rehabilitation of power lines and ventilation systems in the metro began. With the replacement of the 450-kilometer (280 mi) power cable, 32 new fans will be installed. The Asian Development Bank has allocated $15 million for this project.

== Rolling stock upgrades ==
The government of Tbilisi, through partial funding from the European Bank for Reconstruction and Development, spent more than 48 million Euros on purchasing 44, new, modern metro cars or 10 train sets in February 2023 from Metrowagonmash, bringing the system's outdated rolling stock up to date. Moreover, the depot and the connecting tunnel will be rehabilitated as a part of the project to support the new trains. This is the first major rolling stock update for the network since it began operation more than 50 years ago.

In May 2023, the contract with Metrowagonmash was cancelled after the company was internationally sanctioned. Tbilisi has not lost interest in purchasing new rolling stock, and government officials are meeting with major rolling stock company representatives to start a new tender process.

In July 2025, The Tbilisi City Hall has awarded a $150 million tender to local company GT Group to supply 111 metro cars from Chinese state-owned manufacturer CRRC

== Network ==
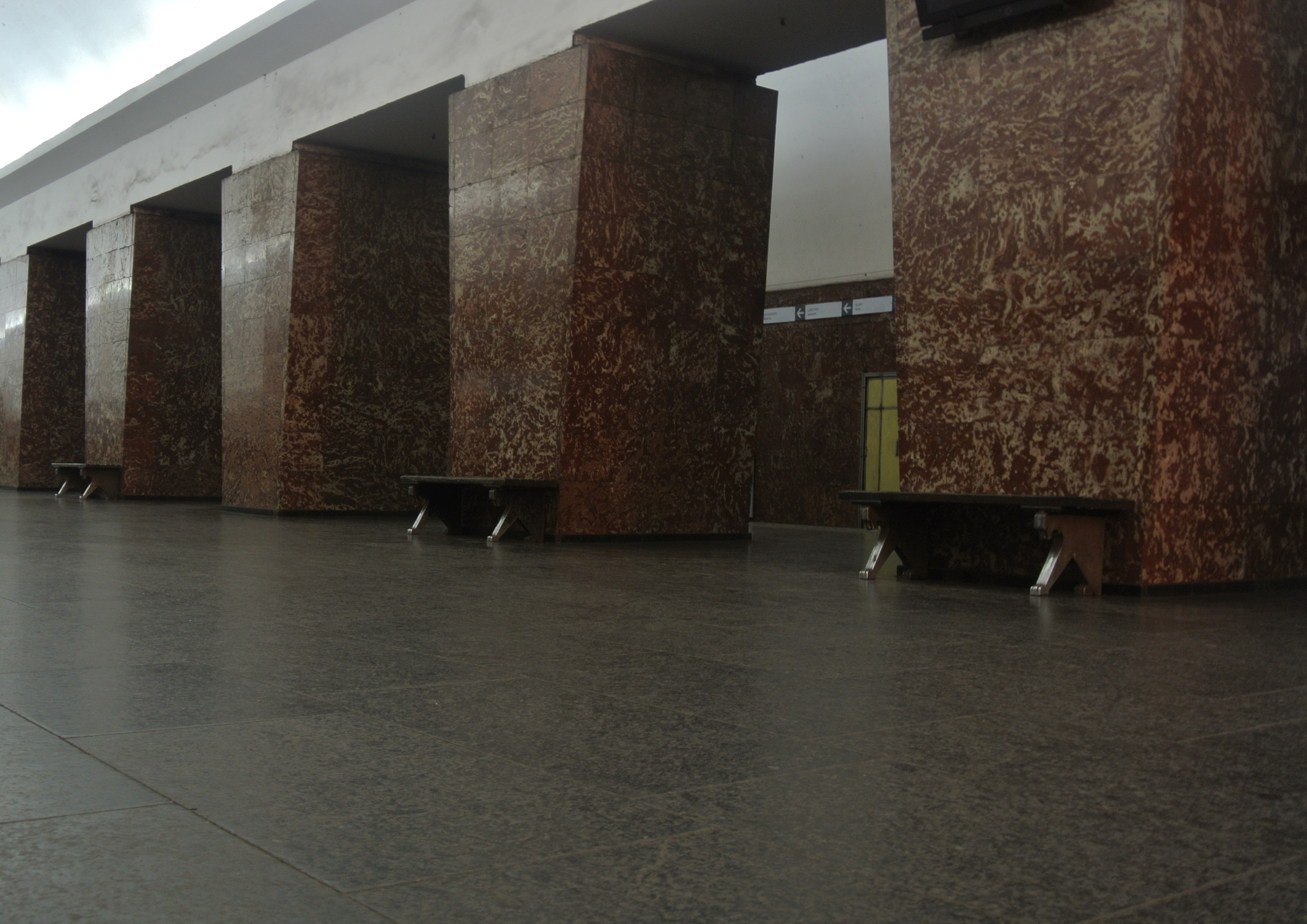
Rustaveli metro station

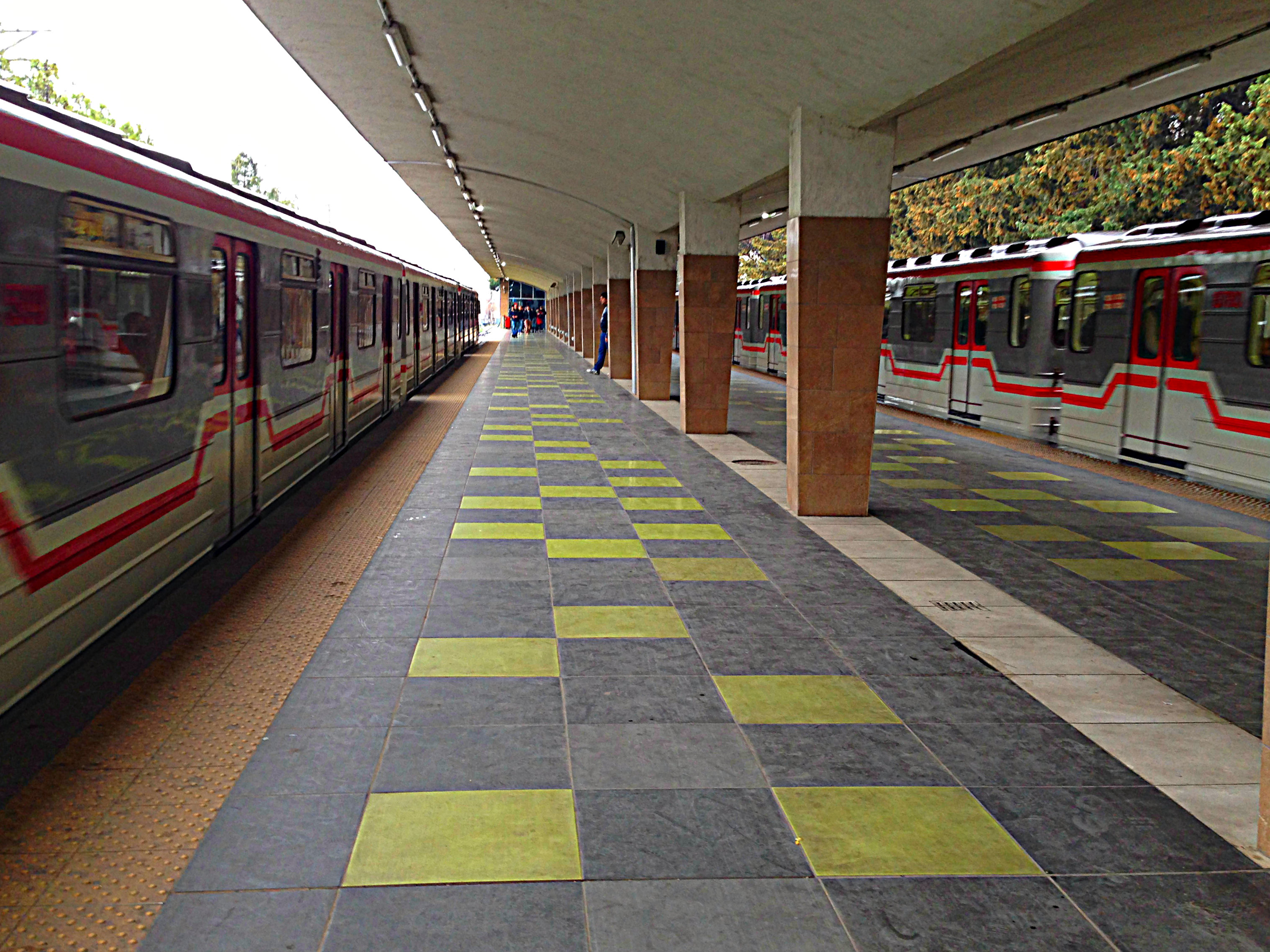
Didube metro station

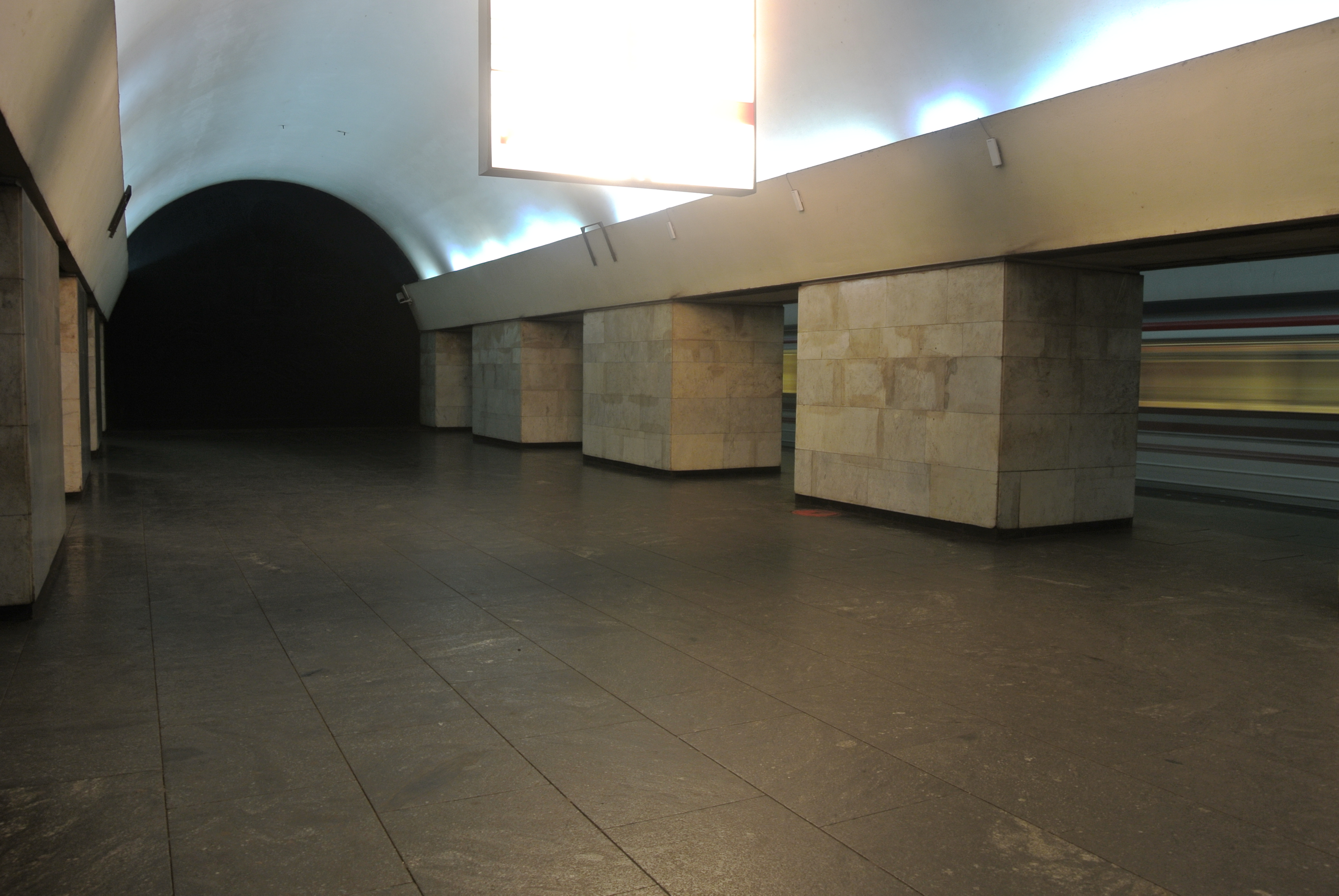
"300 (Samasi) Aragveli" station

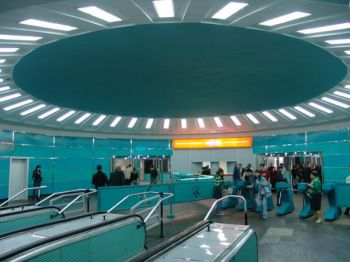
Tsereteli metro station

Current lines

No.	Name	Opened	Length	Stations
1	Akhmeteli–Varketili Line	1966	19.6 km (12.2 mi)	16
2	Saburtalo Line	1979	7.7 km (4.8 mi)	7
Total:			27.3 km (17.0 mi)	23

=== Timeline ===
Segment	Date opened	Length
Didube–Rustaveli	11 January 1966	6.3 km
Rustaveli–300 Aragveli	6 November 1967	3.5 km
300 Aragveli–Samgori	5 May 1971	2.4 km
Sadguris Moedani–Delisi	15 September 1979	5.5 km
Samgori–Varketili	8 November 1985	1.7 km
Didube–Guramishvili	16 November 1985	3.4 km
Guramishvili–Akhmetelis Teatri	7 January 1989	2.3 km
Delisi–Vazha-Pshavela	2 April 2000	1.2 km
Vazha-Pshavela–Sakhelmtsipo Universiteti	16 October 2017	1.0 km
Total:	23 stations	27.3 km

== Operation ==
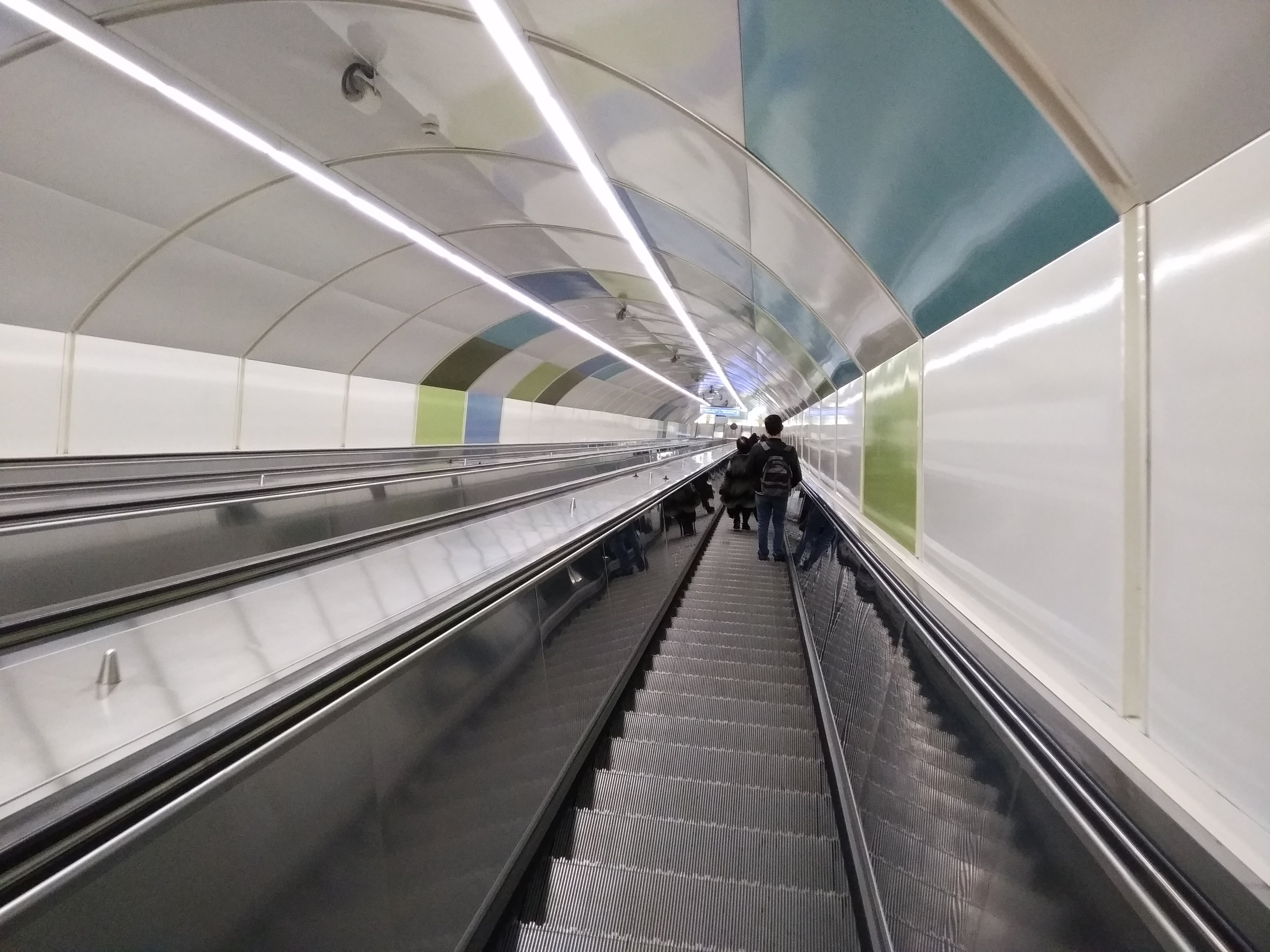
Since most stations are deeply built, almost every station has a long escalator

As of 2018, the system consists of two lines, serving 23 stations, operating on 27.3 kilometres (17.0 mi) of the route and 62.5 kilometres (38.8 mi) of track. Of the 23 stations, 21 stations are below ground and two are surface level. Of the subterranean stations, 17 are deep level and 4 are shallows. The former comprises 6 pylon stations, 5 columns and 6 single vaults (built to the Leningrad Technology). The shallow stations consist of three pillar trepans and one single vault (Kharkiv Technology). Due to Tbilisi's uneven landscape, the Metro, particularly the Akhmeteli-Varketili line, has one surface-level section.

An estimated total of 105.6 million people used the Metro annually as of 2005, though the actual figure by 2012 was closer to 94 million. Carrying them are a fleet of 170 Soviet-built rail cars, consisting of the 81–717/714 and Еzh3 models, which have been modernised since 2000 (using the Czech blueprint of the 81-71M) and operate from two depots. Station platforms are approximately 102 meters in length, and built to accommodate five-carriage trains, though four-car trains operate on both lines of the subway system.

Trains run from a little before 6:00 am (exact times vary depending on the station) until midnight, with intervals ranging between 2 1/2 minutes at peak times and 12 minutes later in the night. Train speeds are 60–80 kilometres per hour (37–50 mph), while the average trip speed is slightly over 33 kilometres per hour (21 mph).

As of 2018, due to the State University (Tbilisi Metro) extension, a new digital signaling system was installed by Siemens, controlling 2.6 km (1.6 mi) of track and three interlockings, from Delisi to State University (Tbilisi Metro), which is the only segment in the network containing signaling systems from the post-Soviet era.

== Fares ==
The Tbilisi Metro uses a flat-fare system of 1 lari per journey. Tokens are no longer used, and riders must purchase for 2 lari a Metromoney Card (a stored value card available at metro stations), onto which they can add fares. The card allows riders to re-enter the system within 90 minutes of leaving it at no charge.

== Future ==
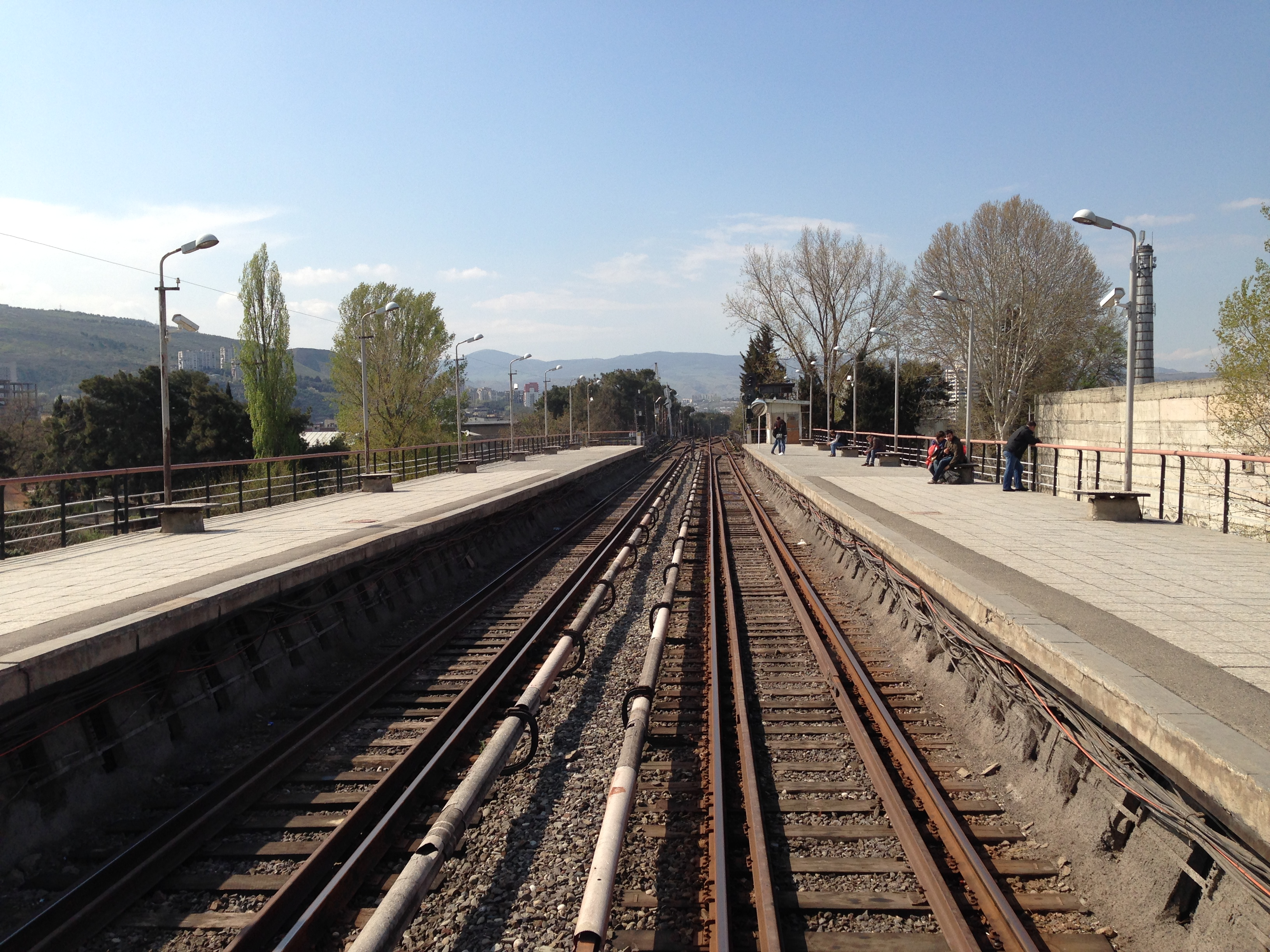
Gotsiridze platforms before reconstruction

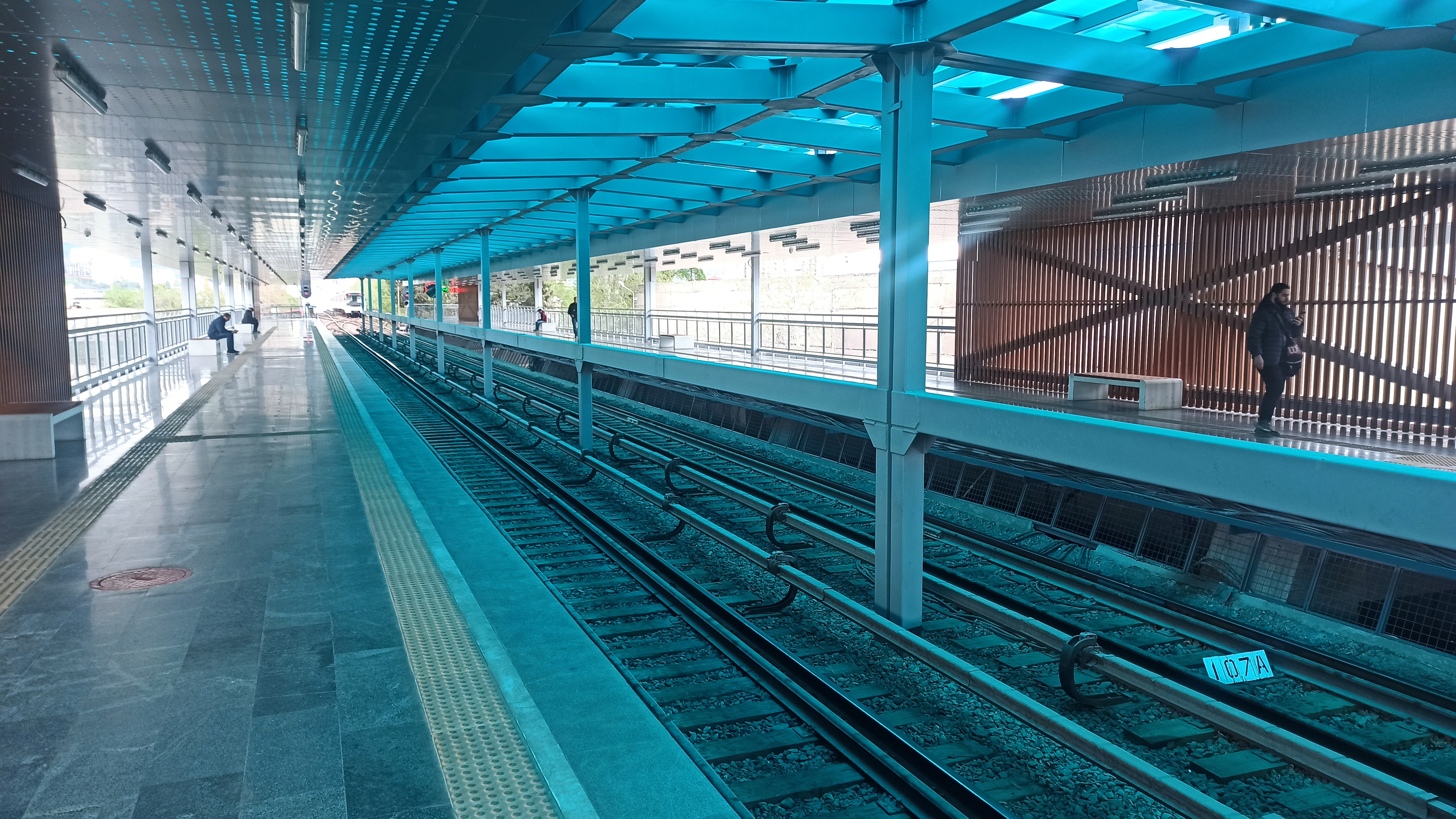
Gotsiridze platforms after reconstruction

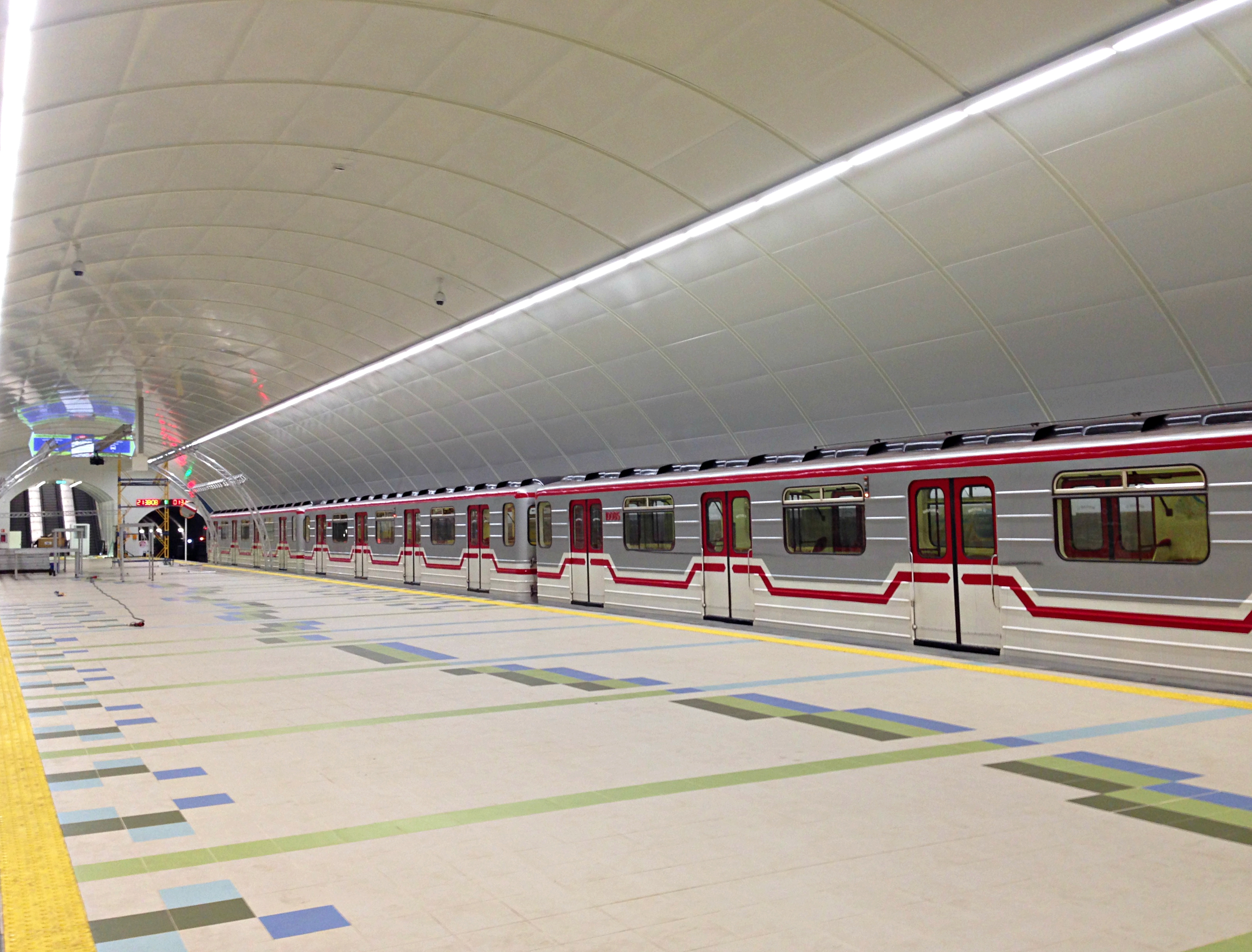
State University platform

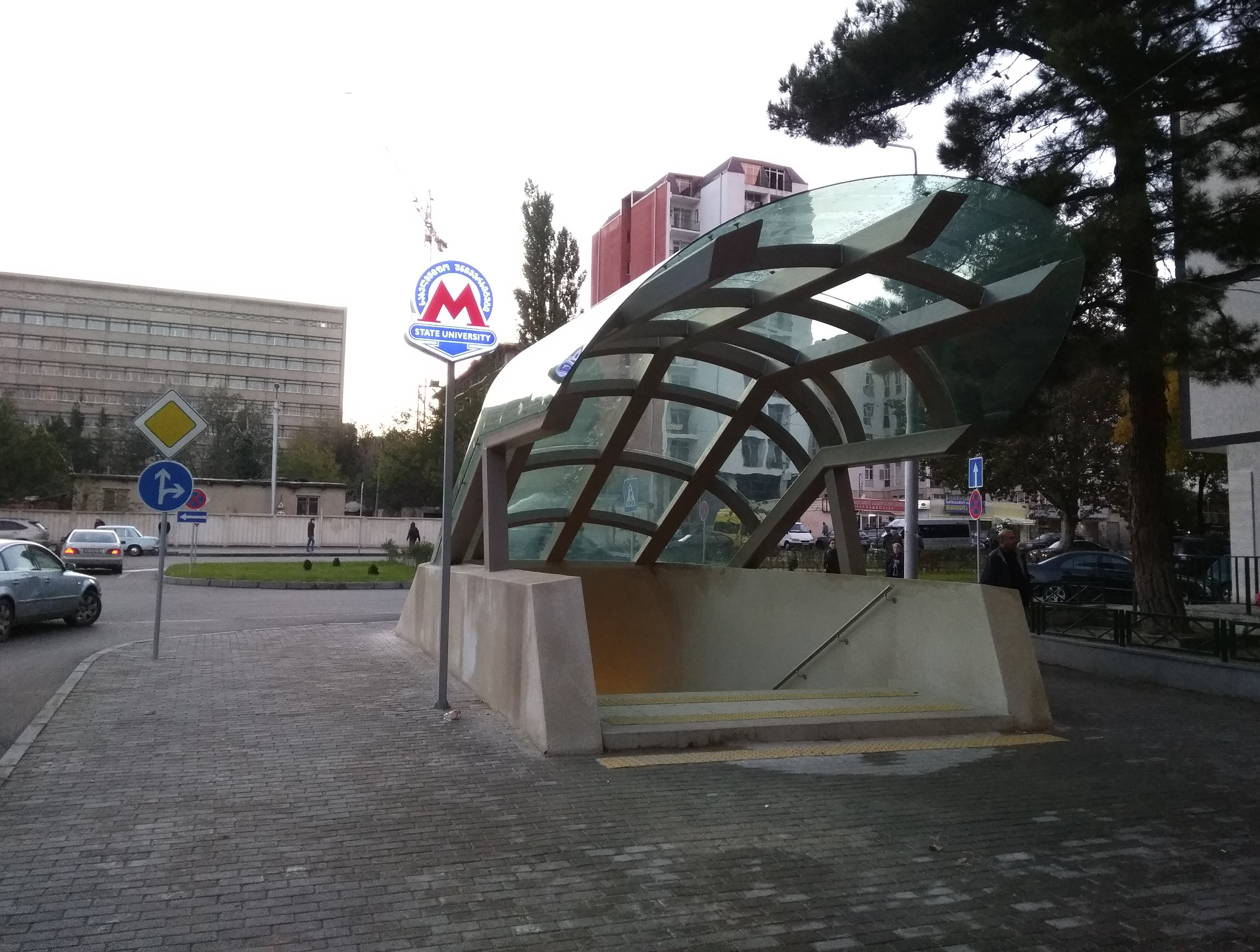
State University exit

The system also had an advanced extension plan, with a third line, amongst other locations, encompassing the district of Vake. Forming a typical Soviet triangle with a three-line six radii layout intersecting in the city centre. However, most of the construction sites remain frozen, some dating to Soviet times.

There were also in the past plans to return to a tram network in Tbilisi. However, today this is no longer discussed by any political party.

In October 2018, then-Prime Minister of Georgia, Mamuka Bakhtadze announced during the Georgian Dream conference that 7 new stations will form a new line connecting central Tbilisi with the southeastern outskirts of the city and Tbilisi Shota Rustaveli Airport. According to the plan, the new overground line will run from Samgori metro station to the Lilo market in the east of the city, and was planned to be opened in 2020. As of present day, the project has not been started. The new metro line was planned to use Light Rail Vehicles running at 10 minute intervals for both directions. The mayor Kakha Kaladze added, that the line is planned to be extended to Rustavi, a major city 30 km (19 mi) away from the capital. Although, this remains a plan until the overground line is open. Today, this plan is no longer ever brought up by the ruling party.

== Metro reform plan ==
In October 2022, EBRD worked with the Tbilisi Mayor's Office to start and fund a project to renovate the above ground infrastructure of 11 Metro stations, adapting them to be wheelchair accessible. Along with this plan, 4 Metro stations are to have new entrances constructed. Over 50 million euros were approved for this project. A tender for the project was announced in July 2023. The winning tender, approved by city hall officials, will commence works in multiple different areas, from internal station infrastructure such as electricity systems and fire-repellant system, to improvements in the passenger experience, in the form of accessibility. 3 escalators at Station Square (Tbilisi Metro) will be completely replaced, along with 36 other escalators that will be modernized to save energy. Along with all the other plans in the metro reform project, the expected date of completion is 2029.

== See also ==
- List of Tbilisi Metro stations
- List of metro systems
- Trams in Tbilisi
