= Station Square (Tbilisi Metro) =

Tbilisi Metro station

Station Square სადგურის მოედანი
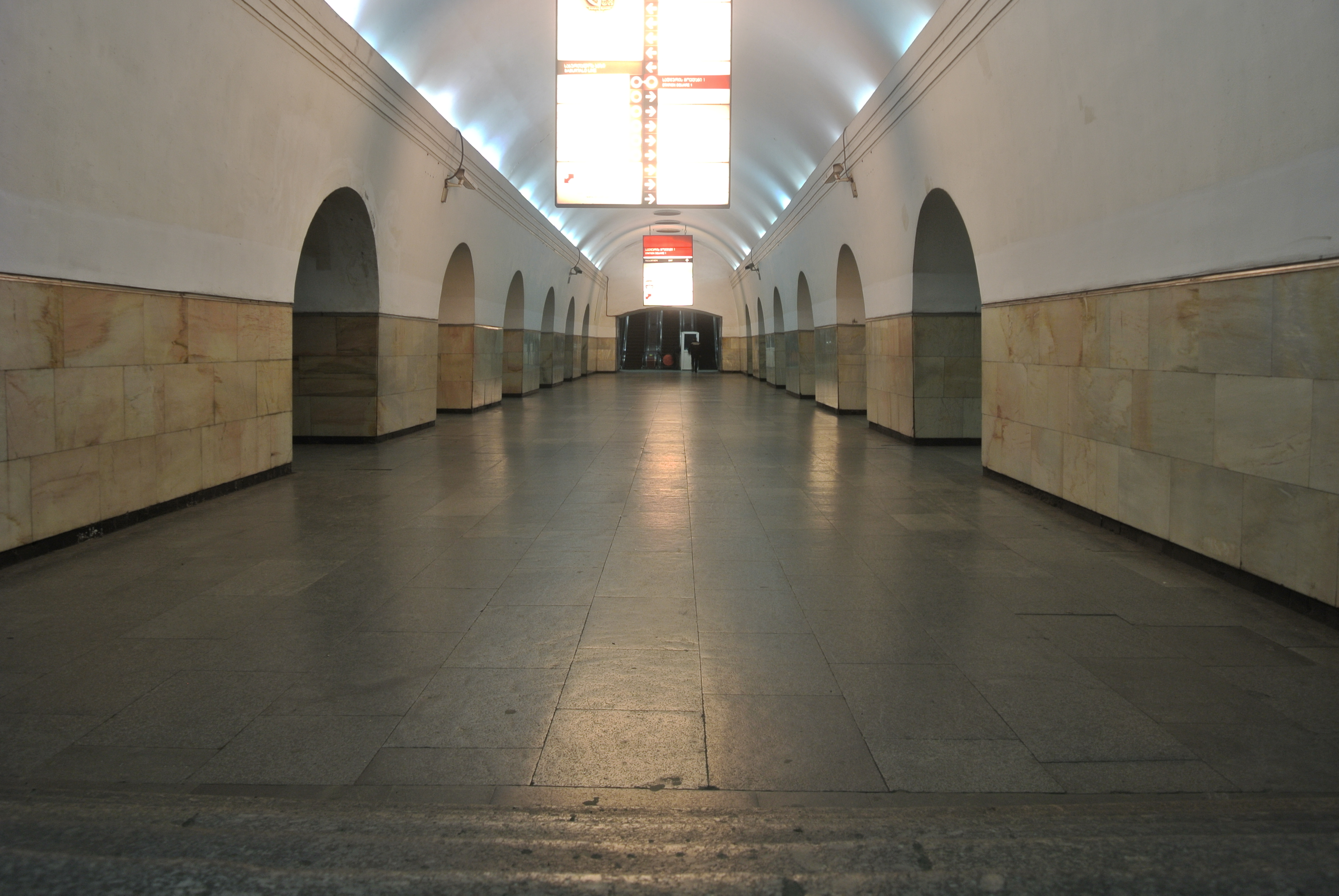

General information
- Coordinates: 41.722627°N 44.797493°E
- System: Tbilisi Metro station
- Line: Akhmeteli–Varketili Line Saburtalo Line
- Tracks: 4 (2 per line)

Construction
- Structure type: Underground

History
- Opened: 11 January 1966; 60 years ago (Line 1); 15 April 1979; 47 years ago (Line 2)

Services
Preceding station	Tbilisi Metro	Following station
Nadzaladevi towards Akhmetelis Teatri	Akhmeteli–Varketili Line	Marjanishvili towards Varketili
Tsereteli towards State University	Saburtalo Line	Terminus
Location

Station Square (Georgian: სადგურის მოედანი, romanized: sadguris moedani) is an interchange station on the Tbilisi Metro. It opened on 11 January 1966 and was one of the initial stations in the system. On 15 April 1979, the station began serving the Saburtalo Line. It was known as Vagzlis Moedani (Georgian: ვაგზლის მოედანი) until 2011. Vagzlis comes from the Russian word for station, "Vokzal", since it is located below the Tbilisi railway station.

The station is located between Nadzaladevi and Marjanishvili. Construction works were carried out by "Tbilmetromshen".

The upper floor is built into the administrative building of the Metropolitan (architects E. Kvernadze, G. Melkadze). The space of the lower station is divided into three parts by an arch supported by marble-clad pylons. Granite tiles are laid on the floor (architect V. Abramishvili). The authors of the carved panels are the sculptors F. Mzareulashvili and I. Ochiauri. Above the arch opening from the escalator to the waiting hall is a high-relief image of a sword and cup dedicated to the 1500th anniversary of Tbilisi.
