= List of railway stations in Armenia =

Railway stations in Armenia include:

== Maps ==
- UN Map
- UNHCR Atlas Map

== Stations ==
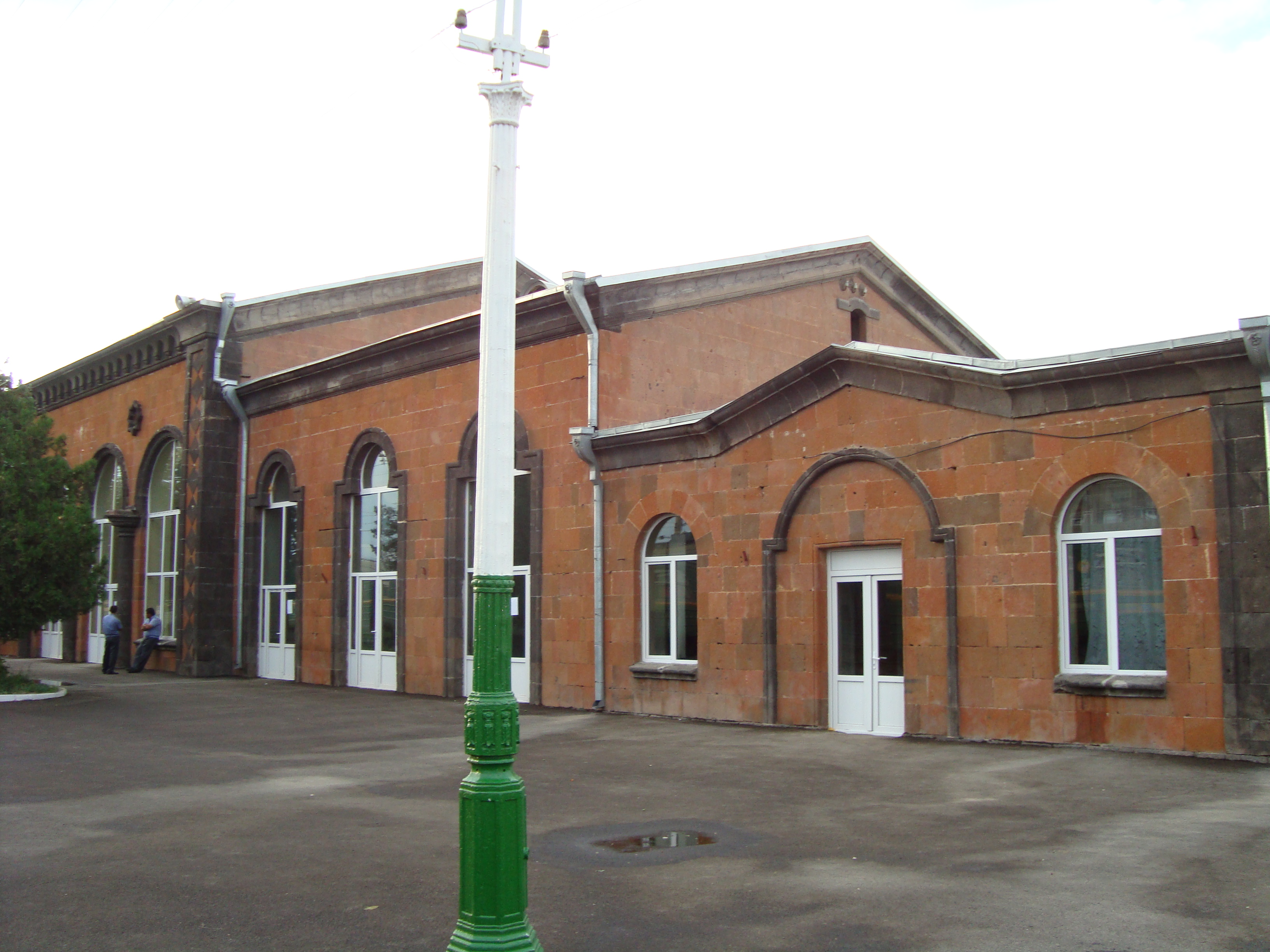
Armavir railway station

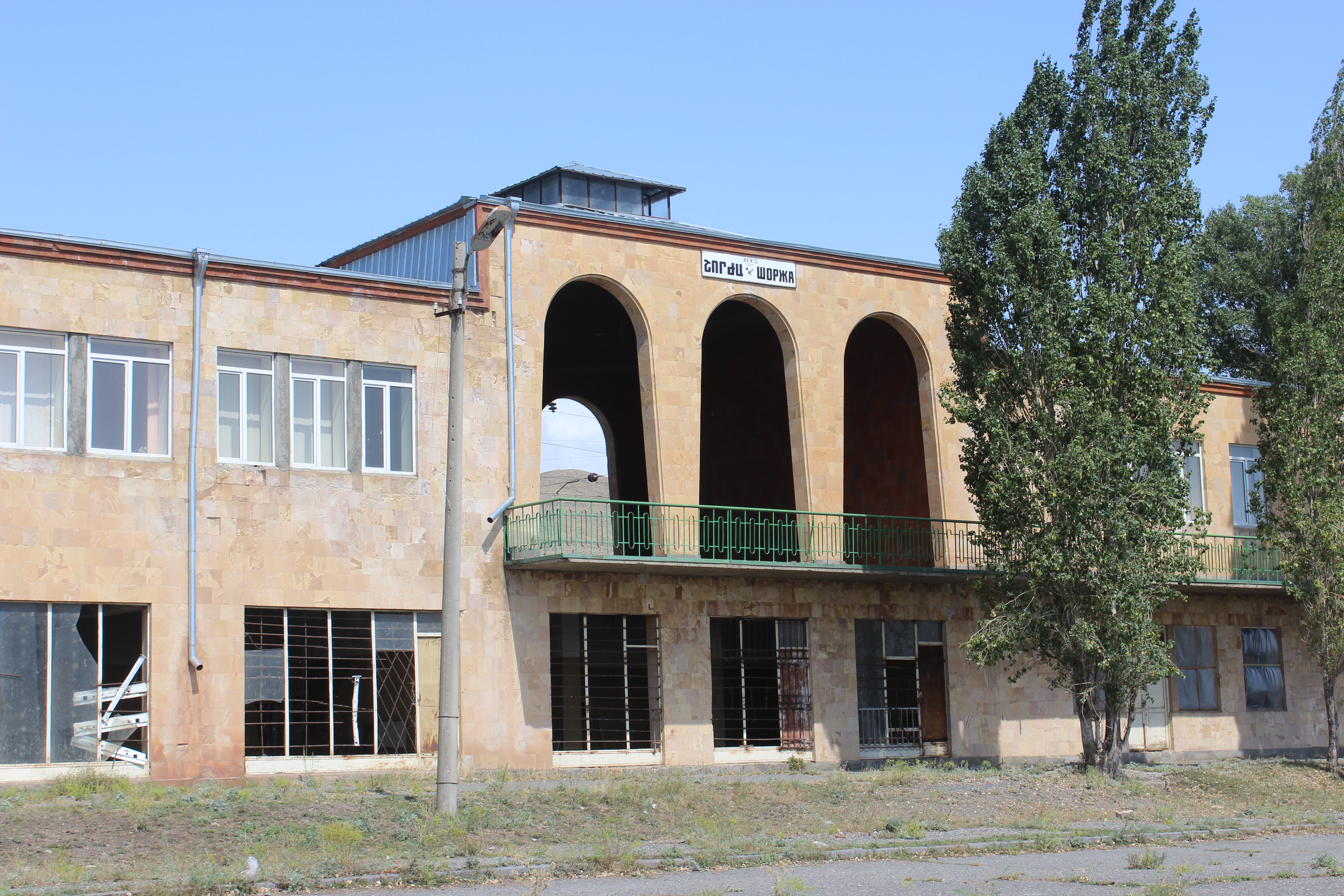
Shorzha railway station, currently used summertimes only

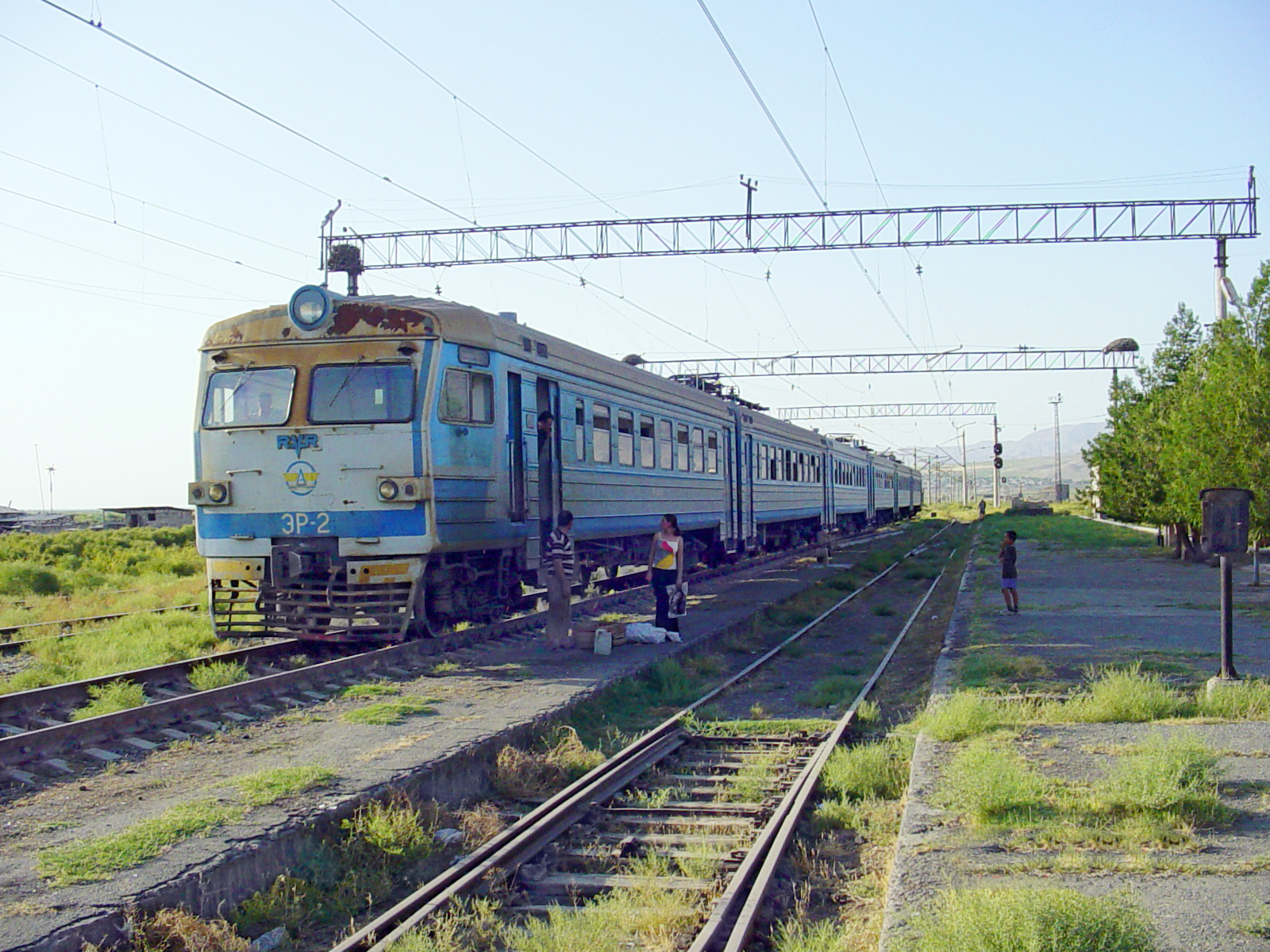
A train stopped at Yeraskh

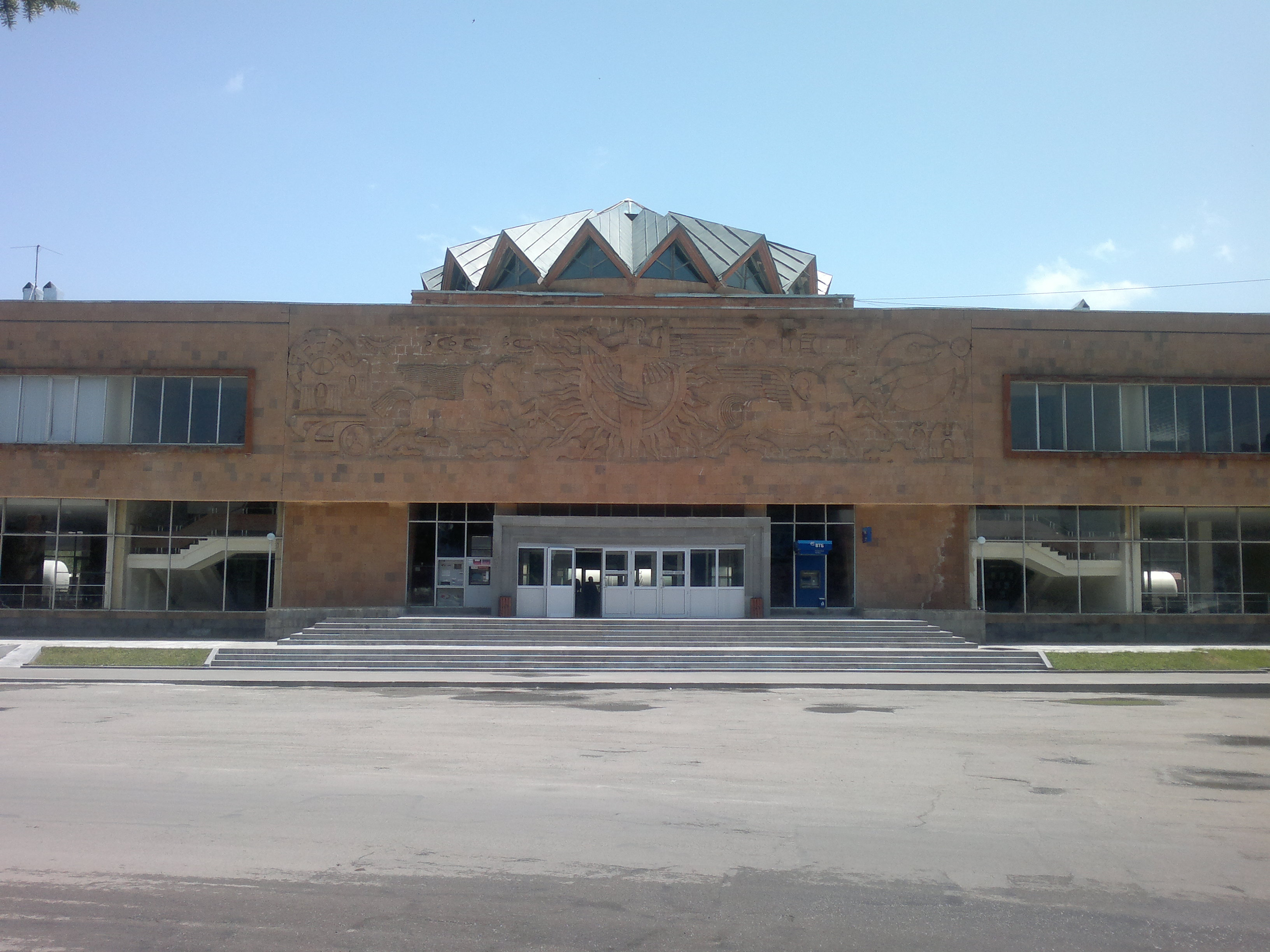
Gyumri railway station

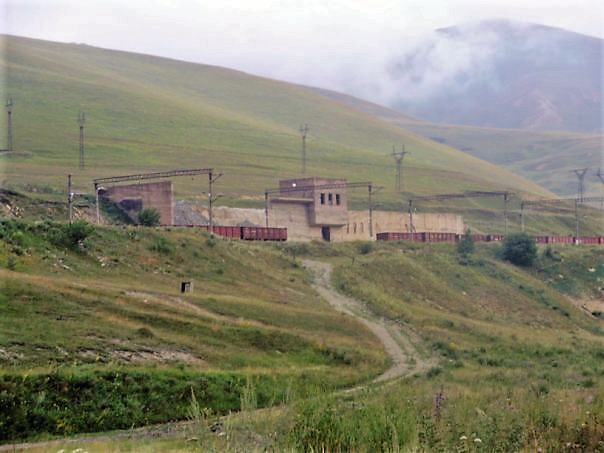
Sotk railway station, currently used by freight trains only

Existing
s.	Name Transliteration	Remarks	Location
-	Երևան Սասունցի Դավիթ; Yerevan Sasounci David	Interchange with Sasounci David metro station	Sasounci David Square; 40.155395°N 44.508539°E
1	Նորագավիթ; Noragavit		40.113106°N 44.464033°E
2	Մասիս; Masis	Junction for the Yerevan branch line	40.062023°N 44.410674°E
1	Արտաշատ; Artashat		39.961861°N 44.553998°E
0	Այգավան; Aygavan		Vosketap; 39.886838°N 44.653921°E
-1	Արարատ; Ararat Halt		Spandaryan St. 39.853285°N 44.689802°E
-2	Արարատ; Ararat Station		39.840569°N 44.705129°E
3	Սիս; Sis		40.063270°N 44.389138°E
4	Հայկաշեն; Haykashen		40.068169°N 44.308937°E
5	Էջﬕածին; Echmiatsin	actually in the village of Jrarat, Armavir	40.069067°N 44.266041°E
6	Արտաշար; Artashar		40.107086°N 44.178982°E
7	Սովետական; Sovetakan	now known as Alashkert	40.115395°N 44.152834°E
8	Մրգաշատ; Mrgashat		40.131877°N 44.082710°E
9	Արմավիր; Armavir		40.146011°N 44.032054°E
10	Արաքս; Araks	in the village of Myasnikyan	40.183930°N 43.918587°E
-7	Հրազդան; Hrazdan		Kentron; 40.515946°N 44.757097°E
-6	Սոլակ; Solak		40.460961°N 44.707699°E
-5	Չարենցավան; Charentsavan		40.402552°N 44.647653°E
-4	Նուռնուս; Nurnus		40.342925°N 44.606299°E
-3	Աբովյան; Abovyan		Yerevanyan St. 40.269801°N 44.617008°E
-2	Քանաքեռ; Kanaker		40.229713°N 44.552920°E
-1	Երևան Ալմաստ; Yerevan Almast	in northeastern Yerevan; the terminal used by the line to Sevan.	40.205080°N 44.550516°E
-8	Դդմաշեն; Ddmashen		40.565566°N 44.825132°E
-9	Ծաղկունք; Tsaghkunk		40.542016°N 44.871222°E
-10	Վարսեր; Varser		40.551302°N 44.913917°E
-11	Սևան; Sevan		40.551177°N 44.956753°E
-12	Սևան Թերակղզի; Sevan Terakghzi	Sevan Island	40.551177°N 44.956753°E
-13	Ծովագյուղ; Tsovagyugh		40.626660°N 44.971318°E
-14	Դրախտիկ; Drakhtik		40.547544°N 45.209723°E
-15	Շորժա; Shorzha		40.499310°N 45.270150°E
-3	Զոդ; Zod	station serving southeastern Ararat village	39.828535°N 44.720352°E
-4	Արմաշ; Armash		39.760717°N 44.806781°E
-5	Երասխ; Yeraskh	Nakhchivan exclave border station	39.740356°N 44.825951°E
11	Դալարիկ; Dalarik		40.230354°N 43.876779°E
12	Քարակերտ; Karakert		40.248652°N 43.822161°E
13	Արտենի; Arteni		40.300322°N 43.768323°E
14	Արագած; Aragats	station serving Aragatsavan	40.324704°N 43.665417°E
15	Անի; Ani	station serving Aniavan	40.465226°N 43.643379°E
16	Աղին; Aghin		
17	Բայանդուր; Bayandur		40.693901°N 43.772274°E
18	Գյումրի; Gyumri	is the oldest railway station in Armenia	40.787608°N 43.859830°E

=== Proposed ===
- Ashtarak
- Gyumri

== See also ==
- Armenian Railways
- Rail transport in Europe
- Russian gauge
- South Caucasus Railway
- Transport in Armenia
