= Armenian Railways =

National railway company of Armenia

Armenian Railways Armenian: Հայկական երկաթուղի Russian: Армянская железная дорога
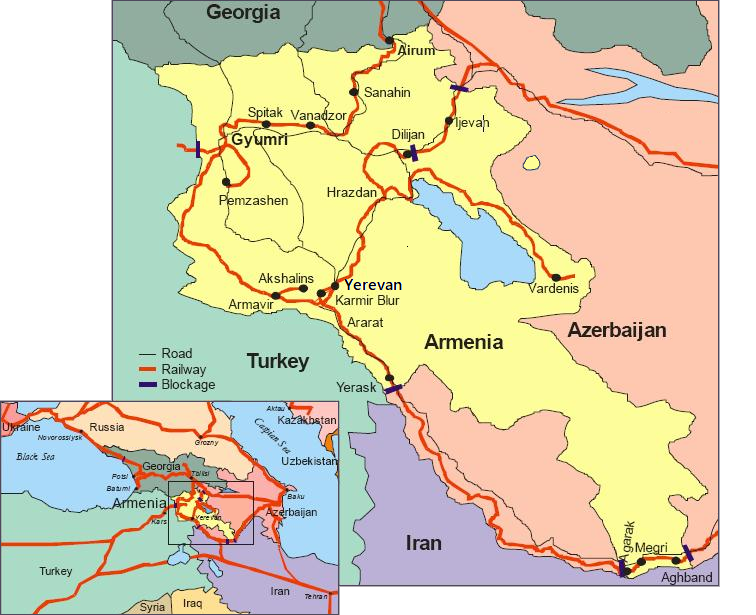
- Armenia's railway network.

Overview
- Headquarters: Yerevan
- Reporting mark: HYU
- Locale: Armenia
- Dates of operation: 1992–2008
- Predecessor: Armenian Railways (Soviet Railways)
- Successor: South Caucasus Railway (Russian Railways)

Technical
- Track gauge: 1,520 mm (4 ft 11 27/32 in)
- Electrification: 3 kV DC
- Length: 845 km (525 mi)

Armenian Railways (Armenian: Հայկական երկաթուղի) was a rail operator in Armenia.

== Main information ==
The 845 km (525 mi), 1,520 mm (4 ft 11 27/32 in) gauge network is electrified at 3 kV DC. Now the railways in Armenia are operated by South Caucasus Railway of Russian Railways.

The railway operating environment in Armenia sharply deteriorated following the collapse of the Soviet Union. According to the World Bank, Armenian Railways was in dramatic need of major investment, including the replacement of rolling stock, rehabilitation of the main line between Yerevan and the Georgian border, renewal of electrification, and bridge reconstruction. Rail transport was slow and unreliable, and traffic remained low compared to European countries with similar sized networks, amounting to only 2.6 million tons of freight and 0.85 million passengers in 2004.

At present the only preexisting rail connection between Armenia and Iran is the line which passes through the autonomous region of Nakhchivan, an exclave of Azerbaijan. However, because the border between the two countries is closed, the line from Yerevan is operational only as far as Yeraskh.

== Armenian Railways Concession to Russian Railways ==
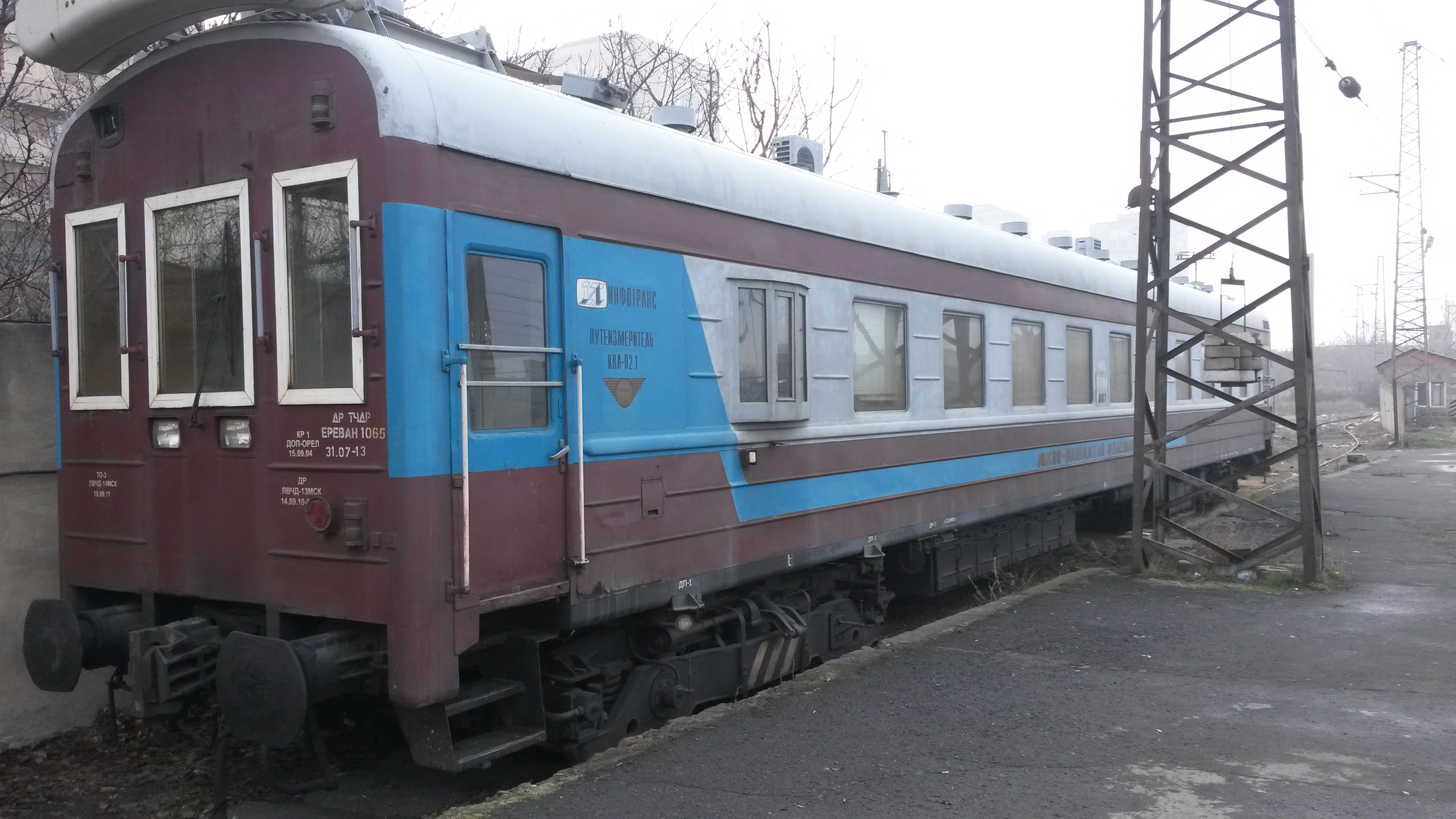
Railway coach of the South Caucasus Railway at Yerevan railway station

In 2007, the government of Armenia conducted a tender process for the modernization and operation of Armenian Railways, with the intention of awarding a concession in 2008. RITES and Russian Railways qualified to bid but RITES, an Indian Railways company, later withdrew. Russian Railways was the only bidder and established South Caucasus Railway CJSC as a wholly owned subsidiary to run the former Armenian Railways. On 1 June 2008, South Caucasus Railway officially commenced its modernization and operation program and, as part of the concession agreement, received assets owned by Armenian Railways consisting of 2,000 freight cars, 58 passenger coaches, 85 locomotives and 30 electric trains. All 4,300 personnel formerly employed by Armenian Railways retained their jobs. The concession agreement was concluded for 30 years, with a right of extension for another 20 years after the first 20 years of operation.

== Armenia-Iran Railway Concession to Rasia FZE (Southern Armenia Railway or North-South Railway Corridor) ==
On July 28, 2012, a concession agreement was awarded to Dubai-based Rasia FZE (a Rasia Group investment company) for the feasibility, design, financing, construction and operation of a new railway link between Armenia and Iran having an operating period of 30 years, with a right of extension for another 20 years. The Armenia-Iran railway is called the Southern Armenia Railway project, which forms the key missing link in the International North-South Transport Corridor between the Black Sea and the Persian Gulf. Prior to the feasibility study being completed, the Southern Armenia Railway was anticipated to be a 316 km railway linking Gavar, 50 km east of Yerevan near Lake Sevan, with the Iranian border near Meghri.

On 24 January 2013, during an announcement and press conference, the Chairman of Rasia Group, Joseph K. Borkowski, announced the previously signed Southern Armenia Railway concession agreement as well as the concession agreement for the southern section of the North-South Road Corridor. A separate tripartite memorandum of understanding was signed in Yerevan by Rasia FZE, Russian Railways (RZD) subsidiary South Caucasus Railway, and the government of the Republic of Armenia concerning technical cooperation, investment, and the future operation of the Southern Armenia Railway. Rasia FZE announced its appointment of China Communications Construction Company as the "lead member of the development consortium" for the project and the commencement of the feasibility study.

Following a meeting on 3 September 2013 with Serzh Sargsyan, the President of Armenia, President Vladimir Putin of the Russian Federation stated that Russian Railways can invest about RUB 15 billion in the development of the Armenian Railway.

In mid-September 2013, Rasia FZE announced in a meeting with Armenian Prime Minister Tigran Sargsyan the achievement of a key milestone for the Southern Armenia Railway, including the release of a highly favorable feasibility study and the recommended railway design route from China Communications Construction Company. Having reached this key milestone, Rasia FZE moved to secure essential regional cooperation for the financing, construction and operation stages of the project. The feasibility study results indicated that the Southern Armenia Railway would cost approximately US$3.5 billion to construct, have a length of 305 kilometers from Gagarin to Agarak, and provide a base operating capacity of 25 million tons per annum. The railway will have 84 bridges spanning 19.6 kilometers and 60 tunnels of 102.3 kilometers, comprising 40% of the total project length.

As the key missing link in the International North-South Transport Corridor, the Southern Armenia Railway would create the shortest transportation route from the ports of the Black Sea to the ports of the Persian Gulf. The Southern Armenia Railway would establish a major commodities transit corridor between Europe and the Persian Gulf region, based on traffic volume forecasts of 18.3 million tons per annum. At completion of railway construction and commencement of operations, transport costs and times for the region are expected to improve substantially, fostering greater regional trade and economic growth with extraordinary direct benefits for the Armenian economy including an alleviation of the economic pressures caused by the illegal border blockade against Armenia by Turkey and Azerbaijan.

On 24 October 2013, the Armenia-Iran railway was brought up for public discussion for the first time by the Armenian National Security Council on grounds of regional security and it was recently declared a priority project. Arthur Baghdasaryan, Secretary of the Armenian National Security Council, added that the project for the construction of the railway to Iran, as well as the reopening of the railway to Abkhazia represent strategic elements of the Armenian Security Plan 2014–2017.

== South Caucasus Railway ==
South Caucasus Railway elaborated on the work already completed in Armenia in support of a North-South Transport Corridor including, during the period between 2008 and 2012, an investment program exceeding US$225 million, which was allocated by Russian Railways. During this time, as a part of the infrastructure modernization program, more than 300 km of track, 160 technological objects, 33 artificial structures, 130 km of contact network, and 140 km of power lines were repaired. In 2012, three major railway bridges that were built in 1898 were commissioned including the Zamanlinsky bridge, the Satanikamurj bridge, and the bridge on the Kober-Tumanian span. Infrastructure improvements over the past four years have now allowed for the increase of substantial traffic volumes. Expansion of the railway network of Armenia and increased mining activity in Armenia are creating new jobs, economic growth, and increases in traffic volume.

During the calendar year 2013, South Caucasus Railway transported 3.2752 million tons of cargo and 415.4 thousand passengers. The cargo volumes comprised 0.456 million tons of exports, 1.2607 million tons of imports, and 1.5585 million tons of local traffic. This cargo comprised 1.3 million tons of non-ferrous ore, 0.455 million tons of grain, 0.2768 million tons of oil loads, 0.1335 million tons of building materials, and 0.1102 million tons of cement.

According to preliminary data from Russian Railways, freight traffic at South Caucasus Railway is expected to increase to up to 30 million tons per annum. The company plans to promote cooperation with Georgia, Azerbaijan, Turkey, Ukraine and other countries.

== International links ==
- Azerbaijan – closed – same gauge
- (Georgia (country)) Georgia – open – same gauge
- Iran – via Azerbaijan's Nakhchivan enclave – closed – break of gauge – 1,520 mm (4 ft 11 27/32 in)/1,435 mm (4 ft 8 1/2 in)
- Turkey -Akhuryan/Doğukapı, closed since 1993 – break of gauge -1,520 mm (4 ft 11 27/32 in)/1,435 mm (4 ft 8 1/2 in)

As of 2008, all international railway links between Armenia and its neighbors, except the ones with Georgia, have been closed since 1993 due to the blockade against the country by Turkey and Azerbaijan due to conflict in Nagorno Karabagh.

== Timeline ==
=== 1899 ===
- Kars–Gyumri–Tbilisi railway opens.

=== 1902 ===
- Branch from Gyumri to Yerevan opens.

=== 1993 ===
- The border with Turkey closes, cutting the Kars–Gyumri link.

=== 2008 ===
- Russian Railways wins tender to manage Armenian Railways on concessionary basis for 30 years, extendable for another 20 years.

=== 2012 ===
- Dubai-based investment company Rasia FZE (Rasia Group) awarded 30-year concession for constructing and operating the Southern Armenia Railway (also known as the Armenia-Iran Railway and the missing link in the North-South Transport Corridor) between the operating railway networks of the Republic of Armenia and the Islamic Republic of Iran.

=== 2013 ===
- The Government of Armenia, Russian Railways, and Rasia FZE sign trilateral memorandum of understanding on cooperation related to the Southern Armenia Railway.
- Rasia FZE announces that the $US 3.5 billion Southern Armenia Railway project is feasible and it will proceed with financing and construction together with the lead member of its consortium China Communications Construction Company (CCCC) for the railway construction and its planned railway operating partner Russian Railways.

== Routes ==
South Caucasus Railway currently operates the following services:

- Yerevan to Tbilisi to Batumi
- Yerevan to Araks / Gyumri
- Yerevan to Ararat / Yeraskh
- Yerevan to Shorja

== Stations ==
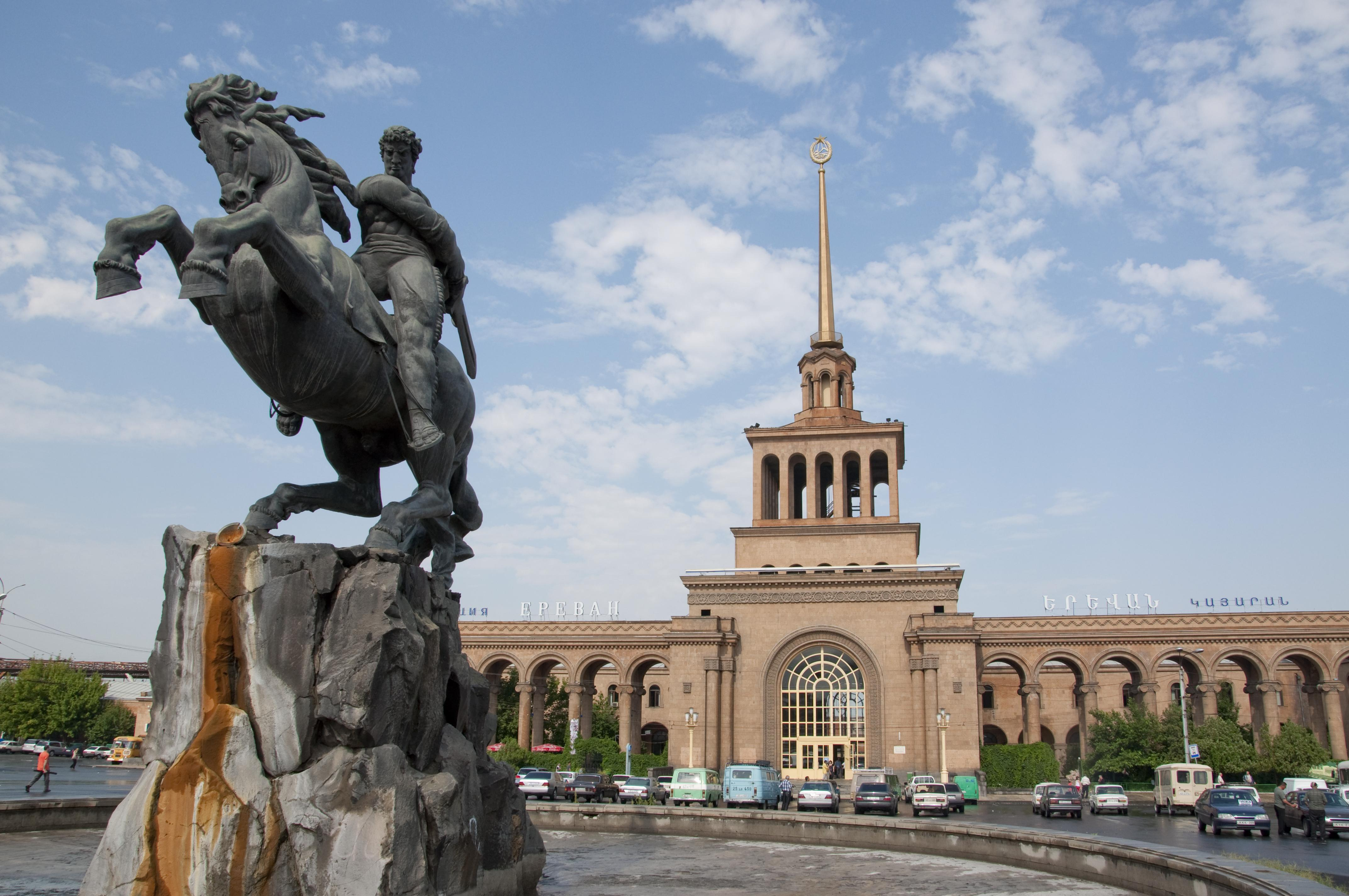
Yerevan Railway Station

== Rolling Stock ==
Due to a lack of investment, Soviet-made rolling stock is still in use. This includes elektrichka type electric multiple units for suburban services.

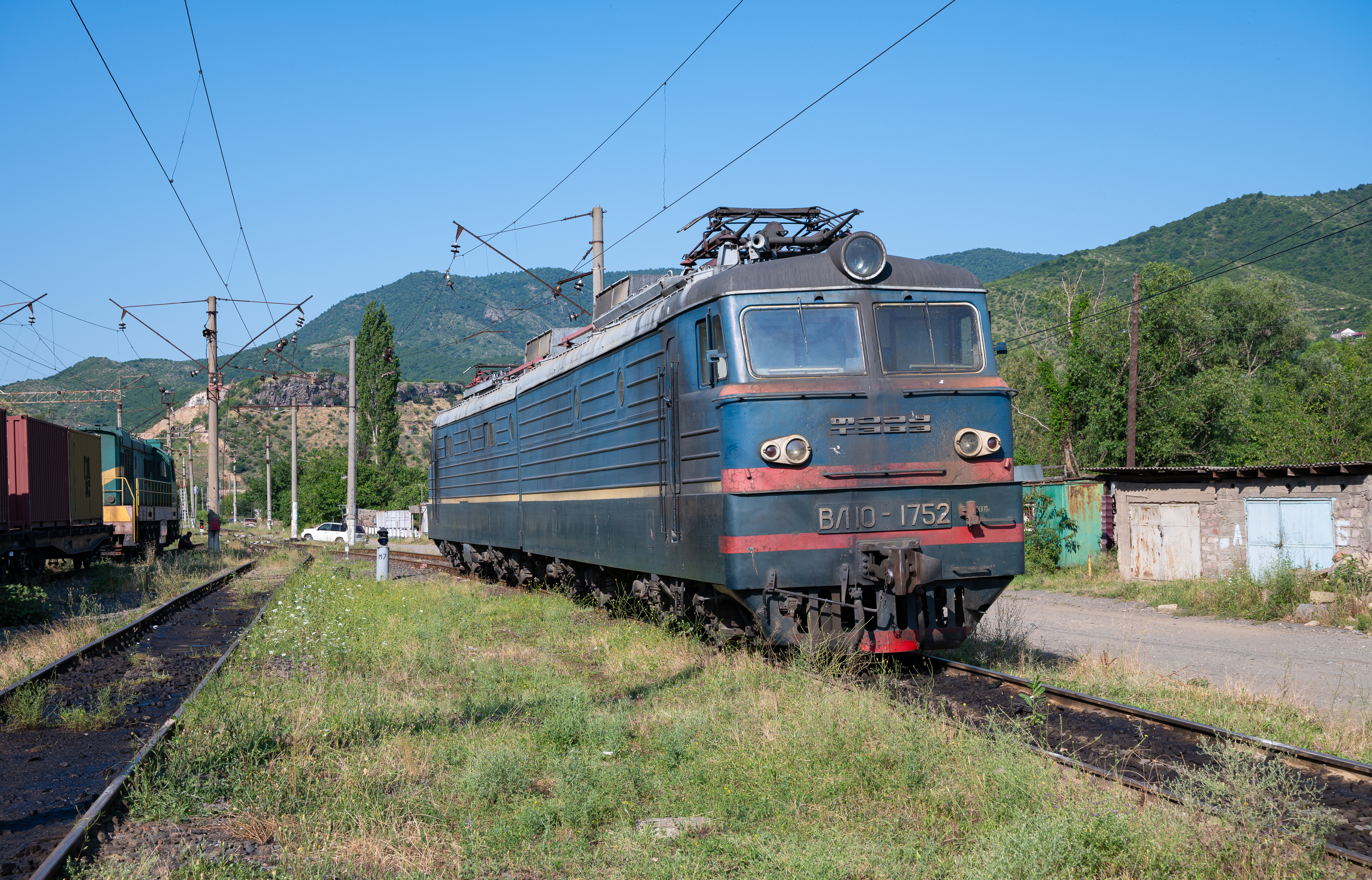
VL10-1752 at the border station of Ayrum, Armenia

== See also ==
- Armenia
- Transcaucasus Railway
- Transport in Armenia
- North-South Transport Corridor
