= Yerevan railway station =

Railway station in Yerevan, Armenia

Coordinates: 40.1553°N 44.5081°E

Yerevan Երևան
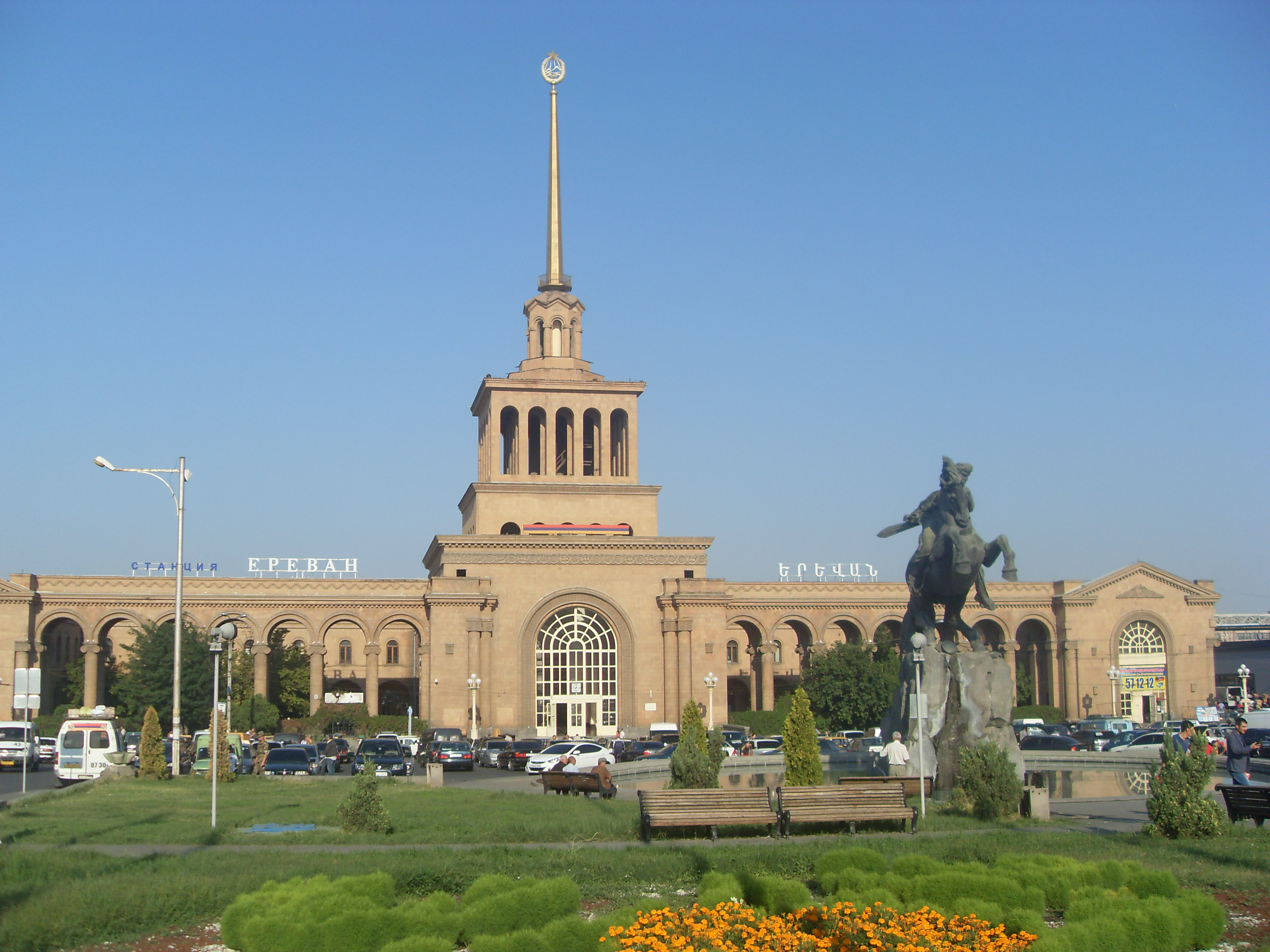

General information
- Location: Yerevan; Armenia
- System: South Caucasus Railway terminal
- Owner: Russian Railways
- Operator: South Caucasus Railway
- Platforms: 2
- Tracks: 5
- Connections: 1 David of Sasun station

Construction
- Structure type: At-grade
- Parking: Yes

Other information
- Station code: 567804
- Fare zone: 16

History
- Opened: 1902
- Former names: Erivan (1902–1936)

Services
Preceding station	South Caucasus Railway	Following station
Noragavit towards Gyumri	Yerevan–Batumi	Terminus
Location
- Location within Armenia

Yerevan railway station (Armenian: Երևան երկաթուղային կայարան, romanized: Yerevan yerkat’ughayin kayaran or simply Կայարան, Kayaran) is the central station of Yerevan, the capital of Armenia, located south of downtown Yerevan, approximately 2.8 km from Republic Square.

It is connected to the adjacent David of Sasun metro station by a pedestrian tunnel.

== History ==
In 1902, the first railway line was built to Yerevan, connecting it with Alexandropol (Gyumri) and Tiflis (Tbilisi). In 1908, a second line connected it with Julfa, Persia.

The station building was built in 1956. The Museum of railway transport of Armenia was opened in the station on 31 July 2009. A preserved steam locomotive, number 3ա705-46, stands in the station.

In 2010, Russian Railways rebuilt the station complex. During the renovations, they restored the interior of the station, introducing LCD screens with train schedule information for passengers. In addition, due to the significant increase in passenger traffic, as well as the need to ensure a comfortable environment when buying tickets, it was decided to divide the space into rooms for long-distance and international trains. In the station building, there is a hotel with rooms for accommodation.

== Trips ==
- Yerevan — Batumi (from June to September)
- Yerevan — Tbilisi (from December to March)
- Yerevan — Gyumri
- Yerevan — Ararat
- Yerevan — Araks
- Yerevan — Yeraskh

== Photos ==
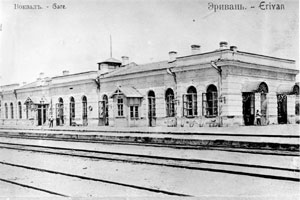

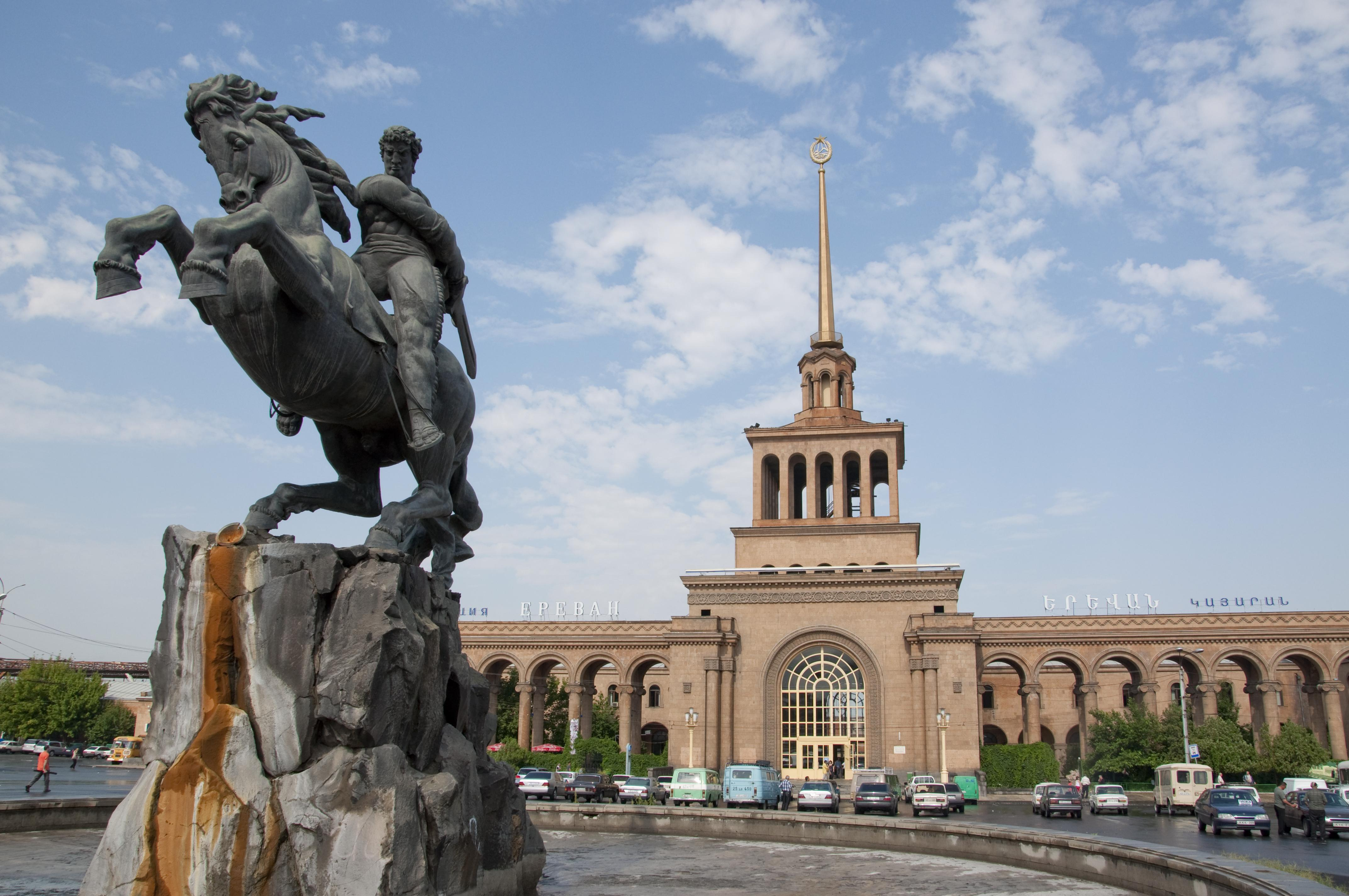

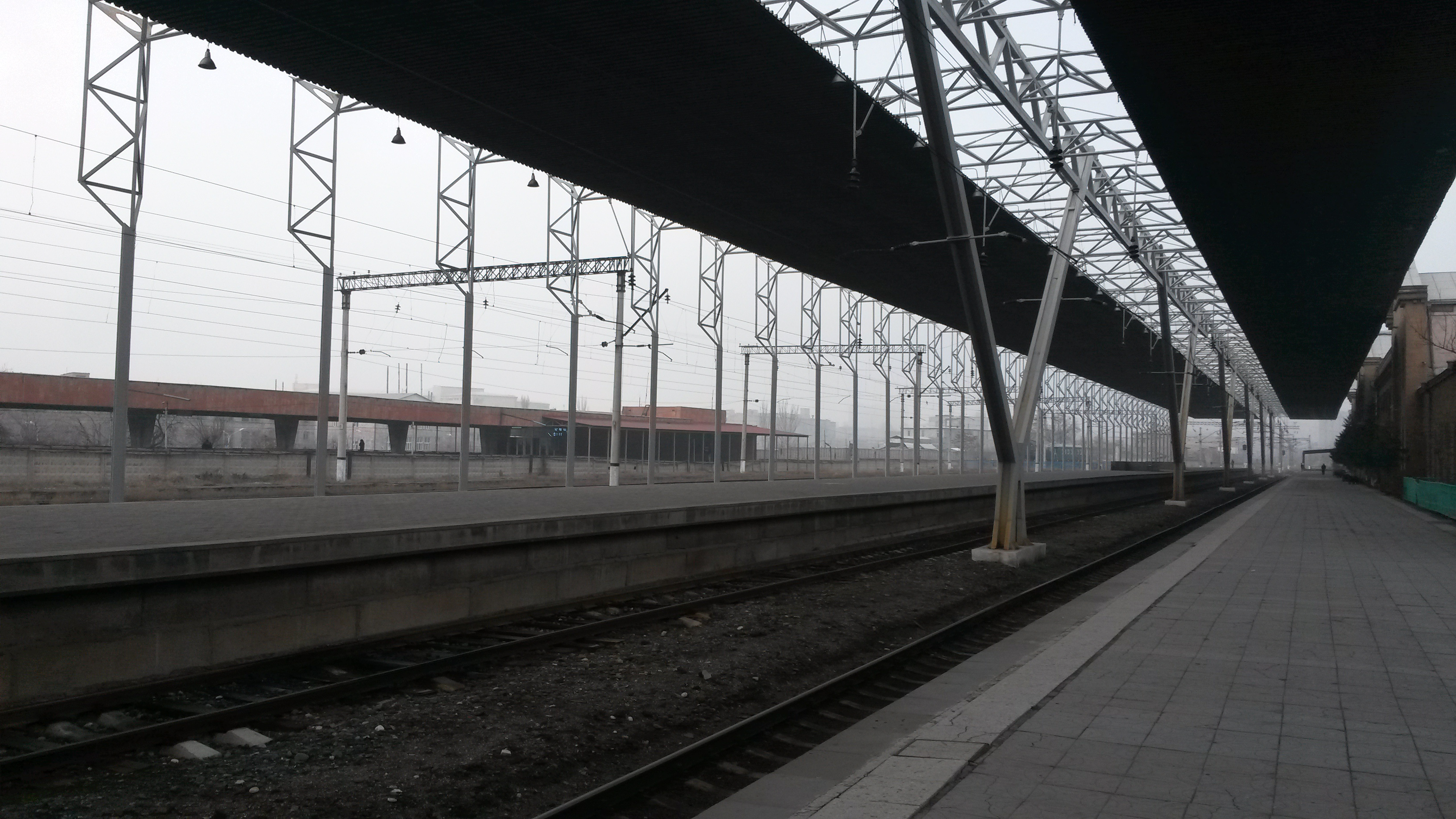

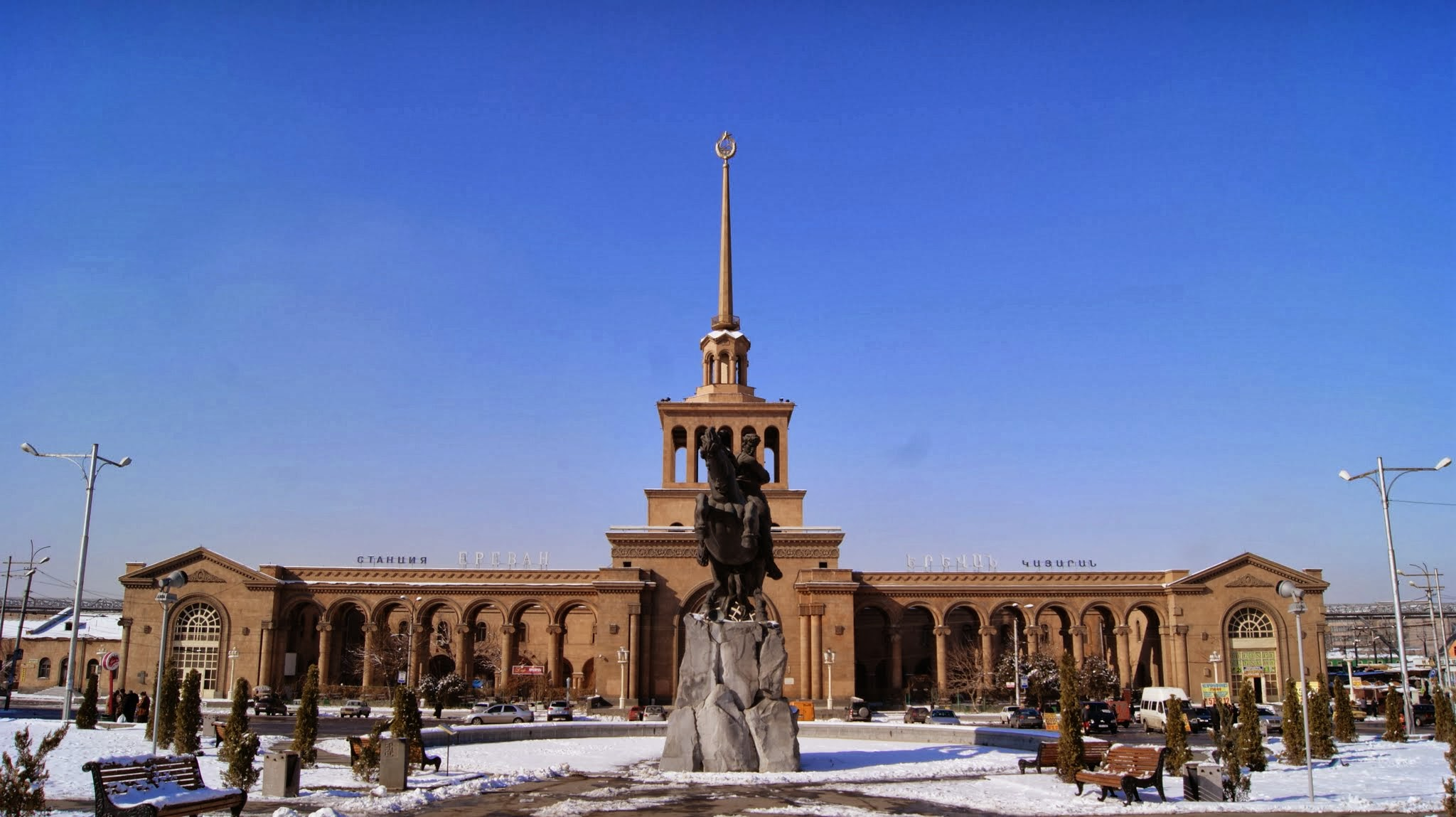

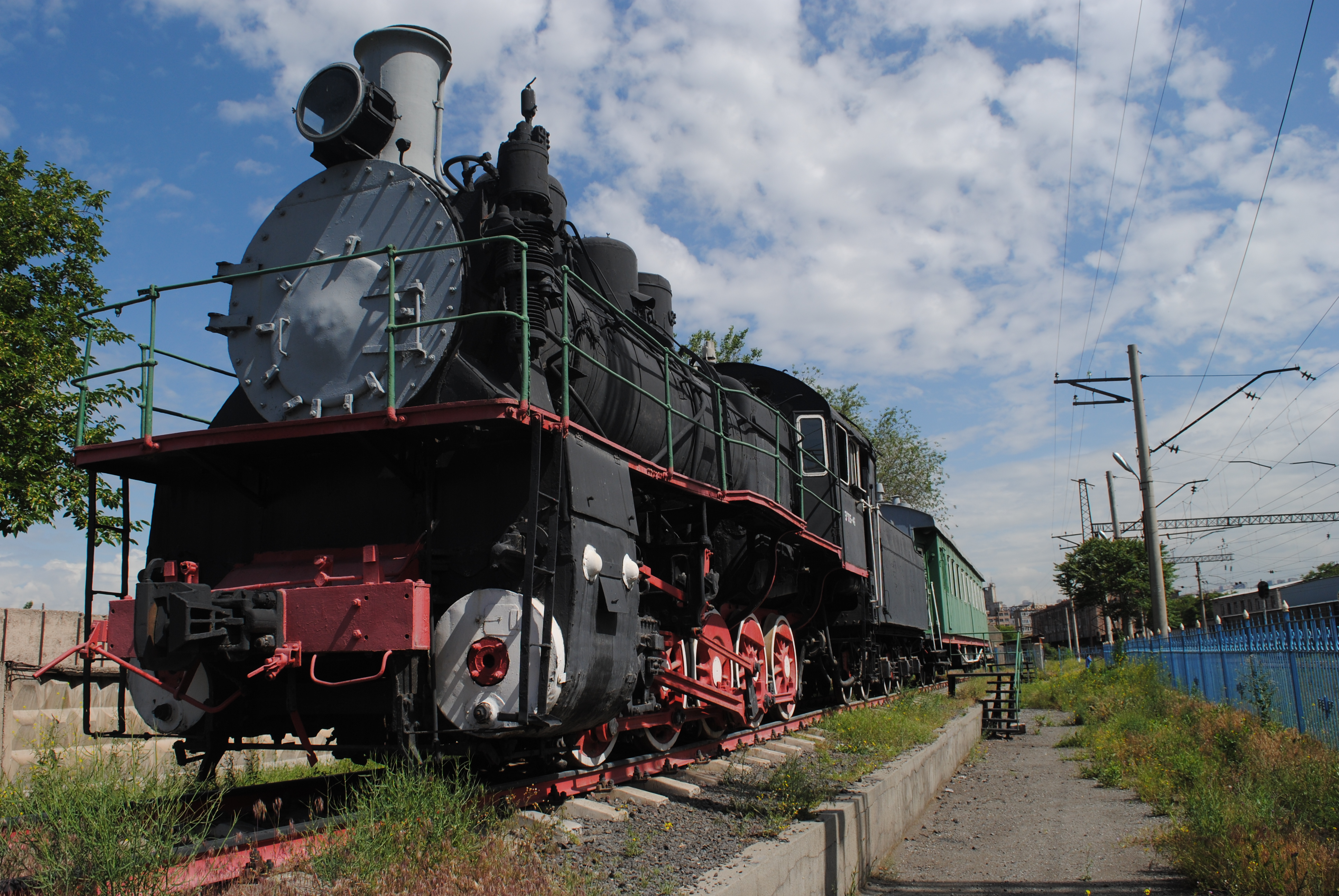

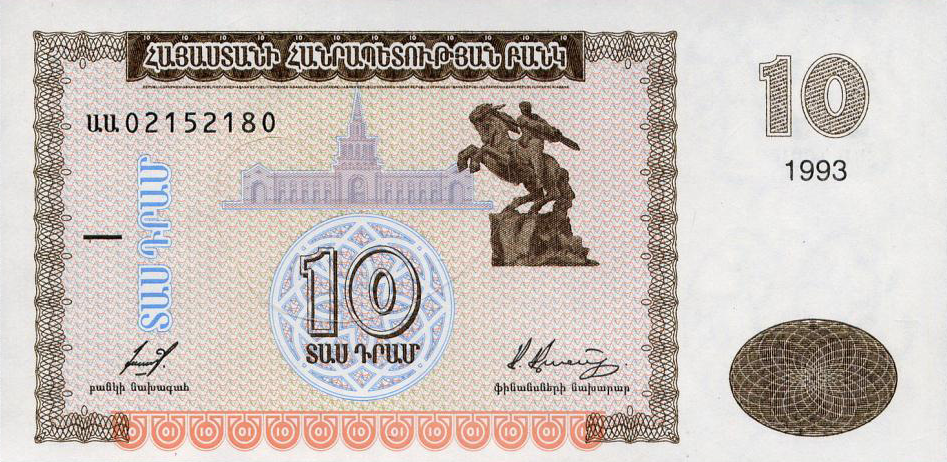
Yerevan railway terminal obverse on 10 dram banknote (1993)

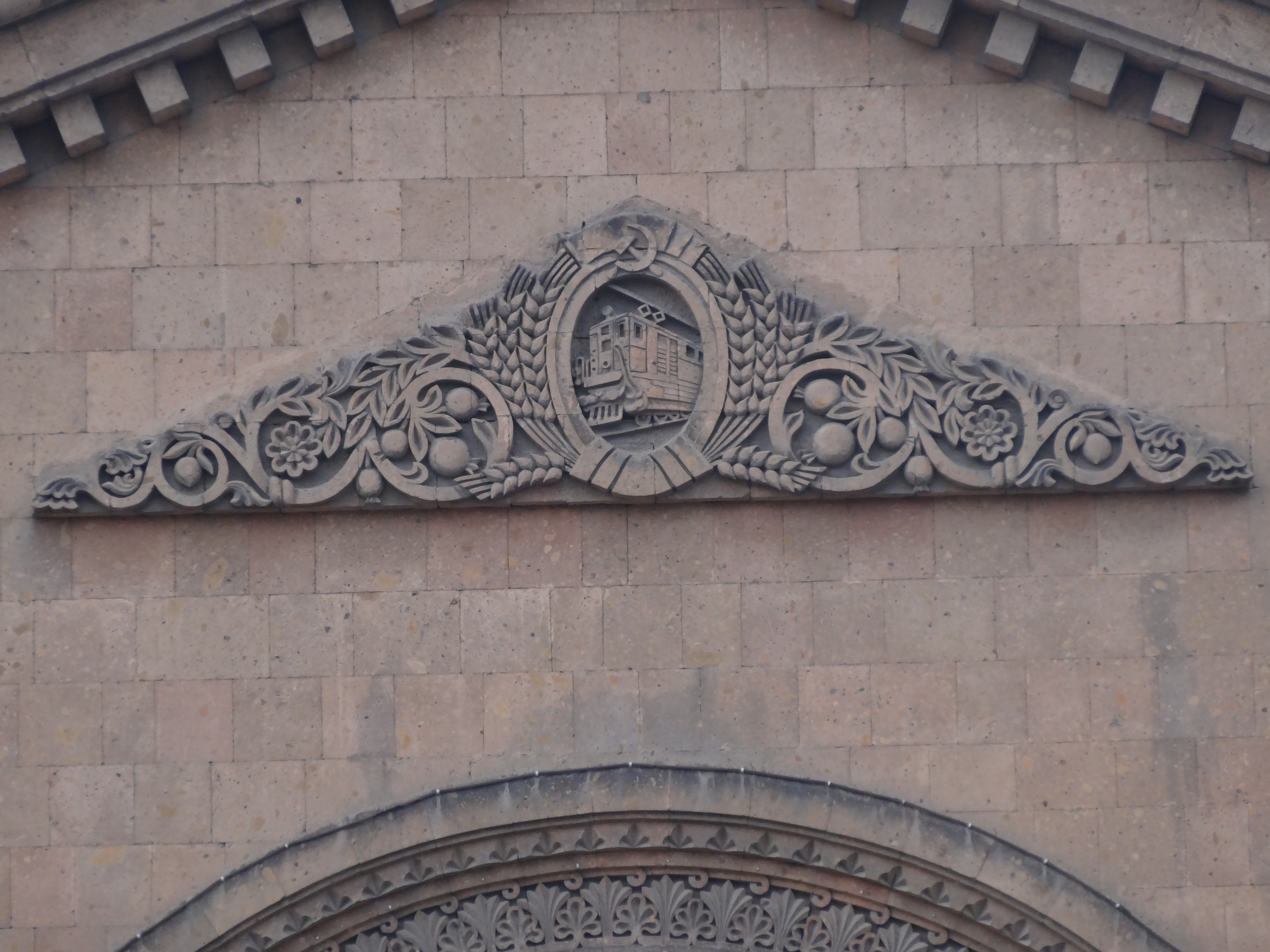

== See also ==
- List of railway stations in Armenia
- Transport in Armenia
- Rail transport in Europe
