= South Caucasus Railway =

Russian-owned railroad operator in Armenia

ՀԿԵ / ЮКЖД South Caucasus Railway

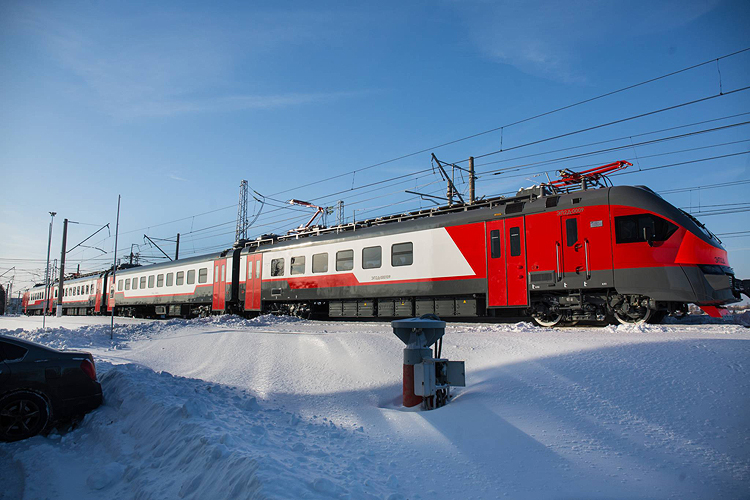
- Native name: Հարավկովկասյան երկաթուղի
- Industry: Railway
- Headquarters: Yerevan railway station, Yerevan, Armenia
- Area served: Armenia
- Services: Rail transport, Cargo transport
- Owner: Russian Railways
- Website: www.railway.am

ՀԿԵ / ЮКЖД South Caucasus Railway
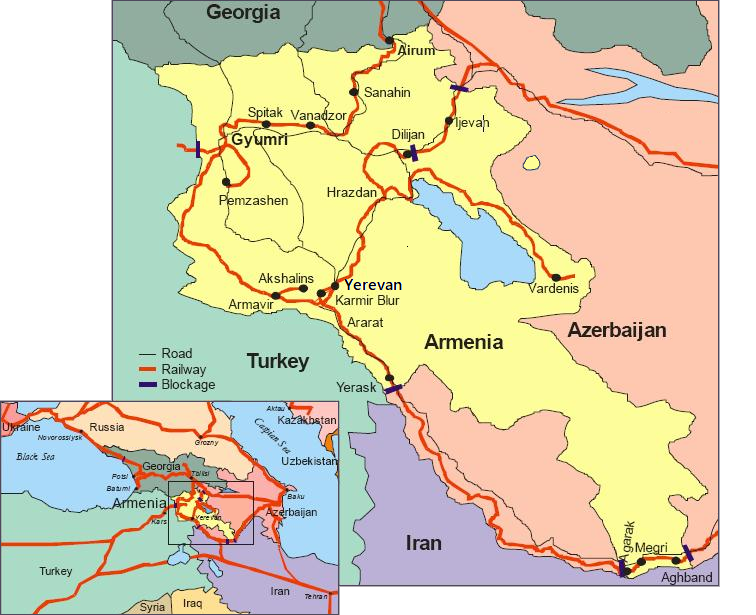
- Armenia's railway network.

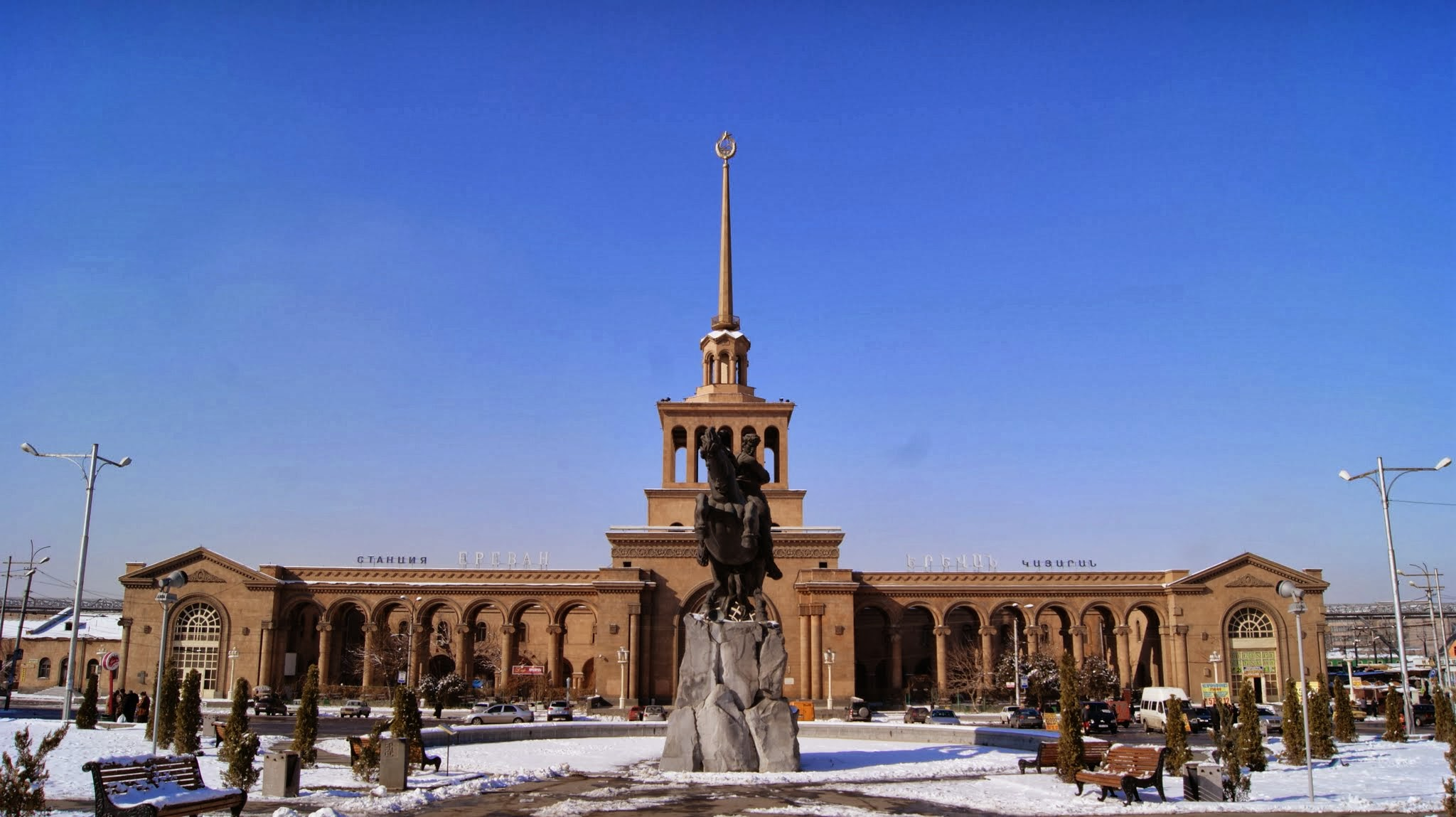
- Yerevan railway station — the biggest in Armenia.

Overview
- Headquarters: Yerevan
- Reporting mark: HYU / YuKŽD
- Locale: Armenia
- Dates of operation: 2008–present
- Predecessor: Armenian Railways

Technical
- Track gauge: 1,520 mm (4 ft 11 27/32 in)
- Electrification: 3 kV DC
- Length: 780 km (480 mi)

Other
- Website: www.railway.am

South Caucasus Railway (SCR) (Armenian: Հարավկովկասյան երկաթուղի, ՀԿԵ, romanized: Haravkovkasyan yerkat’ughi, HKE, Russian: Южно-Кавказская железная дорога, ЮКЖД) is the sole railway company in Armenia, owned by Russian Railways, responsible for all inter-city, commuter, and freight rail transport in Armenia. The network consists of 780 kilometers (480 mi) of track with all lines in the Russian gauge. Railroads in Armenia are 100% electrified.

== Main information ==
On 13 February 2008, the Government of Armenia signed an agreement to transfer 100% of the state-owned Armenian Railways to Russian Railways. According to the agreement, the concession period is 30 years, with a possible extension for another 10 years by mutual agreement of the parties. In accordance with the terms of the tender, existing railway employees (4,300 people), except those of retirement age, were transferred to the staff of South Caucasus Railway on salary increases of up to 20%.

== Routes ==
South Caucasus Railway currently operates the following services:

1. Armenia–Georgia express/sleeper service: Yerevan to Tbilisi / Batumi via Gyumri and Vanadzor

2. Yerevan to Araks (Myasnikan) / Gyumri - 3 services a day plus 1 additional short journey to Araks, and a weekend express service (without stops between Yerevan and Gyumri). An onward branch from Gyumri to Artik, Pemzashen and Maralik has not run a passenger service since 2013, whilst a freight only line also branches from Armavir [the station prior to Araks] to the Metsamor power plant.

3. Yerevan to Ararat & Yeraskh - 1 service a day

4. Summer-only service from Yerevan to Hrazdan, Sevan and Shorzha (a branch from Hrazdan to Dilijan via the 8km-long Meghradzor-Fioletovo tunnel has not been used since 2012 [and onward to Ijevan since 1992])

The latter route is used year-round by freight trains, running beyond Shorzha to transport gold ore from Sotk mine just beyond Vardenis back via the Yerevan western bypass freight railway line to the refinery in Ararat (as well as by trains serving the Hrazdan Cement plant located 5km up the Dilijan branch). A link also exists to the Yerevan Metro at Charbakh Depot via the Karmir Blur siding.

== Rolling stock ==
Passenger trips are served by two types of trains: Soviet ER2 and modern EP2D trains.

The Soviet ER2 trains consist of 3-4 cars, and run on Yerevan - Araks, Yerevan - Gyumri (evening departure from Yerevan, morning from Gyumri), and Almast - Shorzha routes.

EP2D trains consist of 2 cars, and run on the Yerevan - Yeraskh, Yerevan - Gyumri (morning and afternoon from Yerevan, noon and evening from Gyumri), and the Yerevan - Gyumri weekend express routes.

== International links ==
- Azerbaijan – closed – same gauge
- (Georgia (country)) Georgia – open – same gauge
- Iran – via Azerbaijan's Nakhchivan enclave – closed – break of gauge – 1,520 mm (4 ft 11 27/32 in)/1,435 mm (4 ft 8 1/2 in)
- Turkey – Akhuryan/Doğukapı, closed since 1993 – break of gauge -1,520 mm (4 ft 11 27/32 in)/1,435 mm (4 ft 8 1/2 in)

Except for the one with Georgia, all international railway links between Armenia and its neighbors have been closed since 1993. In the ceasefire agreement that ended the 2020 Nagorno-Karabakh War, Armenia and Azerbaijan committed to "unblocking communications" between the two countries. Since then, the two countries have begun work on restoring the southern railway link, which will go from Yeraskh into Nakhchivan and then cross back into Armenia through Meghri and enter mainland Azerbaijan, connecting to Azerbaijan's main line to Baku via Horadiz. In January 2022, Armenian deputy prime minister Mher Grigoryan stated that the Armenian section of the railway would cost about $200 million and take three years to complete. Normalization talks between Armenia and Turkey since 2022 have also raised hopes that the railway link between the two countries via Gyumri and Kars could be restored, although no agreement has been reached.

== See also ==
- Kars–Gyumri–Tbilisi railway
- List of railway companies
- Rail transport in Europe
- Russian gauge
- Transport in Armenia
