= 2020 Russian Mil Mi-24 shootdown =

Helicopter crash in Armenia

Russian Mil Mi-24 shootdown
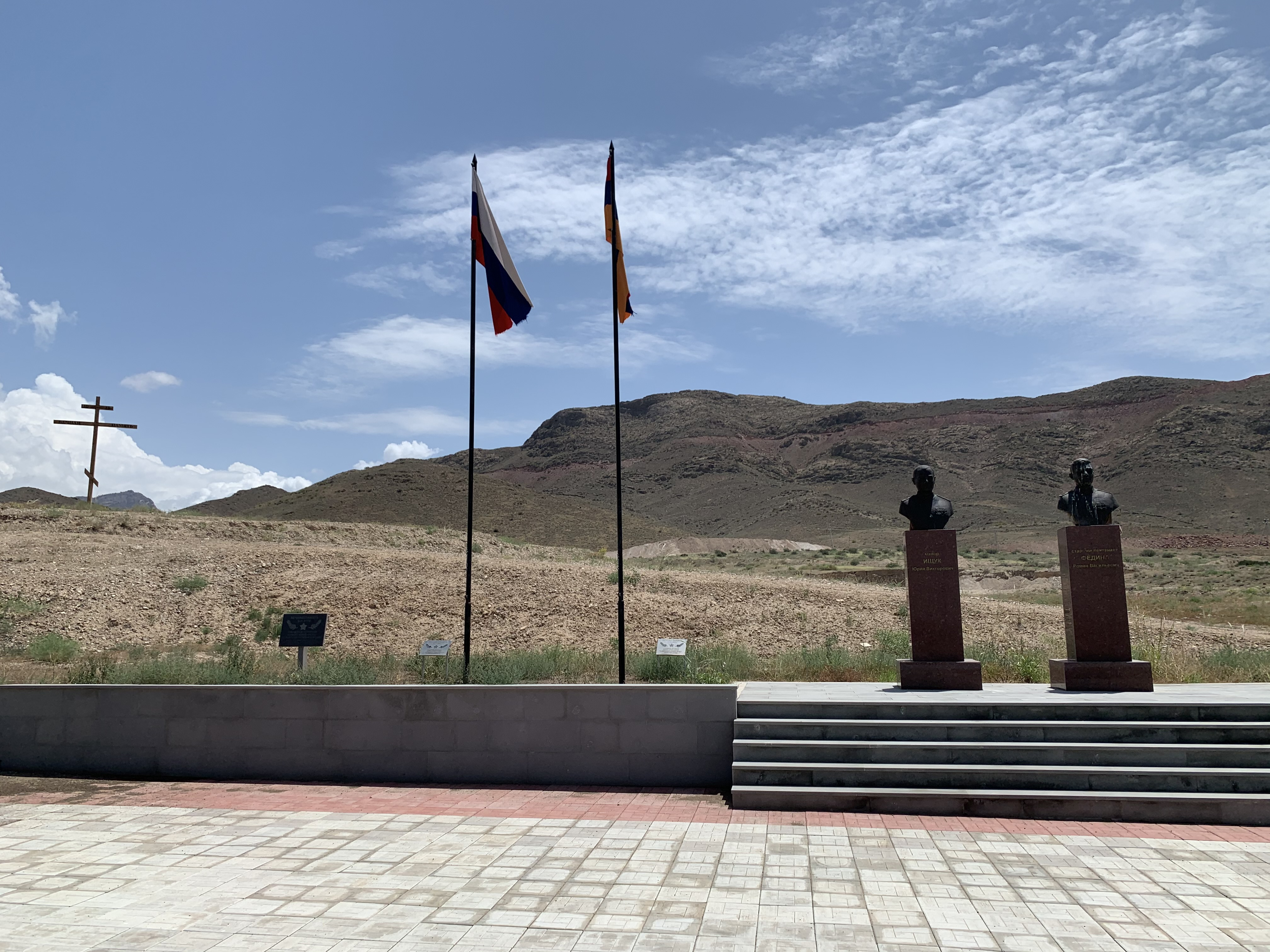

Shootdown
- Date: 9 November 2020
- Summary: Shot down by man-portable air-defense system surface-to-air missile
- Site: Near Yeraskh village, Ararat Province, Armenia

Aircraft
- Aircraft type: Mil Mi-24
- Operator: Russian Air Force
- Occupants: 3
- Passengers: 0
- Crew: 3
- Fatalities: 2
- Injuries: 1
- Survivors: 1

On 9 November 2020, a Russian Mil Mi-24 helicopter (NATO reporting name "Hind") was shot down by the Azerbaijani Armed Forces during the Second Nagorno-Karabakh War. It was shot down near Yeraskh, in Armenia, a few kilometers away from Azerbaijan's Nakhchivan Autonomous Republic, as a result of fire from the ground from man-portable air-defense system. Two of the crew members died, while another was injured as a result of the attack. Azerbaijani authorities soon issued a statement of apology, saying that the shootdown happened by mistake and offered compensation.

== Events ==
=== Background ===
The shootdown occurred during a war over the disputed Nagorno-Karabakh region, which is de facto controlled by the self-proclaimed and unrecognized Republic of Artsakh, which is supported by its ally, Armenia, but is de jure part of Azerbaijan. On 8 November 2020, the Azerbaijani forces seized control of Shusha, after a four-day long battle over the city.

=== Shootdown ===
The shootdown took place on 9 November 2020, near Yeraskh, in Armenia, few kilometers away from Azerbaijan's Nakhchivan Autonomous Republic, and some 70 kilometres (43 mi) from the border to Nagorno-Karabakh, as a result of fire from the ground from MANPADS. The helicopter was accompanying the convoy of the Russian 102nd Military Base in Gyumri. Soon after, Azerbaijan took responsibility for the attack, with its Ministry of Foreign Affairs stating that the shootdown happened by accident, expressing apologies to Russia and readiness to pay compensation. According to Azerbaijan, the Russian helicopter flew in the dark, at low altitude and outside the detection zone of the Azerbaijani air defense radars. Also, Azerbaijani authorities stated that the helicopter flew in close proximity to the Armenia–Azerbaijan border during a time of conflict and that the Russian helicopters were not previously seen in the area.

== Aftermath ==
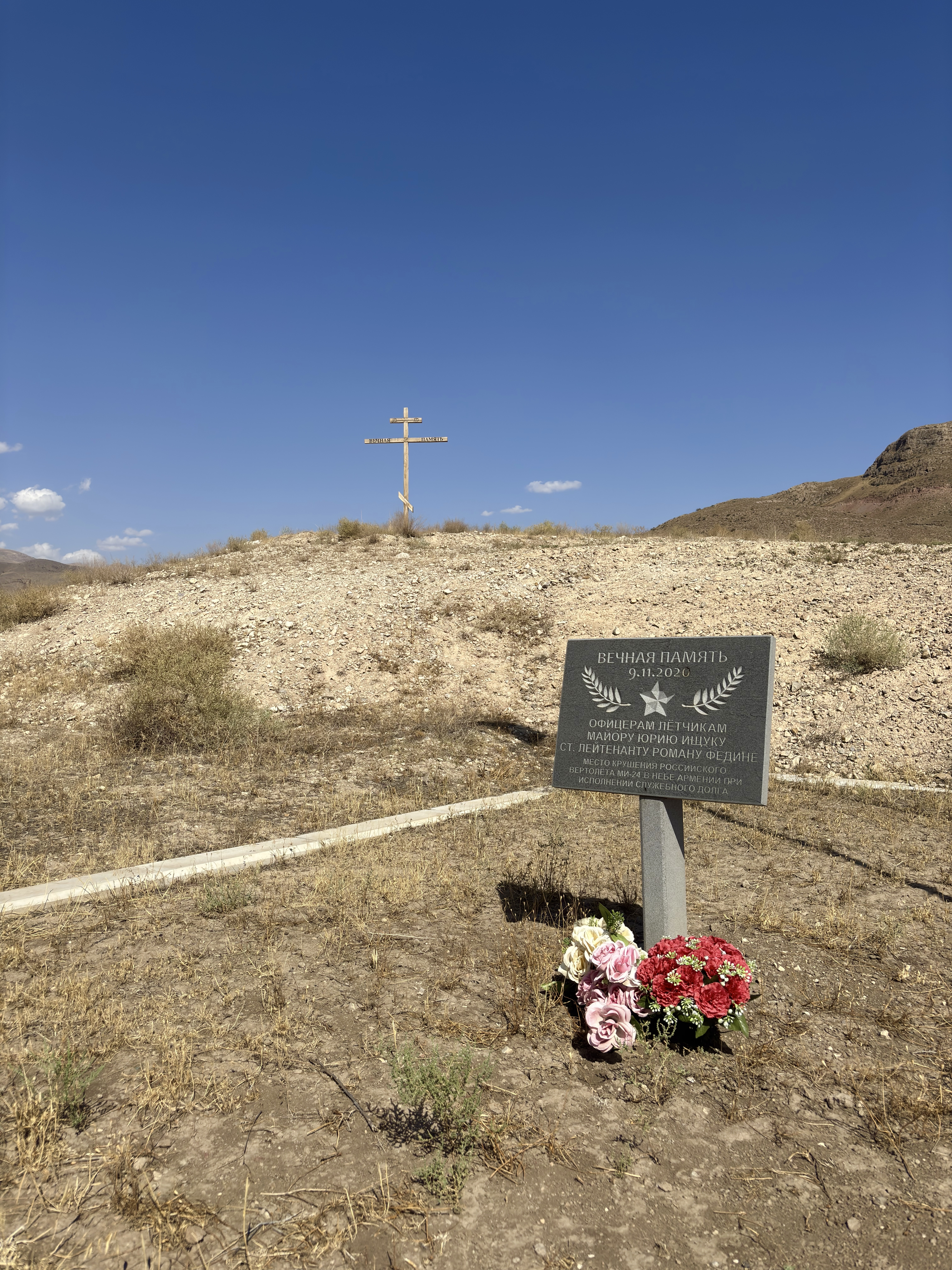
Memorial plaque

=== Investigation ===
Russia's military base in Armenia and Prosecutor General's Office of Azerbaijan started an investigation on the incident. On 4 January 2021, military investigators announced that they are treating the incident as 'wilful murder," rather than the previous "death through negligence."

=== Ceasefire agreement ===
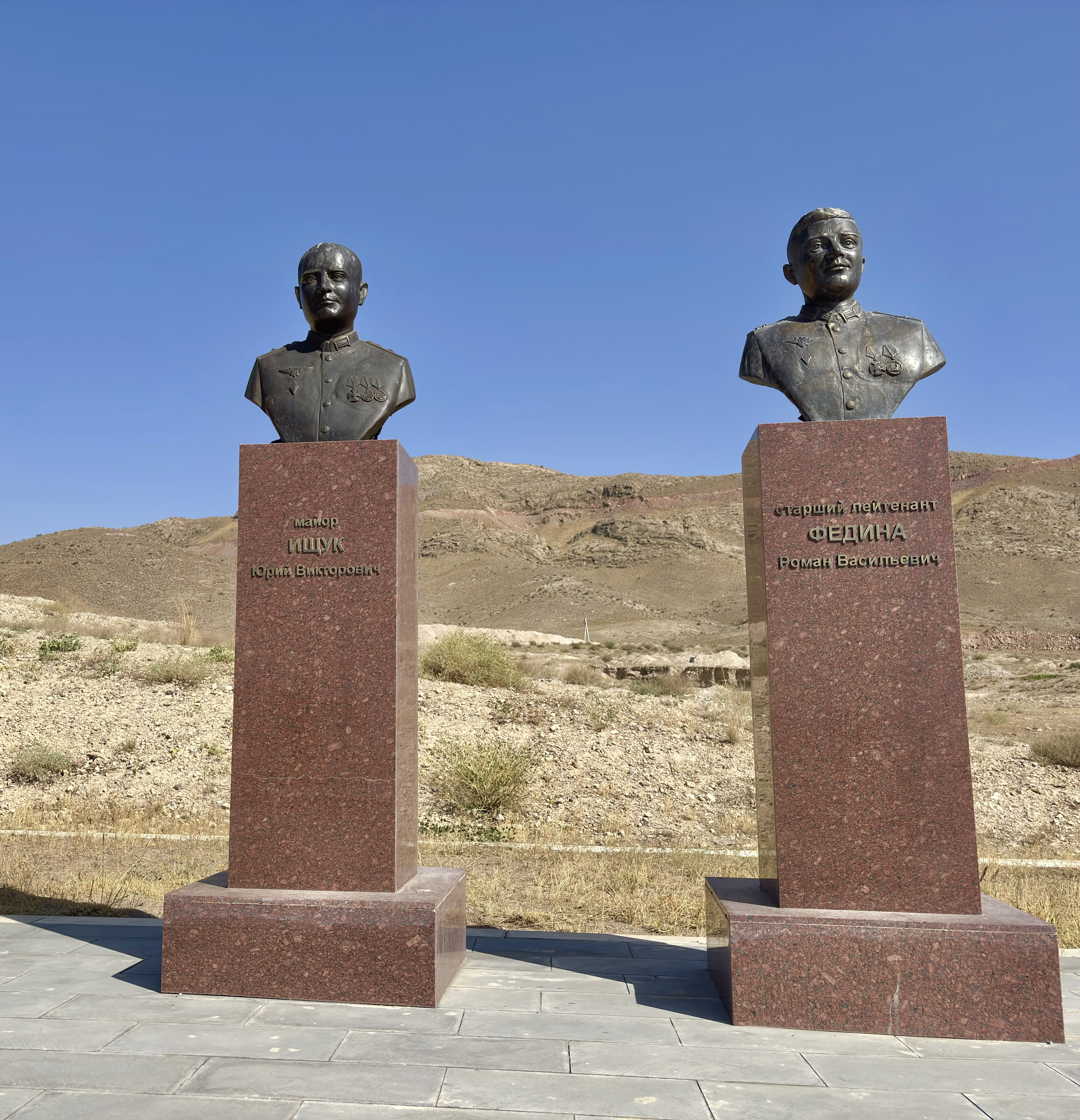
Memorial in 2025

The incidence occurred the day when the ceasefire agreement was signed. According to Anton Troianovski and Carlotta Gall of The New York Times, this potentially gave Russia a reason to intervene in the war. However, what role, if any, the shooting down of the Mi-24 contributed to the signing of the ceasefire agreement remains unclear. Russian president Vladimir Putin delivered an ultimatum to the Azerbaijani president Ilham Aliyev. According to Troianovski and Gall, in this ultimatum, Russia stated that if Azerbaijan did not cease its operations after seizing control of Shusha, it will intervene. The same night, an unknown missile hit an open area in Khyrdalan, near Baku, without causing any injuries, according to the Azerbaijani sources. Also, yet again on the same day, a video emerged on social media apparently showing Armenian forces launching a Russian-made Iskander missile into Azerbaijan. The former Head of the Military Control Service of the Armenian MoD Movses Hakobyan, before resigning from his post on 19 November 2020, confirmed the use of an Iskander missile on Azerbaijan by Armenia, though he did not say where the missile hit.

== Reactions ==
=== Involved parties ===
Soon after the shootdown, Azerbaijan's Minister of Defence, Zakir Hasanov, sent a letter of condolences to Russia's Minister of Defence, Sergey Shoygu. Also, Russian Ministry of Foreign Affairs stated that they positively assessed Azerbaijan immediately taking responsibility of the incident. Russian President Vladimir Putin later awarded the servicemen on the helicopter with the Order of Courage.

=== International ===
On 9 November, CSTO, which Russia is a member of, issued a statement, expressing its concerns over the shootdown. On 18 November, the President of Armenia, Armen Sarkissian, signed a decree on awarding the Russian pilots with For Military Merit Medal. On 12 December, the Armenian government unveiled a temporary memorial plaque in Yeraskh to commemorate the Russian pilots killed in the shootdown, and a prayer service was held in the area.

== See also ==
- 1991 Azerbaijani Mil Mi-8 shootdown
- 2014 Armenian Mil Mi-24 shootdown
- 2015 Russian Sukhoi Su-24 shootdown
- 2018 Russian Ilyushin Il-20 shootdown
- List of aircraft shootdowns during the First Nagorno-Karabakh War and posterior conflict
