= 2014 Armenian Mil Mi-24 shootdown =

Helicopter shootdown in Aghdam

Armenian Mil Mi-24 shootdown
- The helicopter crashing to the ground seconds after being hit by an Azerbaijani anti-aircraft missile

Shootdown
- Date: 12 November 2014
- Summary: Shot down by anti-aircraft missile
- Site: near Gəngərli village, Aghdam, Republic of Artsakh

Aircraft
- Aircraft type: Mil Mi-24
- Operator: Disputed: Armed Forces of Armenia or Artsakh Defense Army
- Registration: 48 BLUE
- Occupants: 3
- Crew: 3
- Fatalities: 3
- Survivors: 0

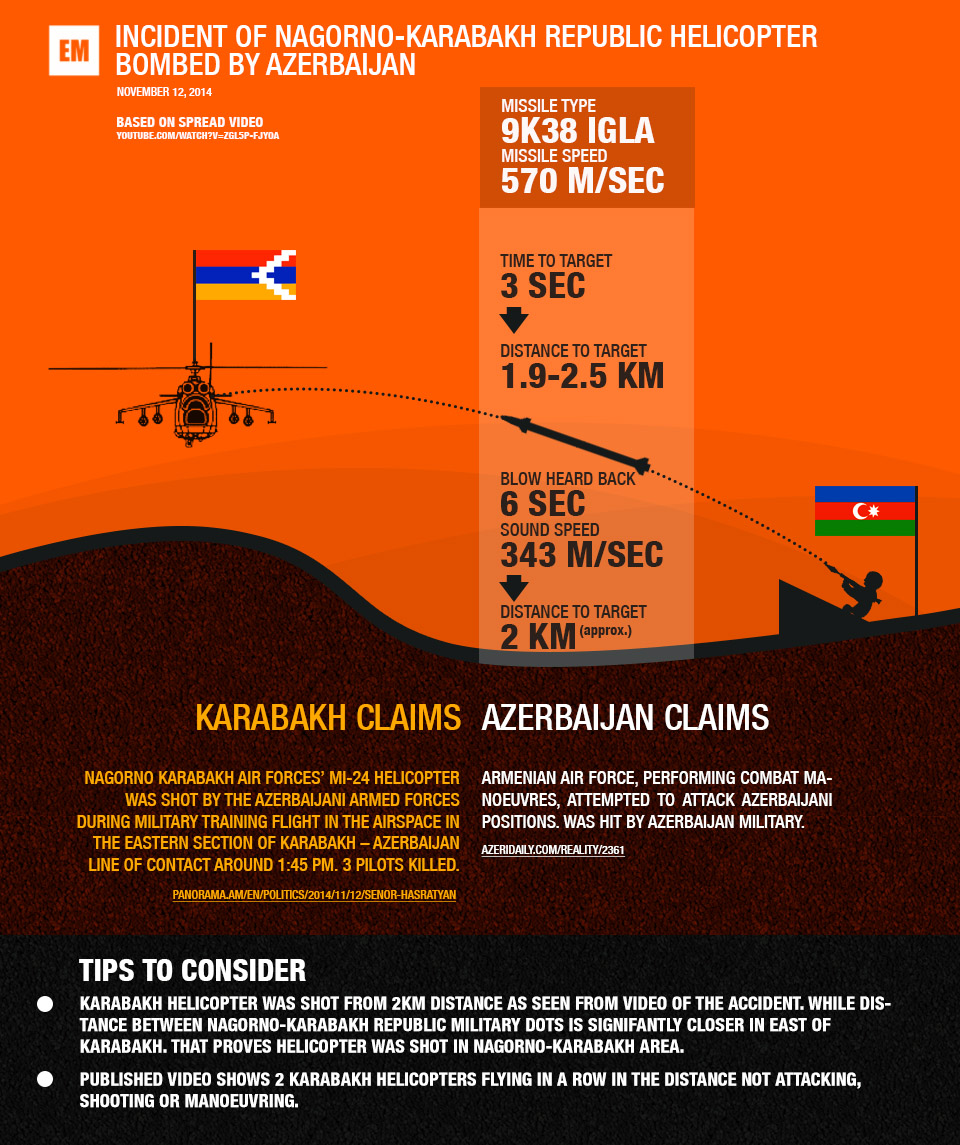
An infographic explaining the incident

On 12 November 2014, an Armenian Mil Mi-24 attack helicopter (NATO reporting name "Hind") was shot down by Azerbaijani Armed Forces during the Nagorno-Karabakh conflict, killing all three crew members.

== Events ==
According to the Armenian side, the helicopter belonged to the Nagorno-Karabakh Defense Army and was participating in the week-long joint Armenian-NKR Unity 2014 military exercises in the disputed region. A statement released by Azerbaijan's Defense Ministry claimed the helicopter belonged to the Armed Forces of Armenia and was preparing to attack Azerbaijani positions in the Aghdam district. This was dismissed by Armenian and NKR defense ministry officials, who stated that the helicopter was not armed and did not enter Azerbaijani airspace.

According to British analyst Thomas de Waal, it was shot down "in the no-man's land between the two armies" and added that the helicopter "was not attacking Azerbaijani positions but had apparently broken into an informal five-kilometer no-fly zone the two sides had agreed on."

The Azerbaijani serviceman who shot down the helicopter, Ilkin Muradov, was awarded the 3rd degree medal "For Distinguished Military Service" and a valuable prize.

Analyst Thomas de Waal described the shootdown as "the worst military incident in more than 20 years since the cease-fire." On the same day, footage appeared in the Azerbaijani media purporting to show the moment of the shootdown. Two Mi-24s are seen flying parallel to the line of contact, as the launch of a surface-to-air missile, identified as an Igla-S MANPAD, is heard off screen and one of the helicopters is struck and crashes to the ground.

After the shootdown, Armenian side claimed that Azeri forces continued firing at the crash site, preventing Armenian forces from retrieving the bodies for several days. On 22 November 2014, according to Armenian side, units of Armenian special forces successfully recovered the bodies of the three Armenian pilots, along with parts of the helicopter. During the operation, the Armenian side claims that two Azeri soldiers who tried to prevent the recovery of the remains of the pilots were killed. The Armenian side did not sustain any casualties. The Azerbaijani Defense Ministry rejected the Armenian side's claims about carrying out the "special operation" on this territory. According to the Azerbaijani Defense Ministry, these territories are fully under the control of the Azerbaijani armed forces. Azeri military experts on aviation flights have stated that video materials showing bodies, provided by the Armenian side, are actually carefully edited materials.

"Hay Zinvour", the official newspaper of the Ministry of Defense of Armenia confirmed that three deceased crew members were trained at Military-Aviation Institute in Yerevan. The three killed officers, according to the Armenian side, were buried with full military honors on November 25 in Yerevan's Yerablur military cemetery. A day earlier their bodies were placed at the Saint Sarkis Church in Nor Nork District for a farewell ceremony which was attended by President Serzh Sargsyan, Prime Minister Hovik Abrahamyan, Defense Minister Seyran Ohanyan and other officials.

== Reactions ==
- Armenia — The Foreign Ministry "strongly condemned" the shootdown and added that "The Azerbaijani side is grossly violating the commitments on the peaceful resolution of the conflict reached during the recent summits." Defense Ministry spokesman Artsrun Hovannisian warned that "The consequences of this unprecedented escalation of tension will be very painful for Azerbaijan."
- Azerbaijan — In the statement released on 20 November 2014, the Ministry of Foreign Affairs says that "...two "Mi-24" attack helicopters of the air forces of Armenia approached and made attack maneuvers in the immediate vicinity of the positions of the armed forces of the Republic of Azerbaijan nearby the village of Kengerly in the occupied Agdam district of the Republic of Azerbaijan..." The ministry also adds that "The downed helicopter belongs to air base No. 15 stationed in Erebuni military base near Yerevan, the Republic of Armenia (i.e. not NKR), and its crew members were military servicemen of the Armenian armed forces. These are yet another manifestation of Armenia's aggression, its direct involvement in the occupation of the territories and continued use of force against the Republic of Azerbaijan" and refers to United Nations Security Council Resolution 853 adopted in 1993.

== See also ==
- 2020 Russian Mil Mi-24 shootdown
- List of aircraft shootdowns during the First Nagorno-Karabakh War and posterior conflict
