= Dalarik =

Village in Armavir, Armenia

Dalarik Դալարիկ
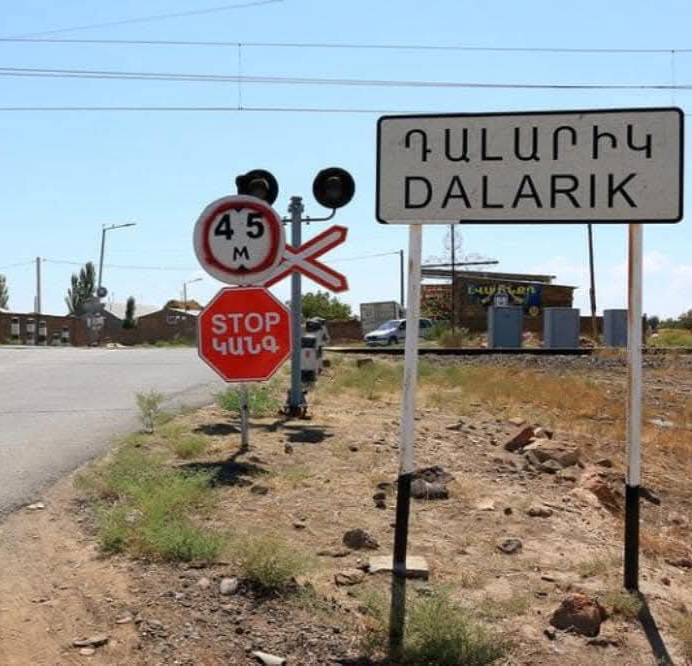
- Entrance to the village of Dalarik

- Location within Armenia
- Coordinates: 40°13′06″N 43°51′37″E
- Country: Armenia
- Marz (Province): Armavir
- Founded: 1902

Population (2011)
  - Total: 3,975
- Time zone: UTC+4 ( )
  - Summer (DST): UTC+5 ( )

Dalarik (Armenian: Դալարիկ; until 1965, Mastara) is a village in the Armavir Province of Armenia.

== See also ==
- Armavir Province
