= Gyumri railway station =

Railway station in Gyumri, Armenia

Gyumri railway station Armenian: Գյումրու Երկաթուղային Կայարան
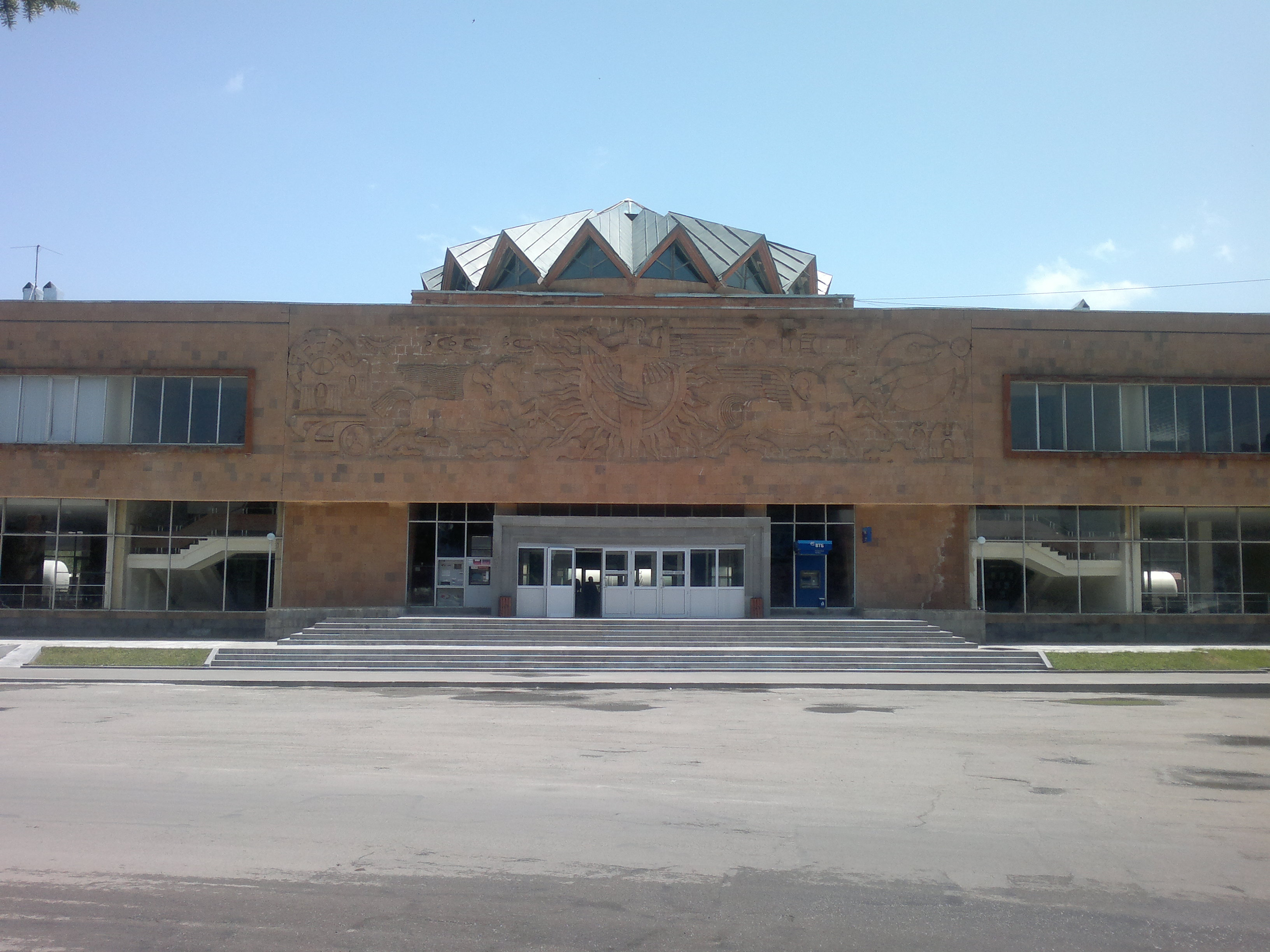

General information
- Location: Gyumri; Armenia
- Coordinates: 40°47′15″N 43°51′36″E
- Owner: Russian Railways
- Operator: South Caucasus Railway
- Line: Kars–Gyumri–Tbilisi railway

History
- Opened: 1897

Services
Preceding station	South Caucasus Railway	Following station
Terminus	Yerevan–Batumi	Bayandur towards Yerevan
Location
- Location within Armenia

Gyumri railway station (Armenian: Գյումրու Երկաթուղային Կայարան), is the oldest railway station in Armenia and the main station of the city of Gyumri.

== History ==
The railway junction of Gyumri is the oldest and the largest one in Armenia. It was formed in 1897. The first railway link to Gyumri that connected the city (then officially called Alexandropol) with Tiflis was completed in 1899. The rail line was then extended from Alexandropol to Yerevan (in 1902), Kars (in 1902), Jolfa (in 1906), and Tabriz. As a result, Alexandropol became an important rail hub.

The present building of the station, built in 1979, was designed by local architect Rafik Yeghoyan, and in some of its features, particularly in the spatial composition of its entrance hall, echoes medieval Armenian architecture, a tendency sometimes characteristic of soviet Armenian modernist architecture.

As of 2018, the Gyumri railway station operates regular trips to Yerevan, Tbilisi and Batumi. The South Caucasus Railway is the current operator of the railway sector in Armenia.
