= Myasnikyan =

Village in Armavir, Armenia

Myasnikyan Մյասնիկյան
- Location within Armenia
- Coordinates: 40°10′39″N 43°54′23″E
- Country: Armenia
- Province: Armavir

Population (2011)
  - Total: 4,036
- Time zone: UTC+4 ( )
  - Summer (DST): UTC+5 ( )

Myasnikyan (Armenian: Մյասնիկյան) is a town in the Armavir Province of Armenia. The town is named for Aleksandr Myasnikyan, the Armenian Bolshevik revolutionary and statesman who led Soviet Armenia at the beginning of Lenin's New Economic Policy (NEP). It is the location of Araks railway station. The town's population is 4,036 people, which is mainly populated by Armenians and Kurds (including Yazidis).
