= Yeraskh =

Yeraskh Երասխ
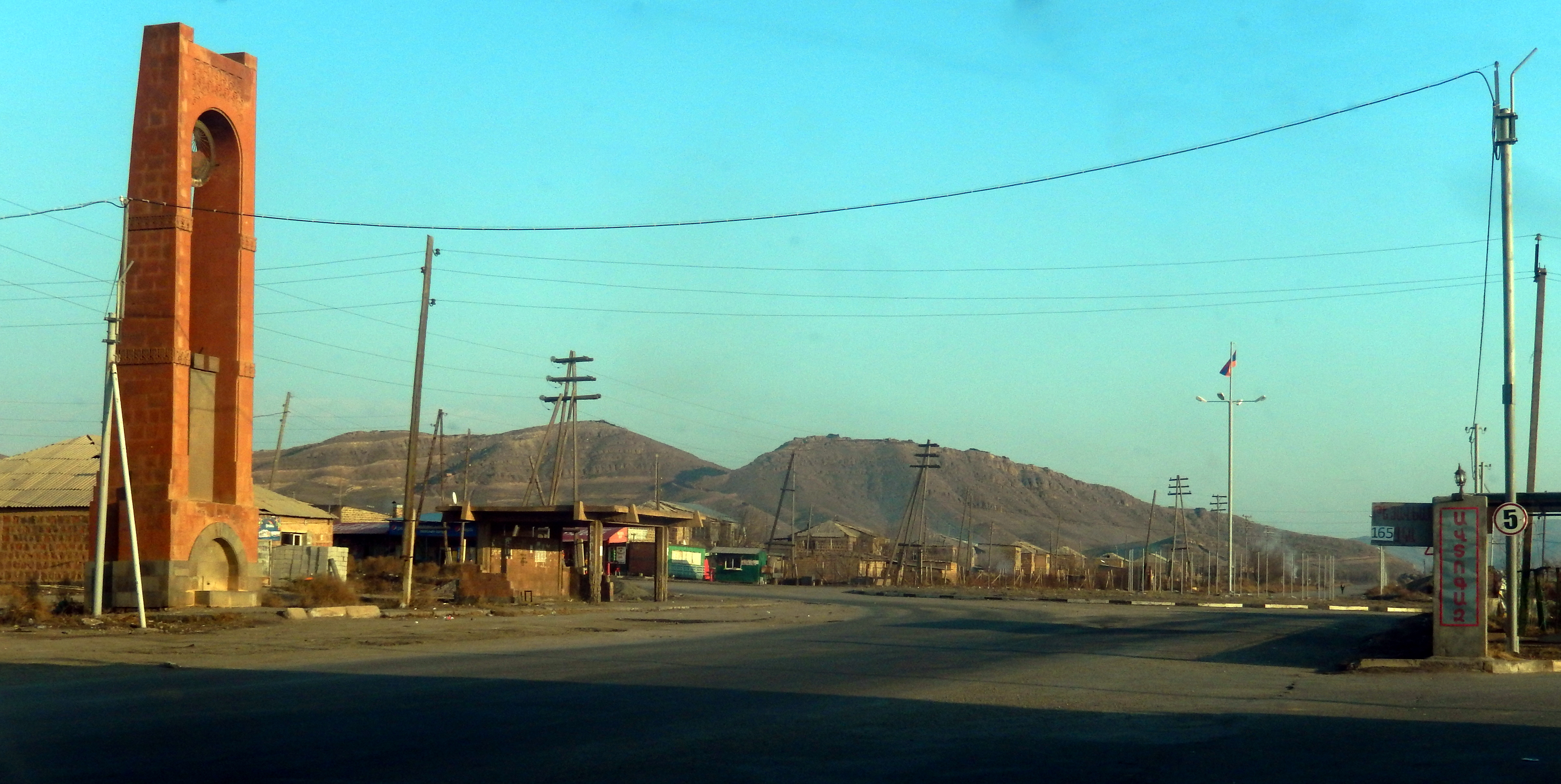
- Interactive map of Yeraskh
- Location within Armenia Location within Ararat
- Coordinates: 39°44′29″N 44°49′44″E
- Country: Armenia
- Province: Ararat
- Municipality: Ararat
- Elevation: 810 m (2,660 ft)

Population (2011)
  - Total: 635
- Time zone: UTC+4
  - Summer (DST): UTC+5

Yeraskh (Armenian: Երասխ) is a village in the Ararat Municipality of the Ararat Province of Armenia. Yeraskh is the closest Armenian village to the closed border with Azerbaijan. The settlement is adjacent to Heydarabad, Azerbaijan across the border, is beside European route E99 highway in Turkey, and is also near to the Iranian village of Qush.

The train station in Yeraskh was previously connected with the Azerbaijani exclave of Nakhchivan, and used to be the main road and rail connections between Nakhchivan and Azerbaijan proper. The rail line also was the only direct connection between the former USSR and Iran. Because of the hostilities between Armenia and Azerbaijan over Nagorno-Karabakh, the border is under severe blockade and no trains are allowed to pass.

On 9 November 2020, a Russian Mil Mi-24 helicopter (NATO reporting name "Hind") was shot down near Yeraskh by the Azerbaijani Armed Forces with a MANPADS during the 2020 Nagorno-Karabakh war. Two of the crew members died, while another was injured as a result of the attack.

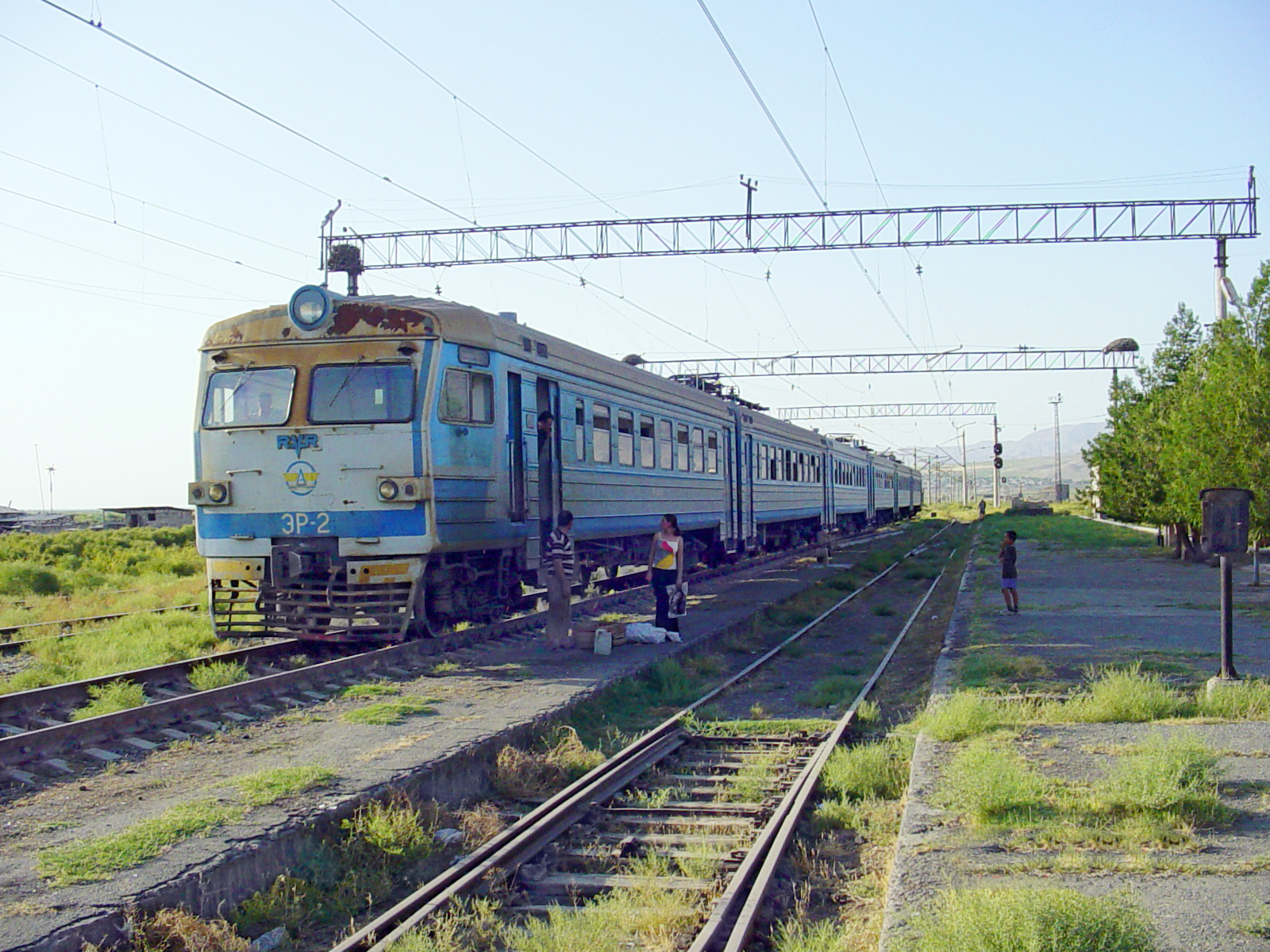
Commuter train in Yeraskh after arrival from Yerevan
