= Salome of Ujarma =

Salome (Armenian: Սալոմե, Georgian: სალომე; born sometime after 297, died about 361) was an Armenian princess from the Arsacid dynasty who was married into the Chosroid Dynasty of Iberia. She was a daughter of King Tiridates III of Armenia and Queen Ashkhen. She is known from the early medieval Georgian chronicle Life of Kings. In Georgian tradition, she is referred to as Salome of Ujarma (სალომე უჯარმელი, salome ujarmeli) after a castle where she is credited to have erected a cross. She has been canonized by the Armenian and Georgian churches. Local canonisations are recognised throughout the Orthodox Church.

According to the genealogical reconstructions, Salome had a brother called Khosrov III and a sister, name unknown, who married St. Husik I, one of the earlier Catholicoi of the Armenian Apostolic Church.

== Biography ==
Her birthplace in Armenia is unknown and little is known on her early life. Salome was born at an unknown date sometime after 297. Her birth name was Beoun and changed her name to Salome after she married Rev II of Iberia. Rev II was the first son of King Mirian III of Iberia and his second wife, Queen Nana of Iberia. Mirian III ruled as King of Iberia from 284 until his death in 361. Rev II co-ruled with his father as co-king from 345 until 361.

Mirian III established peaceful relations with the Roman Emperor Constantine the Great and Tiridates III, after Constantine declared Christianity as the official head religion of the Roman Empire. In result of Mirian III's established relations, he arranged for Rev II to marry Salome in 326. Through marriage, Salome became a Queen of Iberia who co-ruled with Rev II and her in-laws from 345 until 361. Salome bore Rev II two sons: Saurmag II and Trdat, also known as Tiridates. Through her sons, Salome and Rev II would have further descendants.

Rev II had an appanage at Ujarma where she lived with her husband and their family. Prior to converting to Christianity, Salome was a follower of Zoroastrianism. Salome in 337 played a role in the conversion of Iberia to Christianity. Salome is a contemporary and is associated with the life of Saint Nino. Saint Nino was the woman who converted Iberians to the Christian faith.

Salome along with Perozhavra of Sivnia a noblewoman who was married to the ruler of the Kartli region, were the helpers and closest companions of Saint Nino. Both women while serving in their imperial roles, succeeded in serving Saint Nino. Saint Nino taught Salome and Perozhavra to pray; the women fasted regularly and both women performed good works. As Salome and Perozhavra were women of influential social status they both assisted Saint Nino in spreading the Christian faith.

After the whole Iberian royal family were converted to Christianity by Saint Nino from the orders of Mirian III, Salome erected a cross in Ujarma. When Saint Nino fell ill at the village of Bodbe, Salome and Perozhavra stood by Saint Nino's bed and wept bitterly as she was dying. On her death bed, Saint Nino told Salome and Perozhavra her life story. Saint Nino died sometime between 338 and 340.

As a dedication to honor the memory of Saint Nino; as a continuation of the works of Saint Nino and continue the spread of Christianity in Iberia, Salome and Perozhavra wrote a biography on her life titled Saint Nino, The Life of Saint Nino, Enlightener of Georgia.

Salome died at an unknown date about 361, around the same time that her husband died. Salome, along with Perozhavra, are Saints in the Greek Orthodox Church of Antioch and the Georgian Orthodox Church. Their feast day is on 15 January, the day following the commemoration of Saint Nino.

== Sources ==
- St. Salome and St. Perozhavra of Ojarma Commemorated on January 15 at The Self-Ruled Antiochian Orthodox Christian Archdiocese of North America
- Saints Salome of Ujarma and Perozhavra of Sivnia (4th century) Memory 15 (28) January
- Berman, Michael (2009). The Shamanic Themes in Georgian Folktales. Cambridge Scholars Publishing. ISBN 978-1-4438-0816-3.
- Lang, David Marshall (1956). Lives and legends of the Georgian saints. Mowbrays.
- Rapp, S.H. Jr. (2003). Studies in Medieval Georgian Historiography: Early Texts and Eurasian Contexts. Corpus Scriptorum Christianorum Orientalium. Vol. 113. Peeters. ISBN 978-90-429-1318-9.
- Thomson, Robert W. (1996). Rewriting Caucasian history: the medieval Armenian adaptation of the Georgian chronicles; the original Georgian texts and the Armenian adaptation. Oxford: Clarendon Press. ISBN 0-19-826373-2.
- Wardrop, Margery; Wardrop, J.O. (2006). "Life of St. Nino". In Margery Wardrop; Kirsopp Lake; G.H. Gwilliam; C.F. Rogers (eds.). Studies in Biblical and Patristic Criticism: Or Studia Biblica Et Ecclesiastica. Vol. 5. Gorgias Press. ISBN 1-59333-470-2.
