= Christianization of the Kingdom of Iberia =

Conversion of kingdom to Christianity

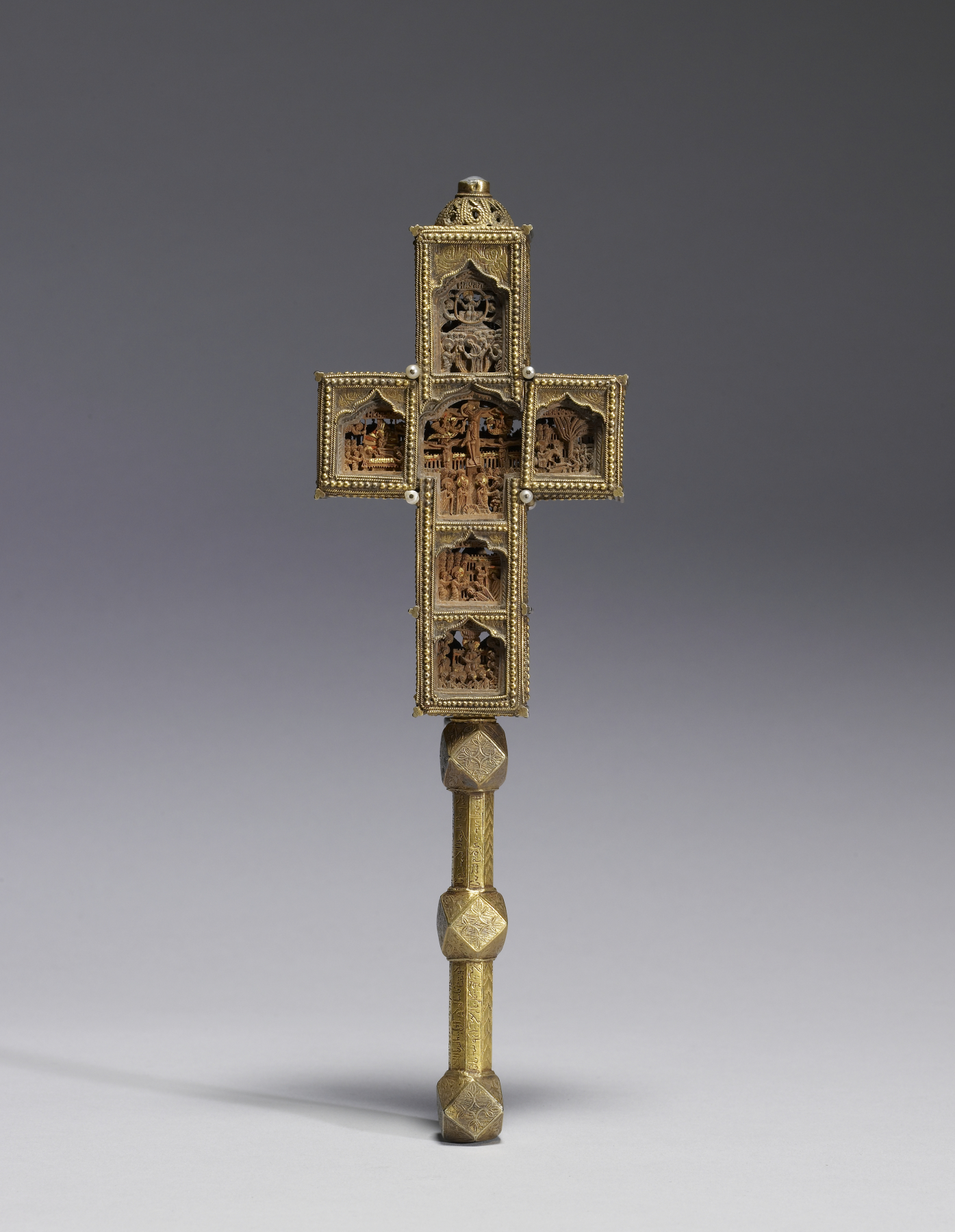
A benediction cross of Catholicos-Patriarch Domentius IV of Georgia showing scenes of the Triumphal Entry, Crucifixion and Ascension of Jesus, the Dormition of the Mother of God, the Raising of Lazarus, and Pentecost. In an inscription on the handle of the cross in the Georgian Mkhedruli script, the Catholicos-Patriarch asks for the "forgiveness of his sins" (kept at the Walters Art Museum in the United States).

The Christianization of the Kingdom of Iberia (Georgian: ქართლის სამეფოს გაქრისტიანება, romanized: kartlis samepos gakrist'ianeba) refers to the spread of Christianity in the early 4th century as a result of the preaching of Saint Nino in the ancient Georgian kingdom of Kartli, known as Iberia in classical antiquity. The then-pagan king of Iberia Mirian III declared Christianity to be the kingdom's state religion. According to Roman historian Sozomen, this led the king's "large and warlike barbarian nation to confess Christ and renounce the religion of their fathers", as the polytheistic Georgians had long-established anthropomorphic idols, known as the "Gods of Kartli". The king would become the main sponsor, architect, initiator and an organizing power of all building processes.

Per Socrates of Constantinople, the "Iberians first embraced the Christian faith" alongside the Abyssinians, but the exact date of the event is still debated. The kings of Georgia and Armenia were among the first monarchs anywhere in the world to convert to the Christian faith. Prior to the escalation of the Armeno-Georgian ecclesiastical rivalry and the Christological controversies, their Caucasian Christianity was extraordinarily inclusive, pluralistic and flexible that only saw the rigid ecclesiological hierarchies established much later, particularly as "national" churches crystallised from the 6th century. Despite the tremendous diversity of the region, the Christianization process was a pan-regional and a cross-cultural phenomenon in the Caucasus, Eurasia's most energetic and cosmopolitan zones throughout the late antiquity, hard enough to place Georgians and Armenians unequivocally within any one major civilization.

The Jews of Mtskheta, the royal capital of Kartli which played a significant role in the Christianization of the kingdom, gave a strong impetus to the deepening of ties between the Georgian monarchy and the Holy Land, leading to an increasing presence of Georgians in Palestine. This is confirmed by the activities of Peter the Iberian and other pilgrims, as well as the oldest attested Georgian Bir el Qutt inscriptions found in the Judaean Desert and the Georgian graffiti of Nazareth and Sinai.

Iberia was a factor in a competitive diplomacy of the Roman and Sasanian Empires, and on occasion became a major player in proxy wars between the two empires. The kingdom shared many institutions and concepts with the neighbouring Iranians, had been physically connected to the "Iranian Commonwealth" since the Achaemenid period through commerce, war or marriage. Its adoption of Christianity meant that King Mirian III made a cultural and historical choice with profound international implications, though his decision was not tied with Roman diplomatic initiatives. Iberia, architecturally and artistically rooted in Achaemenid culture, from its Hellenistic-era establishment to the conversion of the crown, embarked on a new multi-phased process that took centuries to complete, encompassing the entire 5th, 6th and early 7th centuries, resulting in the emergence of a strong Georgian identity.

On the eve of the historic Christianization, the king and the queen were quickly acculturated Georgianized foreigners, the physical fusion of Iranian and Greek cultures. Saint Nino was also a foreigner, as were the first two chief bishops of Kartli, who were Greeks sent by the Roman emperor Constantine the Great. It was only in the first half of the 6th century that native Georgians permanently seized the highest ecclesiastical posts. Nevertheless, outsiders such as Greeks, Iranians, Armenians and Syrians continued to play a prominent role in the administration of the Georgian church.

== Christianization by an apostle ==
Even though Iberia officially embraced Christianity in the early 4th century, the Georgian Orthodox Church claims apostolic origin and regards Andrew the Apostle as the founder of the Georgian church. This is also supported by some Byzantine sources. Ephrem Mtsire (11th century) later explained Saint Nino's role as Iberia's necessary "second Christening". Archaeological artefacts confirm the spread of Christianity before the conversion of King Mirian in the 4th century. Some of the third-century burials in Georgia include Christian objects such as signet rings with a cross and ichthys or anchor and fish, clearly attesting their Christian affiliation. These may mean that the upper-class Iberians had embraced Christianity much earlier than its "official Christianization" date.

== Christianization of the royal family ==
According to The Georgian Chronicles and the chronicle Conversion of Kartli, a Cappadocian woman Nino converted Queen Nana and later King Mirian III to Christianity, which led to the Christianization of the entire kingdom of Kartli and its people. The Greco-Roman historians Tyrannius Rufinus, Gelasius of Caesarea, Gelasius of Cyzicus, Theodoret, Socrates of Constantinople and Sozomen all have similar narratives of the Georgian tradition. The only major thing that differs in these Greco-Roman accounts from the Georgian tradition is Nino being an unnamed Roman captive who was brought to Iberia. According to Georgian sources, Nino was a daughter of Zabilon and Susana, a family endowed with a direct but unlikely link to Jerusalem. Once, when she went to Jerusalem to see her father, she asked if anyone knew where the Seamless Robe of Jesus was located. She was told that it was kept "in the eastern city of Mtskheta, a country of Kartli [i.e. Iberia]." She decided to go to Iberia and eventually reached the mountains of Javakheti in June, after four months of travel. She stayed for two days at the Paravani Lake and then continued her journey towards the royal city of Mtskheta. When she reached the capital, she found herself at the pagan holiday held for the god Armazi, with King Mirian taking part in the ceremony. Nino, shocked by the event, started to pray, resulting in "severe wind" that destroyed the pagan statue. Later, she was approached by the attendants of Queen Nana, who was suffering from a grave illness. She was asked to cure the queen. The queen was healed immediately, and Nino converted the queen to Christianity. Hearing about the queen's healing, the king was "very surprised". He initially opposed his wife's new religion until he, too, encountered a miracle one day while hunting, riding and "looking over Uplistsikhe" through the woods of Tkhoti mountain when he suddenly was surrounded by the threatening darkness of a solar eclipse.

და დაშთა მეფე მარტო, და იარებოდა მთათა და მაღნართა შეშინებული და შეძრწუნებული. დადგა ერთსა ადგილსა და წარეწირა სასოება ცხოვრებისა მისისა. და ვითარცა მოეგო თავსა თჳსსა ცნობასა, და განიზრახვიდა ესრეთ გულსა თჳსსა: "აჰა ესე რა, ვხადე ღმერთთა ჩემთა და არა ვპოვე ჩემ ზედა ლხინება. აწ, რომელსა იგი ქადაგებს ნინო ჯუარსა და ჯუარცმულსა და ჰყოფს კურნებასა, მისითა მოსავობითა, არამცა ძალ ედვაა ჴსნა ჩემი ამის ჭირისაგან? რამეთუ ვარ მე ცოცხლივ ჯოჯოხეთსა შინა და არა უწყი, თუ ყოვლისა ქუეყანისათჳს იქმნა დაქცევა ესე, ანუ თუ ჩემთჳს ოდენ იქმნა. აწ, თუ ოდენ ჩემთჳს არს ჭირი ესე, ღმერთო ნინოსო, განმინათლე ბნელი ესე და მიჩუენე საყოფელი ჩემი და აღვიარო სახელი შენი, და აღვმართო ძელი ჯუარისა და თაყუანისვცე მას და აღვაშენო სახლი სალოცველად ჩემდა, და ვიყო მორჩილ ნინოსა სჯულსა ზედა ჰრომთასა.
And the king got alone, and he walked over the hills and woods scared and terrified. He stood at one place and became desperate over his life. And when he recovered his consciousness, and decided to his heart: "So this is it, I had my god and found no joy. Let the one preached by Nino, the cross and the one that was crucified and does the healing, by his glory – isn't he powerful enough to save me from this trouble? As I am lively into a hell and I don't know, how the whole world was this destroyed, or is it just for me. Let, if this is only for me to be in trouble like this, O God of Nino, enlighten the darkness and show me the place of mine and I will recognize your name, and will erect a pillar of Cross and will respect it and will build a house for me to pray, and will be obedient to Nino's faith of Rome.

When at last, he called Christ, his wife's new God, for help – the daylight immediately returned. The king jumped down from the horse, raised his hands up to the "eastern sky" and said:

შენ ხარ ღმერთი ყოველთა ზედა ღმერთთა და უფალი ყოველთა ზედა უფალთა, ღმერთი, რომელსა ნინო იტყჳს.
You are the God over all the other Gods and Lord over all the other Lords, God, who is proclaimed by Nino.

After saying this, the king promised again to the new God to erect "a pillar of the Cross". The king safely returned to the capital and was greeted by his "queen and the entire nation" of Kartli. He went with his army to see Nino. At the urging of Nino, the king laid the foundations of a church to commemorate his new faith, Christianity. According to the Armenian historian Movses Khorenatsi, after Mirian's conversion, Nino "destroyed the image of Armazi, the god of thunder". When the church was completed, the king sent ambassadors to the emperor Constantine the Great requesting that he send clergy to help establish the faith in the kingdom. Per Sozomen, upon hearing the news of the conversion of Iberia, "the emperor of the Romans was delighted, acceding to every request that was proffered."

The foundation of the Georgian Church and the spread of the new religion in Kartli were made possible mostly by the activities of the kings and the aristocracy. King Mirian's main church-building activity in Mtskheta saw the construction of the Svetitskhoveli Cathedral, according to the Georgian tradition connected with the Seamless Robe of Jesus, brought by a pious Jew named Elias, an eyewitness of the Crucifixion of Jesus, to Mtskheta from Jerusalem in the first century. The Samtavro Monastery, the king's own sepulchre church, was built outside the city, however. This is reminiscent of the situation of the church buildings of Constantine the Great and his family outside of the Roman pomerium. But the sepulchre of the first Christian Georgian king was located inside the church, whereas the sepulchres for the members of the Constantinian dynasty were located in a separate imperial mausoleum near the church. Also, the Constantinian churches were devoted to the cult of Christian martyrs, whereas the early Georgian church had no martyrs.

After the Christianization of the monarchy, the Georgians intensified their contacts with the Holy Land. Pre-Christian Iberia had a Jewish community as early as the times of Nebuchadnezzar II, and there were close and deep connections in the Iberian ideology of the sacred with the holiness of Jerusalem. This Iberian fascination with Jerusalem and Zion largely predates the claims of Georgia's unprecedented "Byzantinizing" Bagrationi monarchs to have descended directly from King David. Iberia, by having a direct connection to Jerusalem, had several monasteries there already. It was in Jerusalem that Rufinus met Bacurius, and by the end of the fourth century a Georgian monastery was founded there. During the reign of Vakhtang I, the Georgian hero-king, the head of the Georgian church received the rank of Catholicos, and the Georgian church was recognized as autocephalous by the Church of Antioch.

== Christianization of the countryside ==
Despite the royal enthusiasm for the new religion, and its adoption within court circles, Christianity took root slowly in the rural districts of the kingdom. Nino and her entourage met hostility from highlanders inhabiting the southeastern slopes of the Caucasus Mountains, but ultimately, they were persuaded to surrender their idols. Resistance also arose within the Jewish community of Mtskheta. The first steps in the Christianization of Iberia's countryside occurred in the late fifth and early sixth centuries, when indigenous monastic traditions took deep root and facilitated the spread of Christianity into the more peripheral regions of Kartli. Sometime in the 530s or 540s, the Thirteen Assyrian Fathers arrived in Mtskheta, whose activities would result in the establishment of some sixteen monasteries and other churches across Georgia, many of whose sixth-century foundations still can be observed today.

== Christianization date ==
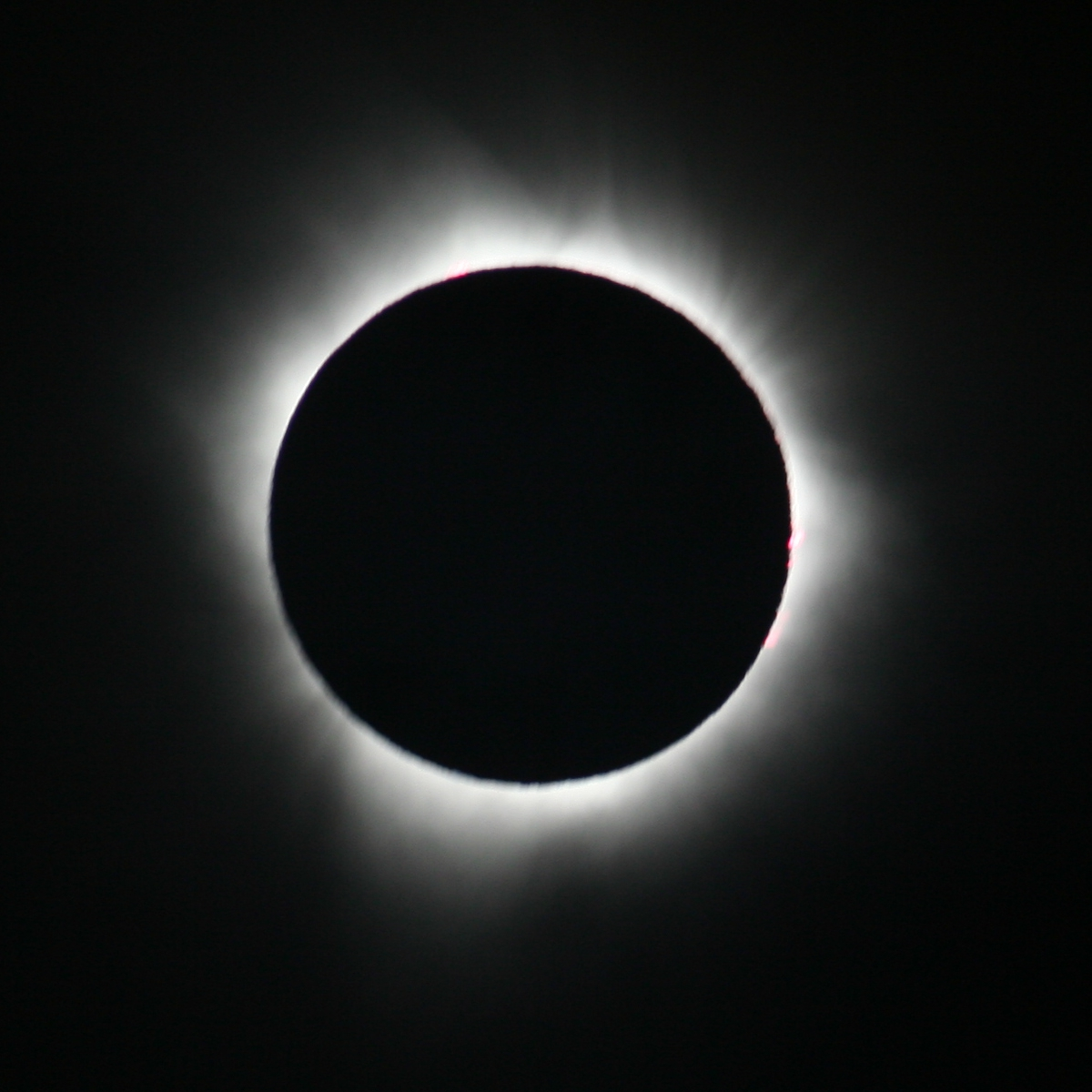
Solar eclipse of 11 July 2010, totality seen from the French Polynesia.

Estimates of the conversion date by historians have ranged over much of King Mirian's long reign. Foreign and Georgian scholars' proposed dates are the following: AD 312, 317, 318, 320, 323, 325/6/7/8, 330/1/2/3/4/5/6/7. Once widely accepted AD 337 for Iberia's conversion, is favoured nowadays by many scholars to be AD 326, possibly a "third Sunday after Easter" per John Zosimus, that was on 1 May, the year traditionally held by the Georgian Orthodox Church.

Apart from the historians, Iberia's conversion is of greater interest during decades of debates, to the astronomy scholars – who maintain that there is a high possibility that the total solar eclipse of AD 319, 6 May is the exact date of the Georgian conversion, an eclipse that reached eastern Georgia, and this "eclipse hypothesis" is not new. An eclipse per model ΔT≈7500 with solar azimuth angle being about 290° would make king and his fellow hunters – or royal entourage – witness the totality of it, but not the townspeople nearby. The visibility conditions for the king on the Tkhoti mountain could have been similar to the Solar eclipse of 11 July 2010 as seen at sunset from the mountainous terrain of Patagonia. During the eclipse of AD 319, observers at lower elevations near Mtskheta, would have seen the sky grow prematurely dark and then slightly brighter, without the Sun reappearing over the horizon. At higher elevations nearby such as where the king might have been, totality of an eclipse may indeed have been a remarkable sight. L. V. Morrison and F. R. Stephenson according to their geophysical model ΔT≈7450±180°, do not contradict this scenario and an intriguing possibility, but it remains an open question whether the ancient and medieval written accounts are trustworthy and really based on actual facts.

According to The Georgian Chronicles it was "one day of Summer, July 20, a Saturday."

== See also ==
- Christianization of Armenia
- Constantine the Great and Christianity
- Christianity as the Roman state religion
- Timeline of official adoptions of Christianity

== Notes ==
1. Georgian historiography refers to the event as the Conversion of Kartli (Georgian: მოქცევაჲ ქართლისაჲ, romanized: moktsevay kartlisay), just like the chronicle.
2. Rufinus relied on Bacurius the Iberian, a Georgian prince or "little king" and a principal commander of emperor Theodosius I, as one of his sources for the Georgian conversion to Christianity.
3. In October 2026, Georgia officially celebrated 1700th anniversary of the proclamation of Christianity as the state religion in the country.

== Bibliography ==
- Georgian Chronicles, Conversion of King Mirian and with him All of the Kartli by Our Saint Mother and Apostle Nino, Part No. 30
- Plontke-Lüning, A. (2011) Narratives about Early Church Buildings in Armenia and Georgia, Moscow State University
- Haas, C. (2014) Geopolitics and Georgian Identity in Late Antiquity: The Dangerous World of Vakhtang Gorgasali, Brill Publishers
- Haas, C. (2008) Mountain Constantines: The Christianization of Aksum and Iberia, Journal of Late Antiquity 1.1, Johns Hopkins University Press
- Suny, R. G. (1994) The Making of the Georgian Nation, Indiana University Press
- Mgaloblishvili, T. (2014) Ancient Christianity in the Caucasus, Routledge
- Rapp, S. H. Jr. (2016) The Sasanian World Through Georgian Eyes, Caucasia and the Iranian Commonwealth in Late Antique Georgian Literature, Sam Houston State University, USA, Routledge
- Rapp, S. H. Jr. (2014) New Perspectives on "The Land of Heroes and Giants": The Georgian Sources for Sasanian History, Sam Houston State University
- Rapp, S. H. Jr. & Mgaloblishvili, T. (2011) Manichaeism in Late Antique Georgia? Chapter 17, University of Oklahoma
- Sauter, J. Simonia, I. Stephenson, F. R. & Orchiston, W. (2015) The Legendary Fourth-Century Total Solar Eclipse in Georgia: Fact or Fantasy? Springer Publishing
- Schaff, P. (2007) Nicene and Post-Nicene Fathers: Second Series Volume II Socrates, Sozomenus
