= Gabriel Urgebadze =

Georgian Orthodox saint (1929–1995)

Saint Gabriel of Georgia
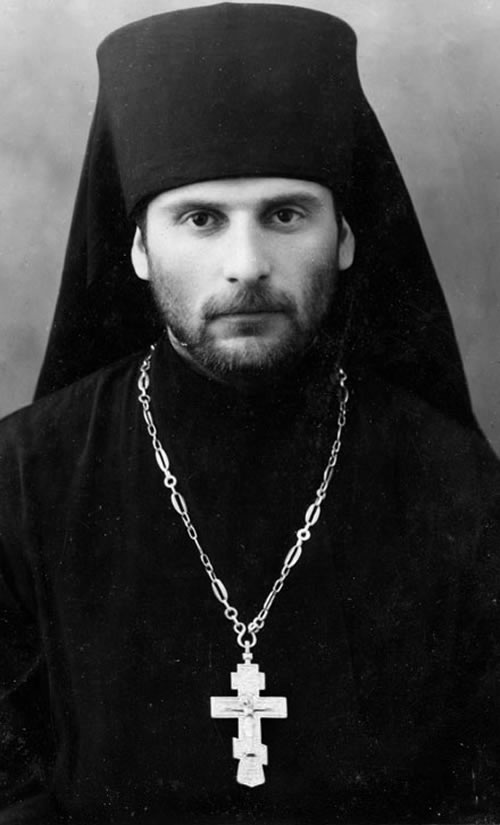

Archimandrite Venerable Confessor and Fool for Christ
- Born: Goderdzi Urgebadze; 26 August 1929; Tbilisi, Georgian Soviet Socialist Republic
- Died: 2 November 1995 (aged 66); Mtskheta, Georgia
- Venerated in: Eastern Orthodox Church
- Canonized: 20 December 2012 by the Holy Synod of the Patriarchate of Georgia
- Major shrine: Samtavro Monastery, Mtskheta, Georgia
- Feast: 20 October [O.S. 2 November]
- Attributes: Monastic habit Pectoral cross Prayer rope Cane
- Patronage: Georgia

Gabriel of Georgia (Georgian: წმიდა გაბრიელ ქართველი, romanized: ts'mida gabriel kartveli), born Goderdzi Urgebadze (გოდერძი ურგებაძე; 26 August 1929 – 2 November 1995) was a Georgian Orthodox monk venerated for his dedicated monastic life and piety. With many miracles ascribed to him, Gabriel's grave in Mtskheta has attracted an increasing number of pilgrims. The Georgian Orthodox Church officially canonized him as Holy Father Saint Gabriel, Confessor and Fool for Christ (წმ. ღირსი მამა გაბრიელი აღმსარებელი-სალოსი; Ts'm. ghirs mama gabrieli aghmsarebeli-salosi), on 20 December 2012.

== Biography ==
=== Early years ===
Goderdzi Urgebadze was born in Tiflis on 26 August 1929. He was baptized in infancy at the Church of Great Martyr Barbara in Navtlugi. His father, Vasili Urgebadze, died under unclear circumstances when Goderdzi was two years old; thereafter, he was called "Vasiko" within the family in his father's memory. He began schooling at the age of six and reportedly first encountered the name of Christ at the age of seven. During this period, he saved money and purchased a Gospel.

During the period of communist persecution, religious icons were often hidden in attics and other concealed places. Goderdzi requested that such icons be given to him when they were no longer needed. These icons are now preserved in the church he built, as well as in the tower of the women’s monastery of Samtavro. His mother, Varvara Urgebadze, though not irreligious, initially opposed his religious vocation. She later became a nun under the name Anna and is buried in the courtyard of Samtavro Monastery alongside her son. Due to maternal opposition, he left his family home and undertook pilgrimages to several monasteries, including Samtavro, Svetitskhoveli, Shio-Mgvime, Zedazeni, and Betania, which became his principal spiritual influence.

Following his graduation from school, he was conscripted into the Soviet Army in 1949. While stationed in Batumi, he secretly fasted and attended services at St. Nicholas Church.

After his discharge in the 1950s, he devoted himself more seriously to spiritual life. In the courtyard of his family home, he built a small hut where he lived and prayed in solitude. He also attended services at the Sioni Cathedral. With the blessing of Catholicos-Patriarch Melchizedek III, he was initially employed as a watchman and later as a psalm-reader.

=== Beginning of monasticism ===
In January 1955, Goderdzi Urgebadze was ordained a deacon. On 23 February of the same year, at Motsameta Monastery in Kutaisi, he received monastic tonsure, taking the name Gabriel in honor of Gabriel the Iberian. On 26 February 1955, at the Cathedral of Saints Peter and Paul, Bishop Gabriel Chachanidze ordained him a hieromonk. From 1955 to 1960, he served at Sioni Cathedral, and subsequently from 1960 to 1962 at Betania Monastery, alongside his spiritual father George Mkheidze and Hieromonk Vasil Pirtskhalava.

Following the deaths of Hieromonk Vasil and Father George in 1962, Betania Monastery was closed by the authorities. Father Gabriel returned to Tbilisi, where he completed the construction of a seven-domed house-church in the yard of his family residence. From 1962 to 1965, he served at the Old Trinity Church of Tbilisi.

=== Protest against Soviet power ===
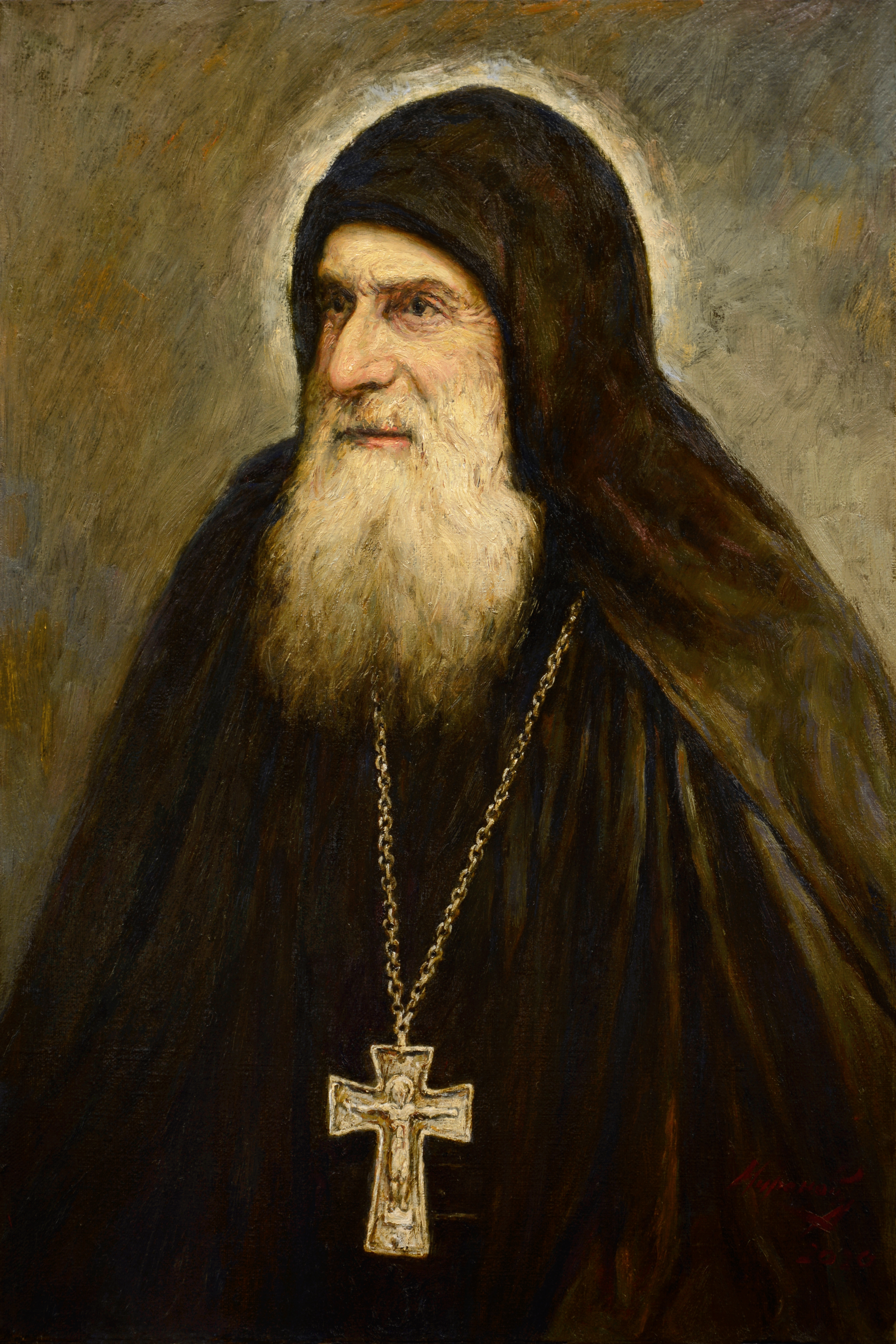
Saint Gabriel of Georgia painted by Andrey Mironov, c. 2020

On 1 May 1965, during the May Day demonstration, Hieromonk Gabriel set fire to a large portrait of Lenin. The incident was later reported in the Western Orthodox publication Death to the World in 1994.

He addressed the crowd with the following statement:

No glory should be given to this deceased man, but glory to Christ, who conquered death and bestowed upon us eternal life.

He was subsequently severely beaten by the crowd. A high-level emergency response was declared, and he was saved from possible death through the intervention of servicemen.

He was arrested in a severely injured state, suffering a broken jaw and multiple fractures, and taken to a KGB isolation facility. Investigators attempted to coerce him into confessing that the act had been ordered by church authorities, promising leniency in exchange. He refused and again referred to Lenin as a "beast", for which he was further beaten.

The incident attracted international attention and was reported in European and American newspapers. Instead of execution, he was committed to a psychiatric hospital in August 1965 and released three months later, partly due to the intervention of academician Avlipi Zurabashvili.

Although he retained the rank of Priest, he was prohibited from performing liturgical service. He continued to attend services as a lay participant and received communion as an ordinary believer. He was repeatedly summoned by the KGB and subjected to physical abuse. During this period, he adopted the lifestyle of a fool-for-Christ, engaging in unconventional public behavior and open street preaching.

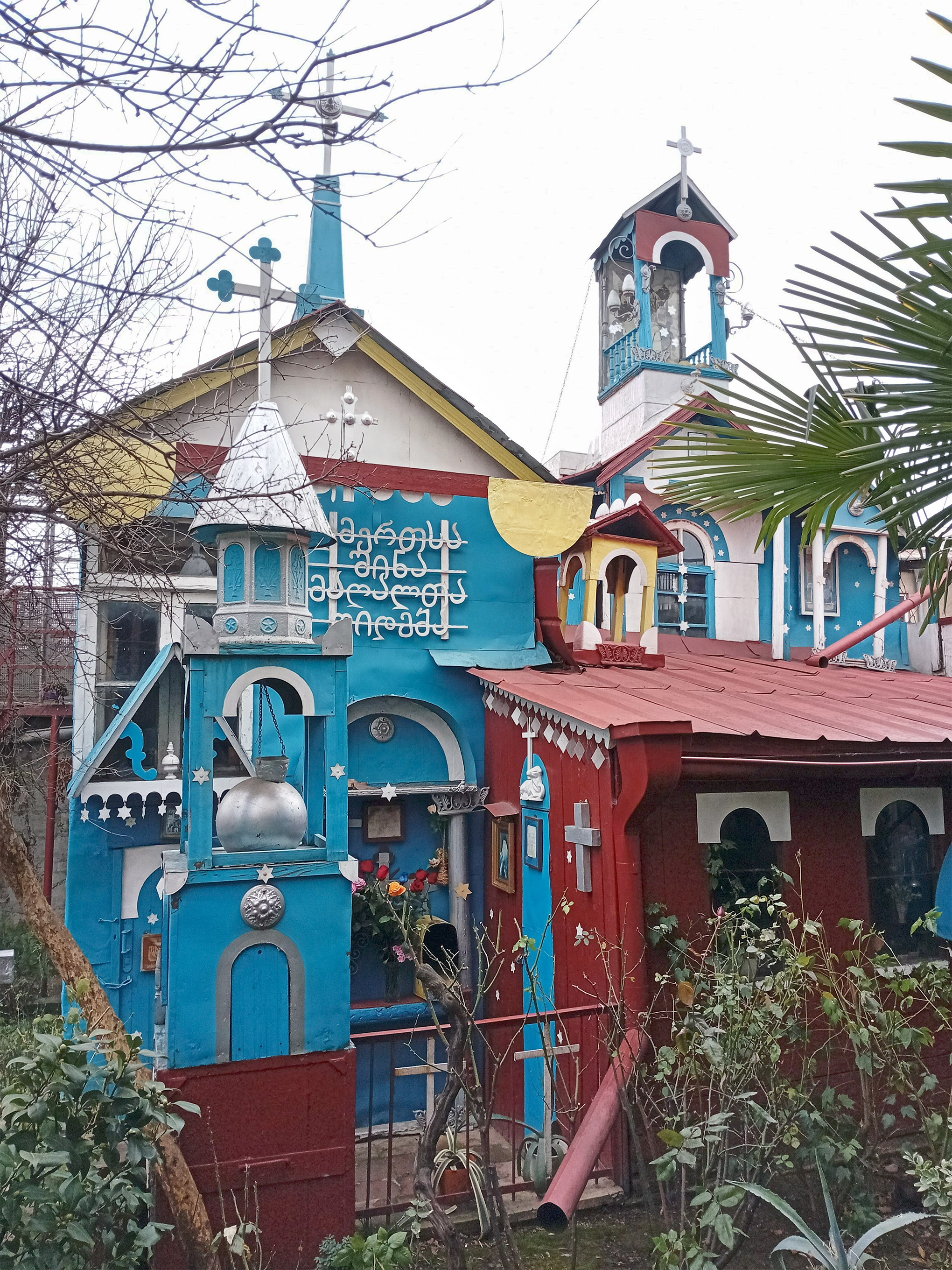
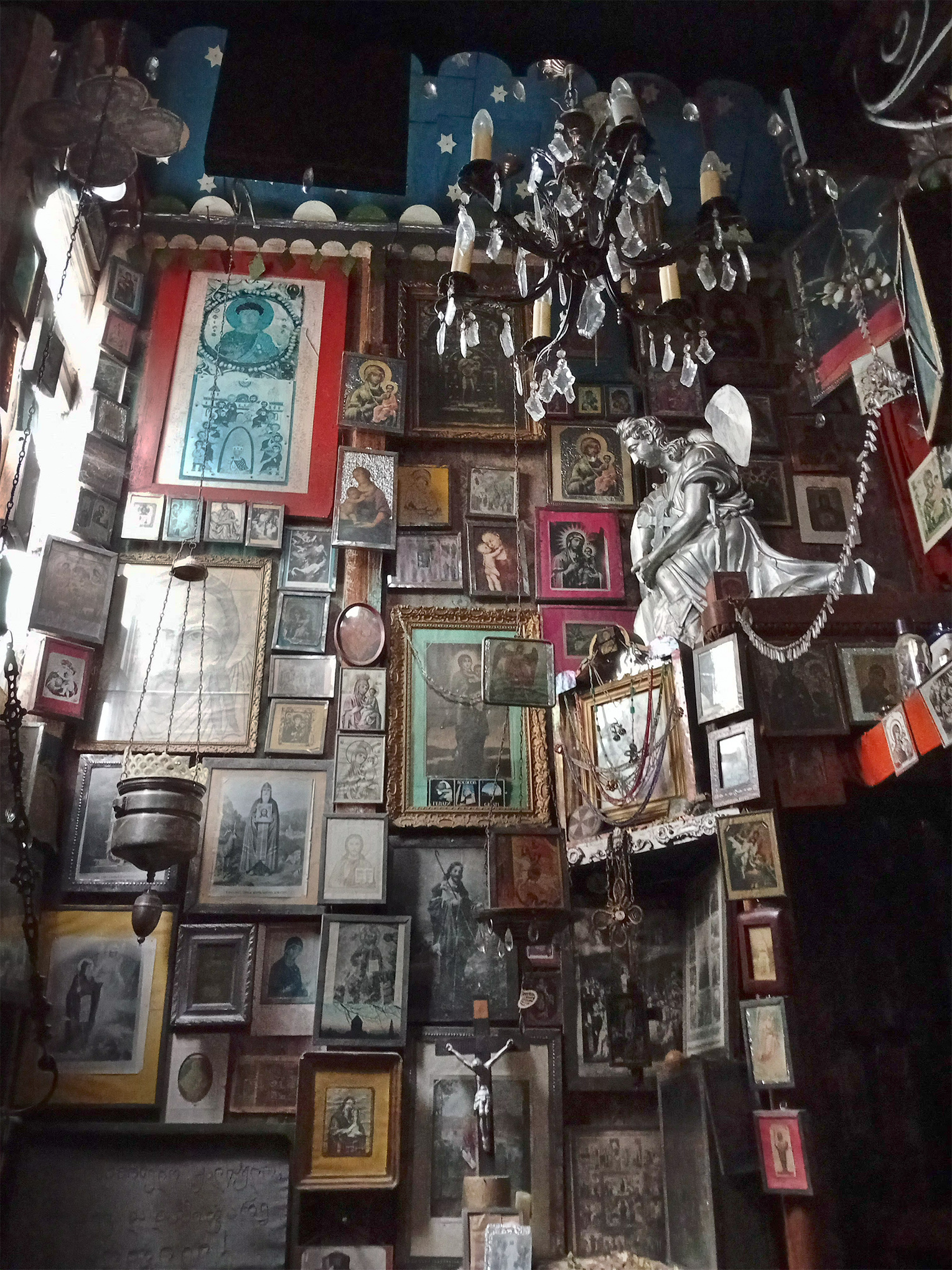
The surviving church built by Father Gabriel (11 Gia Bakarashvili Street, Tbilisi) and its interior, featuring objects collected by him from various demolished churches across Georgia.

In 1969, authorities demolished the small church he had constructed; however, he rebuilt it with a single dome.

=== Later years ===
In 1971, by decision of Catholicos-Patriarch Ephraim II and Metropolitan Ilia II (later Catholicos-Patriarch of all Georgia), Gabriel was appointed abbot of the women’s Samtavro Monastery and its seminary. He lived in the monastery tower. Between 1972 and 1990, he made pilgrimages to monasteries and churches abandoned or closed during the Soviet period.

In 1987, he moved from the tower to a small wooden hut formerly used as a chicken coop, where he lived through harsh winters without heating as an ascetic discipline. Once, he saw an angel of God in a vision, who revealed to him the location of a fragment of the Holy Cross of Svetitskhoveli and precisely indicated where this sacred relic was kept. Gabriel, together with the nuns of the monastery, later recovered the holy fragment from its hidden place. Today, this relic is kept at the Samtavro Monastery.

In 1990, he sought greater solitude at the Shio-Mgvime Monastery, but a vision from God instructed him to return to Samtavro, where he remained in his cell in the old tower until his death.

Shortly before his death, he developed dropsy, and after breaking his leg he was bedridden for a year and a half. Despite severe pain, he occasionally came outside to sit near the church. In his final years he preached love, repentance, humility, and kindness. The day before his death he foretold his passing. He died on 2 November 1995. He was buried according to ancient monastic custom— without a coffin, in a simple shroud—in the courtyard of Samtavro Monastery in Mtskheta. His grave bears the inscription: "Truth is in the immortality of the spirit".

== Veneration ==
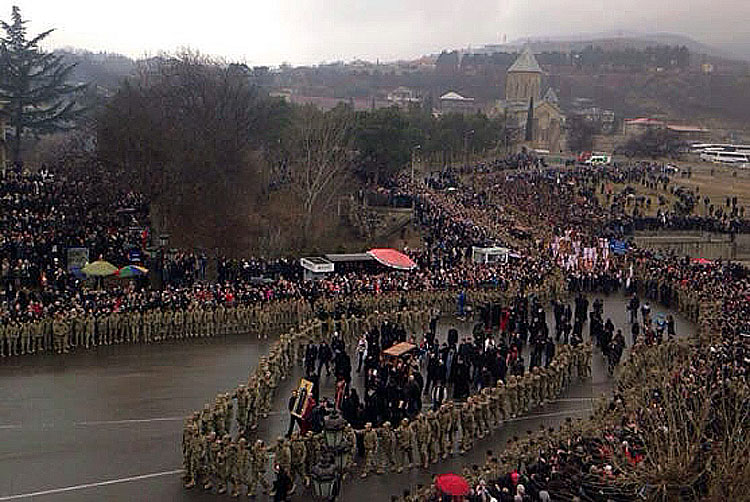
Uncovering of the relics of Saint Gabriel, Samtavro Monastery, February 22, 2014

The hieromonk Gabriel is believed by Eastern Orthodox Christians to have possessed powers of healing and clairvoyance, while his remains are considered incorrupt. The oil from a lamp which constantly burned at his tomb in Mtskheta is also considered miraculous. His grave became an increasingly popular pilgrimage site, and in 2012, the Holy Synod of the Georgian Orthodox Church officially recognized him as a saint.

In January 2014 rumours spread that Gabriel, in a supposed apparition to a nun in Mtskheta, had promised that two wishes will be granted to those visiting his tomb just before Christmas on 7 January. This sparked several mass gatherings at Samtavro, requiring extra police units to be deployed to control traffic. Church officials and the alleged seer-nun later dismissed the visions as false.

The relics of Gabriel were exhumed for reburial in a special crypt within Samtavro Monastery on 22 February 2014. Prior to its reburial, his body was toured around four major Orthodox cathedrals in Georgia, attracting thousands of devotees from all over the country. An akathist prayer to St. Gabriel has been composed and published in English.

== See also ==
- List of Eastern Orthodox saints
