= Bodbe Monastery =

Georgian Orthodox monastery near Sighnaghi, Georgia

Bodbe Monastery ბოდბის მონასტერი
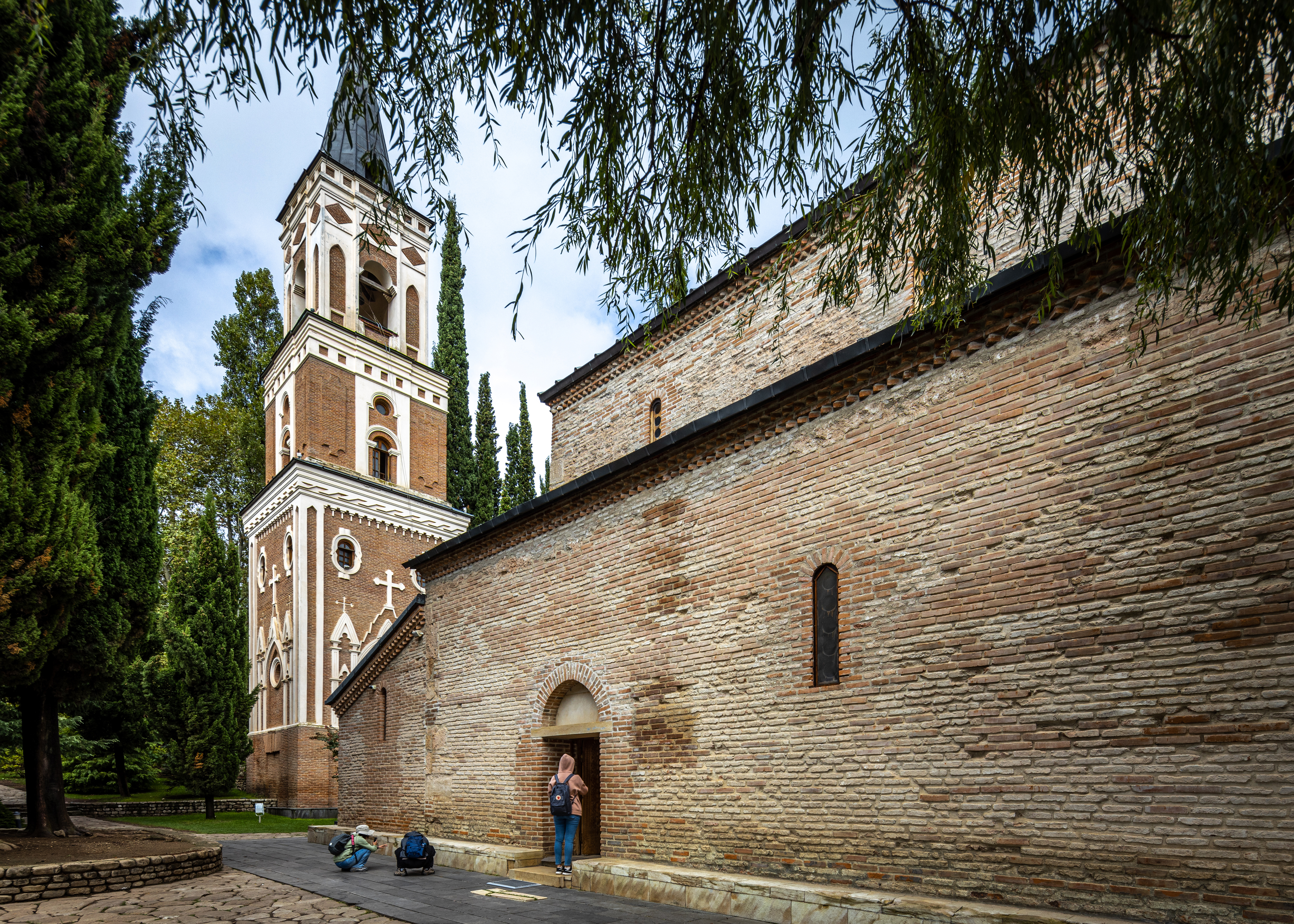
- Bodbe Monastery in September 2023

- Location within Georgia

Religion
- Affiliation: Georgian Orthodox Church
- Region: Caucasus

Location
- Location: 2 km from Sighnaghi, Kakheti Province (Mkhare), Georgia
- Coordinates: 41.6066°N 45.9334°E

Architecture
- Completed: 17th century

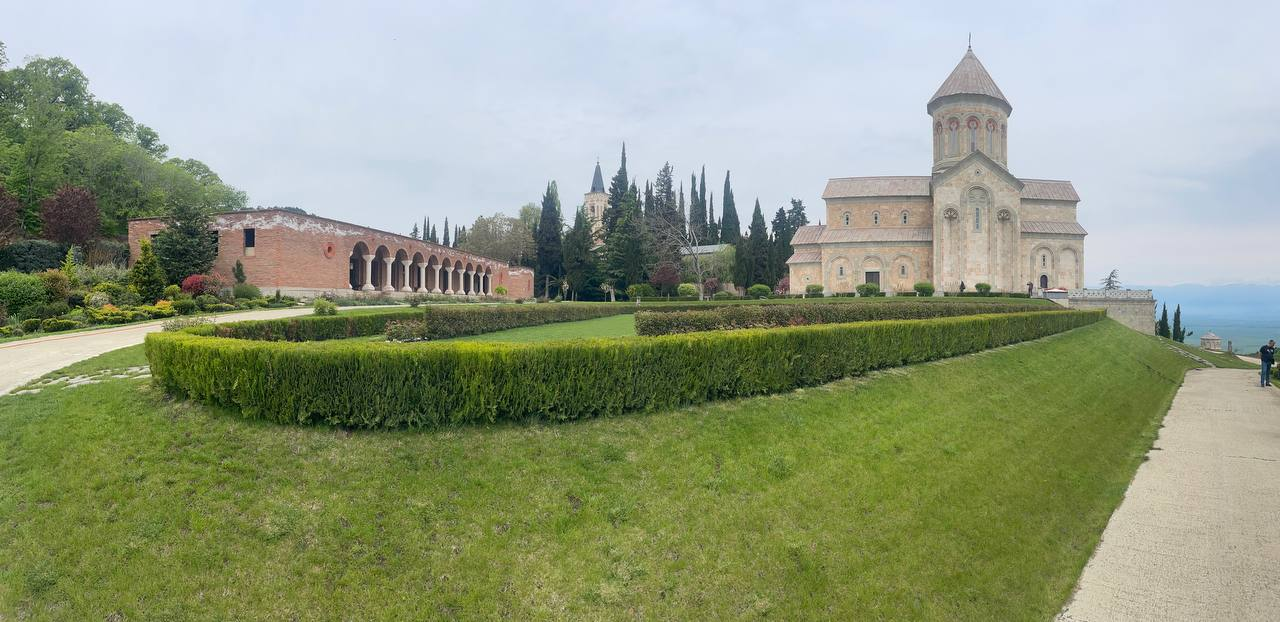
Bodbe Monastery in 2025

The Monastery of St. Nino at Bodbe (Georgian: ბოდბის წმინდა ნინოს მონასტერი, bodbis ts’minda Ninos monasteri) is a Georgian Orthodox monastic complex and the seat of the Bishops of Bodbe located 2 km from the town of Sighnaghi, Kakheti, Georgia. Originally built in the 9th century, it has been significantly remodeled, especially in the 17th century. The monastery now functions as a nunnery and is one of the major pilgrimage sites in Georgia, due to its association with St. Nino, the 4th-century female evangelist of Georgians, whose relics are shrined there.

== Landscape and architecture ==
The Bodbe Monastery is nested among tall Cypress trees on a steep hillside overlooking the Alazani Valley, where it commands views of the Greater Caucasus mountains.

The extant church – a three-nave basilica with three protruding apses – was originally built between the 9th and 11th centuries, but has been significantly modified since then. Both exterior and interior walls have been plastered and bear the traces of restoration carried out in the 17th and 19th centuries. It consists of a small hall church with an apse built over St. Nino's grave that is integrated into a larger aisled basilica. A free-standing three-storey bell-tower was erected between 1862 and 1885. Part of the 17th-century wall surrounding the basilica was demolished and the earlier original one restored in 2003.

Some 3 km from the convent, a small Chapel of St. Zabulon and St. Sosana was constructed, in the 1990s, to house a St. Nino's Spring, which, according to a local legend, emerged through Nino's prayers and is believed to have a healing power.

== History ==
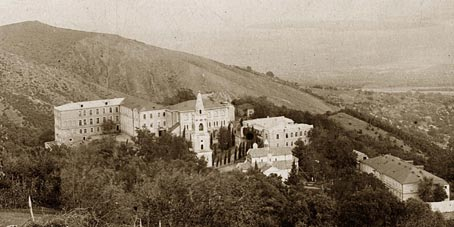
Bodbe Monastery in 1905

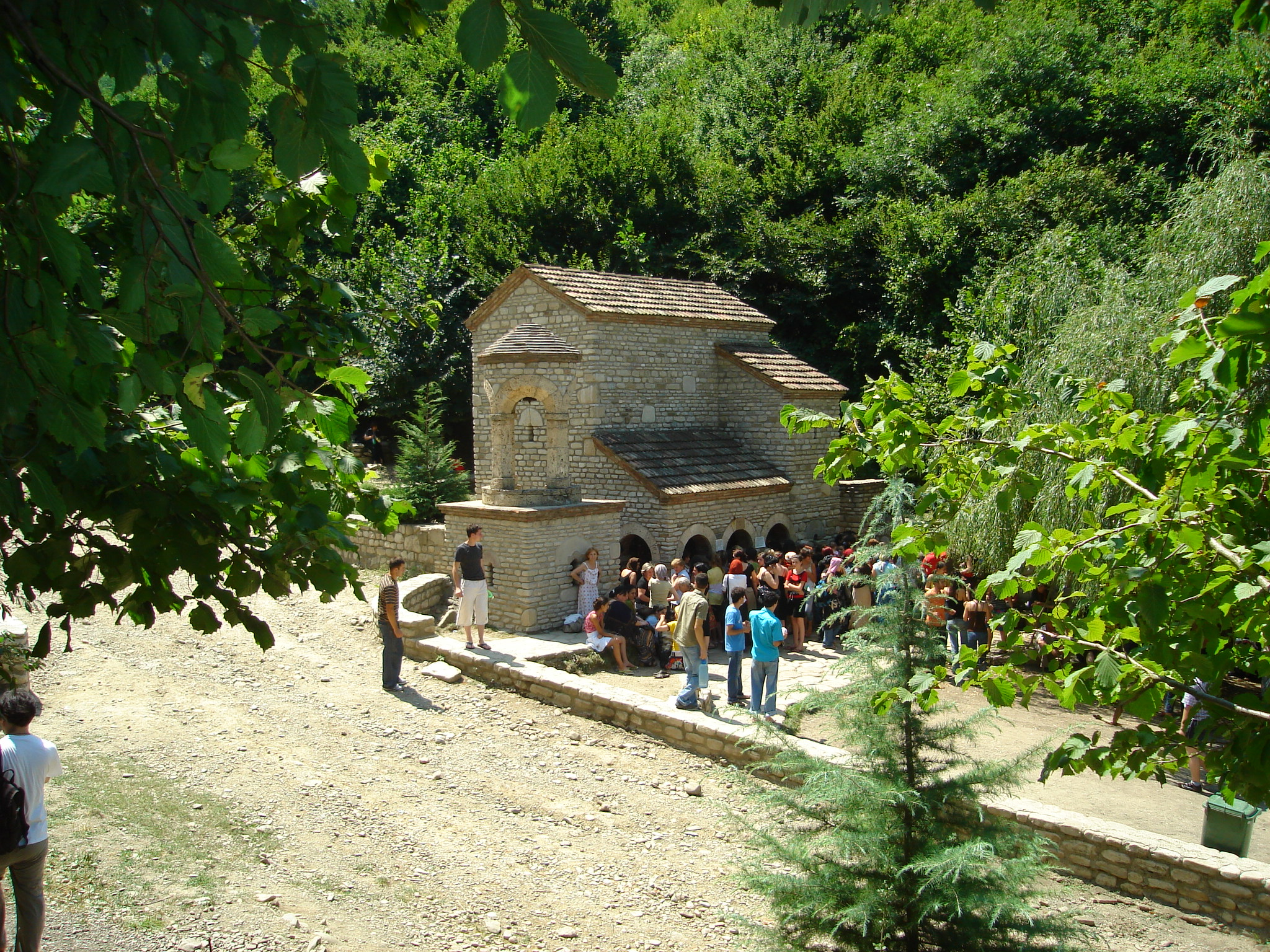
Pilgrims at the St. Nino Spring.

According to Georgian tradition, St. Nino, having witnessed the conversion of Georgians to the Christian faith, withdrew to the Bodbe gorge, in Kakheti, where she died c. 338–340. At the behest of King Mirian III (r. 284–361), a small monastery was built at the place where Nino was buried. The monastery gained particular prominence in the late Middle Ages. It was particularly favored by the kings of Kakheti who made choice of the monastery as the place of their coronation. Pillaged by the troops of Shah Abbas I of Persia in 1615, the Bodbe monastery was restored by King Teimuraz I of Kakheti (r. 1605–1648). With the revival of monastic life in Bodbe, a theological school was opened. The monastery also operated one of the largest depositories of religious books in Georgia and was home to several religious writers and scribes.

After the annexation of Georgia by the Russian Empire (1801), the Bodbe monastery continued to flourish under Metropolitan John Maqashvili and enjoyed the patronage of Tsar Alexander I of Russia. In 1823, the monastery was repaired and adorned with murals. Upon John's death in 1837, the Russian Orthodox exarchate active in Georgia since 1810 abolished the convent and converted it into a parish church. In the following decades, the monastery went into disrepair, but, in the 1860s, Archimandrite Macarius (Batatashvili) began to restore the monastery and established a chanting school. The chapel housing St. Nino's relics were refurbished by Mikhail Sabinin in the 1880s. In 1889, Bodbe was visited by Tsar Alexander III of Russia who decreed to open a nunnery there. The resurrected convent also operated a school where needlework and painting was taught.

In 1924, the Soviet government closed down the monastery and converted it into a hospital. In 1991, after the dissolution of the Soviet Union, the Bodbe monastery was resumed as a convent. Restoration works were carried out between 1990 and 2000 and resumed in 2003.
