= Samtavro Monastery =

Georgian Orthodox Christian monastery complex

Coordinates: 41°50′47″N 44°43′03″E

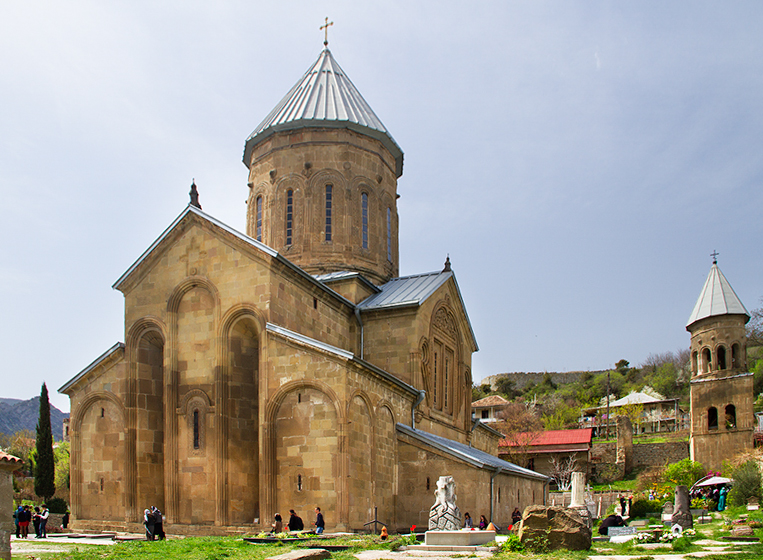
Samtavro Church

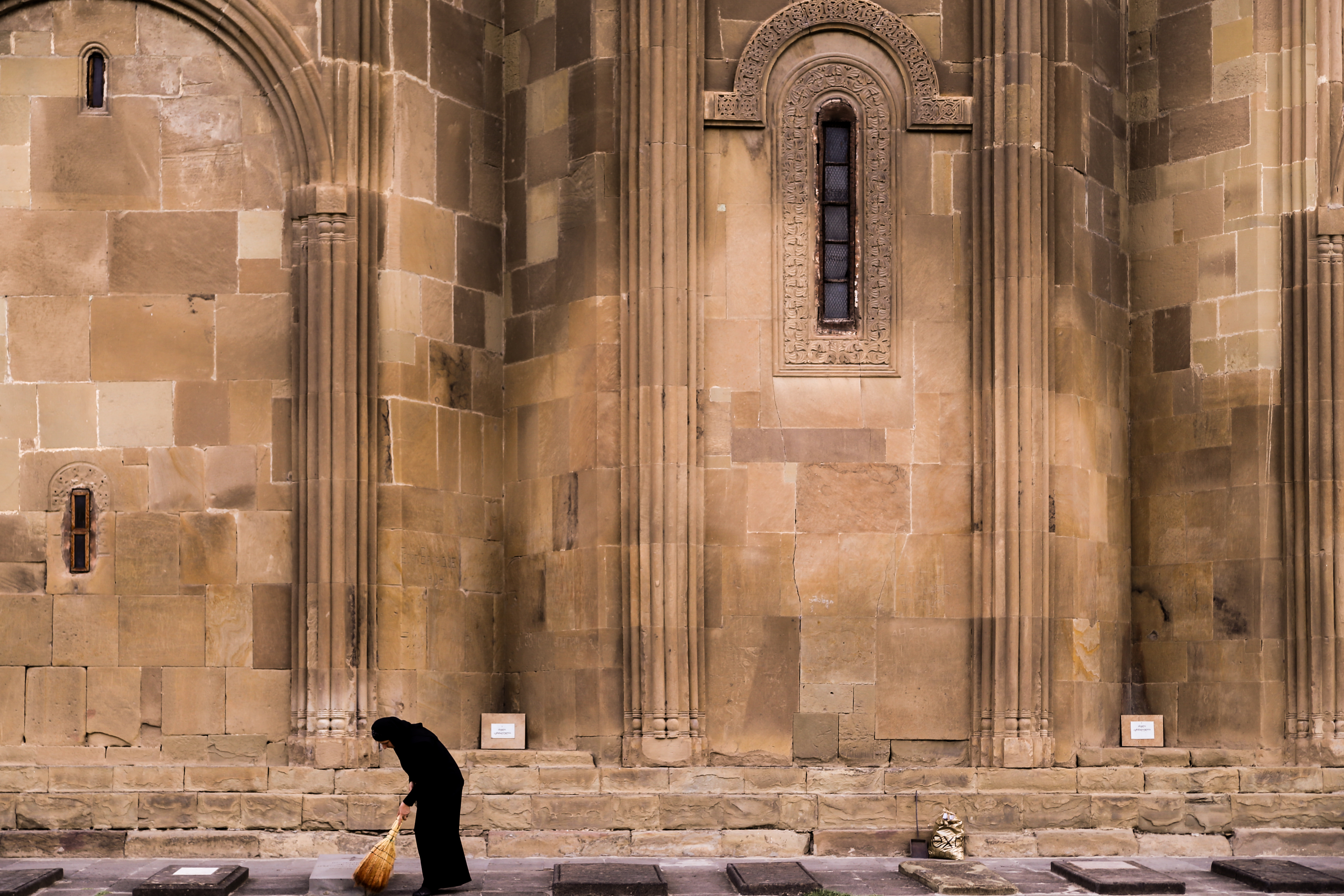
Nun takes care of tombs near the church

Samtavro Monastery (Georgian: სამთავროს მონასტერი) is a Georgian Orthodox Christian monastery complex that combines Samtavro Transfiguration Church and Nunnery of St. Nino in Mtskheta, Georgia. Built presumably in the 4th century by the King Mirian III, and reconstructed in the 11th century by the King George I and Catholicos-Patriarch Melchizedek I, Samtavro is an important Early and High Medieval historical and architectural monument, and was inscribed on the UNESCO World Heritage List in 1994 along other historical monuments in Mtskheta. Samtavro church is cross-in-square temple, with arches and other decorations typical for the 11th century Georgian architecture. The graves of Mirian III and the famous Georgian Saint monk Gabriel are located in the yard of Samtavro Church.

== History ==
The monastery was constructed in the northwestern part of the old town of Mtskheta. Unfortunately, no inscriptions remain to tell about its construction time. According to the Georgian hagiographic sources the monastery was established in the 4th century, during the reign of the King Mirian III of Iberia, when a small church was built here by Saint Nino in connection with conversion of Georgia in Christianity. Mirian and his wife Nana were buried in the monastery.

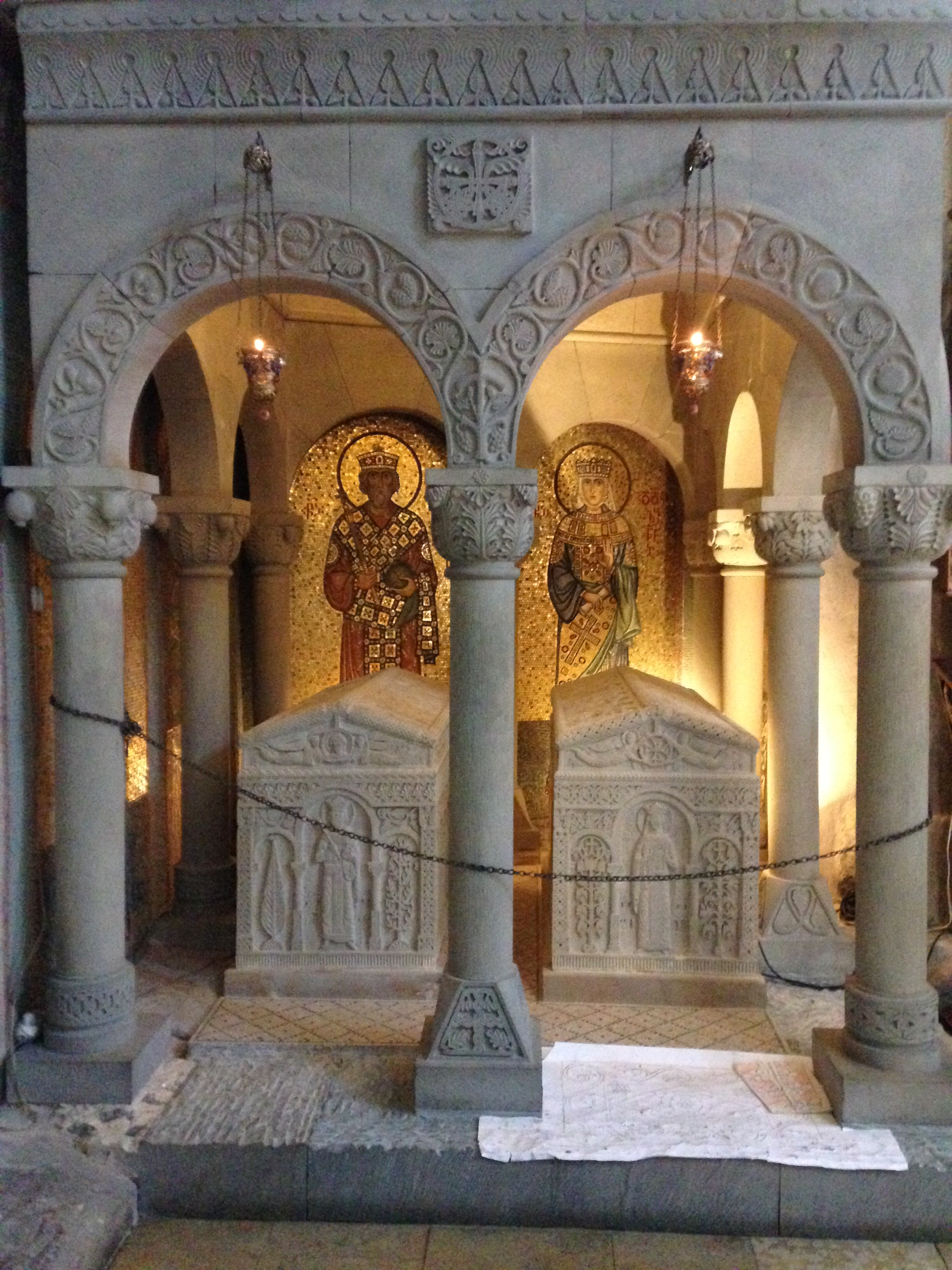
The tombs of Mirian and Nana

The name "Samtavro" can be translated from the Georgian language as "ruler's place", from Georgian: მთავარი, romanized: mtavari "ruler". The main temple is stylistically dated to the first half of the 11th century, and was probably built or rebuilt soon after Svetitskhoveli cathedral, with Catholicos-Patriarch Melchizedek I. Its dome was destroyed in 1283 by an earthquake, and restored some time between the end of 13th and the beginning of 14th century. From around the same time dates the altar iconostasis. Minor renovations have also been done for the facades. The wall, surrounding the monastery, was built in the Late Middle Ages, with the bell-tower added in 16th century. Original frescos did not survive, and the new were painted in 16-17th century. Other renovations were made in 17th century and later. The iconostasis, built of stone, was constructed in 18th century. Grave stones for the burials of Mirian and his wife Nana were made in 19th century.

== Architecture ==
Samtavro church is a typical example of a cross-in-square temple. Its dome rests on two pillars and the projecting walls of the altar apsidal. Being a later reconstruction, the dome does not fit into general proportions and the style of the 11th century. The church has two entrances: southern, with the portal, and western. The facades are made of yellow and brown stones. The portal, decorated in arches, also has rather fine ornamental carvings on plafonds. Open interior is well illuminated from windows, both on the dome and on all four walls of the church.

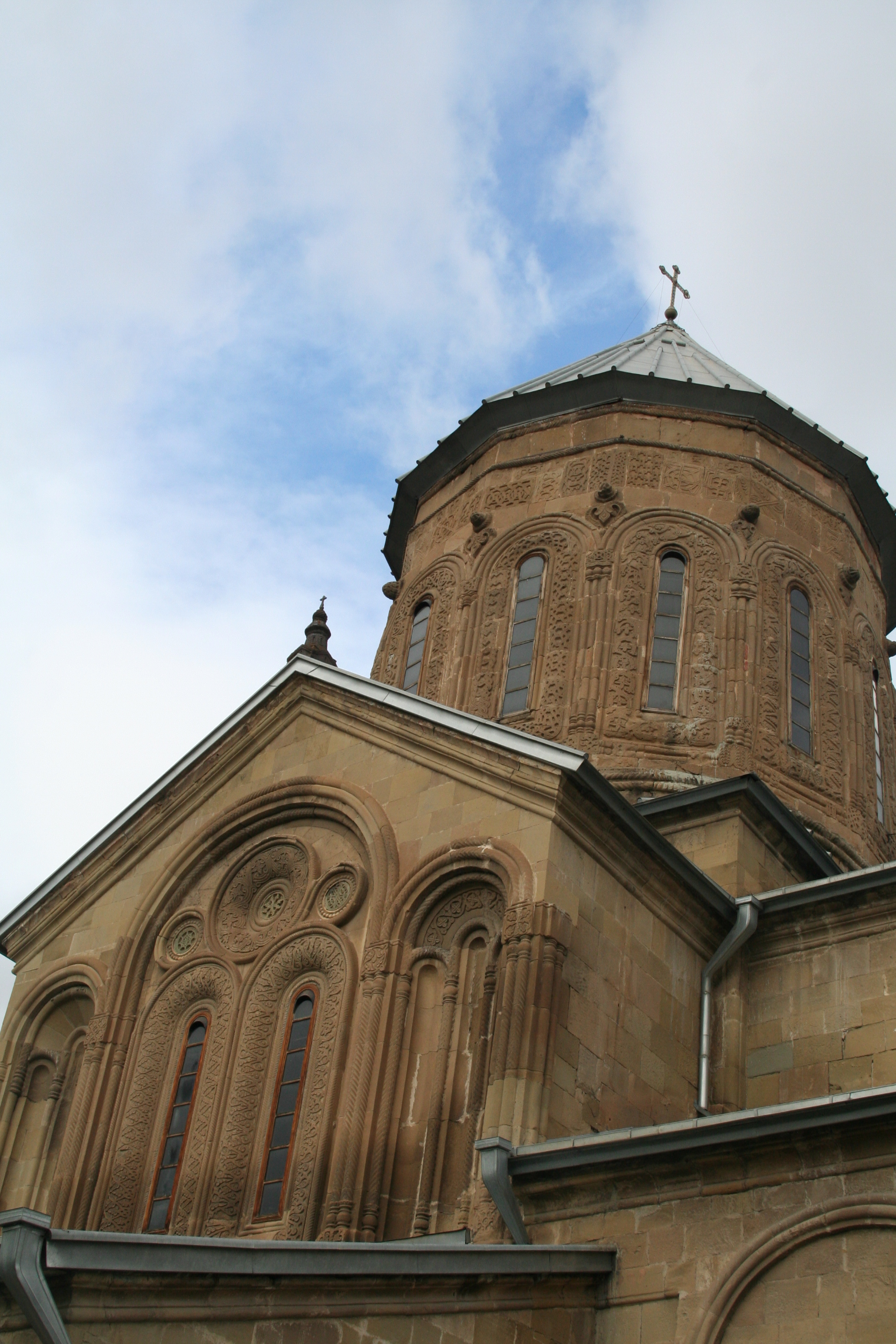
Decorations of the southern facade and the dome

In accordance with the standards of 11th century, putting accent on decorations, the facades are richly decorated, but variously, considering difference in the illumination. Such dualism is not common for that period. Accent was made on southern and northern facades. Decorations of the southern facade are rather fine, but rougher on the northern. The architect's idea was to express the effect of line movement. Eastern facade is more reserved. Most of the contrast here is created by triangular niches. Arches and windows have the signs of later alterations, including addition of the cross of the wall. Decorations of the western facade are even more simple. Portal here is more recent.

Fragments of frescos remain in the dome and altar.

Apart from the main temple, the monastery includes a small church, the bell-tower, a cylindrical tower, remnants of palace and some modern structures, all surrounded by the wall.

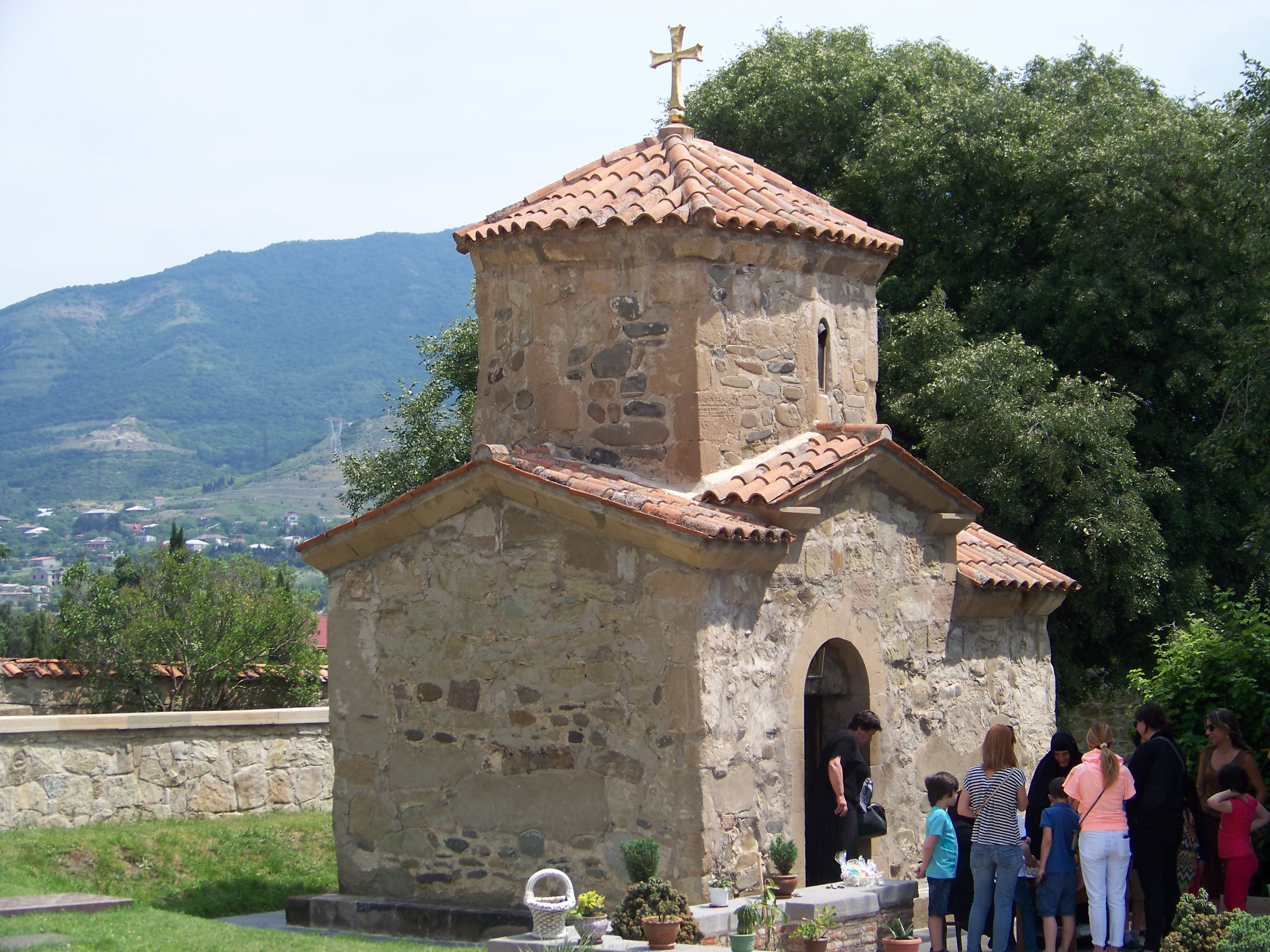
St. Nino's Church

The bell-tower, situated in the north-west corner of the wall, has three floors. The ground floor incorporates the entrance to the territory, the first floor was served both for observation and for living, and the second floor is an open belfry.

A small church, standing to right of the entrance, was rebuilt several times. It was said to be originally built by Saint Nino of Cappadocia, who converted Georgia into Christianity.

== Burials ==
The tombs of King Mirian III and his wife Nana, are found inside the church in the south-west part.

== See also ==
- Starets
- Monasticism
- Eastern Orthodox Church
