= Sauromaces II =

King of Iberia

King of Iberia
- Reign: 361–363, Diarchy 370–378
- Predecessor: Mirian III
- Successor: Aspacures II
- Dynasty: Chosroid dynasty
- Father: Rev II
- Mother: Salome of Ujarma

Sauromaces II (Georgian: საურმაგ II, romanized: saurmag II), of the Chosroid Dynasty, was a king (mepe) of Iberia (Kartli, eastern Georgia) from 361 to 363 and diarch from 370 to 378. He is ignored by the Georgian historic tradition, but mentioned by the 4th-century historian of the Roman Empire, Ammianus Marcellinus. He was the first son of Rev II and Salome and brother of Trdat of Iberia.

== Biography ==
Sauromaces seems to have succeeded on the death of his paternal grandfather, Mirian III, the first Christian king of Iberia, in 361 and pursued pro-Roman policy. In 363, he was ousted by the Sassanid king Shapur II who installed Aspacures II (Varaz-Bakur) in his place. Aspacures II was Sauromaces' paternal uncle. The Sassanid intervention in the Caucasus eventually drew a Roman response and, later in 370, Roman Emperor Valens sent in the twelfth legions—about 12,000 men—under Terentius who restored Sauromaces in the western provinces of Iberia adjoining Armenia and Lazica, while Aspacures' successor Mihrdat III was permitted to retain control of the northeastern part of the kingdom. The deal was not recognized by Shapur, who regarded it as grounds for war, and resumed hostilities against Rome early in 371. By 378, however, the Gothic War had constrained Rome to abandon Sauromaces; his realm must have ceased to exist as Iberia passed, whole or nearly so, under the Sassanid suzerainty.

Preceded by Mirian III	King of Iberia; 361–363; Diarch 370–378	Succeeded by Mihrdat III
