= Rev II =

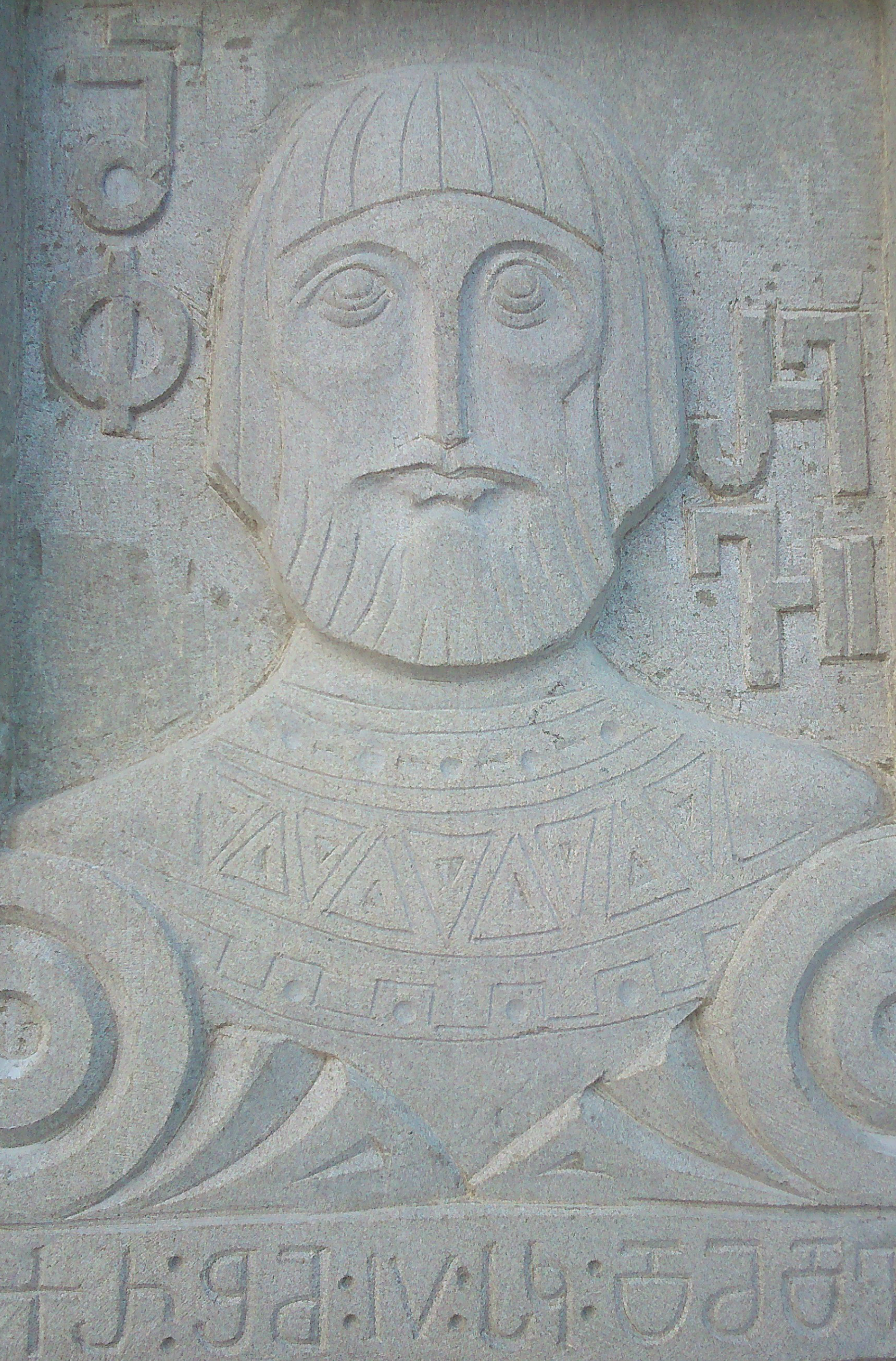
- Relief of Rev II

Co-King of Iberia
- Reign: 345–361
- Monarch: Mirian III
- Spouse: Salome of Ujarma
- Issue: Sauromaces II; Trdat of Iberia
- Dynasty: Chosroid dynasty
- Father: Mirian III
- Mother: Nana of Iberia
- Religion: Georgian Orthodox

Rev II (Georgian: რევ II) was a prince of Iberia of the Chosroid Dynasty (natively known as Kartli, eastern Georgia) who functioned as a co-king to his father Mirian III, the first Christian Georgian ruler and his mother was Nana of Iberia. Professor Cyril Toumanoff suggests the years 345–361 as the period of their joint reign.

== Biography ==
According to the medieval Georgian chronicles, Rev had an appanage at Ujarma in the eastern province of Kakheti. He married Salome, daughter of King Tiridates III of Armenia and his wife, Queen Ashkhen. Salome played a role in the conversion of Iberia c. 337. Rev died before his father and probably in the same year as he. Rev's purported first son Sauromaces, unknown to the Georgian historical tradition, then succeeded Mirian in 361. His second son, Trdat, known from the Georgian chronicles, reigned in Iberia from c. 394 to 406.
