= Timeline of official adoptions of Christianity =

This is a timeline showing the dates when countries or polities made Christianity the official state religion, generally accompanying the baptism of the governing monarch.

== Adoptions of Christianity to AD 1450 ==
- c. 34 or 200 – Osroene – disputed; both dates claimed
- 179 – Silures; traditional date, now considered questionable
- 301 – Christianization of Armenia; traditional date, but estimates have been given from a range of 284 to 325
- 301 – Foundation of San Marino
- c. 313 – Udis
- c. 319 – Christianization of Iberia (Georgia)
- c. 325 – Kingdom of Aksum (Ethiopian Orthodox Church)
- 337 – Roman Empire (baptism of Constantine I)
- 361 – Rome returns to paganism under Julian the Apostate
- 364 – Rome returns to Christianity, specifically the Arian Church
- c. 364 – Vandals (Arian Church)
- 376 – Goths and Gepids (Arian Church)
- 380 – Rome goes from Arian to Catholic/Orthodox (both terms are used refer to the same Church until 1054)
- 402 – Maronites (Nicene Church)
- 411 – Kingdom of Burgundy (Nicene Church)
- c. 420 – Najran (Nicene Church)
- 448 – Suebi (Nicene Church)
- c. 450 – Burgundy goes from Nicene to Arian
- 451 – Aksum and Najran are Coptic with Chalcedonian Schism.
- 466 – Suebi go from Chalcedonian to Arian
- 473 – Ghassanids (Chalcedonian Church)
- 480 – Lazica (Chalcedonian Church)
- 496 – Franks (Chalcedonian Church)
- 506 – Iberia goes from Chalcedonian to Apostolic
- c. 510 – Ghassanids go from Chalcedonian to Coptic
- 516 – Burgundy returns from Arian to Chalcedonian
- c. 543 – Makuria (Chalcedonian), Nobatia and Alodia (Coptic Church)
- c. 550 – Suebi return from Arian to Chalcedonian
- c. 558 – Christianization of Ireland (Celtic Church)
- c. 563 – Picts (Celtic Church)
- c. 568 – Lombards (Arian Church)
- 569 – Garamantes (Chalcedonian Church)
- 589 – Visigoths go from Arian to Chalcedonian
- 591 – Lombards go from Arian to Chalcedonian
- c. 592 – Lakhmids (Nestorian Church)
- 601 – Kent (Chalcedonian Church)
- 604 – East Anglia and Essex (Chalcedonian)
- 607 – Iberia returns from Apostolic to Chalcedonian
- 610 – Armenia and Udis go from Chalcedonian to Monophysite
- 616 – Kent and Essex return to paganism
- c. 620 – Alemanni (Chalcedonian Church)
- 624 – Kent returns from pagan to Chalcedonian
- 627 – Lombards return from Chalcedonian to Arian
- 627 – Northumbria – (Chalcedonian Church); East Anglia returns from Chalcedonian to pagan
- 630 – East Anglia returns from pagan to Chalcedonian
- 635 – Wessex (Chalcedonian Church)
- 653 – Lombards return from Arian to Chalcedonian
- 653 – Essex returns from pagan to Chalcedonian
- 655 – Mercia (Chalcedonian Church)
- 675 – Sussex (Chalcedonian Church)
- 685 – Maronites go from Chalcedonian to Monothelite
- 692 – Ireland goes from Celtic to Chalcedonian
- 696 – Bavaria (Chalcedonian)
- 706 – Udis are ecclesiastically subordinated to Armenia
- 710 – Picts go from Celtic to Chalcedonian
- c. 710 – Makuria goes from Chalcedonian to Coptic
- 724 – Thuringia
- 734 – Frisians
- 785 – Saxons
- c. 805 – Duchy of Lower Pannonia
- 840s – Navarre
- 863 – Moravia
- 864 – Christianization of Bulgaria
- c. 869 – Christianization of the Serbs
- 879 – Duchy of Croatia
- 884 – Bohemia
- c. 900 – Alania
- 911 – Normans
- 960 – Denmark
- 966 – Christianization of Poland
- c. 989 – Christianization of Kievan Rus'
- 995 – Norway
- 999 – Faroe Islands
- c. 1000 – Christianization of Hungary with the first real Christian king (Roman Catholic became official but Eastern Orthodox existed as well since 973 onwards even after 1054)
- c. 1000 – Christianisation of Iceland
- 1007 – Kerait Khanate – Nestorian Church
- c. 1008 – Sweden
- 1054 – Byzantine Empire, Kingdom of Georgia, Alania, Bulgaria, Serbs, and Rus' are Eastern Orthodox with East-West Schism while Western Europe becomes Roman Catholic
- 1096 – Maronites return from Monothelite to Catholic
- c. 1100 – Circassia (most of the country would remain pagan in spite of Georgian expansion into the region)
- 1124 – Conversion of Pomerania
- 1160s – Obotrites
- c. 1200 – Finland
- 1227 – Livonia, Cumania
- 1241 – Saaremaa
- 1260 – Curonians
- 1290 – Semigallians
- 1387 – Christianization of Lithuania
- 1413 – Samogitia

== Adoptions after 1450 ==
- 1491 – Kingdom of Kongo (Roman Catholic Church)
- 1519 – Tlaxcala (Roman Catholic Church)
- 1521 – Rajahnate of Cebu (Roman Catholic Church)
- 1523 – Sweden goes from Catholic to Lutheran
- 1528 – Schleswig-Holstein goes from Catholic to Lutheran
- 1534 – England goes from Catholic to Anglican
- 1536 – Denmark-Norway and Iceland go from Catholic to Lutheran
- 1549 – Kingdom of Siau (Roman Catholic Church)
- 1553 – England returns from Anglican to Catholic
- 1558 – Kabardia (E. Orthodox Church) (Note: Circassian paganism remained the religion of the majority of the population until the 17th century.)
- 1558 – England returns from Catholic to Anglican
- 1560 – Scotland goes from Catholic to Presbyterian
- 1610 – Mi'kmaq (Roman Catholic Church)
- 1624 – Kingdom of Ndongo (Roman Catholic Church)
- 1624 – Ethiopia goes from Coptic to Catholic
- 1631 – Kingdom of Matamba (Roman Catholic Church)
- 1633 – Ethiopia returns from Catholic to Coptic
- 1640 – Piscataway (Roman Catholic Church)
- 1642 – Huron-Wendat Nation (Roman Catholic Church)
- 1650 – Kingdom of Larantuka (Roman Catholic Church)
- 1654 – Onondaga (Roman Catholic Church)
- 1663–1665 – Kingdom of Loango (briefly Roman Catholic)
- 1675 – Illinois Confederation (Roman Catholic Church)
- 1680 – Siau goes from Catholic to Reformed
- 1700s – Kingdom of Bolaang Mongondow (Reformed Church)
- 1819 – Kingdom of Tahiti, Kingdom of Hawaii (Congregational Church)
- 1829 – Spokane, Kutenai (Anglican Church)
- 1830 – Samoa (Congregational Church)
- 1831 – Tonga (Methodist Church)
- 1838 – Nez Perce (Presbyterian Church)
- 1869 – Merina Kingdom (Reformed Church)
- 1882 – Blackfoot Confederacy (Roman Catholic Church)
- 1880 – Shoshone (LDS Church)
- 1884 – Lakota (Roman Catholic Church)
- 1884 – Catawba (LDS Church)
- 1897 – Shoshone go from LDS to Anglican
- 1907 – Arapaho (Baptist Church)

== See also ==
- History of Christianity
- Christianization
