= Saint Nino =

Early Christian saint

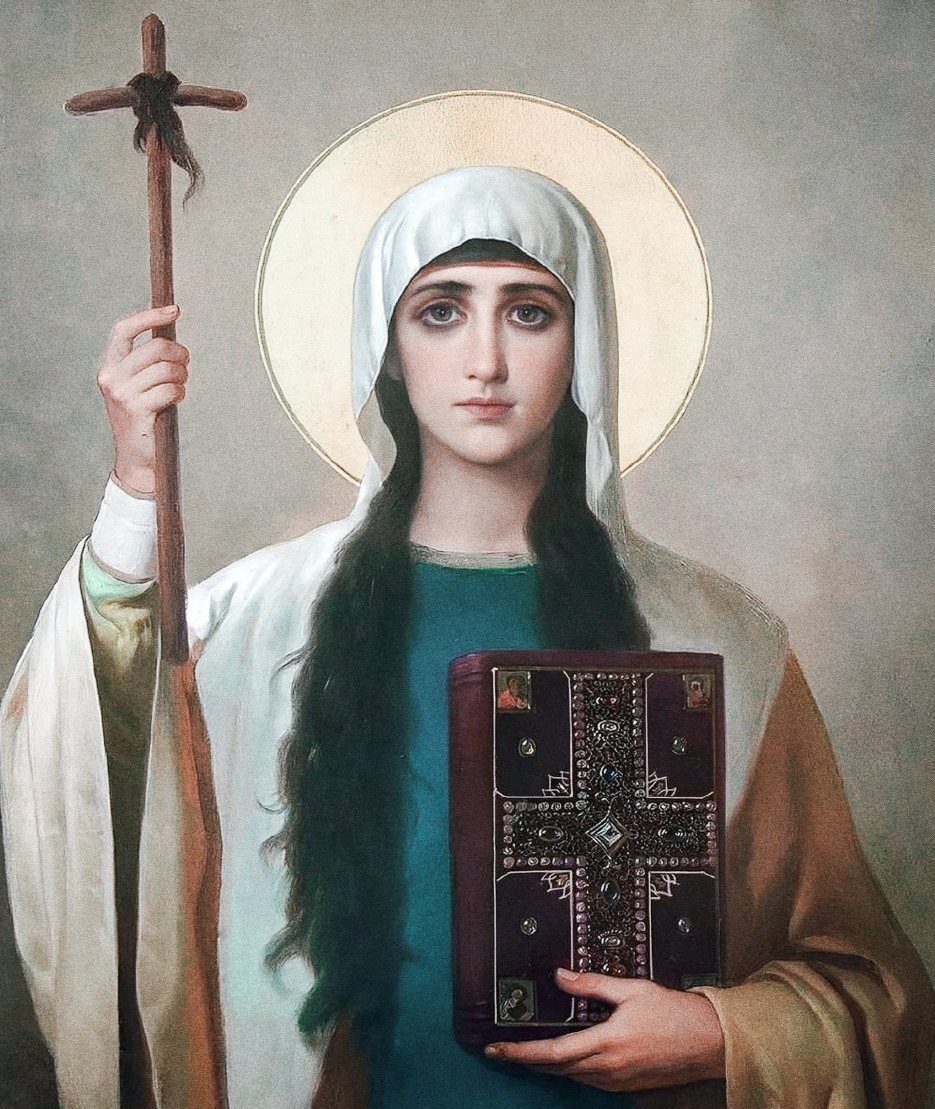
- Icon of Saint Nino

Equal to the Apostles and the Enlightener of Georgia
- Born: c. 280s or c. 290s (Note: The proposed dates are 280, 286, and 296.); Cyzistra, Cappadocia
- Died: c. 320s or c. 330s (Note: The proposed dates are 321, 338, and 340.); Bodbe, Kakheti (modern-day Georgia)
- Venerated in: Eastern Orthodox Church; Catholic Church; Oriental Orthodox Churches
- Major shrine: Bodbe Monastery
- Feast: Entering Kartli; May 19 (New Calendar); June 1 (Old Calendar); Death; January 14 (New Calendar); January 27 (Old Calendar)
- Attributes: Grapevine cross
- Patronage: Georgia

Saint Nino (sometimes St. Nune, St. Nina or St. Ninny; Georgian: წმინდა ნინო, romanized: ts'minda nino; Armenian: Սուրբ Նունե, romanized: Surb Nune; Greek: Ἁγία Νίνα, romanized: Hagía Nína) was a woman who preached Christianity in the territory of the Kingdom of Iberia in what is now Georgia. Her preaching led to the Christianization of Iberia.

According to most traditional accounts, she belonged to a Greek-speaking Roman family from Kolastra, Cappadocia, was a relative of Saint George, and came to Iberia from Armenia.

At the age of 14, Nino served as a lady-in-waiting to a Christian noblewoman whom Diocletian wished to marry. The woman refused, and Nino, together with her mistress and other attendants, fled to avoid persecution. All were killed except Nino, who survived by hiding. According to tradition, she then received a vision of the Virgin Mary, who gave her a grapevine cross and instructed her to travel to Iberia (modern-day Georgia) to spread the Christian faith. Nino traveled to Iberia, preached Christianity, and converted the entire country.

According to tradition, she performed miraculous healings and converted the Georgian queen, Nana, and eventually the pagan king Mirian III of Iberia, who, lost in darkness and blinded on a hunting trip, found his way only after praying to "Nino's God". Mirian declared Christianity the official religion of his kingdom (c. 326), and Nino continued her missionary activities among Georgians until her death.

Her tomb is still venerated at the Bodbe Monastery in Kakheti, eastern Georgia. She has become one of the most venerated saints of the Georgian Orthodox Church, and her attribute, the grapevine cross, is a symbol of Georgian Christianity.

She was named Christiana by Rufinus and Theognosta by the Byzantines.

== Biography ==
=== Sources ===
The oldest extant source describing the life of Saint Nino is the Latin account by Rufinus in his Historia ecclesiastica, composed around 403. This account is based on oral information provided to Rufinus by a Georgian prince named Bacurius, whom he met in Palestine. Bacurius was a member of the royal house of Iberia and recounted events that had taken place just over half a century earlier, during the lifetime of his parents or, at the latest, his grandparents. Scholars have hypothesized that Rufinus also relied on the Ecclesiastical History of Gelasius of Caesarea, a Greek-language work that is now lost. Other early Christian authors who wrote about Saint Nino include Socrates of Constantinople, Sozomen, Theodoret of Cyrrhus, Gelasius of Cyzicus, Movses Khorenatsi and Theophanes the Confessor. The 10th-century Georgian hagiographic work Conversion of Kartli largely repeats the accounts of earlier authors. The only notable difference is that, while earlier sources report that Nino was captured by the Iberians, the Conversion of Kartli does not mention this.

=== Early life ===
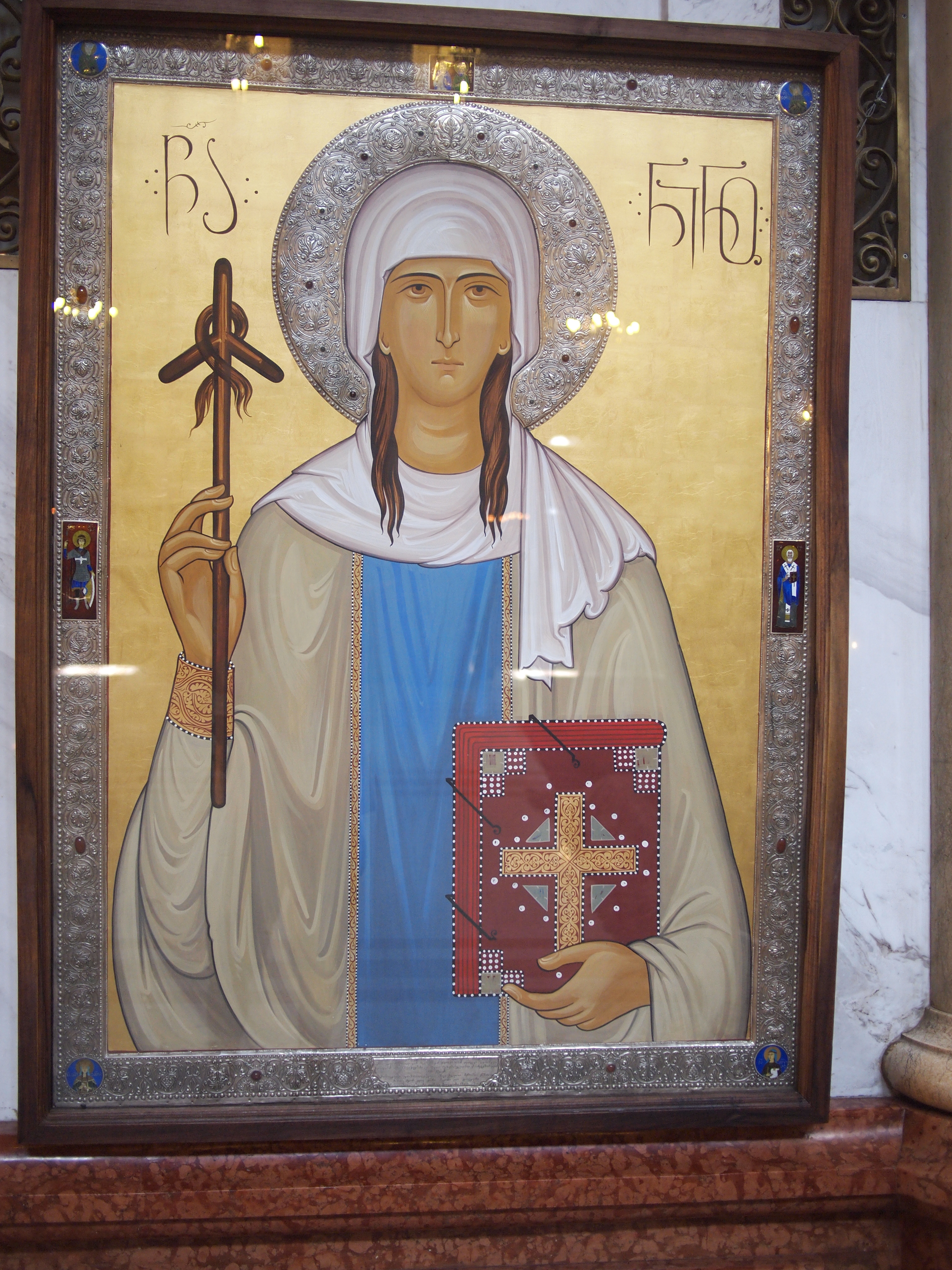
Icon of Saint Nino

Saint Nino’s ethnic background is not clearly known. She was born in Cappadocia, a region inhabited by many ethnic groups, and it is certain that she spoke Greek and Hebrew. At the beginning of her stay in Kartli, she communicated with the Georgians through members of the local Jewish community and required a Greek interpreter to communicate with the king's messenger.

According to some accounts, Nino came from an aristocratic family. Her father was the Roman commander Zabulon, who served under Emperor Maximian, and her mother was Susanna (Sosana), who, according to later versions of her biography, was the sister of the Patriarch of Jerusalem.

According to Georgian church tradition, Nino was also related to the Great Martyr Saint George. Some sources suggest that he was also a friend of her father.

At the age of twelve, Nino’s parents dedicated themselves entirely to God. They sold all their possessions, distributed the proceeds to the poor, and went to Jerusalem, where her father joined a monastery and her mother cared for sick nuns. Nino was entrusted to the care of a devout woman, Sarah Miafore, who lived near the Church in Jerusalem.

In Jerusalem, Nino met a woman who had come from Ephesus to venerate the tomb of Christ. The woman told Nino and Miafore about the intention of Empress Helena to receive baptism. Inspired by this news, Nino wished to travel to Constantinople to meet the Empress and preach the word of God. The Patriarch blessed her journey and gave Nino a cross, after which she set out together with the woman from Ephesus.

Nino and her companion stayed for two years in Ephesus in the household of a noblewoman, Hripsime, who converted under Nino’s guidance along with forty other members of her household. Later, Nino, Hripsime, her nurse Gayane, and other virgins fled to the Caucasus to escape Emperor Diocletian. The group was martyred in Armenia, with Nino alone escaping to Kartli.

According to another tradition, Nino intended to travel to Georgia to venerate the tunic of Christ preserved in Mtskheta. In a vision, the Virgin Mary appeared to her, blessing her mission and giving her a grapevine cross, which Nino tied to her hair upon awakening.

=== In Iberia ===
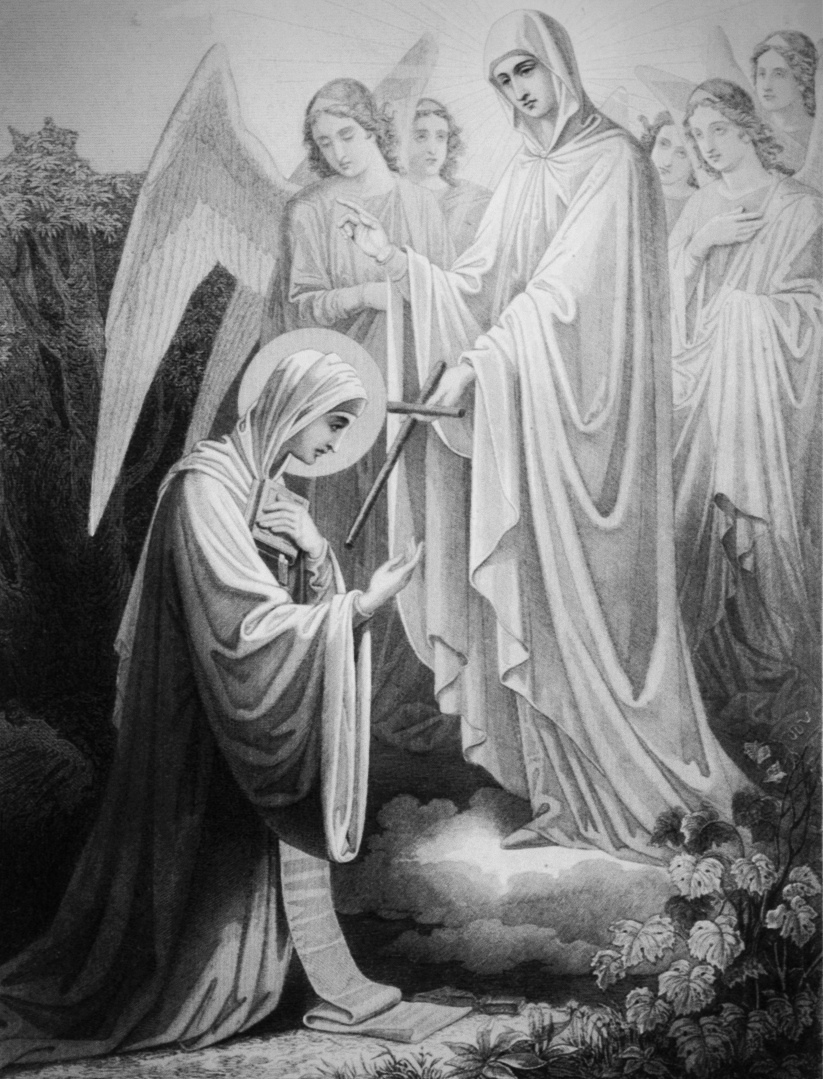
Mikhail Sabinin — Holy Virgin Blesses St. Nino (1882)

Nino traveled through the Javakheti mountains and reached the territory of the ancient Georgian Kingdom of Kartli. She initially stayed in Urbnisi, living for a month within the Jewish community in order to learn local customs.

She quickly learned the Georgian language and, according to sources, also had knowledge of Armenian, likely taught by her Armenian protector Sarah Miafore in Jerusalem. Nino soon began preaching the Gospel in her new homeland.

Nino quickly gained followers, including Salome of Ujarma, Perozhavra of Sivnia, and Abiathar and Sidonia. Her missionary activity was accompanied by miraculous healings; among those healed was Queen Nana, who subsequently converted to Christianity.

Mirian, aware of his wife's religious conversion, was intolerant of her new faith, persecuting it and threatening to divorce his wife if she did not abandon it. However, according to legend, while hunting he was suddenly struck blind. In desperation, he prayed to the God of St Nino:

So this is it, I had my god and found no joy. Let the one preached by Nino, the cross and the one that was crucified and does the healing, by his glory – isn't he powerful enough to save me from this trouble? As I am lively into a hell and I don't know, how the whole world was this destroyed, or is it just for me. Let, if this is only for me to be in trouble like this, O God of Nino, enlighten the darkness and show me the place of mine and I will recognize your name, and will erect a pillar of Cross and will respect it and will build a house for me to pray, and will be obedient to Nino's faith of Rome.

Immediately after his prayer, light appeared, and Mirian returned to his palace in Mtskheta. As a result, Mirian renounced idolatry under Nino’s teaching and was baptized as the first Christian king of Iberia. In 326, King Mirian made Christianity the state religion, making Iberia the second Christian state after Armenia.

Mirian later petitioned Emperor Constantine I and his mother Helena to send clergy to Kartli for the baptism of the population. Roman historian Tyrannius Rufinus writes in Historia Ecclesiastica:

After the church had been built with due magnificence, the people were zealously yearning for God's faith. An embassy was sent on behalf of the entire nation to the Emperor Constantine in accordance with the captive woman's advice. The foregoing events are related to him, and a petition submitted, requesting that priests be sent to complete the work that God had begun. Sending them on their way amidst rejoicing and ceremony, the Emperor was far more glad at that news than if he had annexed to the Roman Empire peoples and realms unknown.

First, the royal family and the court were baptized, followed by the people in Mtskheta at the confluence of the Aragvi and Mtkvari (Kura) rivers. Under Nino’s guidance, crosses were erected in the mountains where idols had once stood, symbolizing the triumph of Christianity: above Mtskheta (today the Jvari Monastery), on Mount Tkhoti, and in the town of Ujarma. Churches were also built at Svetitskhoveli, Ninotsminda, Sioni, and Nekresi.

=== Final Years ===
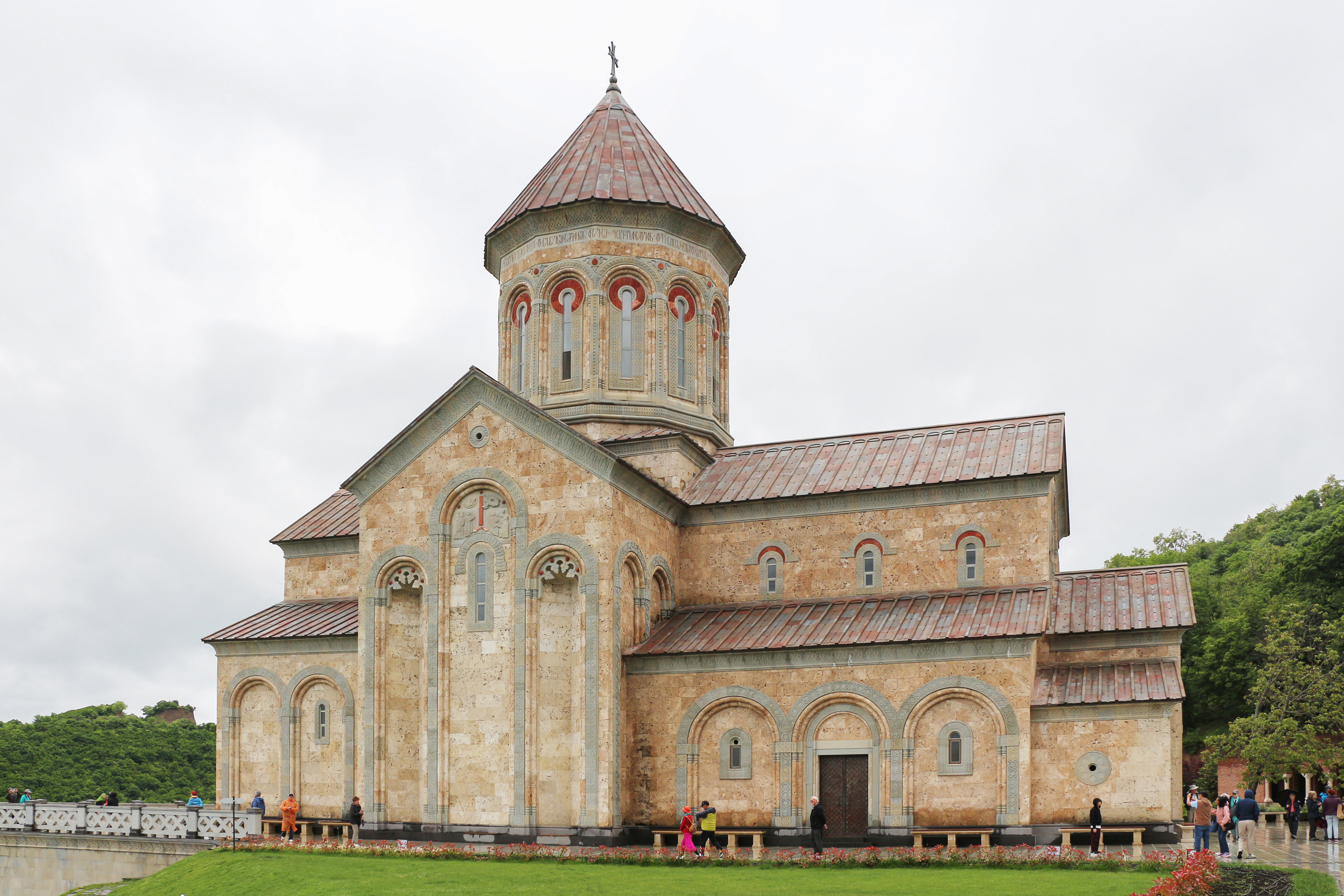
Bodbe Monastery near Signagi where the remains of St. Nino are enshrined.

Nino continued missionary work in the mountainous regions of eastern Georgia, accompanied by priests and royal representatives. In her final years, Nino lived in Bodbe, Kakheti, where she also died. Shortly after her death, King Mirian began the construction of a monastery in Bodbe, where her tomb can still be seen in the churchyard.

== Legacy ==
The Phoka Convent of St. Nino was established in rural Georgia by Abbess Elizabeth and two novices. They originally lived in a nearby house owned by Georgian Orthodox Church head Patriarch Ilia II and in 1992 moved to the site of an 11th-century church to restore it.

The Sacred Monastery of Saint Nina is the home of a monastic community of Georgian Apostolic Orthodox Christian nuns in the Patriarchate of Georgia's North American Diocese. It is located in Union Bridge, Maryland, USA, and was established in September 2012.

Nino and its variants remain the most popular name for women and girls in the Republic of Georgia. There are currently 88,442 women over the age of 16 with that name residing in the country, according to the Georgian Ministry of Justice. It also continues to be a popular name for baby girls.

Her parents Zabulon and Susanna were canonised in 1997.

== Feast days ==
- 14 January – main commemoration,
- 19 May – Nina entrance into Georgia in 303, (Note: და შეჰვედრა სული თჳსი ჴელთა ღმრთისათა ქართლს მოსლვითგან (Note: წმ. ნინომ, ჯერ ისევ 14 წლის ყრმამ, გადასწყვიტა წამოსულიყო ქართლში ქრისტეს სარწმუნოების საქადაგებლად.) მისით ოცდამეხუთმეტესა წელსა და ქრისტჱეს ამაღლებიდგან სამას ოცდათურამეტსა წელსა, დასაბამითგან ხუთ ათას რვაას ოცდათურამეტსა წელსა.)
- 20 May – commemoration of saint Zabulon and Susanna, parents of saint Nina,
- 23 May – commemoration in Georgia,
- 29 October – commemoration in Armenia,
- 15 December – older Catholic commemoration.

== See also ==
- Georgian Orthodox Church
