= Nana of Iberia =

Saint Queen Nana
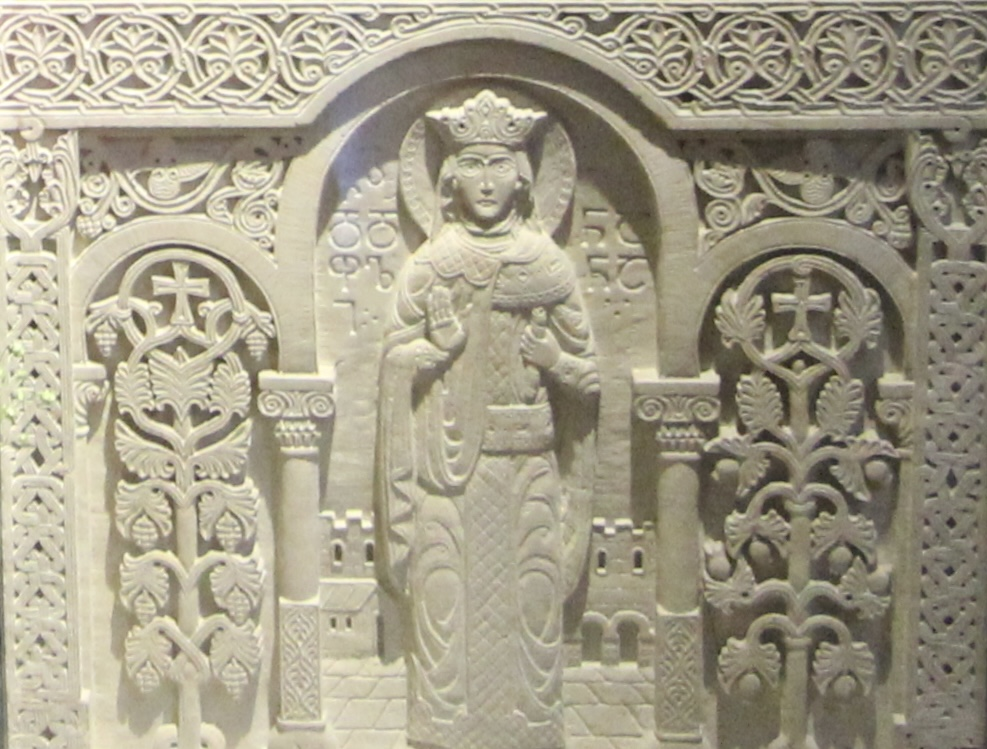
- Sarcophagus of Nana at Samtavro Monastery

Queen consort of Iberia
- Tenure: 292–361
- Predecessor: Abeshura of Iberia
- Born: 3rd century Bosporan Kingdom
- Died: 4th century Mtskheta, Kingdom of Iberia
- Burial: Samtavro Monastery, Mtskheta
- Spouse: Mirian III of Iberia
- Issue: Rev II of Iberia; Aspacures II of Iberia anonymous daughter
- Dynasty: Tiberian-Julian dynasty (by birth); Chosroid dynasty (by marriage)
- Father: Tiberius Julius Theothorses
- Religion: Georgian Orthodox Church

Nana (Georgian: ნანა) was a Queen consort of the Kingdom of Iberia as the second wife of Mirian III in the 4th century. For her role in the conversion of Georgians to Christianity she is regarded by the Georgian Orthodox Church as a saint and is canonized as Saint Equal to the Apostles Queen Nana (Georgian: წმინდა მოციქულთასწორი დედოფალი ნანა, romanized: ts'minda motsikultasts'ori dedopali nana).

== Family ==
According to the Georgian chronicles, Nana was "from a Greek territory, from Pontus, the daughter of Oligotos" whom Mirian married after his first wife died (in 292 according to Cyril Toumanoff). Nana bore Mirian two sons: Rev II, Varaz-Bakur and a daughter who married Peroz, the first Mihranid dynast of Gugark. Pontus here may refer to the Bosporan Kingdom, then a client state of the Roman Empire. Toumanoff has assumed that the name of Nana's father might have been a Georgian corruption of "Olympius" or "Olympus", a Bosporan dynast whose son Aurelius Valerius Sogus Olympianus, a Roman governor of Theodosia, is known from a Greek inscription of 306 dedicated to "the Most High God" on the occasion of the building of the Jewish "prayer house". Alternatively, Christian Settipani identifies Nana as a younger daughter of Theothorses, a Bosporan king.

== Conversion ==
The medieval Georgian sources relate that Nana had been a staunch pagan and despised Christian preaching until she was miraculously cured of a terrible disease, and subsequently converted, by a Cappadocian Christian missionary, Nino. The Roman scholar Tyrannius Rufinus, writing his history half a century after the Iberian conversion on the basis of the oral account of Bacurius the Iberian, also mentions an unnamed queen of the Iberians who was cured by a woman, a Christian captiva. Through Nino's ministry, King Mirian was also converted around 337 and Christianity became an official religion in Iberia. Nana outlived her husband by two years and died, according to Toumanoff's chronology, in 363. She was canonized by the Georgian church. Nana and Mirian are traditionally considered to have been buried at the Samtavro convent in Mtskheta, where their tombs are still shown.
