= Mirian III =

First Iberian king from the Chosroid dynasty

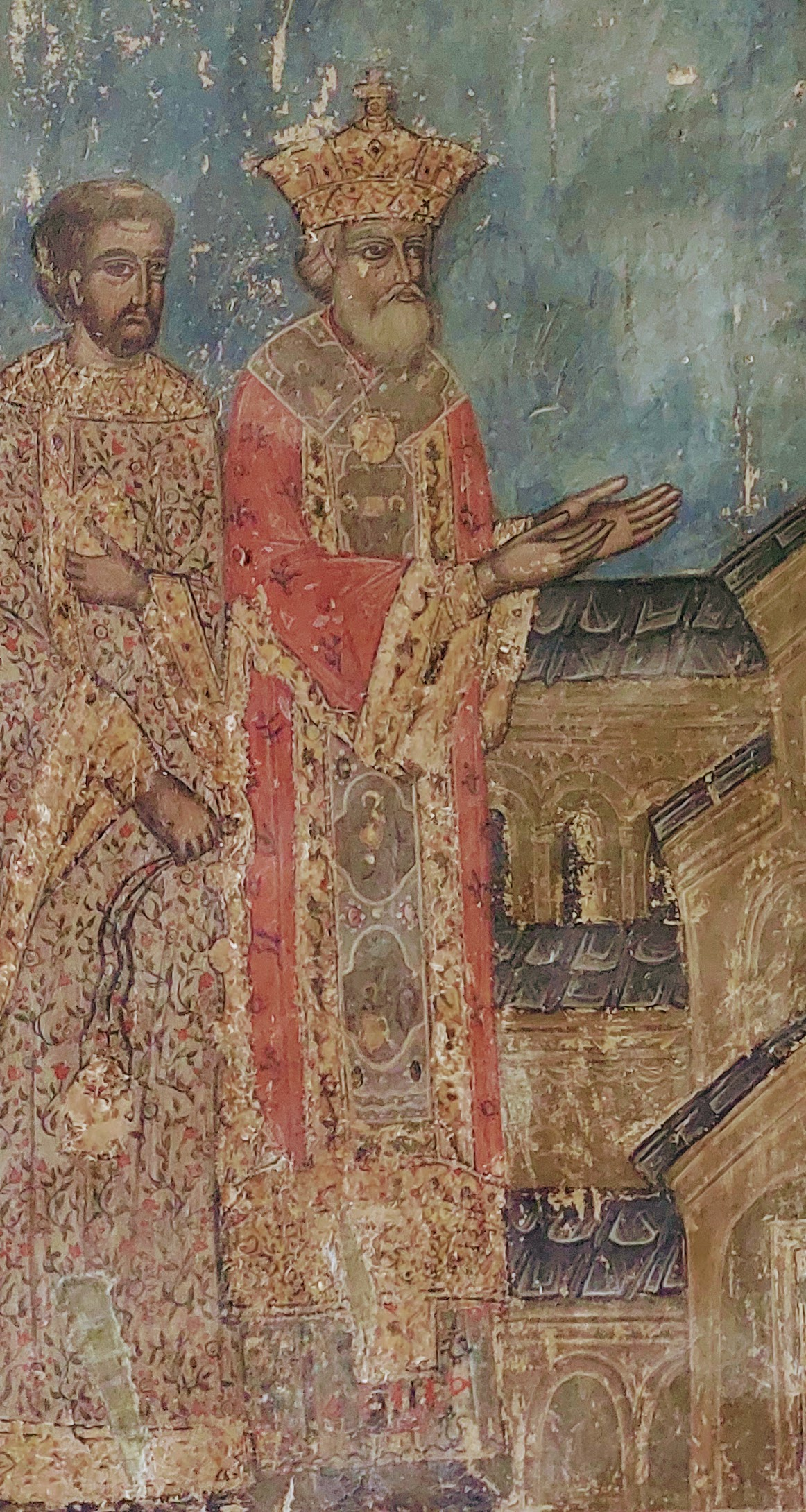
- King Mirian, fresco from Svetitskhoveli Cathedral

King of Iberia
- Reign: 284–361
- Predecessor: Aspacures I
- Successor: Sauromaces II
- Born: c. 277 or 278; Sasanian Iran
- Died: 361 (aged 83–84); Mtskheta, Iberia
- Burial: Samtavro Monastery, Mtskheta
- Spouse: Abeshura; Nana
- Issue: Rev II; Aspacures II; Anonymous daughter
- Dynasty: Chosroid dynasty
- Religion: Georgian Orthodox Church (from 326); Zoroastrianism (before 326)

Mirian III (Georgian: მირიან III; c. 258/277 — 361) was a king (mepe) of Iberia or Kartli (Georgia), contemporaneous to the Roman emperor Constantine the Great (r. 306–337). He was the founder of the royal Chosroid dynasty.

According to the early Medieval Georgian annals and hagiography, Mirian was the first Christian king of Iberia, converted through the ministry of Nino, a Cappadocian female missionary. Following the Christianization of Iberia, he is credited with having established Christianity as his kingdom's state religion and is regarded by the Georgian Orthodox Church as a saint and was canonized as Saint Equal to the Apostles King Mirian (Georgian: წმინდა მოციქულთასწორი მეფე მირიანი).

Traditional chronology, in line with Prince Vakhushti's Description of the Kingdom of Georgia, assigns to Mirian's reign—taken to have lasted for 77 years—the dates 268–345, which Professor Cyril Toumanoff changed to 284–361. He was also known to the contemporary Roman historian Ammianus Marcellinus and the medieval Armenian chronicles.

== Name ==
"Mirian" is the Georgian form of the Iranian name of Mihrān. The name is transliterated in Greek as Mithranes. According to the Life of Vakhtang, his name was also associated with Mirdat, meaning "given by Mithra", the name of the ancient Iranian sun god. His name is rendered as Meribanes by the Roman historian Ammianus Marcellinus (XXI, 6, 8). The regnal numbers as in Mirian III are modern and were not used by the medieval Georgian authors. Since two kings preceded him with that name, Mirian has been assigned the ordinal "III" in Georgian historiography.

== Background and accession ==
Mirian was a member of the House of Mihran, one of the Seven Great Houses of Iran. The family, based at Ray in northern Iran, traced its ancestry back to the ruling Arsacid Empire, the predecessors of the Sasanian Empire. Mirian himself was also born in Iran and was originally a Zoroastrian. In 284, the Sasanian King of Kings (shahanshah) Bahram II (r. 274–293) secured the Iberian throne for Mirian, which laid the foundation for Mihranid rule in Iberia, which would last into the sixth century. Thus, the Chosroid dynasty of which Mirian became the first head, was a branch of the Mihranid princely family. The motive behind Bahram II's move was to strengthen Sasanian authority in the Caucasus and use the position of the Iberian capital Mtskheta as an entrance to the important passes through the Caucasus Mountains. This was of so high importance to Bahram II, that he allegedly himself went to Mtskheta in order to secure Mirian's position. He also sent one of his grandees named Mirvanoz (also a Mihranid) to the country in order to act as the guardian of Mirian, who was then merely aged seven. After Mirian's marriage with Abeshura (daughter of the previous Iberian ruler Aspacures), 40,000 Sasanian "select mounted warriors" were subsequently stationed in eastern Iberia, Caucasian Albania and Gugark. In western Iberia, 7,000 Sasanian cavalrymen were sent to Mtskheta to safeguard Mirian.

A few decades later, other branches of the Mihranid family were established on other Caucasian thrones, one of them being in Gugark, and the other in the Armeno-Albania principality of Gardman.

== Early reign ==
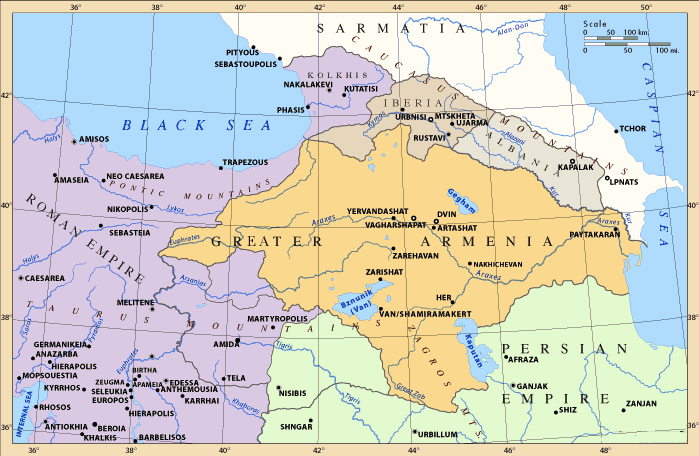
Map of the Caucasus in the 4th-century

The Life of the Kings recounts Mirian's reign in much detail. While its information about Mirian's participation—as an Iranian client king—in the Sasanid war against the Roman Empire, and territorial ambitions in Armenia can be true, the claims of Mirian being a pretender to the throne of Iran, of him being in control of Colchis and Albania, and expanding his activity as far as Syria is obviously fictional. Mirian inherited a kingdom that had been ruling Iberia since the 4th century BC. Iberia, like the rest of the Caucasus, was dominated by Iranian cultures and mixtures of the Zoroastrian religion. Indeed, according to the modern historian Stephen H. Rapp, the Caucasus was part of the "Iranian Commonwealth", "a massive cross-cultural enterprise stretching from Central Asia to the Balkans." In the Paikuli inscription of the shahanshah Narseh (r. 293–303), an unnamed king of Iberia is included as one of the shahanshah's vassals, most likely Mirian.

Mirian, as a Sasanian vassal, took part in Narseh's brief war against the Romans from 297 to 298. The war ended with a crushing Sasanian defeat, forcing Narseh to cede Armenia and Iberia to the Romans. Mirian quickly adapted to this change in political situation, and established close ties with Rome. This association was cemented by Mirian's conversion to Christianity — according to tradition — through the ministry of Nino, a Cappadocian nun. Nevertheless, as Ammianus Marcellinus recounts, Constantine's successor, Constantius, had to send in 360 embassies with costly presents to Arsaces of Armenia and Meribanes of Iberia to secure their allegiance during his confrontation with Iran.

== Conversion to Christianity ==
Saint Mirian
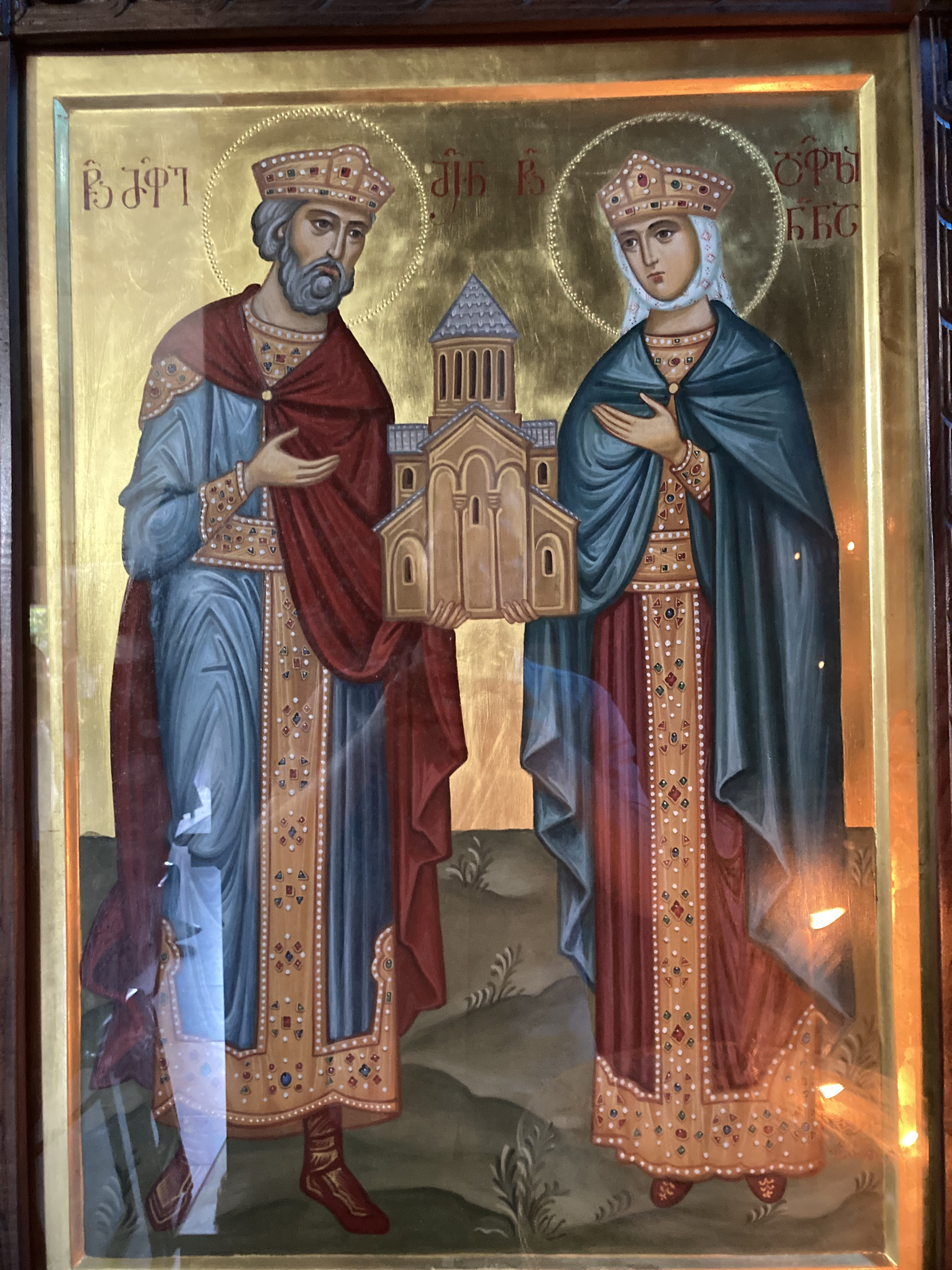

Equal-to-apostles
- Died: c. 361
- Venerated in: Eastern Orthodox Church
- Feast: 1 October

Mirian's conversion to Christianity and adaptation of Iberia's state religion is accepted by scholars to have occurred either in 319 or 326, thus, making Georgia the second kingdom after Armenia to have declared Christianity as a state religion. A legend has it that when Mirian, staunchly pagan, was hunting in the woods near his capital Mtskheta, darkness fell upon the land and the king was totally blinded. The light did not resume until Mirian prayed to "Nino's God" for aid. Upon his arrival he summoned Nino to an audience and converted to Christianity soon after. According to tradition, Mirian's second wife, Nana, preceded her husband in conversion.

His conversion fostered the growth of the central royal government, which confiscated the pagan temples' properties and gave them to the nobles and the church; medieval Georgian sources give evidence of how actively the monarchy and the nobility propagated Christianity and of the resistance they encountered from the mountain folk. The Roman historian Rufinus as well as the Georgian annals report that, after their conversion, the Iberians requested clergymen from emperor Constantine, who responded vigorously and sent priests and holy relics to Iberia. The Georgian tradition then relates a story of the construction of a cathedral in Mtskheta at Mirian's behest and the king's pilgrimage to Jerusalem shortly before his death. According to tradition, Mirian and his wife Nana were buried at the Samtavro convent in Mtskheta, where their tombs are still displayed to the public.

== Family ==
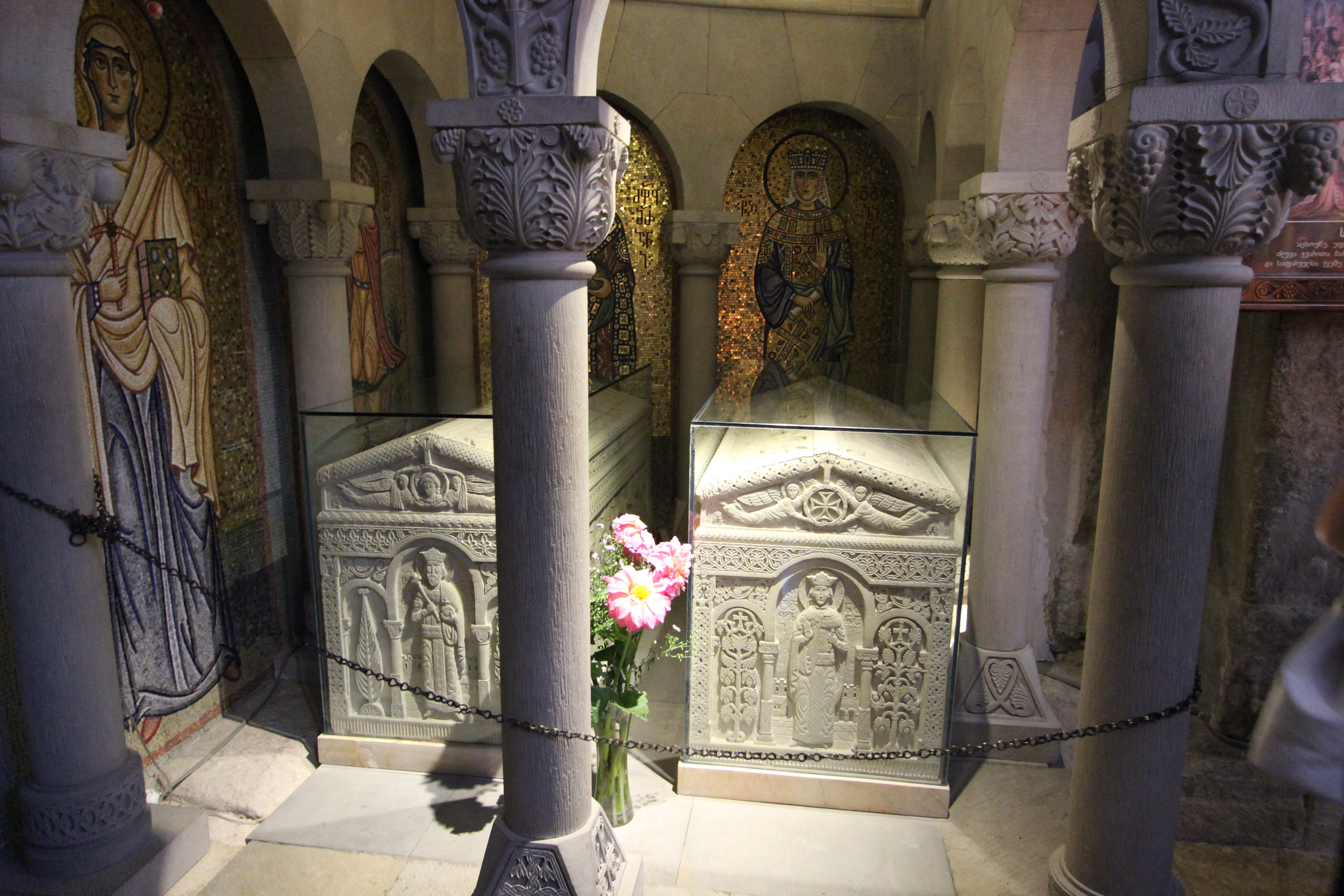
The burials of King Mirian and Queen Nana at Samtavro church in Mtskheta

The Georgian sources speak of Mirian's two marriages. His first wife was Abeshura, daughter of the last Arsacid Iberian king who also traced his ancestry to the ancient Pharnabazid dynasty of Iberia. She died without issue when Mirian was 15 years old, in 292 according to Toumanoff. With her death, "the kingship and queenship of the Pharnabazid kings came to an end in Iberia", — the chronicler continues. Mirian subsequently remarried his second queen, Nana "from Pontus, daughter of Oligotos", who bore him two sons—Rev and Varaz-Bakur—and a daughter who married Peroz, the first Mihranid dynast of Gugark.

== Sources ==
- Aleksidze, Nikoloz (2018). "Mirian (Meribanes)". In Nicholson, Oliver (ed.). The Oxford Dictionary of Late Antiquity. Oxford: Oxford University Press. ISBN 978-0-19-866277-8.
- Brunner, Christopher (1983). "Geographical and Administrative divisions: Settlements and Economy". The Cambridge History of Iran: The Seleucid, Parthian, and Sasanian periods (2). Cambridge: Cambridge University Press. pp. 747–778. ISBN 978-0-521-24693-4.
- Lenski, Noel (2002). Failure of Empire: Valens and the Roman State in the Fourth Century A.D. University of California Press.
- Stausberg, Michael; Vevaina, Yuhan Sohrab-Dinshaw; Tessmann, Anna (2015). The Wiley Blackwell Companion to Zoroastrianism. John Wiley & Sons, Ltd.
- Mayor, Adrienne (2009). The Poison King: The Life and Legend of Mithradates, Rome's Deadliest Enemy. Princeton University Press. pp. 1–448. ISBN 9780691150260.
- Bowman, Alan (2005). The Cambridge Ancient History: Volume 12, The Crisis of Empire, AD 193-337. Cambridge University Press. pp. 1–965.
- Mikaberidze, Alexander (2015). Historical Dictionary of Georgia. Rowman & Littlefield Publishers. ISBN 978-1-4422-4146-6.
- Rapp, Stephen H. (2003). Studies in Medieval Georgian Historiography: Early Texts and Eurasian Contexts. Peeters. ISBN 978-2-87723-723-9.
- Rapp, Stephen H. (2014). The Sasanian World through Georgian Eyes: Caucasia and the Iranian Commonwealth in Late Antique Georgian Literature. Routledge. ISBN 978-1472425522.
- Rapp, Stephen H. (2017). "Georgia before the Mongols (2017)". Oxford Research Encyclopedia of Asian History. Oxford University Press: 1–39.
- Rayfield, Donald (2013). Edge of Empires: A History of Georgia. Reaktion Books. ISBN 978-1780230702.
- Suny, Ronald Grigor (1994). The Making of the Georgian Nation (Second ed.). Indiana University Press. ISBN 0-253-20915-3.
- Pourshariati, Parvaneh (2008). Decline and Fall of the Sasanian Empire: The Sasanian-Parthian Confederacy and the Arab Conquest of Iran. London and New York: I.B. Tauris. ISBN 978-1-84511-645-3.
- Toumanoff, Cyril (1959). "Introduction to Christian Caucasian History: The Formative Centuries (IVth-VIIIth)". Traditio. 15. Cambridge University Press: 1–106. doi:10.1017/S0362152900008217. JSTOR 27830383. S2CID 151606969. (registration required)
- Toumanoff, Cyril (1969). "Chronology of the early kings of Iberia". Traditio. 25. Cambridge University Press: 1–33. doi:10.1017/S0362152900010898. JSTOR 27830864. S2CID 151472930. (registration required)
- Weber, Ursula (2016). "Narseh". In Yarshater, Ehsan (ed.). Encyclopædia Iranica (Online ed.). Encyclopædia Iranica Foundation.

Preceded by Aspacures I	King of Iberia; 284–361 (with Rev II and Salome as co-rulers, 345–361)	Succeeded by Sauromaces II
