= Avlipi Zurabashvili =

Georgian psychiatrist and neuromorphologist

- Born: 15 February 1902; Bodbiskhevi, Signagi district, Georgia
- Died: 15 August 1994 (aged 92); Tbilisi, Georgia
- Education: Tbilisi State University
- Scientific career
- Fields: Psychiatry; Neuromorphology
- Workplaces: Tbilisi State Medical University; M.M. Asatiani Scientific Research Institute of Psychiatry

Avlipi Zurabashvili (Georgian: ავლიპი ზურაბაშვილი; February 15, 1902 – August 15, 1994) was a prominent Georgian psychiatrist and neuromorphologist. Doctor of Medicine (1937), professor (1942), member of the Georgian Academy of Sciences (1955), members of the USSR Academy of Medical Sciences (1960). Is one of the pioneer researchers in Georgia into the ontogeny of the human CNS.

== Biography ==
Avlipi Zurabashvili was born on 15 February 1902 in the village of Bodbiskhevi, Signagi district, Georgia. In 1920 he finished the Tbilisi Technical High School, and in 1927 the medical faculty of Tbilisi State University. In 1927–1930 he served as an intern, and later assistant, at the chair of psychiatry of the same University. Between 1930 and 1938 Zurabashvili was post-graduate, and later senior researcher, at the Pavlov Institute of Physiology and the Bekhterev Psychoneurological Institute in Leningrad.

Zurabashvili is the author of basic studies in the fine structure of the brain, the reversibility of nervous cell lesions, pathopsychology, personology and pathopersonology that have received international recognition. He is the founder of the school of Georgian psychiatrist, widely known in this country and beyond its borders. Zurabashvili has 400 studies to his credit, published in Georgian, Russian, French, English, German, Italian, and other languages, including 22 monographs. Among his numerous pupils 80 are candidates and 40 doctors of science, as well as professors and members of scientific academies.

It should be emphasized that Zurabashvili initiated a special line of research in neuromorphology, termed «synaptoarchitectonics» and «pathosynaptoarchitectonics», and in 1947 he published, for the first time, a generalizing study: The Synapses (in Russian).
