= Bacurius the Iberian =

Ancient Roman general

Bacurius
- ბაკურ
- Born: Unknown; Kingdom of Iberia
- Died: 394
- Relatives: Possible maternal great-uncle or grandfather of Peter the Iberian
- Military career
- Allegiance: Eastern Roman Empire
- Rank: Magister militum
- Commands: Comes domesticorum
- Conflicts: Battle of Adrianople, Battle of the Frigidus

Bacurius (Georgian: ბაკურ, romanized: bak'ur) was a Roman general of Georgian origin and a member of the royal family of Iberia (Kartli, eastern Georgia) mentioned by several Greco-Roman authors of the 4th and 5th centuries. It is accepted, but not universally, that all these refer to the same person, an Iberian "king" or "prince", who joined the Roman military ranks. Scholarly opinion is divided whether Bacurius can be identified with one of the kings named Bacurius the Great (Georgian: ბაკურ დიდი, romanized: bak'ur didi), attested in medieval Georgian annals, who might have taken refuge in territories obtained by the Eastern Roman Empire during the Roman–Persian Wars that were fought over the Caucasus.

The oldest Georgian Bir el Qutt inscriptions mention Bacurius. He is also thought to be a possible maternal great-uncle or grandfather of Peter the Iberian.

== Name ==
The name Bacurius is the Latin form of the Greek Bakour (Βάκουρ), itself a variant of the Middle Iranian Pakur, derived from Old Iranian bag-puhr ('son of a god'). The name "Bakur" is the Georgian (ბაკურ) and Armenian (Բակուր) attestation of Middle Iranian Pakur.

== Life ==
Ammianus Marcellinus, Tyrannius Rufinus, and Zosimus report that Bacurius was "king of Iberians", but Gelasius of Caesarea does not call him king, but merely scion of the kings of Iberia. Bacurius was a tribunus sagittariorum at the Battle of Adrianople with the Goths in 378 and then served as dux Palaestinae and comes domesticorum until 394, when he became magister militum and commanded a "barbarian" contingent in Emperor Theodosius I's (r. 379–395) campaign against the Roman usurper Eugenius and met his death, according to Zosimus, at the Battle of the Frigidus. According to Socrates of Constantinople, Bacurius had also fought in Theodosius's earlier campaign against Magnus Maximus.

All contemporary sources are unequivocal in praising Bacurius's military skills and courage. Rufinus, whom Bacurius visited several times on the Mount of Olives and served him as a source of Christianization of Iberia, describes the general as a pious Christian, while the rhetorician Libanius, with whom Bacurius held correspondence, evidently regards him as a pagan and praises him both as a soldier and a man of culture.

== Sources ==
- Burns, Thomas S. (1994). Barbarians within the Gates of Rome: A Study of Roman Military Policy and the Barbarians, ca. 375–425 A.D. Bloomington, Indiana: Indiana University Press. ISBN 0-253-31288-4.
- Donald Rayfield (2013). Edge of Empires: A History of Georgia. Reaktion Books. p. 39. ISBN 9781780230702.
- Hunt, E. D. (1982). Holy Land Pilgrimage in the Later Roman Empire AD 312-460. Oxford, United Kingdom: Clarendon Press. ISBN 0-19-826438-0.
- Khurtsilava, Besik (2017). "The inscriptions of the Georgian Monastery in Bi'r el-Qutt and their chronology" (PDF). Christianity in the Middle East (1): 130.
- Martindale, John Robert; Jones, Arnold Hugh Martin; Morris, J., eds. (1971). The Prosopography of the Later Roman Empire. Vol. I: A.D. 260–395. Cambridge, United Kingdom: Cambridge University Press. ISBN 0-521-07233-6.
- Toumanoff, Cyril (1969). "Chronology of the Early Kings of Iberia". Traditio. 25: 1–33. doi:10.1017/S0362152900010898. S2CID 151472930.
