= 1702 =

1702 in various calendars
- Gregorian calendar: 1702; MDCCII
- Ab urbe condita: 2455
- Armenian calendar: 1151; ԹՎ ՌՃԾԱ
- Assyrian calendar: 6452
- Balinese saka calendar: 1623–1624
- Bengali calendar: 1108–1109
- Berber calendar: 2652
- English Regnal year: 14 Will. 3 – 1 Ann. 1
- Buddhist calendar: 2246
- Burmese calendar: 1064
- Byzantine calendar: 7210–7211
- Chinese calendar: 辛巳年 (Metal Snake); 4399 or 4192 — to — 壬午年 (Water Horse); 4400 or 4193
- Coptic calendar: 1418–1419
- Discordian calendar: 2868
- Ethiopian calendar: 1694–1695
- Hebrew calendar: 5462–5463
- Hindu calendars
- Vikram Samvat: 1758–1759
- Shaka Samvat: 1623–1624
- Kali Yuga: 4802–4803
- Holocene calendar: 11702
- Igbo calendar: 702–703
- Iranian calendar: 1080–1081
- Islamic calendar: 1113–1114
- Japanese calendar: Genroku 15 (元禄１５年)
- Javanese calendar: 1625–1626
- Julian calendar: Gregorian minus 11 days
- Korean calendar: 4035
- Minguo calendar: 210 before ROC 民前210年
- Nanakshahi calendar: 234
- Thai solar calendar: 2244–2245
- Tibetan calendar: ལྕགས་མོ་སྦྲུལ་ལོ་ (female Iron-Snake); 1828 or 1447 or 675 — to — ཆུ་ཕོ་རྟ་ལོ་ (male Water-Horse); 1829 or 1448 or 676

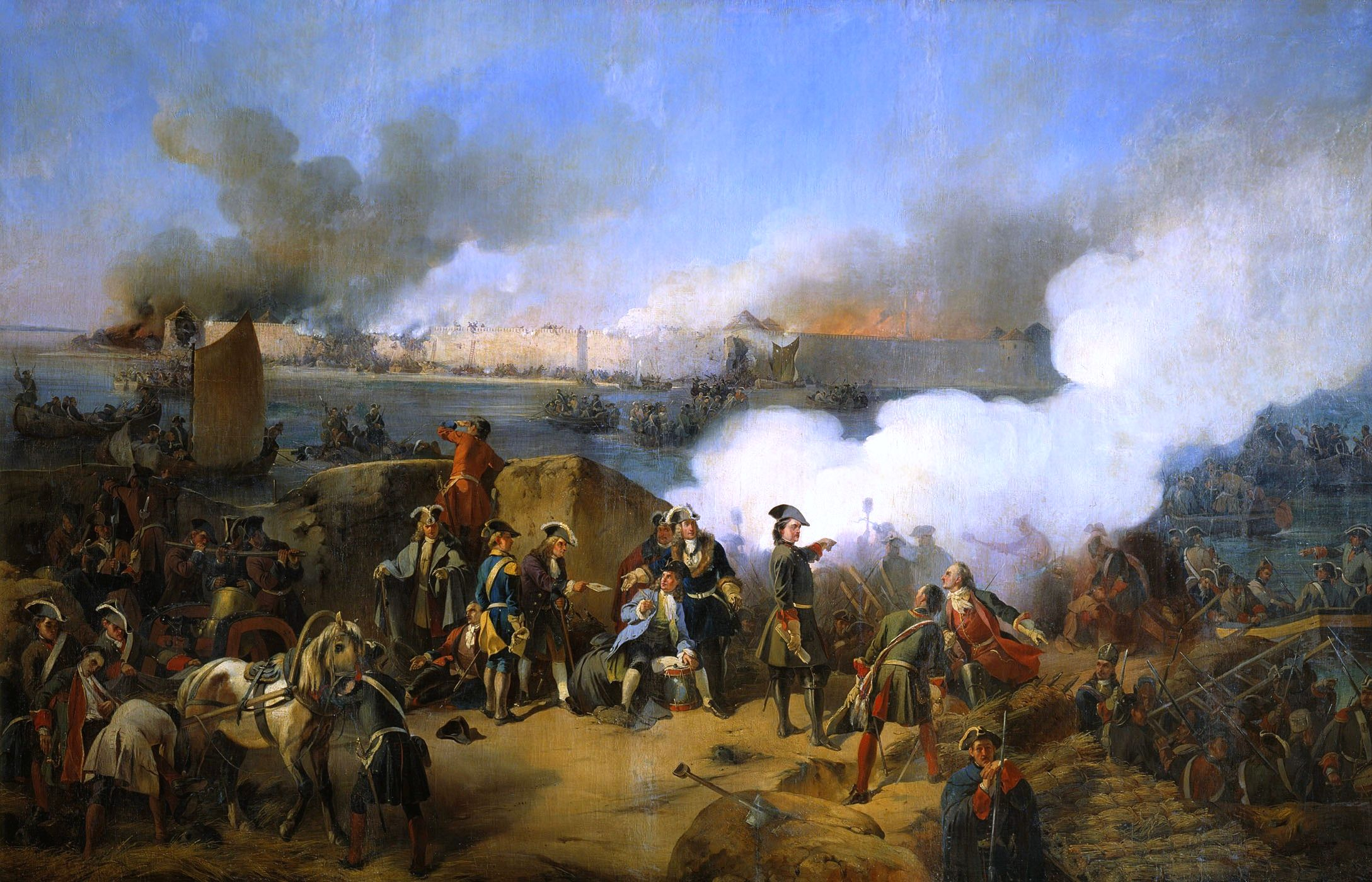
October 7: Russia's 15-day siege of Nöteborg begins in Sweden (Great Northern War)

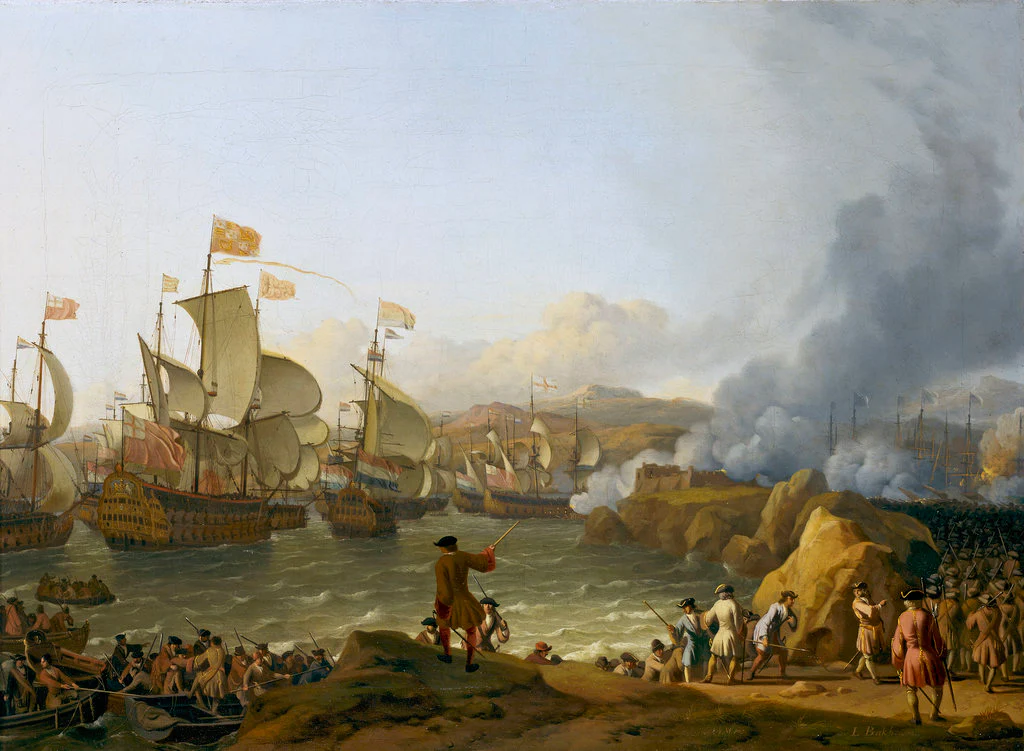
October 23: Battle of Vigo Bay: English and Dutch forces capture the Spanish port of Cádiz (War of the Spanish Succession)

1702 (MDCCII) was a common year starting on Sunday of the Gregorian calendar and a common year starting on Thursday of the Julian calendar, the 1702nd year of the Common Era (CE) and Anno Domini (AD) designations, the 702nd year of the 2nd millennium, the 2nd year of the 18th century, and the 3rd year of the 1700s decade. As of the start of 1702, the Gregorian calendar was 11 days ahead of the Julian calendar, which remained in localized use until 1923.

In the Swedish calendar it was a common year starting on Wednesday, one day ahead of the Julian and ten days behind the Gregorian calendar.

== Events ==
=== January–March ===
- January 2 – A total solar eclipse is visible from the southern Pacific Ocean.
- January 12 – In North America, ships from Fort Maurepas arrive at Twenty-Seven Mile Bluff to build Fort Louis de la Mobile (future Mobile, Alabama), to become the capital of French Louisiana.
- February 1 – War of the Spanish Succession – Battle of Cremona: The Duc de Villeroy, commander of the French Army, is taken as a prisoner of war by the Austrian Army.
- March 3 (February 20 O.S.) – King William III of England is fatally injured in an accident when he is thrown from his horse, "Sorrel", when it trips on a molehill in Hampton Court Park near London. Already in poor health before the accident, he dies from complications 16 days later at the age of 51.
- March 14 – An earthquake in the middle of the Calore valley in Italy, east of Benevento, kills 400 people.
- March 19 (March 8 Old Style) – Princess Anne Stuart, daughter of the late King James II and younger sister of his successor, Mary II (who had reigned jointly with her husband, William III, as William and Mary until her death in 1694), ascends the English, Scottish and Irish thrones upon William's death. In her first speech to the English Parliament, made three days later, she tells the assembly "As I know my heart to be entirely English, I can very sincerely assure you there is not anything you can expect or desire from me which I shall not be ready to do for the happiness and prosperity of England." Anne is the mother of 17 children by her husband, Prince George of Denmark and Norway, but none will survive childhood, and she will die without an heir, bringing an end to the reign of the House of Stuart and enabling the Hanoverian Succession. After the death of William, the States General of the Netherlands do not appoint a new stadtholder, and so the Dutch Republic becomes a true republic again, starting the Second Stadtholderless Period.
- March 22 (March 11 Old Style) – The first regular English-language national newspaper, The Daily Courant, begins publication on Fleet Street in the City of London, initially by Elizabeth Mallet; it covers only foreign news.
- March 24 – Great Northern War: Battle of Darsūniškis – The Swedish army of about 240 men under the command of Alexander Hummerhielm is defeated by the Polish–Saxon army of 6,000 men under Michał Serwacy Wiśniowiecki.

=== April–June ===
- April 3 – The Dutch East India Company ship Merestein strikes rocks and sinks in Saldanha Bay off Jutten Island, Africa with the loss of 101 of the 200 people on board.
- April 14 – Volcanic eruption of Changbaishan volcano (also known as Paektu Mountain) on the China/Korea border takes place.
- April 15 – The British Province of New Jersey, encompassing all of the modern-day U.S. state of New Jersey and portions of New York, is created as proprietary owners in the provinces of East Jersey and West Jersey surrender their rights to the Crown.
- April 20 – Comet C/1702 H1 is discovered and passes within 0.0435 AU (a little more than four million miles or 6.5 million km) of the Earth.
- April 24 – The first two missionaries from the Society for the Propagation of the Gospel in Foreign Parts set sail from England to North America.
- May 5 – Globular cluster Messier 5 (M5, NGC 5904) is discovered by Gottfried Kirch and his wife Maria Margarethe.
- May 6 – Cloudesley Shovell is promoted to full admiral in the English navy.
- May 14 (N.S.) – War of the Spanish Succession: War is declared on France by the Grand Alliance (Kingdom of England, Dutch Republic and Holy Roman Empire).
- May 15 (May 4 O.S.) – King Charles XII of Sweden and his troops walk unopposed into Warsaw after troops capture the city.
- May 16 – Much of the city of Uppsala, Sweden is destroyed in a fire.
- May 19 – Over 90% of the city of Bergen, Norway, is destroyed and reduced to ashes in a Great Fire.
- June 2 – English General John Churchill, later the Duke of Marlborough, takes command of the alliance of English, Dutch and German troops in the War of the Spanish Succession.
- June 11 – Anglo-Dutch forces skirmish with French forces before the walls of Nijmegen and prevent its fall.
- June 15 – Queen Anne's Captain-General, John Churchill, forces the surrender of Kaiserswerth on the Rhine after a siege that began on April 18.
- June 16 – The English East India Company founds a settlement on Pulo Condore (modern-day Côn Sơn Island) off the coast of southern Vietnam as an entrepôt for ships travelling between India and China.
- June 25 – The premiere of the opera L'Offendere per amore overo la Telesilla by Johann Joseph Fux takes place in Vienna.

=== July–September ===
- July 19 (July 8 O.S.; July 9 Swedish calendar) – Great Northern War: Battle of Klissow – Charles XII of Sweden decisively defeats the Polish–Lithuanian-Saxon army.
- July 23 – The first performance of the opera Médus, roi des Mèdes by François Bouvard takes place at the Paris Opera.
- July 24
  - Camisard hostilities begin in France with the assassination at le Pont-de-Montvert of a local embodiment of royal oppression, François Langlade, the Abbé of Chaila.
  - A total eclipse of the sun is visible on a path crossing the northern Pacific Ocean and Central America.
- July 30 (July 19 O.S.; July 20 Swedish calendar) – Great Northern War: Battle of Hummelshof – Russia defeats Sweden.
- August 11 – Great Northern War: Częstochowa, Poland, is captured by the Swedish army.
- August 15 – War of the Spanish Succession: Battle of Luzzara – Forces of the Holy Roman Empire fail to break through the French-Savoyard position in Lombardy.
- September 12 – The Siege of Landau (War of the Spanish Succession) ends after 3 months with forces of the Holy Roman Empire capturing the fortress town in the Rhineland-Palatinate from a French garrison.
- September 19 – Jupiter occults Neptune.
- September 25 – General John Churchill forces the surrender of Venlo on the Meuse River.
- September 30 – War of the Spanish Succession: Battle of Cádiz – A month-long Anglo-Dutch amphibious operation under English Admiral Sir George Rooke fails to take the Spanish port.

=== October–December ===
- October 1 – The founding deed of the University of Wrocław is signed by the Holy Roman Emperor Leopold I of the House of Austria, King of Hungary and Bohemia.
- October 7 – Great Northern War: Russian troops besiege the Swedish fortress of Nöteborg, and capture it after 15 days.
- October 14 – War of the Spanish Succession: Battle of Friedlingen – France defeats forces of the Holy Roman Empire.
- October 18 – Queen Anne's War: Battle of Flint River – Spanish and Apalachee Indian forces fail in their attack against Creek Indians, supported by English traders, in the modern-day U.S. state of Georgia.
- October 19 – The opera Der Sieg der fruchtbaren Pomona by Reinhard Keiser is premiered at the Hamburg Opera for the birthday of King Frederick IV of Denmark.
- October 23 – War of the Spanish Succession:
  - Battle of Vigo Bay – Anglo-Dutch naval forces under English Admiral Sir George Rooke capture the defended Spanish port of Cádiz and take or destroy all the Spanish treasure fleet and escorting French warships there.
  - Churchill forces the surrender of Liège.
- October 27 – Queen Anne's War in North America: English troops plunder St. Augustine, Spanish Florida.
- October 28 – Sieur Juchereau, Lieutenant General of Montréal, establishes the first trading post on the Wabash River in order to trade buffalo hides with American Indians. The site of the trading post may be the modern-day location of Vincennes, Indiana.
- November 7 – The first performance of the opera Tancrède by André Campra takes place at the Théâtre du Palais-Royal in Paris.
- November 10 – Queen Anne's War in North America: The Siege of St. Augustine opens as English forces besiege St. Augustine, Spanish Florida.
- November 15 – The opera La Clemenza d'Augusto by Johann Joseph Fux is premiered in Vienna.
- November 22 – The Dutch East India Company ship Amsterdam (1691) founders en route from Bombay to Basra during a storm with the loss of all hands.
- December 14 – John Churchill is created duke of Marlborough.
- December 30 – Queen Anne's War: The Siege of St. Augustine in Spanish Florida is lifted.

=== Date unknown ===
- The travel diary Oku no Hosomichi ("Narrow road to the deep north"), a major work of haibun by the Japanese poet Matsuo Bashō and one of the major texts of Japanese literature of the Edo period, is published eight years after Bashō's death.
- The Delaware Colony legislature is separated from that of Pennsylvania.
- Richard Bentley at Cambridge in England introduces the first written (as opposed to oral) competitive examinations in a Western university.

== Births ==
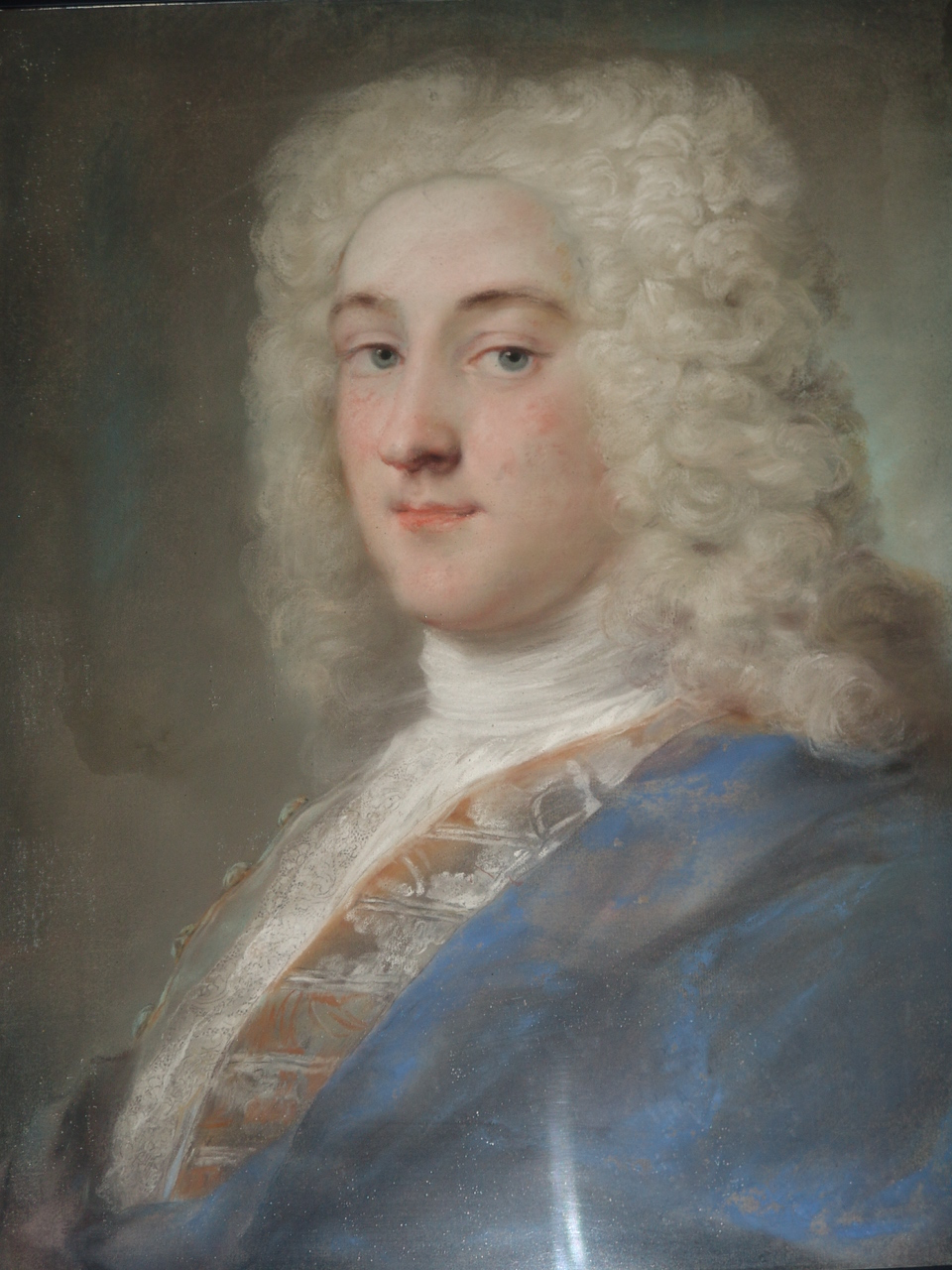
Alan Brodrick, 2nd Viscount Midleton born 31 January

Giovanni Carmine Pellerano born 6 February

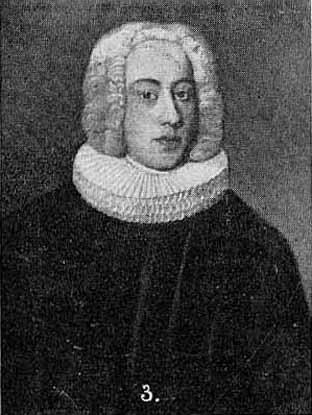
Rasmus Paludan born 26 February

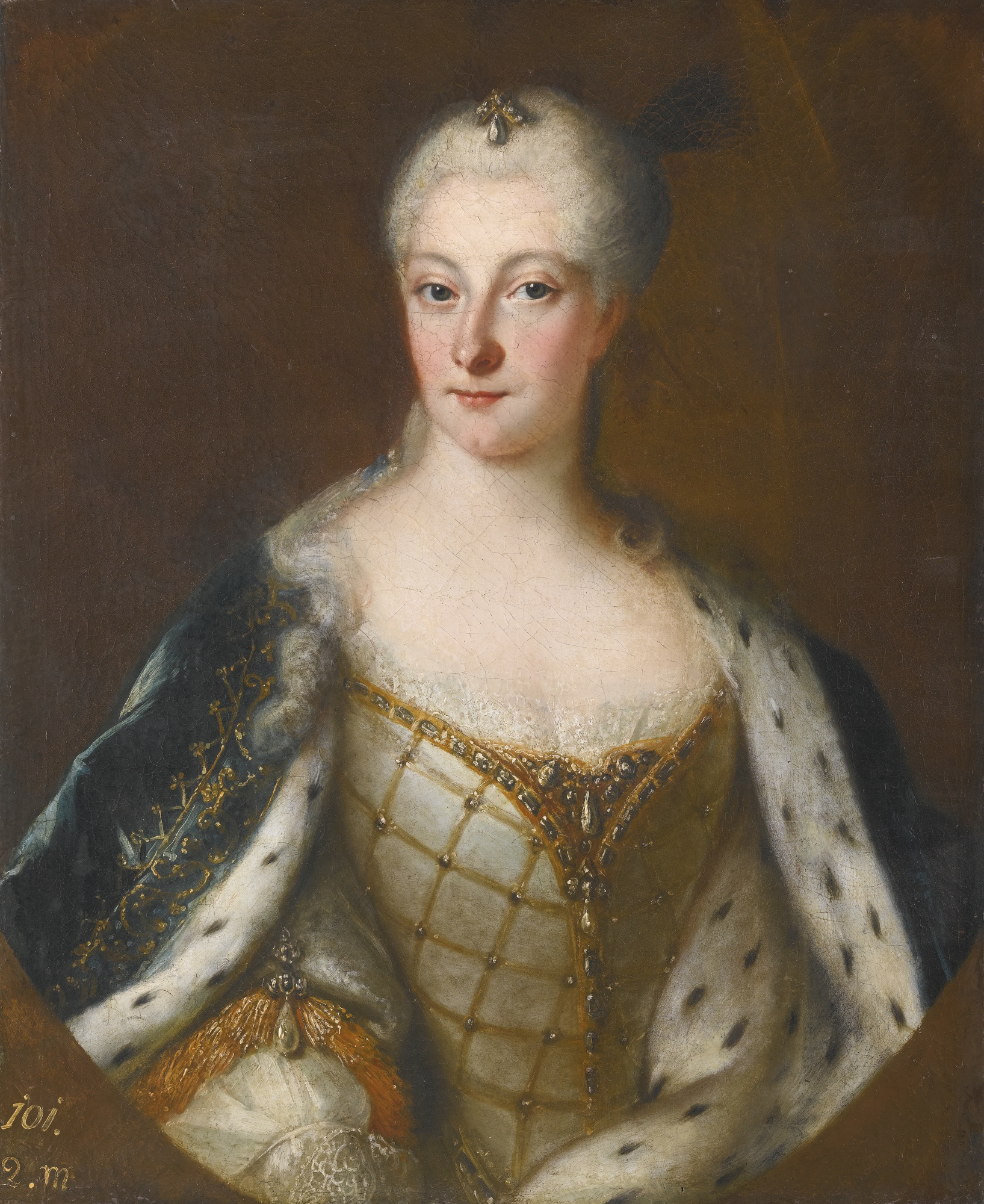
Henrietta Maria of Brandenburg-Schwedt born 2 March

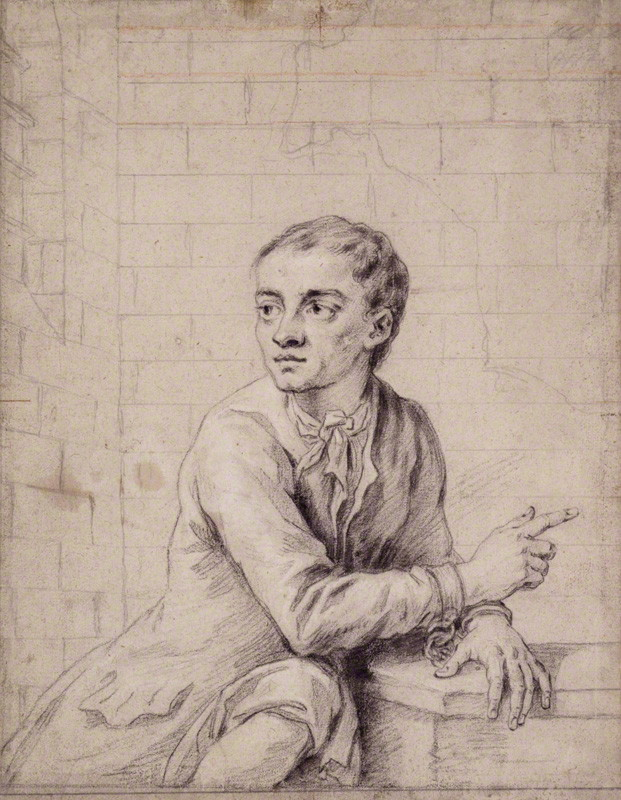
Jack Sheppard born 4 March

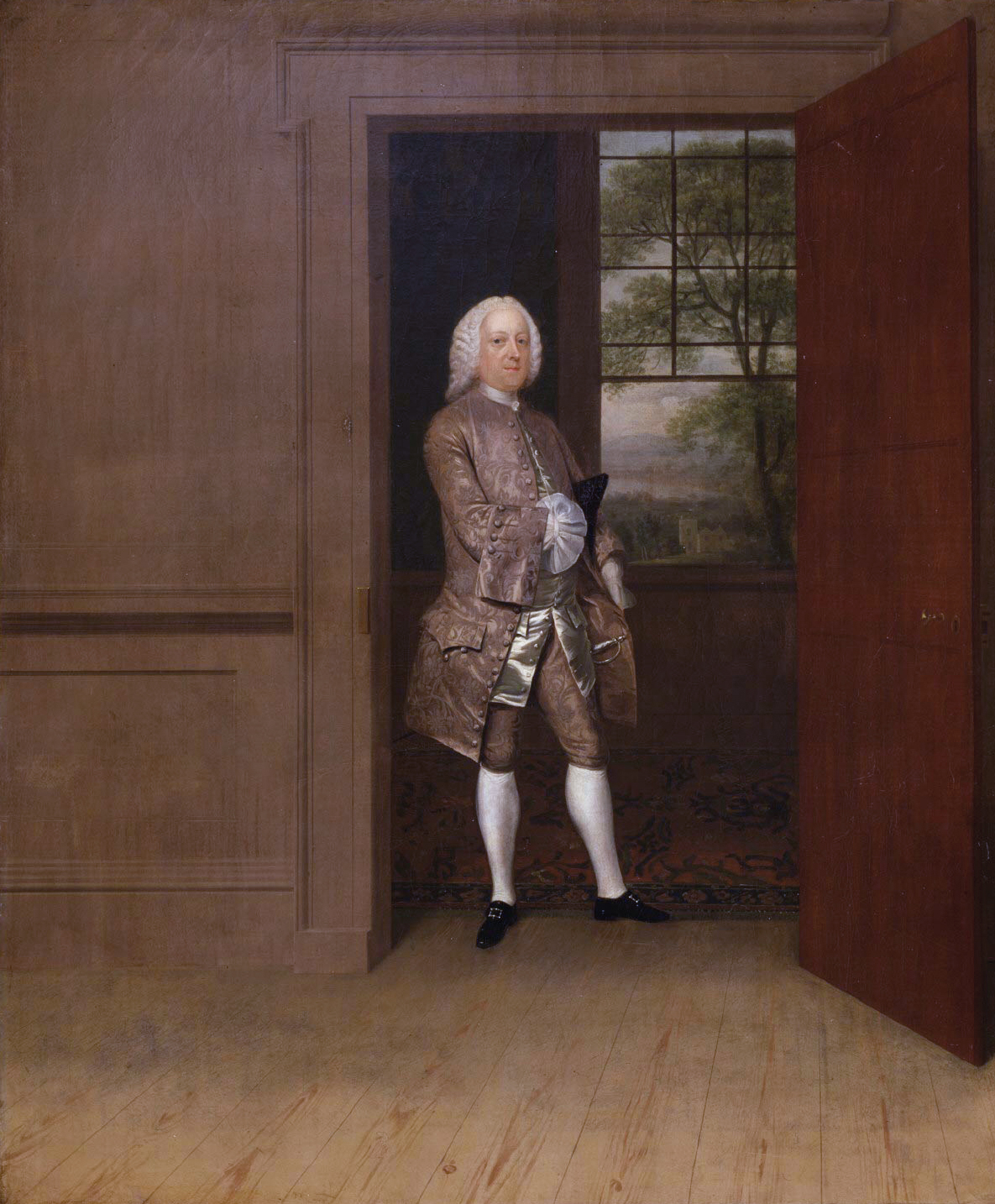
Thomas Penn born 20 March

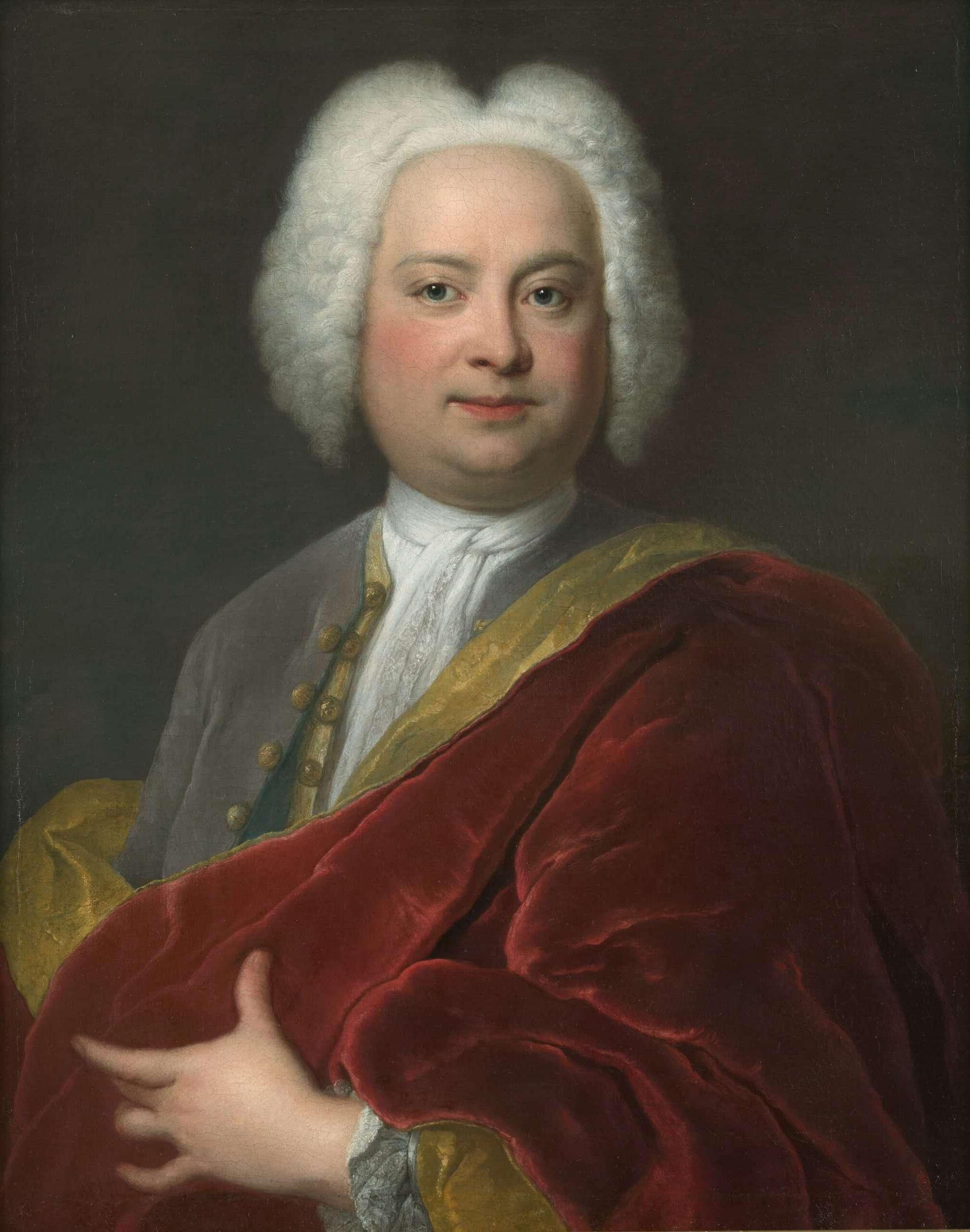
Willem van Keppel, 2nd Earl of Albemarle born 5 June

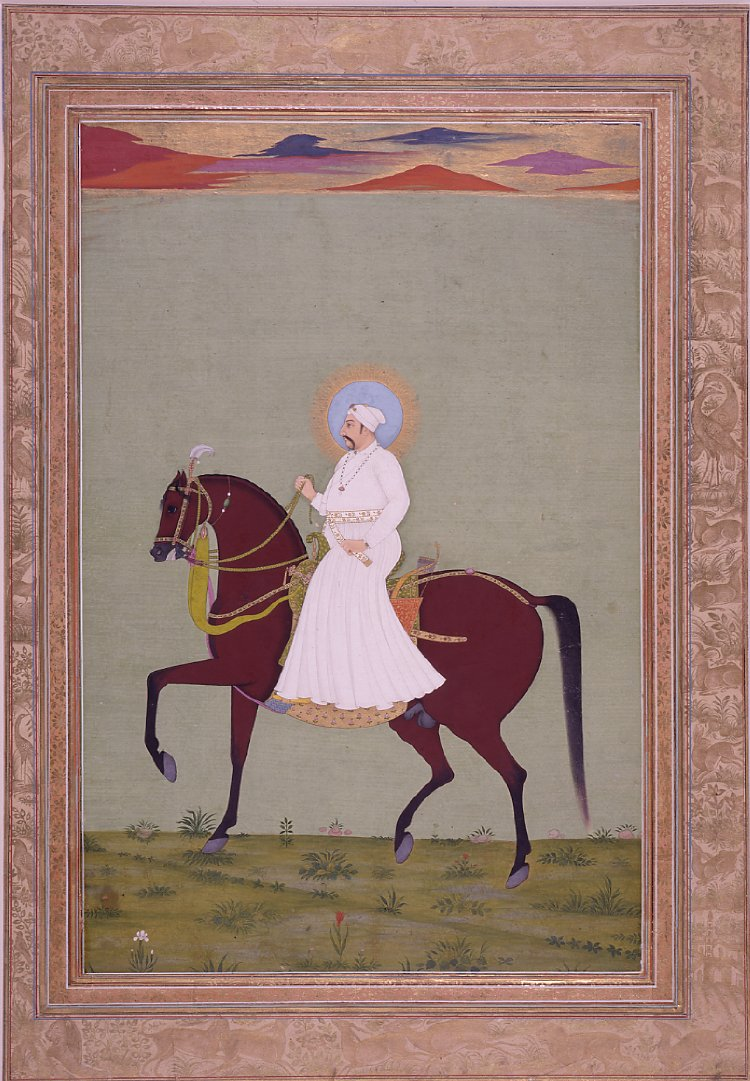
Muhammad Shah born 7 August

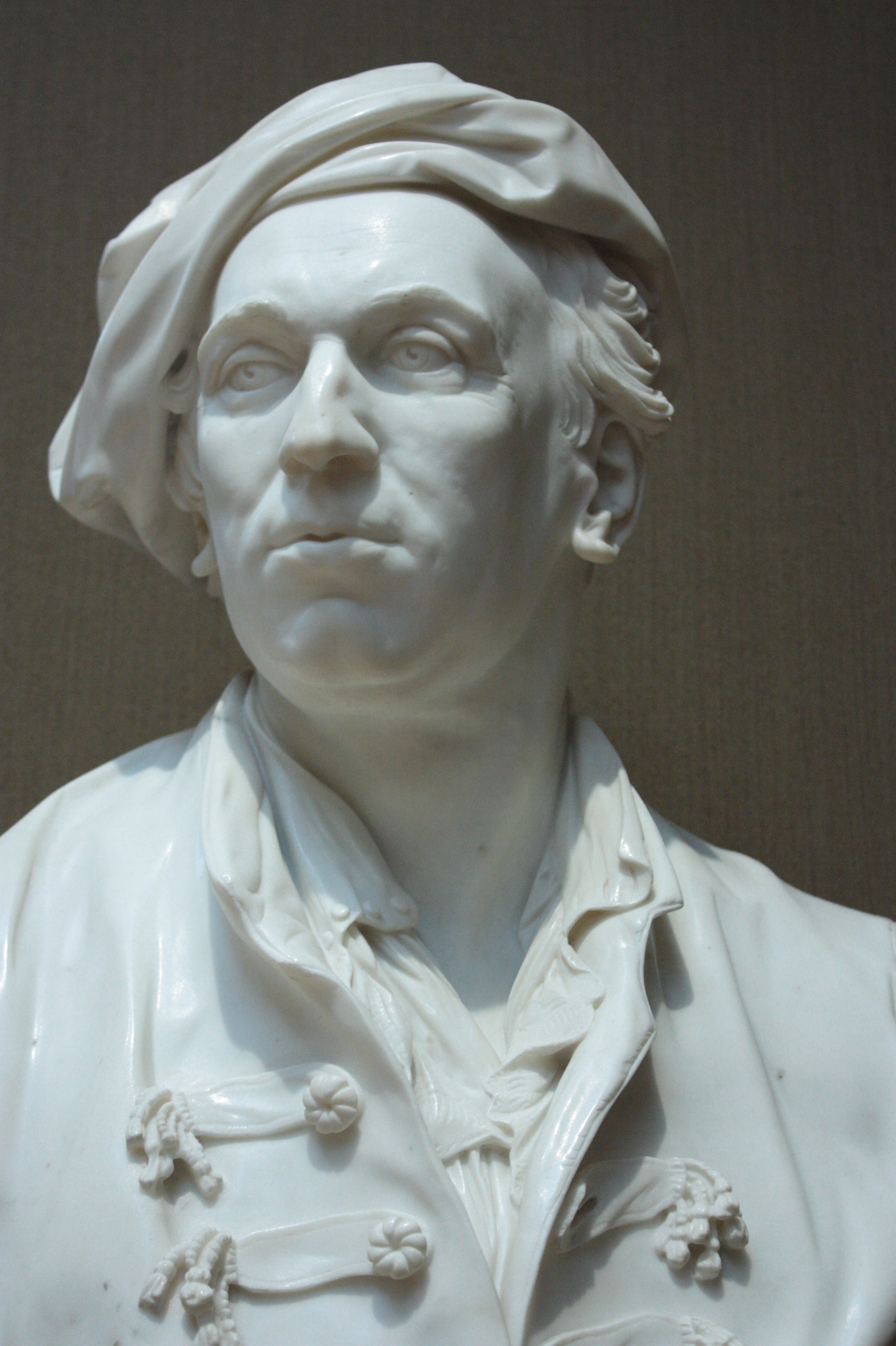
Louis-François Roubiliac born 31 August

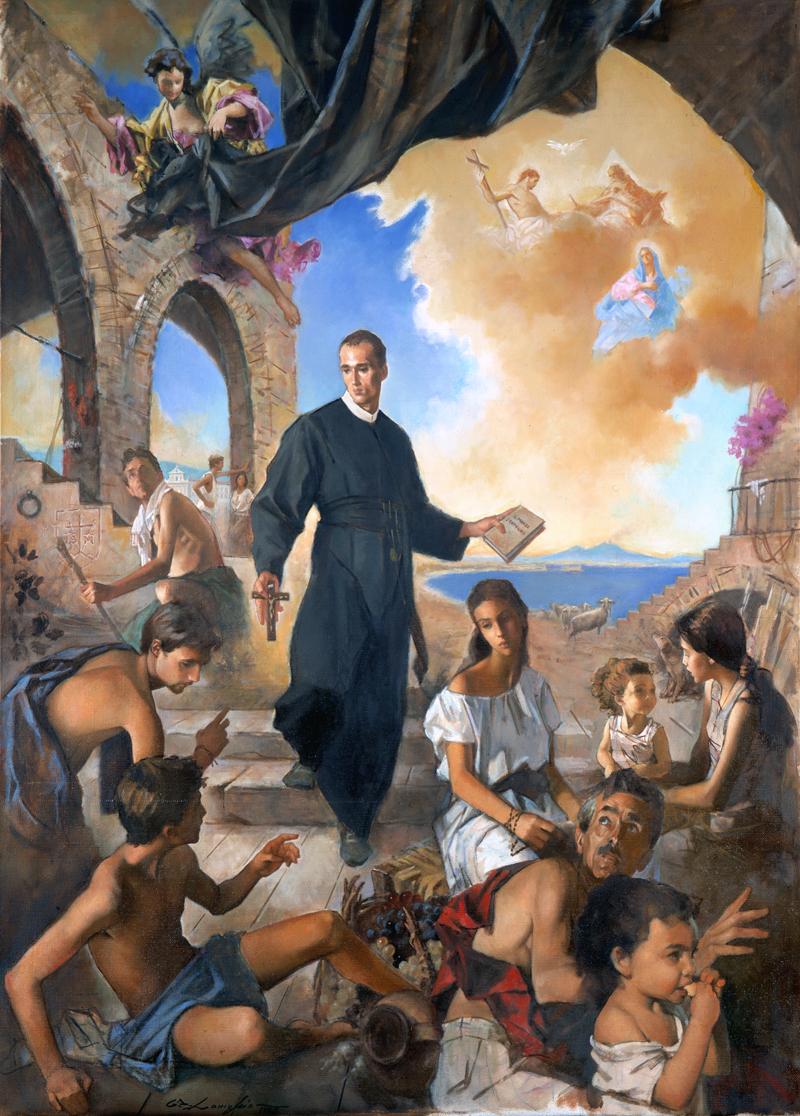
Januarius Maria Sarnelli born 12 September

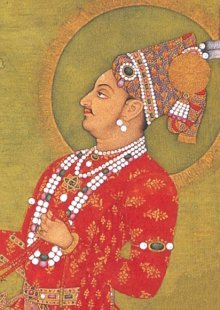
Abhai Singh of Marwar born 7 November

=== January–March ===
- January 2 – Nabeshima Naotsune, Japanese daimyō (d. 1749)
- January 6
  - Johann Adam von Ickstatt, German educator and director of the University of Ingolstadt (d. 1776)
  - José de Nebra, Spanish composer (d. 1768)
- January 10 – Johannes Zick, German fresco painter (d. 1762)
- January 12
  - Jacques Aved, French painter and Rococo portraitist (d. 1766)
  - Józef Andrzej Załuski, Polish Catholic priest (d. 1774)
- January 13 – Thomas Arthur, comte de Lally, French general of Irish Jacobite ancestry (d. 1766)
- January 14 – Emperor Nakamikado, of Japan (d. 1737)
- January 18 – Sava II Petrović-Njegoš, Metropolitan of Cetinje (d. 1782)
- January 24 – Frederica Henriette of Anhalt-Bernburg, member of the House of Ascania by birth and Princess of Anhalt-Köthen by marriage (d. 1723)
- January 26 – Johann Caspar Scheuchzer, Swiss naturalist (d. 1729)
- January 31 – Alan Brodrick, 2nd Viscount Midleton, English cricketer (d. 1747)
- February 3
  - Michael Adelbulner, German mathematician (d. 1779)
  - Giovanni Battista Vaccarini, Italian architect (d. 1768)
- February 6 – Giovanni Carmine Pellerano, Italian Catholic prelate, member of the Knights Hospitaller (d. 1783)
- February 7 – Carl August Thielo, Danish composer (d. 1763)
- February 10
  - Jean-Pierre Guignon, Franco-Italian composer and violinist (d. 1774)
  - Carlo Marchionni, Italian architect (d. 1786)
- February 12 – Robert Hale, Massachusetts physician, soldier (d. 1767)
- February 26 – Rasmus Paludan, Norwegian theologian and priest (d. 1759)
- February 27
  - Enrichetta d'Este, Duchess of Parma (d. 1777)
  - Johann Valentin Görner, German composer (d. 1762)
- March 2
  - Henrietta Maria of Brandenburg-Schwedt, granddaughter of the "Great Elector" Frederick William (d. 1782)
  - Charles Stourton, 15th Baron Stourton, son of Charles Stourton (1669–1739) (d. 1753)
- March 4 – Jack Sheppard, British burglar and escaper (d. 1724)
- March 13 – Burkat Shudi, English harpsichord maker of Swiss origin (d. 1773)
- March 19 – Thomas Penn, son of American colonial leader William Penn (d. 1775)
- March 21 – Bento de Moura Portugal (d. 1766)
- March 22 – Matthias de Visch, Flemish painter of history paintings and portraits (d. 1765)
- March 25 – Pieter Teyler van der Hulst, wealthy Dutch Mennonite merchant and banker (d. 1778)
- March 27 – Johann Ernst Eberlin, German composer and organist (d. 1762)
- March 28 – Ignacio de Luzán, Spanish critic and poet (d. 1754)
- March 29 – Cesare Sportelli, Italian Roman Catholic Redemptorist lawyer (d. 1750)
- March 31 – Barthélemy-Christophe Fagan, French playwright (d. 1755)

=== April–June ===
- April 5
  - Stephen Leake, English numismatist, officer of arms at the College of Arms in London (d. 1773)
  - Solomon Lombard (d. 1781)
- April 7 – William Rawlinson Earle (d. 1774)
- April 10 – Jonathan Tyers (d. 1767)
- April 16 – Juan de Balmaseda y Censano Beltrán (d. 1778)
- April 20 – Zenón de Somodevilla, 1st Marquess of Ensenada, Spanish noble (d. 1781)
- May 2 – Friedrich Christoph Oetinger, German Lutheran theologian and theosopher (d. 1782)
- May 3 – John St John, 2nd Viscount St John (d. 1748)
- May 8 – Andrew Lauder, Burgess of the Royal Burgh of Lauder (1737) (d. 1769)
- May 10 – Abraham Lehn, Danish landowner (d. 1757)
- May 11 – Isaac Greenwood, American mathematician (d. 1745)
- May 12 – Louis Philogène Brûlart, vicomte de Puisieulx, French foreign minister (d. 1770)
- May 16 – George Nevill, 14th Baron Bergavenny (d. 1723)
- May 21 – John Rous, Royal Navy officer during King George's War and the Seven Years' War (d. 1760)
- May 24 – Joseph Friedrich Ernst, Prince of Hohenzollern-Sigmaringen, fifth Prince (d. 1769)
- June 1 – John Hancock Jr., colonial American clergyman, father of politician John Hancock (d. 1744)
- June 5
  - Frederik Arentz, Lutheran bishop of Bjørgvin from 1762 to 1774 (d. 1779)
  - Willem van Keppel, 2nd Earl of Albemarle (d. 1754)
- June 7 – Louis George, Margrave of Baden-Baden from 1707 until his death (d. 1761)
- June 9 – William Townshend, British Member of Parliament (d. 1738)
- June 13 – Michał Kazimierz "Rybeńko" Radziwiłł, Polish-Lithuanian noble (d. 1762)
- June 19 – Frederick Augustus Rutowsky, German general (d. 1764)
- June 26 – Philip Doddridge, English religious leader (d. 1751)
- June 30 – Elizabeth Timothy, colonial American printer and newspaper publisher in South Carolina who worked for Benjamin Franklin (d. 1757)

=== July–September ===
- July 6 – Franz Anton Maichelbeck, German organist and composer (d. 1750)
- July 18 – Maria Clementina Sobieska, Polish noble (d. 1735)
- July 19 – Philemon Ewer, English shipbuilder (d. 1750)
- July 20 – Christian Siegmund Georgi, evangelical theologian at Wittenberg, Germany (d. 1771)
- July 22 – Alessandro Besozzi, Italian composer and virtuoso oboist (d. 1793)
- July 31 – Jean Denis Attiret, French Jesuit missionary and painter (d. 1768)
- August 2 – Dietrich of Anhalt-Dessau, German prince of the House of Ascania (d. 1769)
- August 3
  - Sir Walter Bagot, 5th Baronet (d. 1768)
  - George Rooke, priest (d. 1754)
- August 7 – Muhammad Shah, Mughal emperor of India (d. 1748)
- August 14 – Philip Carteret Webb, English barrister (d. 1770)
- August 16 – Roque Joaquín de Alcubierre, military engineer in the Spanish Army, discovered architectural remains at Pompeii and Herculaneum (d. 1780)
- August 26
  - George Carpenter, 2nd Baron Carpenter, of England (d. 1749)
  - Judith Madan, English poet (d. 1781)
- August 28 – Jean Philippe d'Orléans, illegitimate son of future French regent Philippe d'Orleans (d. 1748)
- August 31 – Louis-François Roubiliac, French sculptor who worked in England (d. 1762)
- September 2 – John Evans, Welsh Anglican cleric (d. 1782)
- September 4 – Legall de Kermeur, French chess player (d. 1792)
- September 6 – Joseph Bonnier de la Mosson, French aristocrat (d. 1744)
- September 12
  - Robert Hazard, Rhode Island colonial deputy governor (d. 1751)
  - Januarius Maria Sarnelli, Beatified Italian (d. 1746)
- September 14
  - Ercole Lelli, Italian painter of the late-Baroque (d. 1766)
  - Adriana Maas, Dutch stage actress (d. 1746)
- September 20 – Francesco Serao, Italian physician (d. 1783)

=== October–December ===
- October 4
  - John Lindsay, 20th Earl of Crawford, British Army general (d. 1749)
  - Honoré Armand de Villars, French nobleman, soldier, politician (d. 1770)
- October 5 – Prince Joseph of Saxe-Hildburghausen, German prince (d. 1787)
- October 22 – Frédéric Maurice Casimir de La Tour d'Auvergne, French prince (d. 1723)
- October 25 – Christoph II von Dohna, Prussian general (d. 1762)
- October 29 – Tako Hajo Jelgersma, Dutch painter (d. 1795)
- November 5 – Grégoire Orlyk, Ukrainian-born French Lieutenant General (d. 1759)
- November 6 – Josias Weitbrecht, German professor of medicine and anatomy in Russia (d. 1747)
- November 7 – Abhai Singh of Marwar, Raja of Marwar (Jodhpur) Kingdom (r (d. 1749)
- November 9 – Jacques-Georges Chauffepié, French biographer, Calvinist minister and preacher (d. 1786)
- November 13 – Dominic Vallarsi, Italian priest (d. 1771)
- November 14 – Francis Gashry (d. 1762)
- November 20
  - Townsend Andrews (d. 1737)
  - Winchcomb Packer (d. 1746)
  - Apollos Rivoire (d. 1754)
- December 14 – Stephen Sewall, judge in colonial Massachusetts (d. 1760)
- December 17
  - Robert Knight, 1st Earl of Catherlough, Member of the British Parliament (d. 1772)
  - Marguerite de Lubert, French woman of letters (d. 1785)
- December 21 – Tommaso Crudeli, Florentine free thinker who was imprisoned by the Roman Inquisition (d. 1745)
- December 22 – Jean-Étienne Liotard, French painter (d. 1789)

=== Date unknown ===
- Margareta Momma, Swedish writer, journalist and editor (d. 1772)
- Giuseppa Barbapiccola, Italian natural philosopher, poet and translator (d. 1740)

== Deaths ==
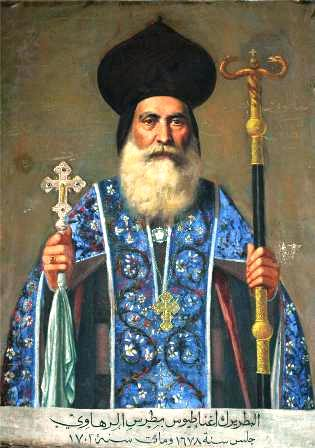
Ignatius Gregory Peter VI Shahbaddin died 4 March

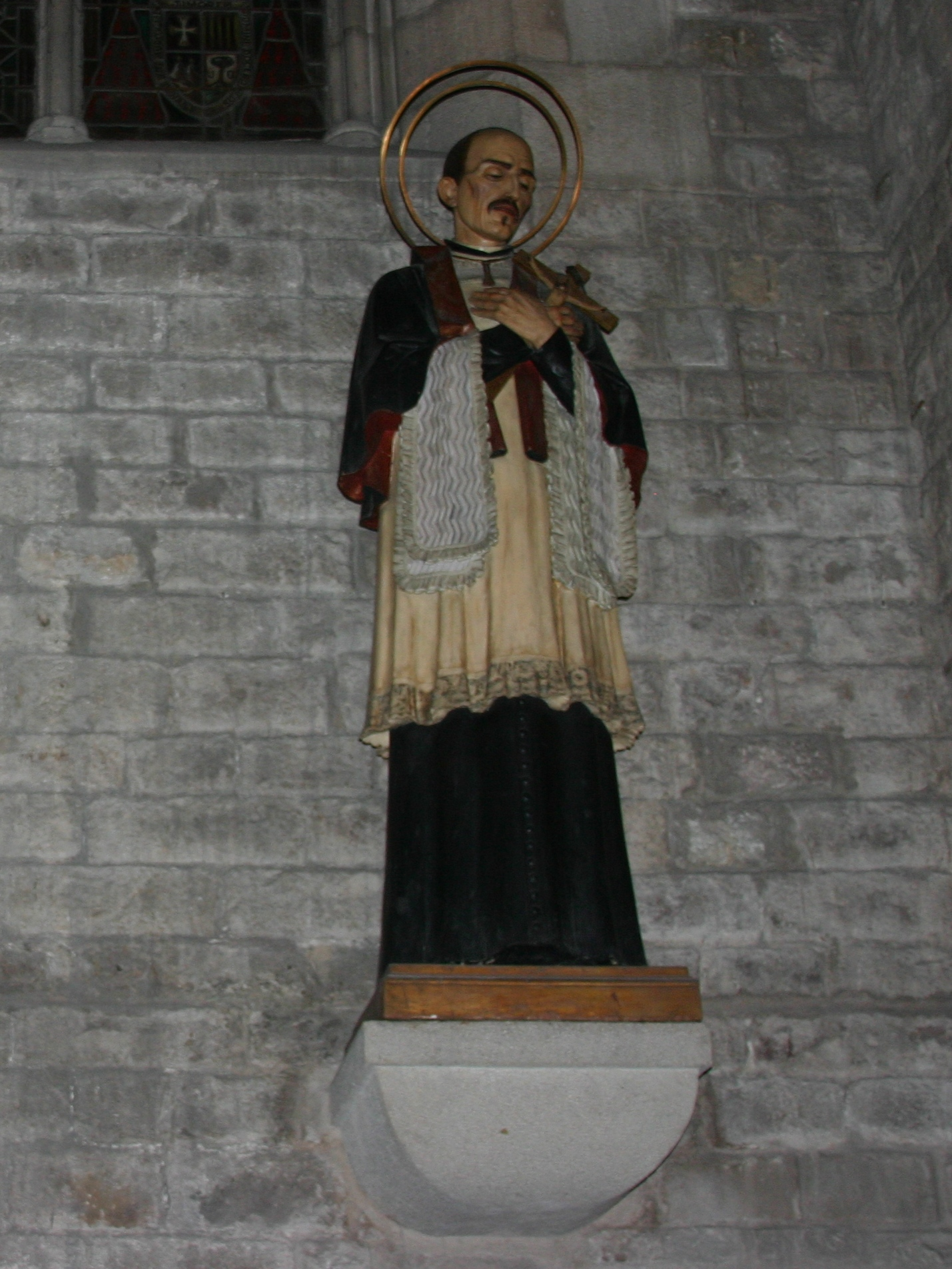
Joseph Oriol died 23 March

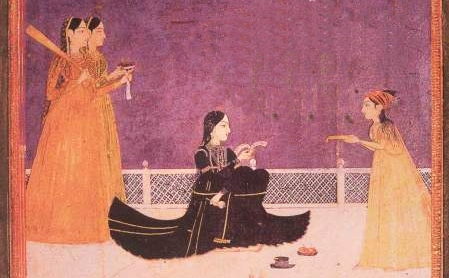
Zeb-un-Nissa died 26 May

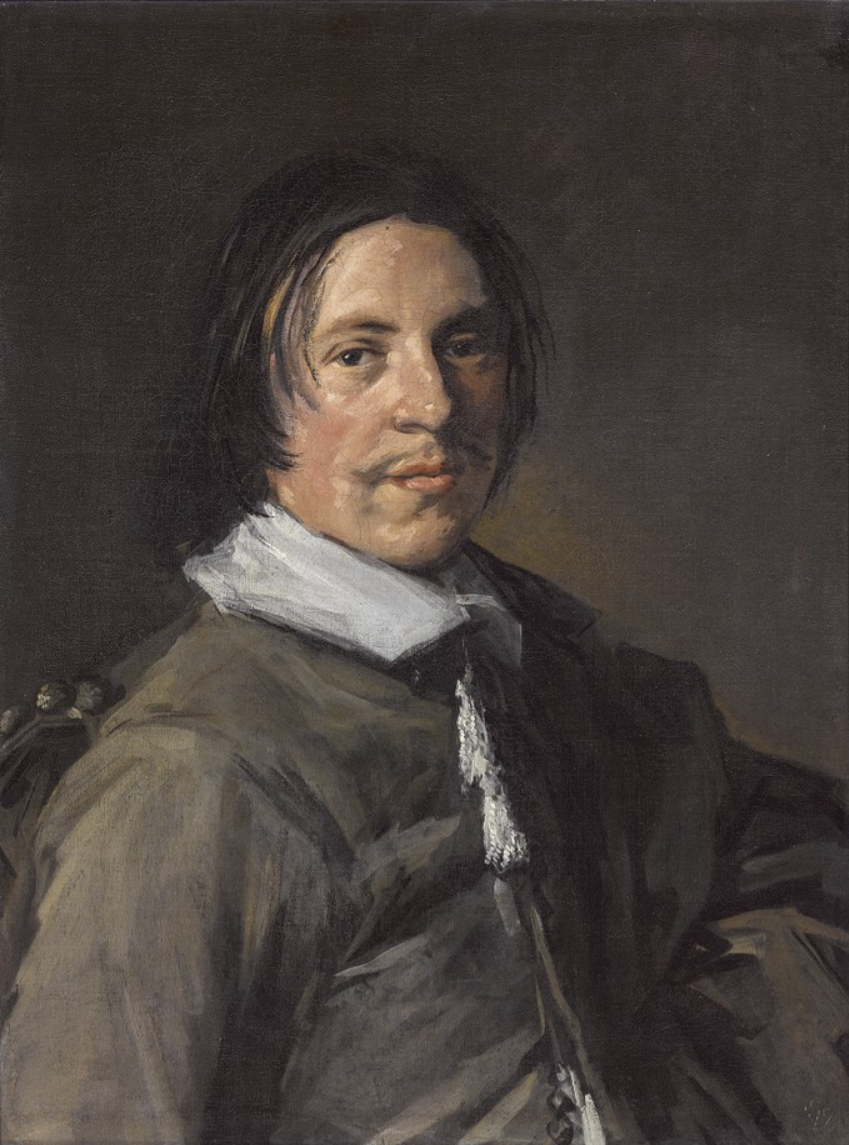
Vincent van der Vinne died 26 July

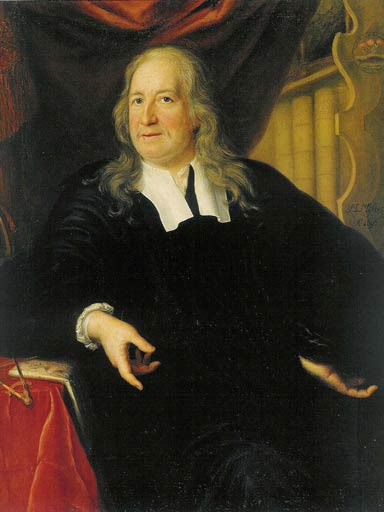
Olaus Rudbeck died 17 September

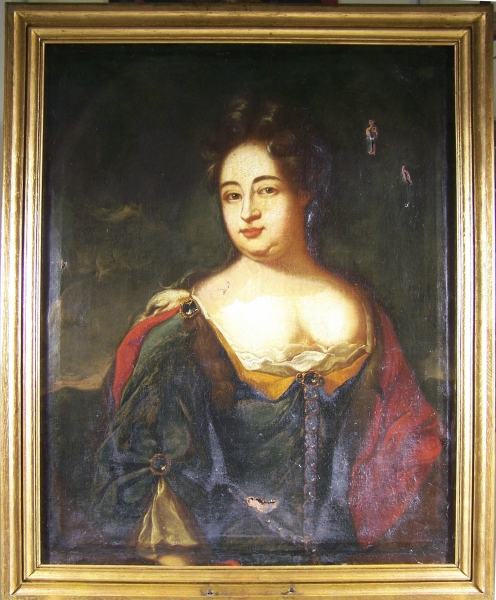
Countess Sophie Henriette of Waldeck died 15 October

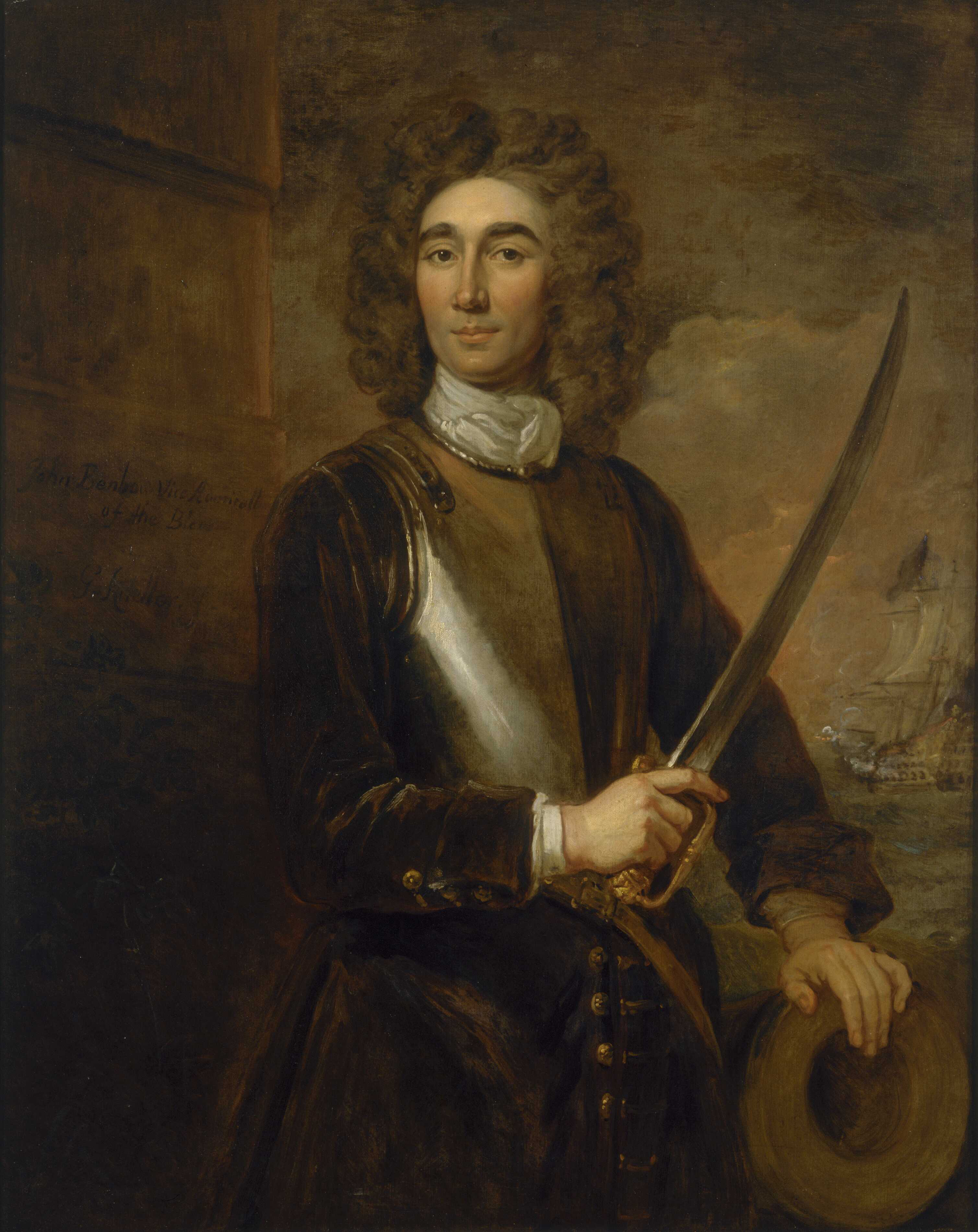
John Benbow died 4 November

- January 2 – Christian Adolf I, Duke of Schleswig-Holstein-Sonderburg-Franzhagen, German nobleman (b. 1641)
- January 7 – Ernst von Trautson, Austrian Roman Catholic clergyman who was Prince-Bishop of Vienna (b. 1633)
- January 17 – Stanisław Herakliusz Lubomirski, Polish noble (b. 1642)
- February 16 – John Milner, English clergyman (b. 1628)
- February 17 – Peder Syv, Danish historian (b. 1631)
- February 27 – Münejjim Bashi, Ottoman astrologer, Sufi, and historian
- March 2 – Giuseppe de Lazzara, Roman Catholic prelate, Bishop of Alife (1676–1702) (b. 1626)
- March 4 – Ignatius Gregory Peter VI Shahbaddin, Patriarch of the Syriac Catholic Church from 1678 to 1702 (b. c. 1641)
- March 8
  - (buried) Jan de Baen, Dutch portrait painter (b. 1633)
  - King William III of England, Scotland and Ireland (b. 1650)
- March 18 – Johannes Rothe, Dutch preacher (b. 1628)
- March 23 – Joseph Oriol, Spanish Catholic priest, saint (b. 1650)
- March 24 – Sir James Clavering, 1st Baronet, English landowner (b. 1620)
- April 2 – Iver Leganger, Norwegian priest, non-fiction writer (b. 1629)
- April 3
  - Sir Henry Goring, 2nd Baronet, English politician (b. 1622)
  - Stanisław Jan Jabłonowski, Polish nobleman (b. 1634)
- April 12 – Paul Mezger, Austrian Benedictine theologian and academic (b. 1637)
- April 20 – Anna Talbot, Countess of Shrewsbury, English countess (b. 1642)
- April 22 – François Charpentier, French archaeologist and man of letters (b. 1620)
- April 23 – Margaret Fell, English Quaker leader (b. 1614)
- April 27
  - Jean Bart, French naval commander and privateer (b. 1650)
  - Emich Christian of Leiningen-Dagsburg, count (b. 1642)
- May 10 – Antonio Gherardi, Italian painter (b. 1638)
- May 14 – Marc Hyacinthe de Rosmadec, French naval officer, appointed governor general of the French Antilles but died before taking office (b. 1635)
- May 17 – Jan Wyck, Dutch military painter (b. 1645)
- May 26 – Zeb-un-Nissa, Mughal princess and poet, imprisoned by her father for the last 20 years of her life (b. 1638)
- May 27 – Dominique Bouhours, French critic (b. 1628)
- June 1 – François Provost, career soldier from France who served in New France in 1665 (b. 1638)
- June 2 – John Moore, Member of Parliament for the City of London (b. 1620)
- June 7 – Benedetto Giacinto Sangermano, Roman Catholic prelate, Bishop of Nusco (1680–1702) (b. 1638)
- June 20
  - John Leyburn, English Roman Catholic bishop, Vicar Apostolic of England (b. 1615)
  - Ippolito Vicentini, Roman Catholic prelate, Bishop of Rieti (1670–1702) (b. 1638)
- July 12 – Nanbu Shigenobu, Edo period Japanese samurai (b. 1616)
- July 19 – Frederick IV, Duke of Holstein-Gottorp (b. 1671)
- July 26 – Vincent van der Vinne, Dutch Mennonite painter (b. 1628)
- August 1 – Sir William Courtenay, 1st Baronet, English politician (b. 1628)
- August 8 – Callinicus II of Constantinople, Ecumenical Patriarch of Constantinople (b. 1630)
- August 14 – Louis Thomas, Count of Soissons and Prince of Savoy (b. 1657)
- August 15 – Charles, Prince of Commercy, French field marshal (b. 1661)
- September 11 – Sir Robert Southwell, English diplomat (b. 1635)
- September 12 – Alfonso Basilio Ghetaldo, Roman Catholic prelate, Bishop of Stagno (1694–1702) (b. 1647)
- September 17 – Olaus Rudbeck, Swedish architect (b. 1630)
- September 20 – William Campion, English politician (b. 1640)
- September 28 – Robert Spencer, 2nd Earl of Sunderland, English statesman (b. 1641)
- October 14 – Franz Anton, Count of Hohenzollern-Haigerloch (b. 1657)
- October 15
  - Frances Stewart, Duchess of Richmond, famous for refusing to become a mistress of Charles II of England (b. 1647)
  - Countess Sophie Henriette of Waldeck, Duchess of Saxe-Hildburghausen (b. 1662)
- October 16 – Francesco Casati, Roman Catholic prelate, Titular Archbishop of Trapezus (1670–1702) (b. 1620)
- October 17
  - François Genet, Roman Catholic prelate, Bishop of Vaison (1686–1702) (b. 1640)
  - Walrad, Prince of Nassau-Usingen, German prince and founder of the line of Nassau-Usingen (b. 1636)
- October 22 – Guy Aldonce de Durfort de Lorges, French noble and soldier (b. 1630)
- October 27 – Niccolò Radulovich, Roman Catholic cardinal (b. 1627)
- November 2 – Andrés de las Navas y Quevedo, Roman Catholic prelate, Bishop of Santiago de Guatemala (1682–1702) (b. 1632)
- November 4 – John Benbow, English officer in the Royal Navy (b. 1653)
- November 5 – William Stanley, 9th Earl of Derby (b. 1655)
- November 13 – Dudley Bradstreet, American magistrate, Justice of the Peace of Andover (b. 1648)
- November 26 – Gerrit de Heere, Governor of Dutch Ceylon during its Dutch period (b. 1657)
- November 29 – Nanbu Yukinobu, early to mid-Edo period Japanese samurai (b. 1642)
- December 8
  - Christopher Comstock, early settler of Norwalk (b. 1635)
  - Philippe, Chevalier de Lorraine, French nobleman and member of the House of Guise (b. 1643)
  - Bartolomeo Riberi, Roman Catholic prelate, Bishop of Nicotera (1691–1702) (b. 1640)
- December 16 – Henry FitzJames, illegitimate son of King James II of England and VII of Scotland by Arabella Churchill (b. 1673)
- December 26 – Fitton Gerard, 3rd Earl of Macclesfield, English politician, earl (b. 1663)
