= Battle of the Frigidus =

394 AD battle between Theodosius and Eugenius

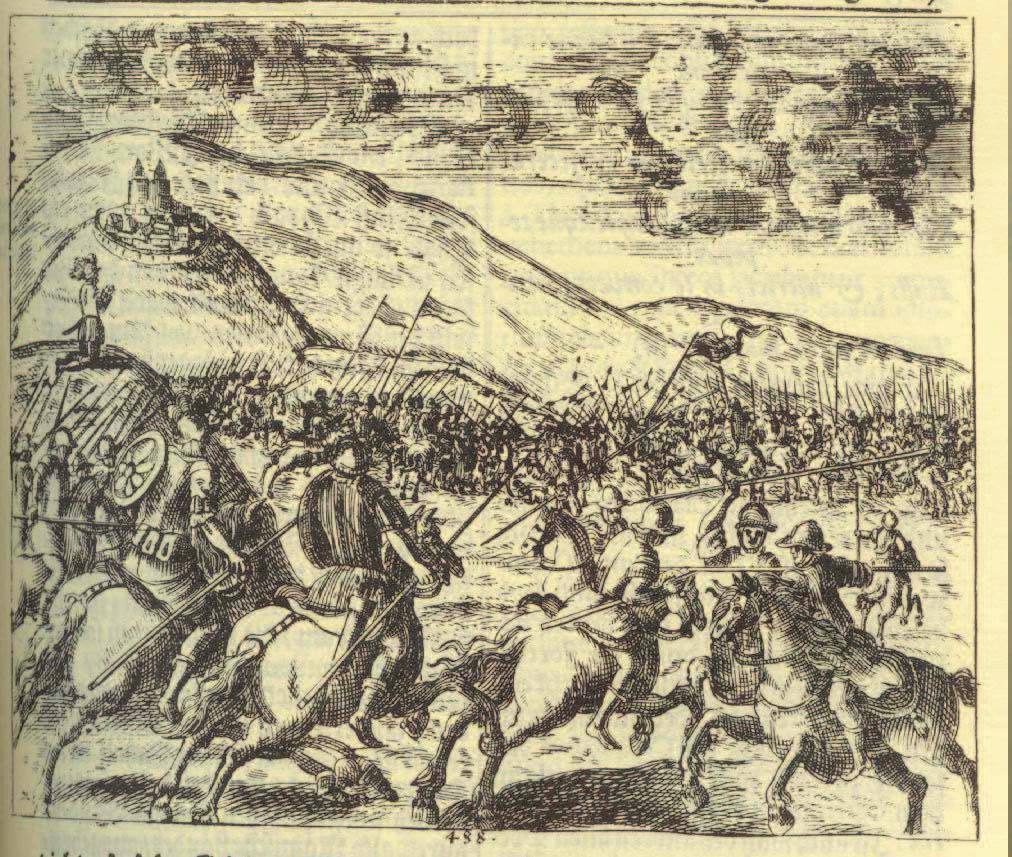
- Battle of the Frigidus by Johann Weikhard von Valvasor (1689)
Date	5–6 September 394
Location	near the Frigidus river (probably the Vipava in what is now western Slovenia) 45°52′13″N 13°56′10″E
Result	Theodosian victory
Territorial changes	Theodosius gains Western Empire

Belligerents
(Byzantine Empire) Eastern Roman Empire; Visigoths	Western Roman Empire

Commanders and leaders
(Byzantine Empire) Theodosius I (Byzantine Empire) Timasius (Byzantine Empire) Stilicho (Byzantine Empire) Bacurius †; Alaric I Gainas	Eugenius (executed); Arbogast †

Units involved
	Herculiani seniores

Strength
20,000–30,000 Romans; 20,000 Goths	35,000–50,000, about the same as Eastern Romans

Casualties and losses
Heavy; 10,000 Goths	Heavy
- Location of the battle within Slovenia Battle of the Frigidus (Alps)

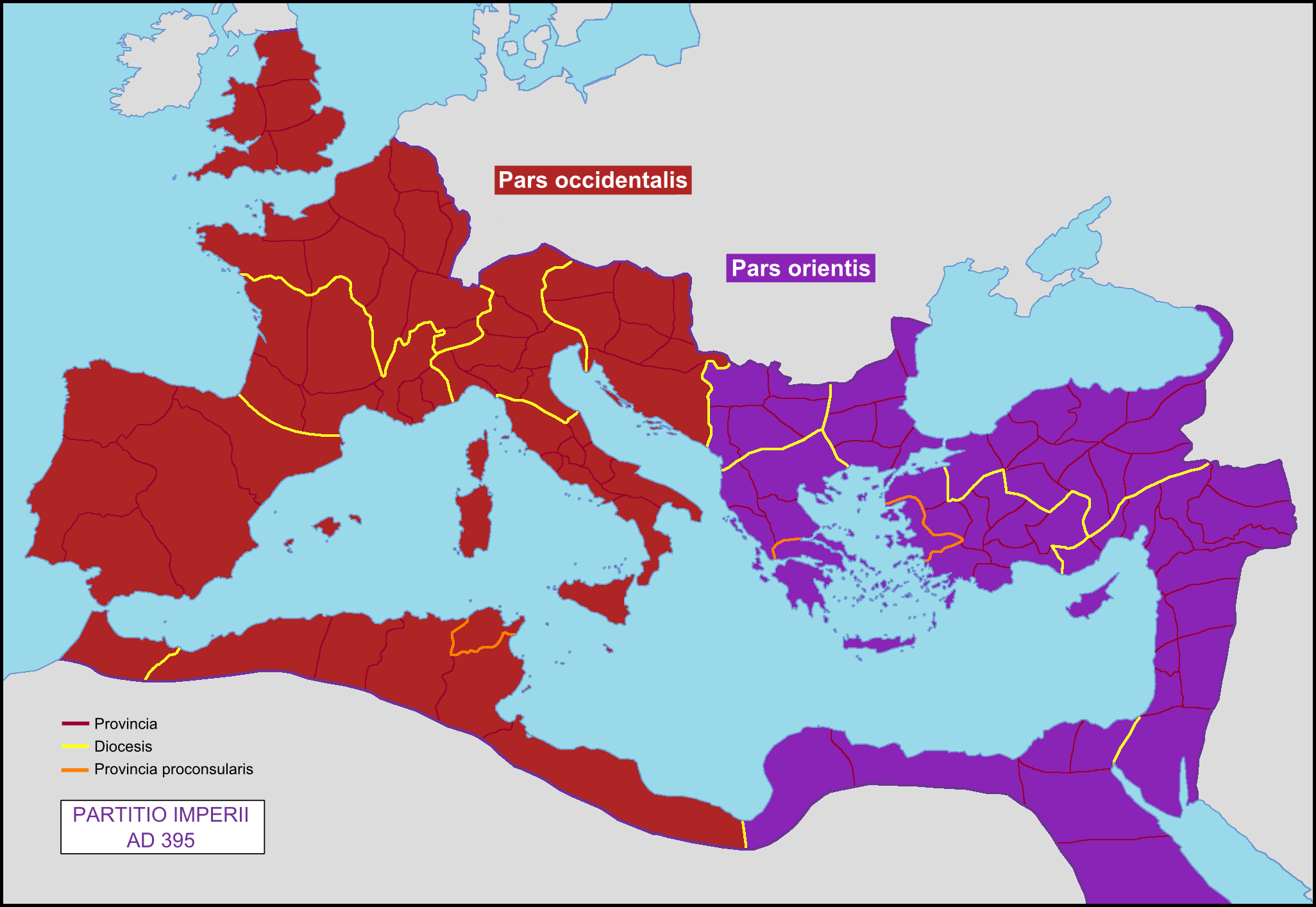
The Roman Empire in late 395, after the East's transfer of the Diocese of Pannonia (east of Italy) to the Western Empire. In 394, at the time of the battle, this diocese was still part of the Eastern empire.

The Battle of the Frigidus, also called the Battle of the Frigid River, was fought on 5 and 6 September 394 between the armies of the Roman emperor Theodosius the Great and the rebel augustus Eugenius (r. 392–394), in the eastern border of Roman Italy. Theodosius won the battle and defeated the usurpation of Eugenius and Arbogast, restoring unity to the Roman Empire. The battlefield, in the Claustra Alpium Iuliarum near the Julian Alps through which Theodosius's army had passed, was probably in the Vipava Valley – with the Frigidus River being the modern Vipava – or possibly in the valley of the Isonzo.

Timasius, the magister militum, commanded the Theodosian army with help from the magister utriusque militiae Stilicho. Arbogast, previously the magister militum under Theodosius's brother-in-law and senior co-emperor Valentinian II (r. 375–392), commanded Eugenius's forces. It was Arbogast who had engineered Eugenius's acclamation after Valentinian's mysterious death. With reinforcements from Theodosius's allies among the Goths led by Alaric and Gainas, and from Bacurius the Iberian, Theodosius's army defeated Eugenius's, and Eugenius was captured and executed. Arbogast killed himself after the battle. The fighting ended the third civil war of Theodosius's reign, after the two fought against Magnus Maximus (r. 383–388).

In ecclesiastical history, the battle was remembered as the last to involve an augustus who was a devotee of Roman paganism, though in fact Eugenius was not a pagan. The posthumous accusation of paganism was first levelled by Tyrannius Rufinus to enhance the reputation of Theodosius I, who was a vigorous promoter of Nicene Christianity and the state church of the Roman Empire. Church histories attributed Theodosius's victory at the Frigidus to divine intervention, and Rufinus equated its importance with the Battle of the Milvian Bridge won by Constantine the Great over Maxentius in 312.

== Background ==
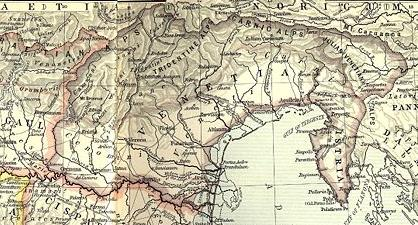
Map showing the "Frigidus River" north east of Aquileia

On 15 May 392, the western emperor, Valentinian II, was found dead at his residence in Vienne, Gaul. His magister militum, Arbogast, informed Theodosius, the eastern emperor and Valentinian's brother-in-law, that the young emperor had committed suicide. Tensions between the two-halves of the empire were heightened further that summer. Arbogast made several attempts to contact Theodosius, but apparently none got further than the ears of the Eastern praetorian prefect, or chief minister, Rufinus. The responses that Arbogast received from Rufinus were unhelpful. Theodosius himself was slowly coming to the belief that Valentinian had been murdered, in no small part because his wife Galla was convinced her brother's death was caused by treachery. For his part, Arbogast had few friends in the Eastern court, although his uncle Richomeres was chief commander of the eastern cavalry. As it appeared increasingly likely that whatever course Theodosius decided upon would be hostile towards Arbogast, the Frank decided to make the first move.

On 22 August, Arbogast elevated Eugenius, the Western imperial court's magister scrinii, or senior civil servant, to the throne of the Western Empire. Eugenius was a well-respected scholar of rhetoric, and a native Roman, making him a far more acceptable candidate for the purple than the Frankish commander. His accession was backed by the praetorian prefect of Italy, Nicomachus Flavianus. Some senators, notably Symmachus, were uneasy with this action. In addition there was the issue of Valentinian's death, which had never been resolved to his satisfaction. Furthermore, Eugenius had removed most of the high civil officers left by Theodosius when he had given the Western half of the empire to Valentinian, so that Theodosius had lost control of the Western Roman Empire. When a party of Western ambassadors arrived in Constantinople to request that Eugenius be acknowledged as the Western augustus, Theodosius was noncommittal, even if he received them with presents and vague promises. Whether he had already decided on an offensive against Eugenius and Arbogast at this point is unclear. In the end, however, after declaring his son Honorius, then eight years old, as the western augustus in January of 393, Theodosius finally resolved to invade the West.

== Campaign preparation ==
Over the following year and a half Theodosius marshalled his forces for the invasion. The Eastern armies had atrophied since the death of the Emperor Valens and most of his soldiers at the Battle of Adrianople. It fell upon the generals Flavius Stilicho and Timasius both to restore discipline to the legions and to bring them back up to strength through recruitment and conscription.

At the same time another of Theodosius's advisers, the eunuch Eutropius, was sent out from Constantinople to seek the advice and wisdom of an aged Christian monk in the Egyptian town of Lycopolis. According to the accounts of the meeting given by Claudian and Sozomen, the old monk prophesied that Theodosius would achieve a costly but decisive victory over Eugenius and Arbogast.

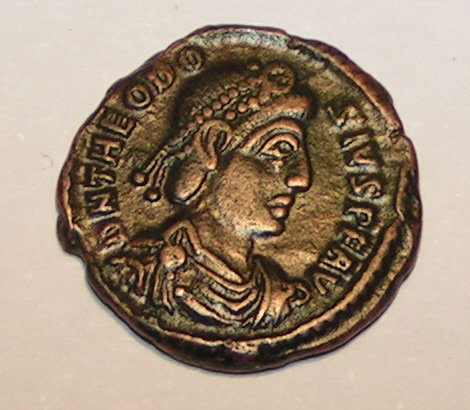
Theodosius I.

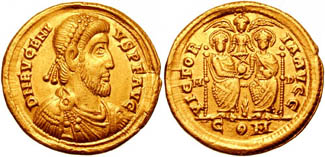
Solidus of Eugenius, showing both him and Theodosius enthroned on the reverse, each crowned by Victory and together holding an orb. Marked: victoria augg ("the Victory of the Augusti").

The Eastern army set out towards the west from Constantinople in May 394. The re-galvanized legions were bolstered by numerous barbarian auxiliaries including over 20,000 Visigoth federates and additional forces from Syria. Theodosius himself led the army; among his commanders were his own generals Stilicho and Timasius, the Visigoth chieftain Alaric, and a Caucasian Iberian named Bacurios Hiberios.

Their advance through Pannonia until the Julian Alps was unopposed, and Theodosius and his officers must have had suspicions about what lay ahead when they discovered that the eastern ends of the mountain passes were undefended. Arbogast had, based on his experiences fighting against the usurper Magnus Maximus in Gaul, decided that the best strategy was to keep his forces united to defend Italy itself, and to that end he went so far as to leave the Alpine passes unguarded. Arbogast's forces consisted mainly of his fellow Franks, Alemanni, and Gallo-Romans, plus his own Gothic auxiliaries.

Thanks to Arbogast's strategy of maintaining a single, relatively cohesive force, the Theodosian army passed unhindered through the Alps and descended towards the valley of the Frigidus River to the east of the Roman port of Aquileia. It was in this narrow, mountainous region that they came upon the Western army's encampment within the Claustra Alpium Iuliarum in the first days of September.

== Battle ==
It is uncertain exactly where the battle took place. Though it has been claimed that the location of the battle should be sought in the Upper Isonzo Valley, it has mostly been placed somewhere in the Vipava Valley. Whereas the "Frigidus" has been usually considered to be the Vipava river or Hubelj creek and the battle to take place near Vrhpolje, recent research suggests that it actually took place some kilometers away, between Col and Sanabor in the so called Door to Roman Italia.

On the first day of battle Theodosius attacked almost immediately, having undertaken little to no prior reconnaissance of the field of battle. He committed his Gothic allies to action first, perhaps hoping to thin their ranks through attrition and lessen their potential threat to the Empire. The Eastern army's headlong attack resulted in heavy casualties but little gain: 10,000 of the Gothic auxiliaries are reported to have been slain, and the Georgian general Bacurius was among the dead.

Day's end saw Eugenius celebrating his troops' successful defense of their position while Arbogast sent out detachments to close off the mountain passes behind Theodosius's forces.

After a sleepless night, Theodosius was cheered by the news that the men Arbogast had sent to bottle him up in the valley intended to desert to his side. Buoyed by this favorable development, Theodosius' men attacked once again. This time nature was on their side as a fierce tempest—apparently the bora, a regular occurrence in the region—blew along the valley from the east. Other stories tell of Theodosius praying to God for a storm, which God subsequently granted.

The high winds blew clouds of dust into the faces of the Western troops (legend also says that the fierce winds even blew the Western troops' own arrows back at them). Buffeted by the winds, Arbogast's lines broke and Theodosius gained the decisive victory that the Egyptian monk had prophesied.

In the aftermath, Eugenius was captured and brought before the emperor. His pleas for mercy went unanswered and he was beheaded. Arbogast escaped the defeat and fled into the mountains, but after a few days' wandering, he concluded escape was impossible and committed suicide.

== Religious character of the conflict ==
While the version of the battle in which a divine wind defeated the pagan enemies of Theodosius became popular in late antiquity, modern historians, most notably Alan Cameron, have disputed the reliability of this version of events. Cameron asserts that the idea that Eugenius and Arbogastes were pagans or supporters of pagans was created to justify Theodosius' campaign against them, and that other usurpers, such as Magnentius, were falsely branded as pagans after their defeat. The idea that Theodosius' enemies were pagans originates in the church historian Rufinus, and only the sources dependent on Rufinus mention this idea.

In addition, the earliest source to mention the decisive bora wind was Ambrose of Milan, but he states in his sermon on Psalm 36 that the wind blew before that battle, and demoralized Theodosius' enemy before any fighting began. This idea was probably picked up by the poet Claudian, who, in his fanciful and propagandistic poetry for the Theodosian family, moved the wind to the decisive moment of the battle. Claudian seems to have been making a classicizing allusion to Silius Italicus, whose account of the Battle of Cannae mentioned a similar wind blowing spears and weapons back. From Claudian's poetry, which was popular in both eastern and western halves of the Roman Empire, the idea of the bora wind deciding the battle spread. It fit well with the other idea that the battle was one between pagans and Christians: Theodosius, as the Christian emperor, was aided by God in the form of the wind.

Historian Michele Renee Salzman explains that "two newly relevant texts — John Chrysoston's Homily 6, adversus Catharos (PG 63: 491-92) and the Consultationes Zacchei et Apollonii, re-dated to the 390s, reinforce the view that religion was not the key ideological element in the events at the time". According to Maijastina Kahlos, Finnish historian and Docent of Latin language and Roman literature at the University of Helsinki, the notion of pagan aristocrats united in a "heroic and cultured resistance" who rose up against the ruthless advance of Christianity in a final battle near Frigidus in 394, is a romantic myth.

== Aftermath ==
It had been a costly victory for Theodosius and a total loss for Eugenius. A contemporary Roman historian stated that since the Goths suffered the bulk of the casualties, Theodosius won two battles at Frigidus, one against Eugenius and the other against the Goths. A mere four months later he died, leaving the government in the hands of his young children Honorius and Arcadius.

However, the battle also accelerated the collapse of the Roman army in the west. The losses at the Battle of the Frigidus weakened the western legions. This downturn in the capabilities of the Roman soldiers meant an increasing reliance by the Empire on barbarian mercenaries employed as foederati, who often proved to be unreliable, or even treacherous.

== Sources ==
=== Primary sources ===
- Rufinius. Historia Ecclesiastica. Vol. 11.

=== Secondary sources ===
- Baynes, Norman H. (1911). H.M.Gwatkin and J.P. Whitney (ed.). The Dynasty of Valentinian and Theodosius the Great. Vol. 1. Cambridge University Press.
- Heather, Peter (2010). Empires and Barbarians: The Fall of Rome and the Birth of Europe. Oxford University Press.
- Kahlos, Maijastina (2019). Religious Dissent in Late Antiquity, 350–450. Oxford University Press. ISBN 978-0-19-006725-0.
- Kohn, George Childs. Dictionary of Wars (Revised ed.).
- Williams, Stephen; Friell, Gerard (1994). Theodosius: The Empire at Bay. Yale University Press. ISBN 978-0-300-07447-5.
- White, Cynthia (2010). The Emergence of Christianity: Classical Traditions in Contemporary Perspective. Fortress Press. ISBN 978-0-8006-9747-1.
