= Frederik Arentz =

Norwegian 18-century Lutheran bishop

- Church: Church of Norway

Personal details
- Born: 5 June 1702
- Died: 22 November 1779 (aged 77)

Frederik Arentz (5 June 1702 in Stadsbygd, Trøndelag – 22 November 1779 in Bergen) was the Lutheran bishop of Bjørgvin from 1762 to 1774.

== Biography ==
Arentz attended the Trondheim Cathedral School and graduated in theology at the University of Copenhagen in 1719. Then he studied in Halle under professor August Hermann Francke and worked as a private teacher until 1727. In 1729, he was appointed as pastor (sogneprest) in Askvoll, in the Diocese of Bergen, until he became a pastor in Nykirken i Bergen in 1760. In 1762, he became bishop of Bjørgvin.

Arentz was the husband of Ludvig Holberg's niece Cathrine Fredrikke Holberg. They had several children, including:

- Hans Arentz (1731–1793), lawyer and sorenskriver in Sunnfjord
- Fredrich Christian Holberg Arentz (1736–1825), theologian and rector of the Bergen Cathedral School.

Other family members include:

- Tiana Elizabeth Arentz (1997-current), Physiotherapist in Victoria, Australia [La Trobe University, 2020). Currently travelling the EU and planning to work in the UK.

== Works ==
- Catechismi Forklaring. Bergen. 1736.
- Melk for Børn : det er: Kort Udlæggelse over de fem Parter i Luthers Catechismus : hvorudi vor Saligheds Orden paa det eenfoldigste og tydeligste er forestillet. Bergen. 1738.
- Passions-Prædiken paa første Mandag i Fasten 1767 holden i Bergens Dom-Kirke. Bergen. 1767.

== Sources ==
- Nogle Vidnesbyrd om Høyædle og Høyærværdige Hr. Friderich Arentz, Fordum Høystfortient Biskop over Bergens Stift, som et Æres Monument paa hans Grav (in Norwegian). Bergen. 1779.
- "Uddrag af Biskop Friedrik Arentz's Visitasberetninger 1764-1770". Theologisk Tidsskrift for den evangelisk-lutherske Kirke i Norge (in Norwegian). Vol. I. Ny Række, B. 5-6. pp. 136–155.
- Bricka, Carl Frederik (1887–1905). "Arentz, Frederik". Dansk Biografisk Leksikon (in Danish). p. 325.
- "Frederik Arentz". NRKs Fylkesleksikon (in Norwegian Bokmål). NRK.
