= Barthélemy-Christophe Fagan =

- Born: 31 March 1702; Paris, France
- Died: 28 April 1755 (aged 53); Paris, France
- Other name: Fagan de Lugny
- Occupation: Playwright

Barthélemy-Christophe Fagan, also known under the pen name Fagan de Lugny, (31 March 1702 – 28 April 1755) was an 18th-century French playwright.

== Biography ==
His father, William Fagan, was a descendant of Irish refugees who fled to France during a period of religious persecution. William served as the King's secretary and controller of the Chancellery and the Wars, but was financially ruined following the collapse of the Law system (système de Law). He subsequently took a more modest position at the consignment office of the Parlement of Paris.

Through his father's influence, Barthélemy-Christophe Fagan secured a clerkship at the same office. At the age of 20, he married a significantly older widow. While working at the Parlement, Fagan developed an interest in the theater and went on to write approximately thirty plays. These works were primarily performed at the Théâtre de la foire, the Théâtre-Italien, and the Théâtre-Français. Fagan died of dropsy in 1755 at age 53.

== Works ==
Theatre

- 1731: La Fausse Ridicule, opéra comique in 1 act and in prose, with Charles-François Panard, Paris, Théâtre-Français, 12 February
- 1733: Le Rendez-vous, ou l'Amour supposé, one-act comedy, in verse, Paris, Théâtre-Français, 27 May Text online
- 1734: La Grondeuse, comedy in 1 act and in prose, Paris, Théâtre-Français, 11 February
- 1734: La Pupille, comedy in 1 act and in prose, Paris, Théâtre-Français, 5 July
- 1735: L'Amitié rivale, fice-act comedy in verse, Paris, Théâtre-Français, 16 NovemberText online
- 1737: Les Originaux, comedy in 1 act and in prose, Paris, Théâtre-Français, 15 July
- 1737: L'Inquiet, comedy in 1 act and in prose, Paris, Théâtre-Français, 15 July
- 1737: Les Caractères de Thalie, three-act comedy with a prologue and a divertissement, Paris, Théâtre-Français, 18 July
- 1737: L'Étourderie, comedy in 1 act and in prose, Paris, Théâtre-Français, 18 July
- 1737: Les Originaux, comedy in 1 act and in prose, Paris, Théâtre-Français, 18 July
- 1739: Le Marié sans le savoir, comedy in 1 act and in prose, Paris, Théâtre-Français, December
- 1740: La Servante justifiée, opéra comique in 1 act and in prose, with Charles-Simon Favart, Paris, Théâtre de l'Opéra-comique, 19 March
- 1740: La Jalousie imprévue, comedy in 1 act and in prose, Théâtre-Italien de Paris, 16 July
- 1740: Joconde, comedy in 1 act and in prose, Paris, Théâtre-Français, 5 November
- 1743: L'Isle des talents, comedy in 1 act and in verse, Théâtre-Italien de Paris, 19 March
- 1744: L'Heureux Retour, comedy in 1 act and in verse, avec Charles-François Panard, Paris, Théâtre-Français, 6 November
- 1745: L'Amante travestie, comedy in 1 act and in verse, Paris, Hôtel de Bourgogne, 13 May
- 1748: La Fermière, three-act comed, in verse, with divertissements and 1 prologue, Théâtre-Italien de Paris, 18 January
- 1753: Les Almanachs, comedy in 1 act and in prose, Paris, Hôtel de Bourgogne, 7 January
- 1760: Théâtre de M. Fagan et autres œuvres du même auteur, 4 vol. Text online : 1 - Théâtre-Français (a) 2 - Théâtre-Français (b) 3 - Théâtre-Italien 4 - Théâtre de la foire

Varia

- 1751: Nouvelles observations au sujet des condamnations prononcées contre les comédiens

== Bibliography ==
- Albert Clerc, Barthélemy-Christophe Fagan, auteur-comique, 1702-1755. Contribution à l'histoire de la comédie en France au XVIIIe siècle, Paris, E. de Boccard, 1933
- Vie de Fagan, in Chefs-d'œuvre de Fagan, Paris, 1789, (p. 1-9)
