= Elizabeth Mallet =

English printer and bookseller

- Occupations: Printer; bookseller
- Years active: 1672–1706
- Notable work: The Daily Courant
- Spouse: David Mallet (m. 1672; died 1683)

Elizabeth Mallet (fl. 1672–1706) was an English printer and bookseller who produced England's first daily newspaper, The Daily Courant.

== Career ==
=== Printed speeches and the family business ===
In 1672, Mallet married David Mallet. During the 1670s and 1680s, she and David dominated the trade in printed speeches given by condemned prisoners before execution at Tyburn ("last dying speeches"), publishing them from Blackhorse Alley in Fleet Street. After her husband died in 1683, she apprenticed their son David to the printing and bookselling trade, and ran two presses. However, her son failed in this enterprise.

Within ten years Mallet was again in charge of the family business, publishing serial news publications such as The New State of Europe (launched 20 September 1701) and sensational tracts.

=== The Daily Courant ===
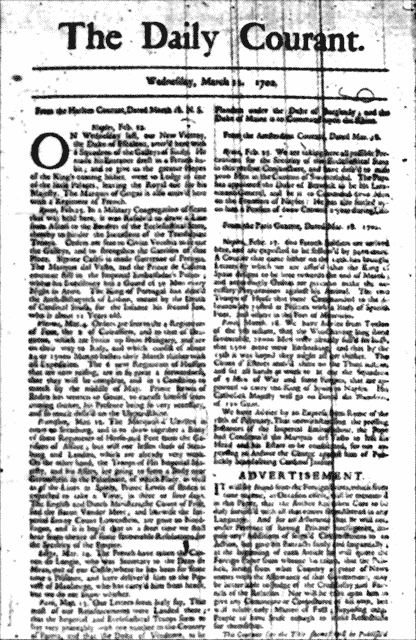
Front page of The Daily Courant

Mallet launched The Daily Courant on 11 March 1702. It was a single newssheet carrying digests of foreign papers. She avoided news from London because publishing it risked government reprisals, and would have been more easily contradicted. Writing under a male name, Mallet claimed only to provide the facts, and to let the reader make up their own minds, saying: "Nor will [the Author] take it upon himself to give any Comments or Conjectures of his own, but will relate only Matter of Fact; supposing other People to have Sense enough to make Reflections for themselves."

== Legacy ==
Some commentators say that Mallet could be called the first editor of a daily newspaper in Britain, although the job title had not yet been invented. Mallet may have also been significant in changing our whole idea of time, contributing to the feeling of speed in modern life. Historians such as Charles Sommerville, Mark Turner and Joel Wiener argue that frequent news changed ideas of time, away from divine planning to an empty, unknowable future.

== See also ==
- List of women printers and publishers before 1800
