= Tyrannius Rufinus =

Monk, historian, and theologian (ca.344–412)

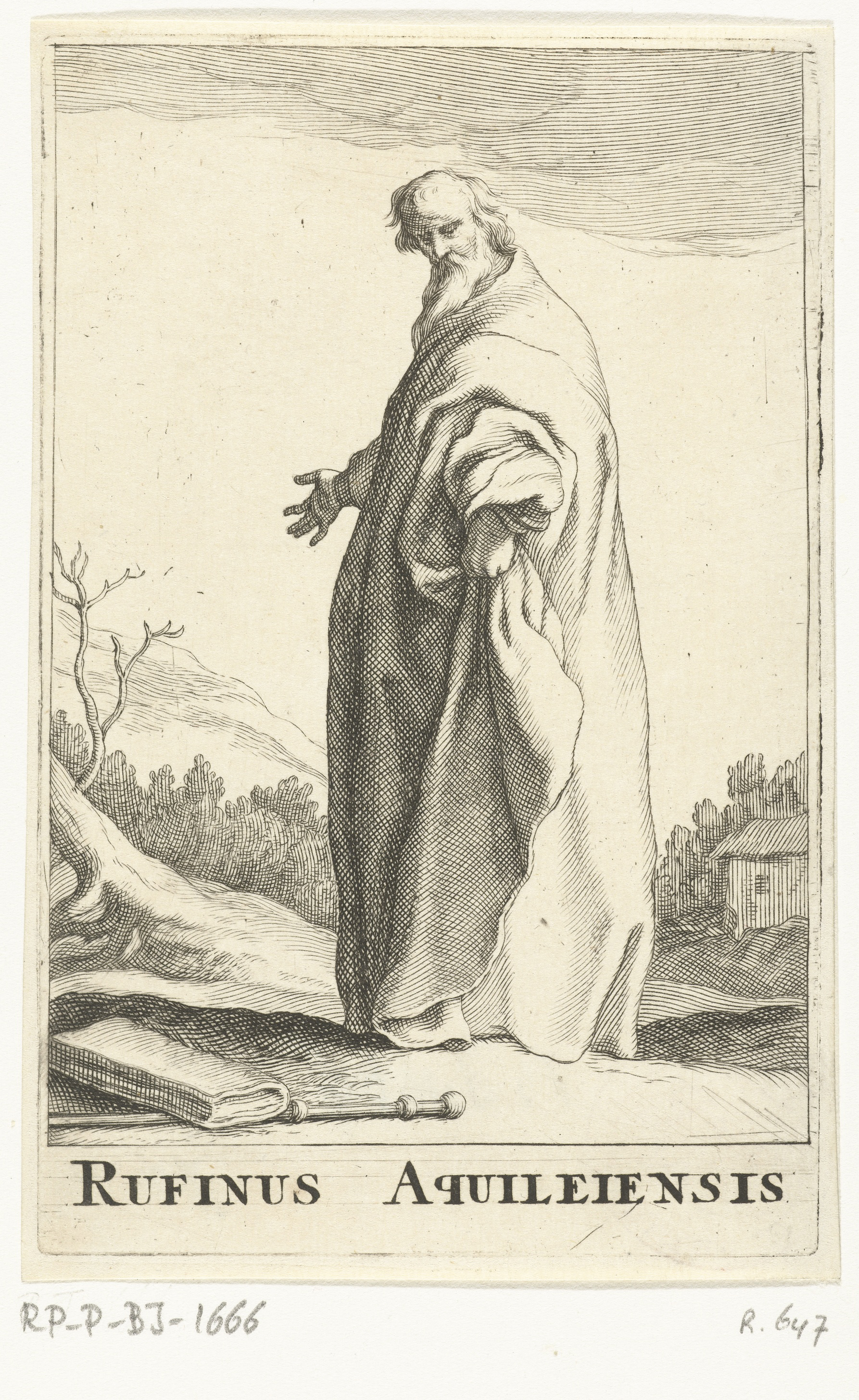
Rufinus Aquileiensis

Tyrannius Rufinus, also called Rufinus of Aquileia (Latin: Rufinus Aquileiensis; 344–412), was an early Christian monk, philosopher, historian, and theologian who worked to translate Greek patristic material, especially the work of Origen, into Latin.

== Life ==
Rufinus was born in 344 in the Roman city of Julia Concordia (now Concordia Sagittaria), near Aquileia (in modern-day Italy) at the head of the Adriatic Sea. It appears that both of his parents were Christians.

Around 370, he was living in a monastic community in Aquileia when he met Jerome. In about 372, Rufinus followed Jerome to the eastern Mediterranean, where he studied in Alexandria under Didymus the Blind for some time, and became friends with Macarius the elder and other ascetics in the desert. In Egypt, if not even before leaving Italy, he had become intimately acquainted with Melania the Elder, a wealthy and devout Roman widow. When she moved to Palestine, taking with her a number of clergy and monks on whom the persecutions of the Arian Valens had borne heavily, Rufinus followed her, moving to Jerusalem in 380. There, while his patroness lived in a convent of her own in Jerusalem, Rufinus, at her expense, gathered together a number of monks to form a new monastery on the Mount of Olives, devoting himself to the study of Greek theology. This combination of the contemplative life and the life of learning had already developed in the Egyptian monasteries. When Jerome came to Bethlehem in 386, the friendship formed at Aquileia was renewed. Jerome, along with his patroness Paula, set up a similar community in Bethlehem a few years later. Another of the intimates of Rufinus was John II, Bishop of Jerusalem, and formerly a monk of the Natrun desert, by whom he was ordained to the priesthood in 390.

In 394, as a result of the attacks by Epiphanius of Salamis upon the doctrines of Origen made during a visit to Jerusalem, a fierce quarrel broke out, which found Rufinus and Jerome on different sides. Although both Jerome and Rufinus had previously been great admirers of Origen's work, in the light of Epiphanius' criticism of Origen, Jerome felt that Rufinus was not fierce enough in attacking the works of Origen. Three years afterwards a formal reconciliation was brought about between Jerome and Bishop John, with whom Rufinus sided, but this was to prove only temporary.

In the autumn of 397 Rufinus embarked for Rome, where, finding that the theological controversies of the East were exciting much interest and curiosity, he published a Latin translation of the Apology of Pamphilus for Origen. In an appendix, he claimed that many of the controversial features in Origen's teaching arose from interpolations and falsifications of the genuine text. In his somewhat free translation of Origen's De Principiis (Περὶ Αρχῶν), published 398/399, Rufinus downplayed these controversial passages. In the preface to De Principiis, Rufinus referred to Jerome as an admirer of Origen, and as having already translated some of his works with modifications of ambiguous doctrinal expressions. This allusion annoyed Jerome, who was exceedingly sensitive as to his theological and scholarly reputation. The consequence was a bitter pamphlet war, with Rufinus's Against Jerome and Jerome's Against Rufinus.

At the instigation of Theophilus of Alexandria, Pope Anastasius I (399-401) summoned Rufinus from Aquileia to Rome to vindicate his orthodoxy, but he excused himself from a personal attendance in a written Apologia pro fide sua. The pope in his reply expressly condemned Origen, but left the question of Rufinus's orthodoxy to his own conscience. He was, however, regarded with suspicion in orthodox circles (cf. the Decretum Gelasii, 20).

Rufinus spent most of the first decade of the fifth century translating Origen. He translated Origen's homilies for the whole Heptateuch except Deuteronomy, and others on selected Psalms, the Song of Songs, and 1 Samuel. Rufinus's translation of Origen's Commentary on Romans (c. 405-6) gave fresh stimulus to discussions of destiny and free will that had been going on in Roman circles since the mid-390s and would shortly become an issue in Augustine's clash with Pelagius.

Rufinus also translated other works. These include Eusebius' Ecclesiastical History, translated in 401 at the request of Bishop Chromatius of Aquileia as an antidote to the terror caused by the Gothic incursions into Italy. Rufinus omits much of Eusebius' tenth book, and compresses what remains of it into book 9; he also retouches the narrative in several places and adds two books of his own to bring the account down to the death of Theodosius the Great (395).

Such translations often appear to have been done as a result of a commission or with a local readership in mind, and so it seems likely that Rufinus worked with the support of friends and patrons. Between 397 and 408 he lived in Italy, probably mainly in Rome and Aquileia; in 408 Rufinus was at the monastery of Pinetum (in the Campagna?), having been driven there by the arrival of Alaric in northern Italy. He fled to Sicily when Alaric moved south and pillaged Rome in 410. He was in the company of Melania the Younger in his flight. He died in Sicily in 411.

== Works ==
=== Original works ===
- Commentarius in symbolum apostolorum: a commentary on the Apostles' Creed which gives evidence of its use and interpretation in 4th-century Italy. (Commentary on the Apostles' Creed, at New Advent)
- The Church History of Rufinus of Aquileia.

Many of his extant works are defences of himself against attacks by Jerome.

- De Adulteratione Librorum Origenis – an appendix to his translation of the Apology of Pamphilus, and intended to show that many of the features in Origen's teaching which were then held to be objectionable arise from interpolations and falsifications of the genuine text
- De Benedictionibus XII Patriarcharum Libri II – an exposition of Gen. xlix.
- Apologia s. Invectivarum in Hieronymum Libri II
- Apologia pro Fide Sua ad Anastasium Pontificem (Apology, Sent to Anastasius, Bishop of the City of Rome, at New Advent)
- Historia Eremitica – consisting of the lives of thirty-three monks of the Nitrian desert

The anti-Origenist Liber de fide was in the past sometimes attributed to Rufinus of Aquileia, but now it is more often assigned to Rufinus the Syrian.

=== Translations from Greek to Latin ===
Rufinus translated the Historia Ecclesiastica of Eusebius of Caesarea and continued the work from the reign of Constantine I to the death of Theodosius I (395). It was published in 402 or 403.

Origen's commentary on the New Testament Epistle to the Romans, along with many of his sermons on the Old Testament, survive only in versions by Rufinus. The full text of Origen's De principiis (On first principals) also survives only in Rufinus's translation. Jerome, earlier a friend of Rufinus, fell out with him and wrote at least three works opposing his opinions and condemning his translations as flawed. For instance, Jerome prepared a (now lost) translation of Origen's De principiis to replace Rufinus's translation, which Jerome said was inadequate.

Other translations by Rufinus include:

1. the Instituta Monachorum and some of the Homilies of Basil of Caesarea
2. the Apology of Pamphilus, referred to above
3. Origen's Homilies (Gen. Lev. Num. Josh. Kings, also Cant, and Rom.)
4. De recta in Deum fide by Pseudo-Origen (Adamantius)
5. Opuscula of Gregory of Nazianzus
6. the Sententiae of Sixtus, an unknown Greek philosopher
7. the Sententiae of Evagrius
8. the Clementine Recognitions (the only form in which that work is now extant)
9. the Canon Paschalis of Anatolius Alexandrinus.
10. Josephus' Antiquities and The Jewish War (Josephus de antiquitatibus ac de bello judaico.)

=== Quotes from Rufinus ===
He said;

"[The Incarnation] was that the divine nature of the Son of God might be like a kind of hook hidden beneath the form of human flesh… to lure on the prince of this world to a contest; that the Son might offer him his human flesh as a bait and that the divinity which lay underneath might catch him and hold him fast with its hook… then, just as a fish when it seizes a baited hook not only fails to drag off the bait but is itself dragged out of the water to serve as food for others; so he that had the power of death sees the body of Jesus in death, unaware of the hook of divinity which lay hidden inside. Having swallowed it, he was immediately caught. The gates of hell were broken, and he was, as it were, drawn up from the pit, to become food for others." — Christian Theology, an Introduction, Chapter 13, The Doctrine of Salvation in Christ.

== Influence ==
Rufinus exerted considerable influence on Western theologians by thus putting the great Greek fathers into the Latin tongue. Dominic Vallarsi's uncompleted edition of Rufinus (vol. i. folio. Verona, 1745) contains the De Benedictionibus, the Apologies, the Expositio Symboli, the Historia Eremitica and the two original books of the Historia Ecclesiastica. Vallarsi intended to collect the translations in vol. ii., but it was never published. See also Migne, Patrologia Latina (vol. xxi). For the translations, see the various editions of Origen, Eusebius, etc.
