= Cesare Sportelli =

Italian lawyer

Cesare Sportelli (29 March 1702 – 19 April 1750) was an Italian Roman Catholic Redemptorist lawyer.

== Biography ==
He was born at Mola di Bari in southern Italy and became a lawyer. He was 33 when under the guidance of Thomas Falcoia of the "Pii Operarii" he joined Saint Alphonsus Liguori, and was the first clerical novice of the saint's institute. He was ordained priest by his director, now become Bishop of Castellamare.

Sportelli was St. Alphonsus's first and most faithful companion. He founded the house of Mater Domini ('Mother of the Lord') at Caposele and the house of Pagani in which St. Alphonsus lived and died and where his relics repose. On his way to preach a retreat he was struck by apoplexy in a lonely place. Bandits helped him to reach Pagani, where after he died in 1750, the day he had foretold.

== Beatification process ==
Three years and seven months after his interment it was decided to transfer his remains to a place in a newly built crypt. When his coffin was opened the vestments turned to dust, while the body was in perfect preservation. The countenance was beautiful and when a vein was opened blood flowed.

Alphonsus wished to take steps at once for Sportelli's beatification, but was prevented from doing so by many difficulties. On 4 December 1899, the cause was introduced, thus giving Sportelli the title Servant of God.
