= Francesco Serao =

Italian physician, physicist and geologist

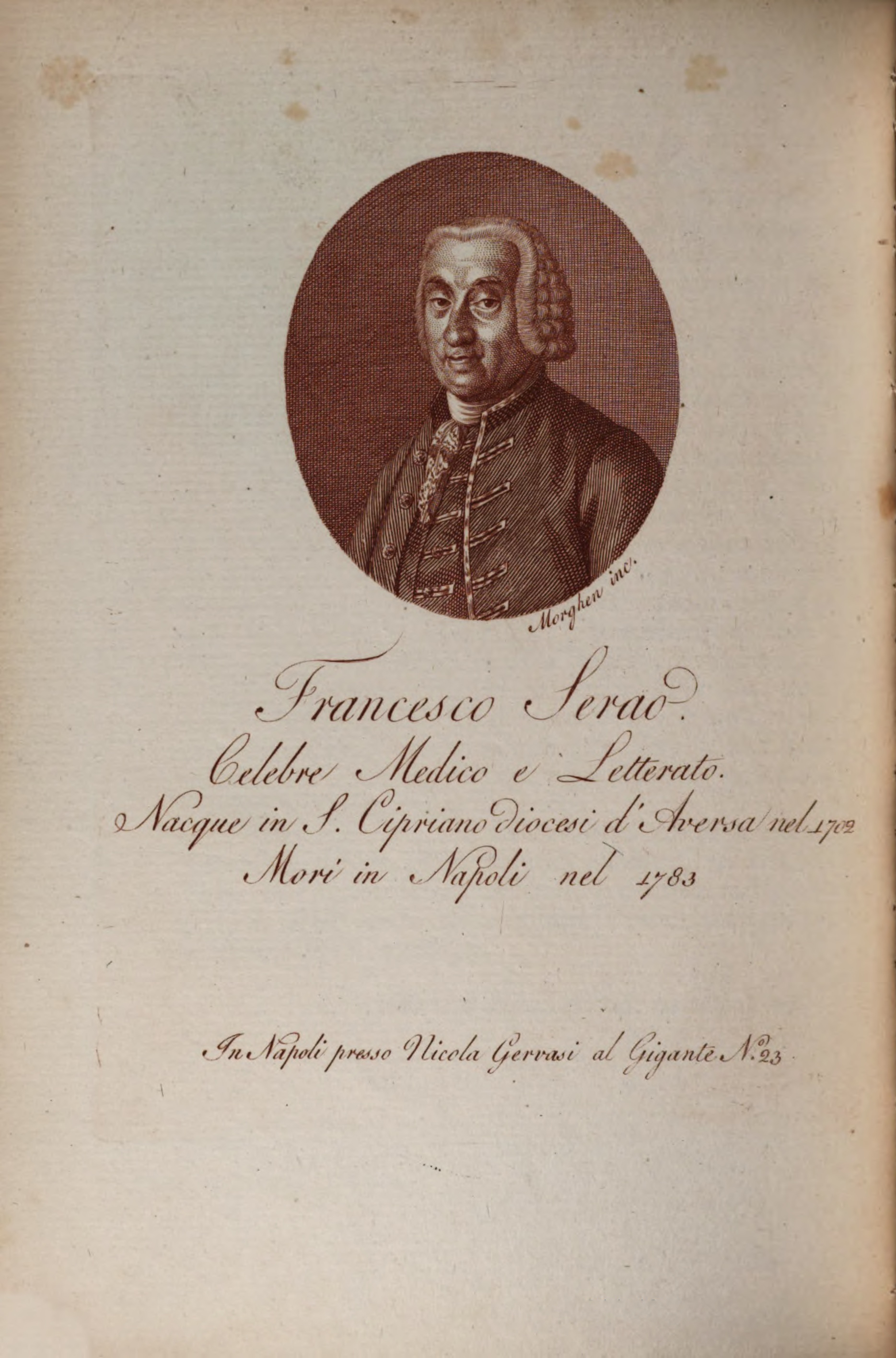
Francesco Serao

Francesco Serao (20 September 1702 – 5 August 1783) was an Italian physician, physicist, geologist, philosopher and scholar. He was born in San Cipriano d'Aversa and died in Naples, Italy.

== Biography ==
Serao was taught by the Jesuits in Naples. He followed the thinking of Descartes. At eighteen, he graduated in medicine and in 1727 he was awarded the chair of theoretical medicine. In 1732 he was professor of anatomy, then of medicine.

He was a member of the Royal Academy or Academy of Sciences of Naples with his teacher Niccolò Cirillo and was a member of the Academy of Sciences of Paris, of the London Academy, of the Benedictine University of Bologna and of other important scientific and literary groups in Europe.

He translated John Pringle's medical works into Italian. Serao was chief physician of the Kingdom of Naples and physician to King Ferdinand IV of Bourbon. Serao died in 1783 and was buried in the church of Monteverginella in Naples.

== Works ==
- Vita Nicolai Cirilli, 1738
- De suffocatis ad vitam revocandis, 1775
- Consilia medica
- Epistula ad Ioannonem Brunum sulla peste
- De Castrensibus morbis
- Istoria dell'incendio del Vesuvio accaduto nel mese di maggio 1737, Naples, published by Novello de Bonis, also translated into French and English in 1738
- Lezioni accademiche sulla tarantola, 1742
- Saggio di considerazioni anatomiche fatte su di un leone; Descrizione dell'elefante, Osservazioni sopra un fenomeno occorso nell'aprire un cinghiale, Naples, published by Giuseppe De Bonis

== See also ==
- University of Naples Federico II
