= Solomon Lombard =

Colonial Massachusetts pastor and politician

The Reverend Honorable Solomon Lombard (1702–1781) was elected to the Massachusetts General Court in 1765. Lombard, Esq. was an agent to the Boston Convention in 1768, a representative to the Massachusetts Provincial Congress in 1774, a representative to the Great and General Court at Salem, Massachusetts, in 1774, and a judge of the Massachusetts Court of Common Pleas from 1776 to 1781.

The oldest son, Solomon Lombard, was born Solomon Lumbart on April 5, 1702, in Truro, Barnstable County, Massachusetts, the son of Jedediah and Hannah (Lewis) Lumbart/Lumbert. A 1723 Harvard University graduate, he was married to Sarah Purington by Rev. John Avery of the Truro Congregation Church on June 3, 1725. They had 13 children born at Truro before relocating to Gorham, Maine c.1751. He was called to preach at Gorham by the town proprietors the previous year, when he was the first settled clergyman in Gorham. A part of the block house was fitted for public worship, where he ministered for about a dozen years. He had several children. His sons, Solomon and Richard, had large families.

A Gorham town meeting was held March 12, 1765. Officers elected included Surveyors of Lumber, and Lot layers. They voted Solomon Lombard, Esq. to serve for, and represent, Gorham at the Massachusetts Great Court, convened in Boston July 17, 1766.

As early as September 1768, a Gorham town meeting was held, and Solomon Lombard, Esq. (the former pastor) was chosen as "an agent to go to Boston, as soon as may be, to join a convention of agents from other towns in the province, to consult and resolve upon such measures as may most conduce to the safety and welfare of the inhabitants of this province at this alarming and critical juncture." Mr. Lombard was allowed eight days for going to, and returning from Boston. They kept up an able, active, and vigorous Committee of Correspondence, composed of men of wisdom, sagacity, and firmness."

Instructions to Solomon Lombard Esq. included: "Whereas you are chosen by the Town of Gorham to represent at a Great and General Court, or Assembly to be held at Salem, on Wednesday, the fifth day of October next. We desire you to observe the following instructions: that you use your endeavors to obtain a vote of the House, for the re-establishment of the former Charter of this Province. We instruct you to join with other members, which compose said Court, in forming themselves into a Provincial Congress in order to secure them in the enjoyment of their Charter, and Constitutional Rights of Freemen, and as Christians.

He was a Gorham Town Selectman in 1772. Also the town's first representative to the Massachusetts General Court. Reelected four times.

Lombard attended the Provincial Congress in 1774, was chairman of the committee of safety, and was active in the cause of the colonies in the War of the Revolution. He was among the most earnest in resisting the policy and acts of Parliament toward the colonies.

While the town of Gorham was a part of Massachusetts, it had four judges of the Court of Common Pleas (1776–1781). Solomon Lombard was chosen to be one of these in 1776.

Lombard died in 1781, aged 79 years.
