= Joseph Bonnier de la Mosson =

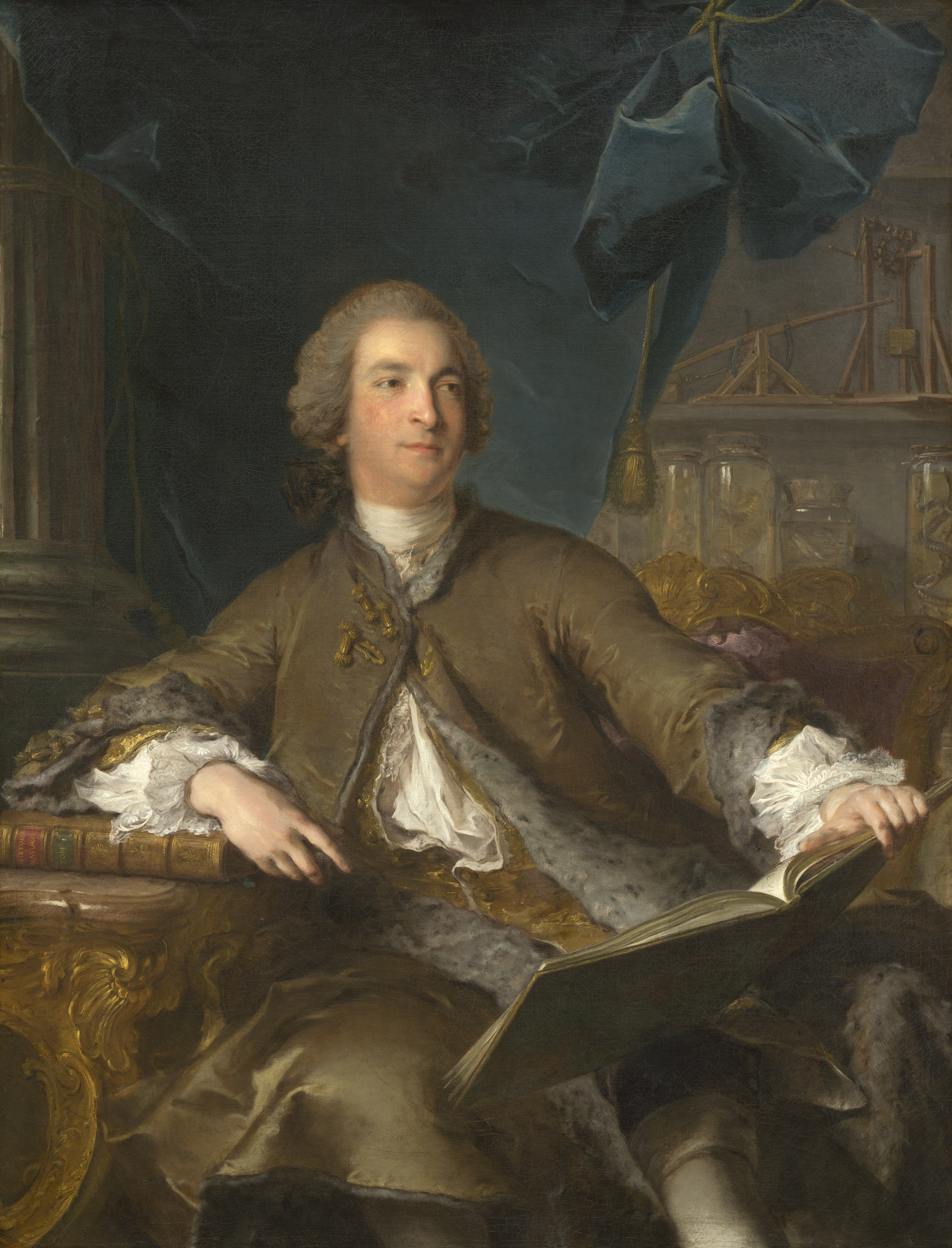
Portrait painting by Jean-Marc Nattier

Joseph Bonnier (6 September 1702, Montpellier, Languedoc – 26 July 1744) was a French aristocrat, whose fortune allowed him to have an army career, notably as colonel of the régiment des Dragons-Dauphin and maréchal des logis de la Maison royale. On his father's death he left Paris to take over his job as treasurer of Languedoc. Made baron of la Mosson, he built a folly, the château de la Mosson near Montpellier.

From 1732 to 1739, he was in a relationship with comedian and opera singer Mademoiselle Petitpas. A great lover of the arts and sciences, he became famous for the collection he built up in his Parisian hôtel. On his death his fortune was squandered and the château sacked.
