= Sanabor =

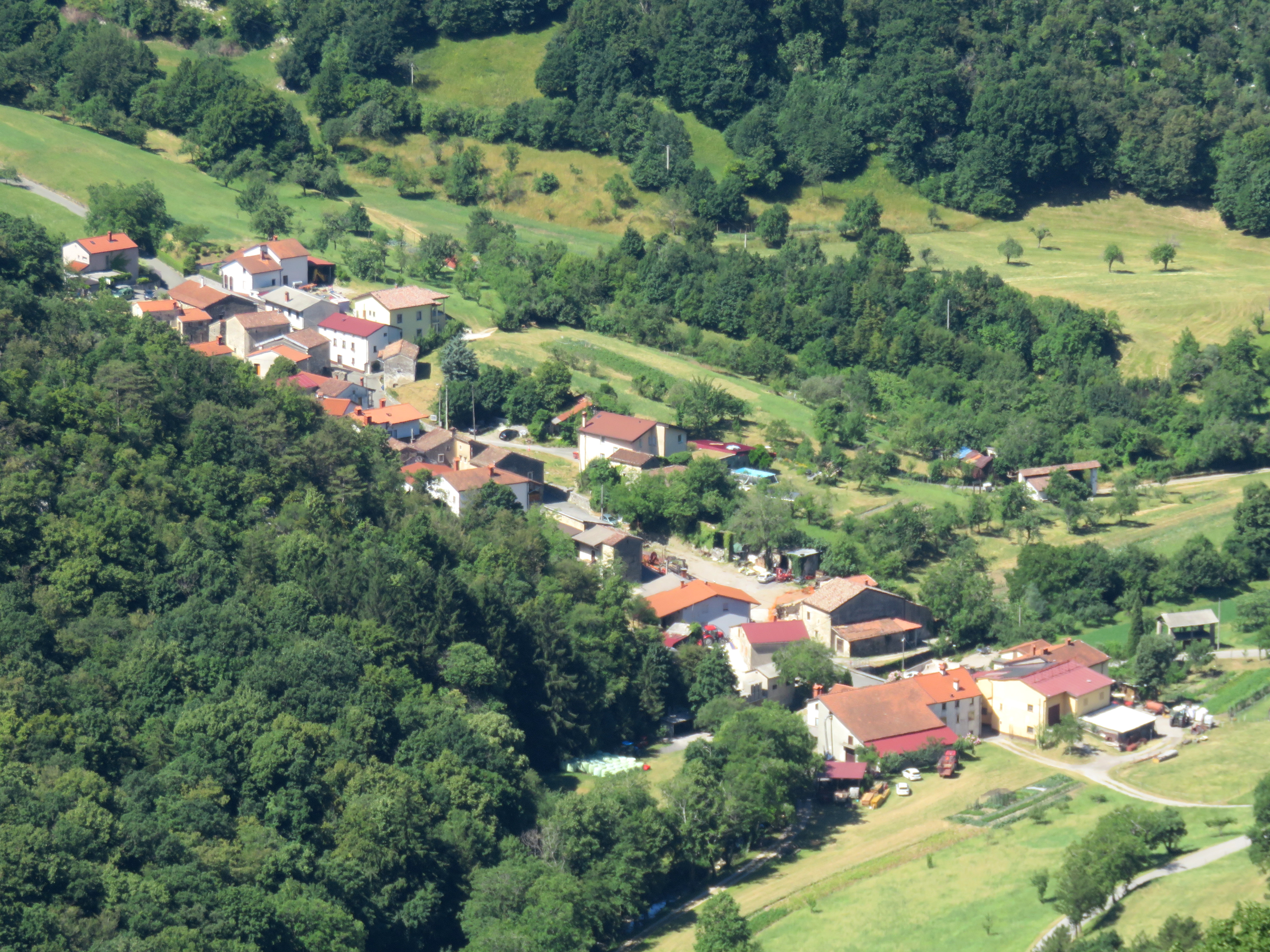

- Location in Slovenia
- Coordinates: 45°52′32.76″N 13°59′15.34″E
- Country: Slovenia
- Traditional region: Littoral
- Statistical region: Gorizia
- Municipality: Vipava

Area
  - Total: 5.97 km^{2} (2.31 sq mi)
- Elevation: 332.8 m (1,092 ft)

Population (2002)
  - Total: 80

Sanabor (pronounced [ˈsaːnabɔɾ]) is a village in the hills northeast of Vipava in the Littoral region of Slovenia.

== Church ==
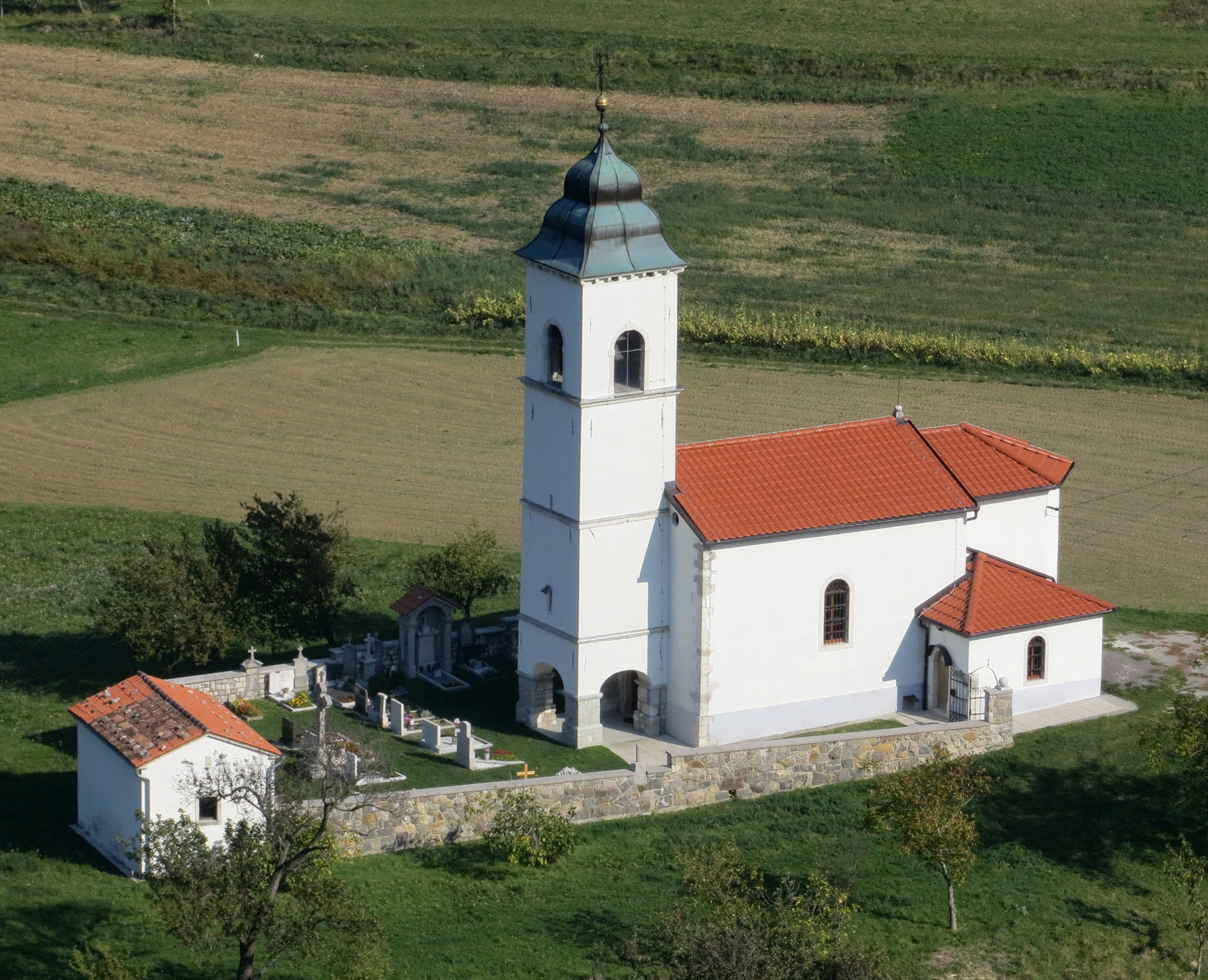
Prophet Daniel Church

The local church is dedicated to the Prophet Daniel and belongs to the Parish of Col.
