= Franz Anton Maichelbeck =

German organist and composer

Franz Anton Maichelbeck (6 July 1702 – 14 June 1750) was a German organist and composer.

== Life ==
Born in Reichenau Island, Maichelbeck grew up there with twelve siblings and attended the Heinrich-Suso-Gymnasium Konstanz. He studied theology in Freiburg from 1721 and was sent to Rome on 27 September 1725 to study church music. In 1727/1728 he was appointed organist and cathedral kapellmeister at the Freiburg Cathedral. Later he was appointed by prince bishop Johann Franz Schenk von Stauffenberg as HofKapellmeister in Augsburg.

Anton died in Freiburg im Breisgau at age 47.

== Publications and works ==
- 1734: Messe zu Ehren der Hl. Scholastika (Missa Sanctissimae Matris Scholasticae)
- 1738: Die auf dem Clavier lehrende Caecilia, welche guten Unterricht ertheilet
- 1740: Requiem für Kaiser Karl VI.
