= The Daily Courant =

First British daily newspaper

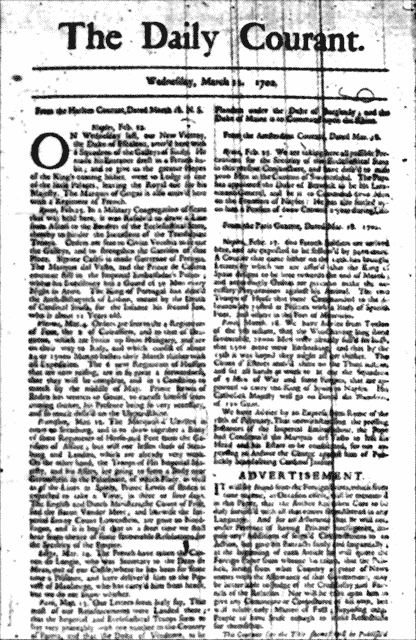
- Front page of the first issue
- Type: Daily newspaper
- Format: Leaflet
- Owner: Samuel Buckley
- Founder: Elizabeth Mallet
- Founded: 11 March 1702 (323 years ago)
- Ceased publication: 28 June 1735 (290 years ago)
- Political alignment: Neutral, without opinions
- Language: English
- Headquarters: № 62–65 Ludgate Hill (London)
- Country: Great Britain
- Readership: The middle class and above, who could afford to buy a newspaper every day.
- OCLC number: 4203980
- Free online archives: https://archive.org/details/sim_daily-courant_1702-03-11_1

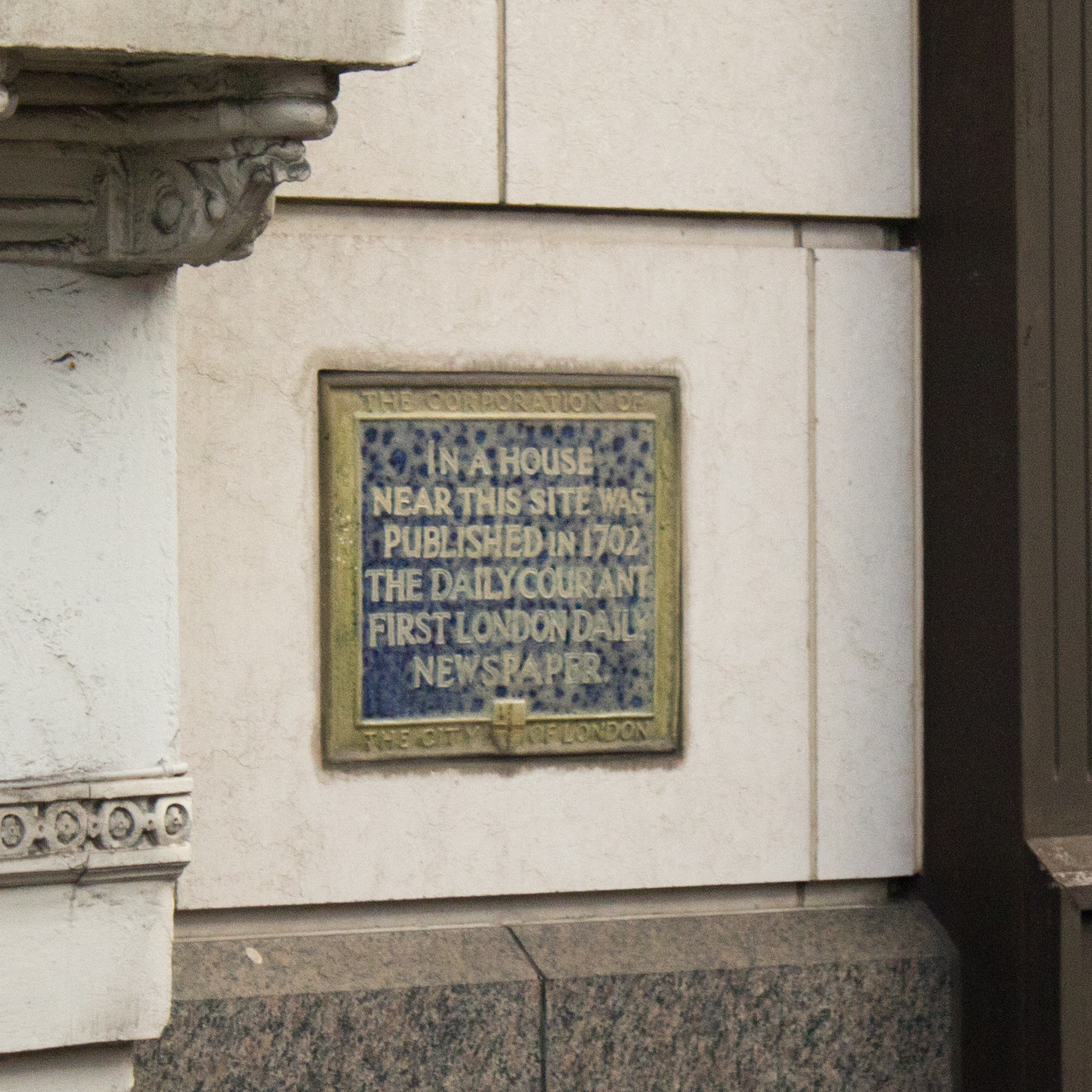
A marker in London, close to where The Daily Courant was first published

The Daily Courant, initially published on [O.S. 11 March] 1702, was the first British daily newspaper. It was produced by Elizabeth Mallet at her premises next to the King's Arms tavern at Fleet Bridge in London. The newspaper consisted of a single page, with advertisements on the reverse side. Mallet advertised that she intended to publish only foreign news and would not add any comments of her own, supposing her readers to have "sense enough to make reflections for themselves".

After only forty days Mallet sold The Daily Courant to Samuel Buckley, who moved it to premises in the area of Little Britain in London, at "the sign of the Dolphin". Buckley later became the publisher of The Spectator. The Daily Courant lasted until 1735, when it was merged with the Daily Gazetteer.
