= John Evans (1702–1782) =

Welsh anti-Methodist Anglican priest

John Evans (2 September 1702 – March 1782) was a Welsh Anglican cleric, known for his attacks upon Methodism.

== Life ==
Evans was born in Meidrym, Carmarthenshire, south Wales on 2 September 1702. He studied at the grammar school in Carmarthen and at the University of Oxford, matriculating from Jesus College in 1722. He was ordained and appointed to the parish of Eglwys Cymyn, Carmarthenshire although he only visited the parish for a few weeks each year in the summer, and employed curates to minister in the parish whilst he lived in London. He was appointed Reading Chaplain of the Chapel Royal, Whitehall in 1742 and preached the St David's Day sermon to the Society of Ancient Britons in 1750; the sermon was later published. He was a founder member and council member of the Honourable Society of Cymmrodorion when it was established in 1751. He was buried at Eglwys Cymyn on 14 March 1782.

Evans was inspired by Bishop Edmund Gibson to attack Methodism, publishing a hostile pamphlet against Griffith Jones in 1749 and a further attack in Some Account of the Welch Charity Schools (etc) in 1752. The attacks did little to harm the position of Griffith Jones and more to hurt the reputation of Evans himself.
