= Dominic Vallarsi =

Italian priest

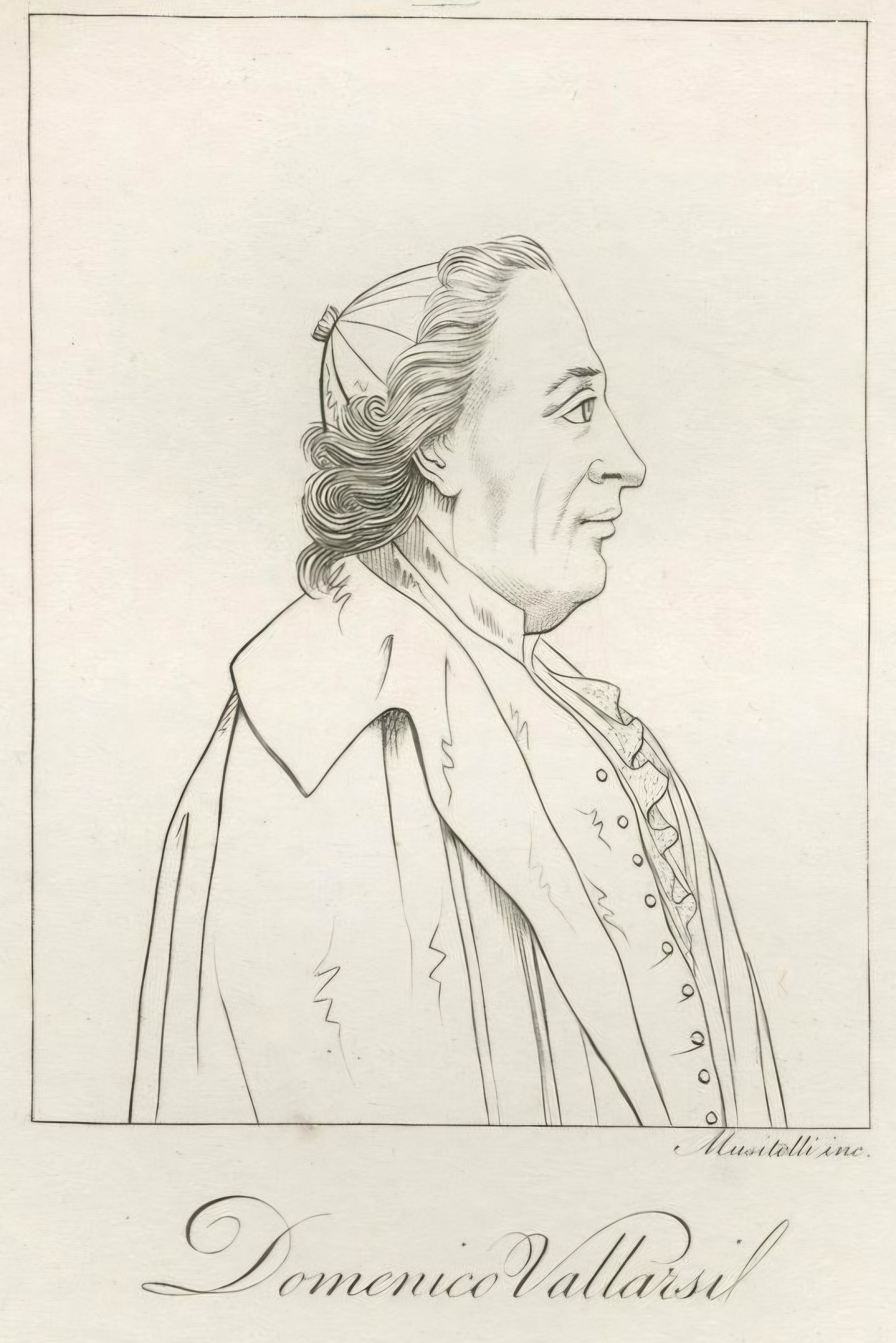
Engraved portrait of Domenico Vallarsi by Benedetto Musitelli

Dominic Vallarsi (13 November 1702 – 14 August 1771) was an Italian priest, born in Verona.

== Biography ==
Domenico Vallarsi was born in Verona on November 13, 1702. He studied with the Jesuits at Verona and after his elevation to the priesthood occupied himself chiefly in archæological and Patristic studies. In his searches for manuscripts and other antiquities he was aided financially by the City of Verona and its bishop, as well as by Benedict XIV, who gave him a benefice in the Diocese of Vicenza and appointed him reviser for the Semitic languages at the Holy Office. He was also highly respected for his archæological learning by such men as Muratori, Apostolo Zeno, Giammaria Mazzucchelli, and others.

== Literary works ==
- An edition of St. Jerome; "S. Hieronymi opera omnia post monachorum e congregatione S. Mauri recensionem quibusdam ineditis monumentis aliisque lucubrationibus aucta, notis et observationibus illustrata," (11 vols., Verona, 1734–42; revised and enlarged, Venice, 1766–72, reprinted in Patrologia Latina, XII-XXX).

The title refers to the Maurist edition by Jean Martianay and Antoine Pouget (Paris, 1693–1706).

Vallarsi also assisted Scipio Maffei in his revision of the Maurist edition of St. Hilary (Verona, 1730) and brought out an incomplete edition of the works of Rufinus (Verona, 1745). The second volume, which was to contain the Latin translations of Rufinus, did not appear.
