= Jvari inscriptions =

Inscriptions on the Jvari Monastery, near Mtskheta, Georgia

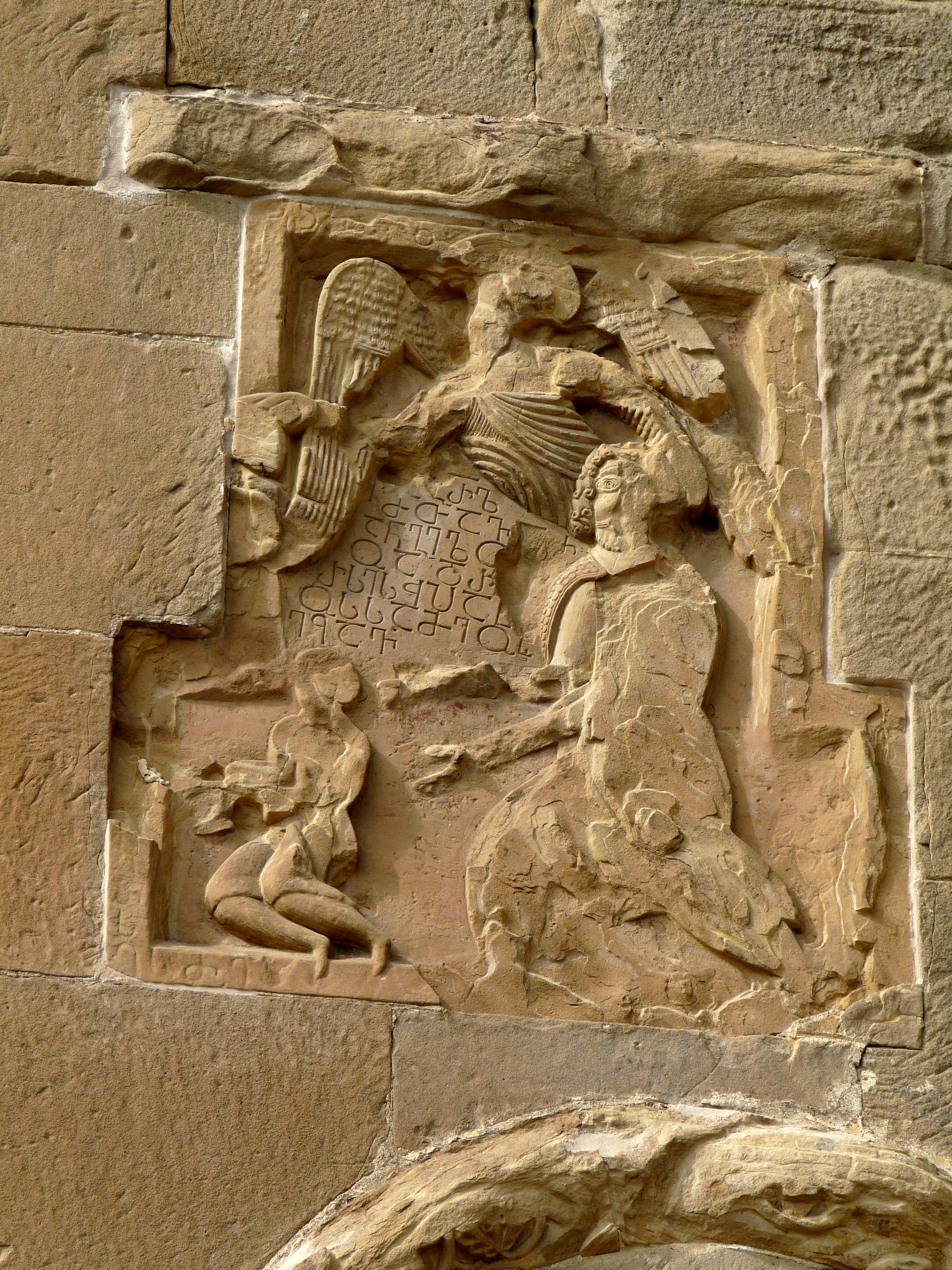
- Inscription 3
- Material: Relief
- Size: 87/101 x 138 cm (inscription 1); 87/122 x 138 cm (inscription 2); 86/170 x 122 cm (inscription 3); 70/80 x 130 cm (inscription 4)
- Writing: Georgian script
- Created: AD c. 595-605
- Present location: Jvari Monastery
- Language: Old Georgian

The Jvari inscriptions (Georgian: ჯვრის წარწერები, romanized: jvris ts'arts'erebi) are the Old Georgian inscriptions written in the Georgian Asomtavruli script on the Jvari Monastery, a basilica located near Mtskheta, Georgia. Per Professor Wachtang Djobadze, inscriptions mention Georgian princes Stephen I of Iberia, Demetrius the Hypatos and Adarnase I of Iberia. However, Professor Cyril Toumanoff disagrees with this view and identifies these individuals with Stephen II of Iberia, Demetrius and Adarnase II of Iberia, respectively. Inscriptions are dated to the late sixth-early seventh centuries.

== Inscriptions ==
=== Inscription 1 ===
Ⴍ ႫႠႺ
ႭႥႰႨႱႠ
Ⴍ ႱႲႤႴႠႬႭ
Ⴑ ႵႠႰႧႪႨႱ
Ⴀ ႮႠႲႰႨ
ႩႨႭႱႨ ႸႤ
Translation: "Cross of Our Savior, have mercy on Stephanoz, the patrikios of Kartli."

=== Inscription 2 ===
ႼႭ
ႫႵ Ⴊ Ⴋ
ႧႠႥႠႰႠႬႢႤႪႭႦႭ
ႣႤႫႤႲႰ
ႤႱ ჃႮႠ
ႲႭႱႱ
Ⴀ ႫႤႭ
Ⴞ ႾႤႷ
ႠႥ
Translation: "Holy Michael Archangel, have mercy on Demetre the hypatos."

=== Inscription 3 ===
ႼႭ ႢႰႪ
ႫႧႠႥ
ႠႬႢႤႪႭ
Ⴍ ႠႣႰ
ႰႱႤႱ ჃႮႠႲ
ႭႱႱႠ ႫႤႭႾ
ႤႷႠႥ
Translation: "Holy Grigol Archangel, have mercy on Adarnase the hypatos."

=== Inscription 4 ===
ႼႭ ႱႲႤ
ႵႭႡႳႪ
ႱႲႨ
ႸႤ
Translation: "Holy Stephen, have mercy on Kobul Stephanoz."

== See also ==
- Bir el Qutt inscriptions
- Bolnisi inscriptions

== Bibliography ==
- Epigraphic Corpus of Georgia (ECG) Project, Institute of Linguistic Studies, Ilia State University
- Rapp, Stephen H. (2014) The Sasanian World Through Georgian Eyes, Caucasia and the Iranian Commonwealth in Late Antique Georgian Literature, Routledge, ISBN 9781472425522
