= Sasanian coinage =

Coins of the Sasanian Empire

Sasanian coinage

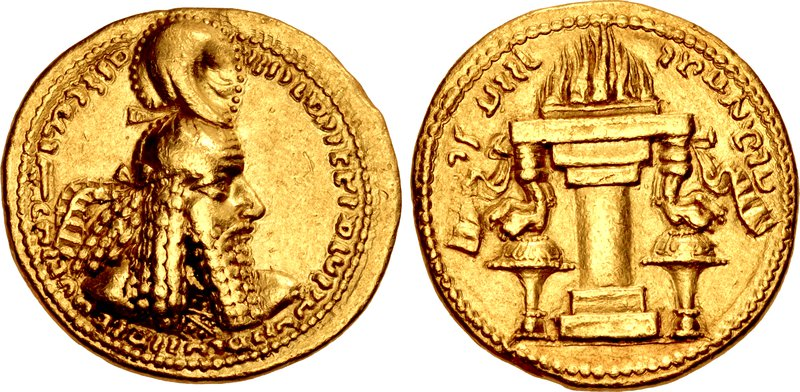
Gold double dēnār of Ardashir I (r. 224–242), struck at the Ctesiphon mint. Obv: crowned bust of Ardashir I wearing diadem and headdress with korymbos and Middle Persian (Inscriptional Pahlavi) text ↙ 𐭬𐭦𐭣𐭩𐭮𐭭 𐭡𐭢𐭩 𐭠𐭥𐭲𐭧𐭱𐭲𐭥 𐭬𐭥𐭪𐭠𐭭 𐭬𐭥𐭪𐭠 𐭠𐭩𐭥𐭠𐭭 𐭬𐭭𐭥 𐭰𐭲𐭥𐭩 𐭬𐭭 𐭩𐭦𐭣𐭠 mzdysn bgy ʼrtḥštr MRKʼn MRKʼ ʼyrʼn MNW ctry MN yzdʼ. Rev: ↙ 𐭭𐭥𐭥𐭠 𐭦𐭩 NWRʼ ZY in Middle Persian i.e. Pahlavi to the left of the fire altar, and ↖ 𐭠𐭥𐭲𐭧𐭱𐭲𐭥 ʼrtḥštr to the right of the fire altar

Sasanian coinage was produced within the domains of the Iranian Sasanian Empire (224–651). Together with the Roman Empire, the Sasanian Empire was the most important money-issuing polity in Late Antiquity. Sasanian coinage had a significant influence on coinage of other polities. Sasanian coins are a pivotal primary source for the study of the Sasanian period, and of major importance in history and art history in general. The Sylloge nummorum Sasanidarum is the most important primary work of reference for Sasanian coins.

== Context ==
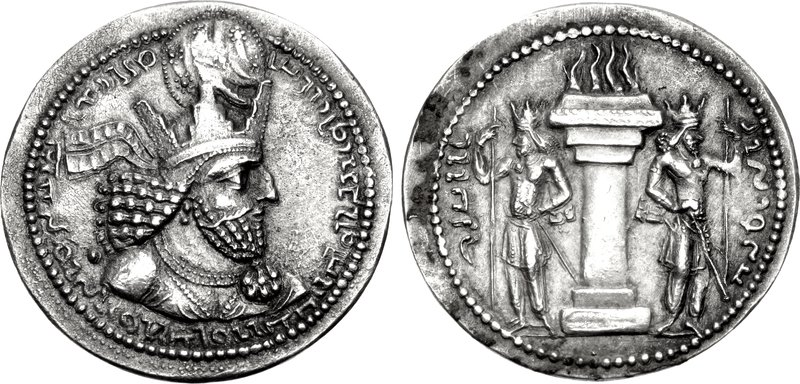
A standard Sasanian silver coin, a drachm of Shapur I with the crowned and richly adorned head of the king on the obverse, and the fire altar with its two attendants on the reverse. It was minted in Ctesiphon c.240-244. 28 mm, 4.35 gr.

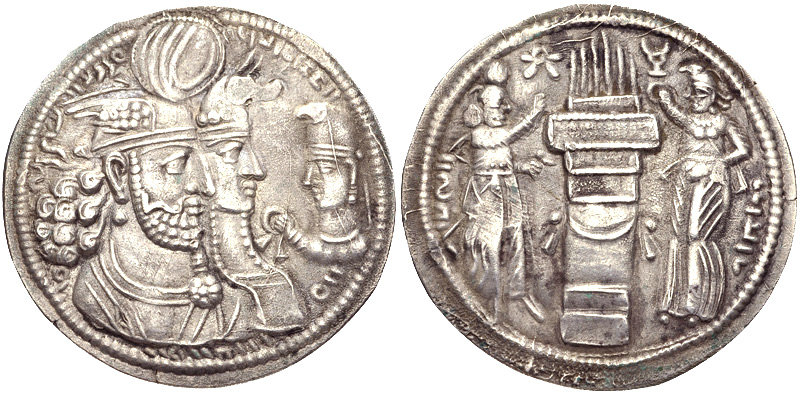
Silver drahm of Bahram II (r. 274–293). Obv: Crowned bust of Bahram II and his Queen Shapurdukhtak, facing right; a little figure, possibly their son (later known regnally as Bahram III), who wears a bonnet with an eagle's head, faces left, offering them a wreath. Rev: Fire altar with attendants; Faravahar to left of flames, taurus symbol to right

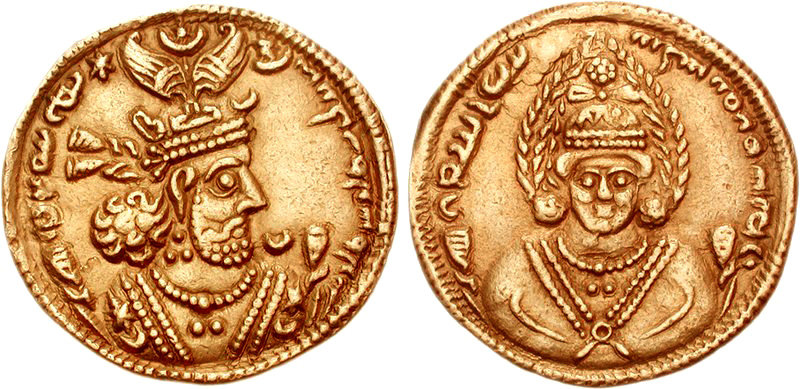
Gold dēnār of Khosrow II (r. 591–628), uncertain mint, dated 611. Obv: crowned bust of Khosrow II and Middle Persian (Pahlavi) text ⤹ GDH ʼpzwtʼ and ⤸ hwslwd mlkʼn mlkʼ. Rev: Facing bust of Anahit with flame nimbus and Middle Persian i.e. Pahlavi text ⤹ yʼcwysty (date) and ⤸ ʼylʼn ʼpzwt hwytkʼ

The main denomination of the Sasanians, introduced by King Ardashir I (r. 224–242) and inherited from the Parthians, was the silver drachm (𐭦𐭥𐭦𐭭 ZWZN drahm). It is a large thin coin (a novelty at the time) that weighs about 4 grams, with a diameter of 25–30 mm. It was made of rather pure silver and produced in large quantities by all Sasanian kings. Several Sasanian rulers also issued fractional silver (in much smaller numbers). Some of these fractional coins include the hemidrachm, the obol and the tetradrachm. Ardashir I had most likely inherited the hemidrachm and the obol from the monetary system of his home province, Persis (i.e. Pars). Coins of copper, brass, bronze, and (uncommonly) lead were produced under various reigns.

However, the tetradrachm already fell into disfavor in the early Sasanian period, during the reign of Bahram I (271-74), as it was mostly made out of copper with only a tiny bit of silver. Hemidrachms also only appeared at the beginning of the Sasanian period. Obols and hemiobols were used for a longer period, but they were only sporadically used for special occasions (e.g. investiture gifts, throwing in crowds). Production of the hemidrachms and tetradrachms eventually ceased under Bahram II (r. 274-93), but the Iranian variant of the obol, the dang (a Middle Persian word), was minted until the end of Kavad I's reign in the early 6th century.

Gold coins were produced in limited amounts and were mainly minted "for purposes of publicity and to compete with Roman and Kushan gold". Gold dinars (Middle Persian: dēnār, ultimately from Latin denarius aureus) were also introduced by Ardashir I, the first Sasanian ruler. Gold coinage was unknown to the Parthian monetary system, the predecessor of the Sasanian. Gold Sasanian coins weigh between 7 and 7.4 grams until Shapur III's reign (383–388). Minting of copper coins was very limited in the Sasanian Empire.

During over four hundred years of Sasanian history, minting coins was a sole privilege of the ruling royal, and the typology employed on Sasanian coinage was invariably the same in every part of the empire; this shows that Sasanian mints were under tight control of the royal central authorities. Other than being used for paying taxes, the precise context of Sasanian coinage as money within the empire remains unclear. However, it is known that a large part of Sasanian coinage was used to pay soldiers and troops. Therefore, according to Philippe Gignoux and Michael Bates, Shapur II (r. 309–379) and Peroz I (r. 459–484) "must have" increased coin production during their reigns, as they conducted numerous campaigns. Massive quantities were minted under Kavad I, Khosrow I (r. 531–579) and Khosrow II (r. 590–628), who were involved in high-profile wars. All Sasanian coins were hand struck, and, like in the Roman Empire, coin production was regulated according to "accurate and well-organized plans".

== Iconography and typology ==
Sasanian coins show a very consistent type of iconography, from the 3rd century to the 7th century, "though in point of style its portraits and reverses become progressively stylized". In the words of Rebecca Darley and Matthew Canepa:

Coins usually bore the royal portrait on the obverse and a fire altar with two attendants on the reverse, Sasanian coins contained multiple rims, and late Sasanian coins characteristically included astral symbols outside the rims. Legends were in Pahlavi. They include the name and titles of the King of Kings on the obverse and on the reverse the phrase ‘fire of (name of king)’ and, at times, a slogan. Minting location is occasionally indicated. Each king adopted a personal crown with divine and astral symbols. These were, by and large, unique to him. Exceptions are in cases of an initial co-regency (e.g. Ardashir I and Shapur I) and in the late Sasanian period when crowns become very stylized and often similar. If a king suffered a serious defeat, he might adopt a new crown (e.g. Narseh).

== Sasanian coinage of Sindh ==
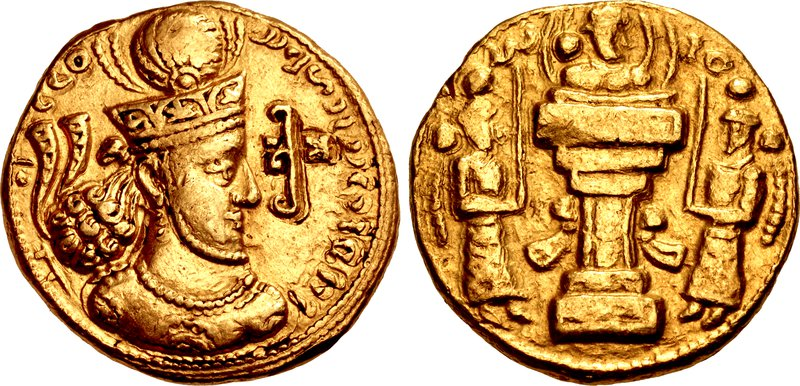
Gold coins of Sasanian Empire ruler Shapur III (r. 383-388), minted in Sindh, modern Pakistan. Obverse: Portrait of Shapur III, Brahmi script character Śrī ("Lord") in front of the King. Degraded Pahlavi legend around. Reverse: Fire altar with attendants.

The Sasanian coinage of Sindh refers to a series of Sasanian-style issues, minted from 325 to 480 CE minted in Sindh, in the southern part of modern Pakistan, with the coin type of successive Sasanian Empire rulers, from Shapur II to Peroz I. Together with the coinage of the Kushano-Sasanians, these coins are often described as "Indo-Sasanian". They form an important part of Sasanian coinage.

== Sasanian coinage of Iberia (Georgia) ==
Although various hoards have been found in what is present-day Georgia containing regular Sasanian coinage, no local mint mark has been identified thus far for these regular Sasanian coins. However, so-called Kartvelo-Sasanian coins were produced locally in Kartli during the later period of Sasanid suzerainty and rule over central-eastern Georgia (Iberia of the classical authors), that is, in the late 6th and first half of the 7th century. As all extant coins of this type are decorated on the obverse with an image of either Hormizd IV or Khosrow II, there are no Kartvelo-Sasanian coins that predate Hormizd IV's rule (which started in 579). The production of Kartvelo-Sasanian coins commenced after the suppression of the Iberian monarchy by the Sasanids, dated by Cyril Toumanoff to c. 580.

Kartvelo-Sasanian coins are usually decorated with asomtavruli letters and/or monograms. These monograms usually represented the names of the prominent and contemporaneous eristavis and presiding princes (eristavta-mtavaris) of Iberia. The earliest Kartvelo-Sasanian coins, as part of the first phase, were inscribed JO, which according to Stephen H. Rapp Jr translates as “O, Cross”. Once the Principality of Iberia was firmly established, the inscriptions, in this second phase, shifted to monograms which mentioned the name of the presiding princes. Examples amongst such are GN and GRG, i.e. "Gurgen/Guaram" respectively; both abbreviations are identified with prince Guaram I (r. 588-590). Presiding princes who followed after this phase were even bolder in the presentation of their religious affiliation. In this third and final phase of Kartvelo-Sasanian coins a small cross can be distinguished as a replacement for the sacred Zoroastrian flame atop the fire altar. This series commences with the abbreviation SPNS, i.e. "Stepanoz I", positioned around the image of the Sasanian Shahanshah Hormizd VI. The text does not obstruct the reading of the typically used Middle Persian legend. These adaptations develop further during Stepanoz I's reign (590–627), or perhaps during the reign of Stepanoz II (642–650). In this sub-phase, the full inscription of the name "Stepanoz" can be viewed on both sides of the head of the Sasanian Shahanshah, and the Middle Persian inscription depicting the name and regnal year of the Shahanshah is eliminated.

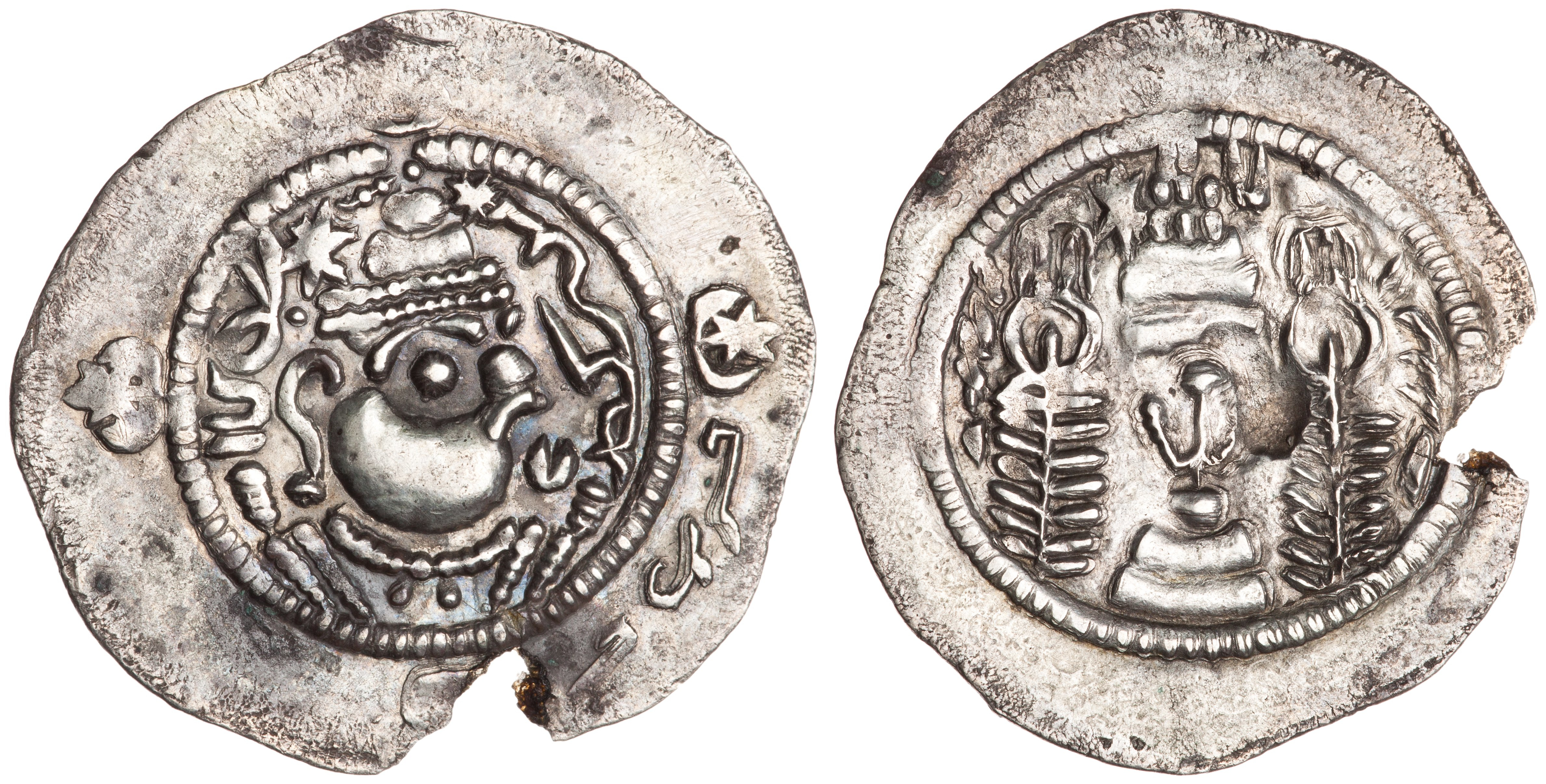
Sasanian type coin of prince Guaram I, with obverse bust of Hormizd IV and asomtavruli inscription GRG, i.e. Gurgen

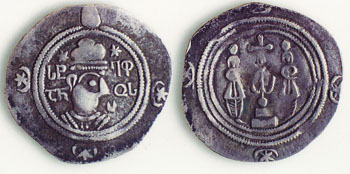
Sasanian type coin of prince Stephen I, with obverse bust of Khosrow II and asomtavruli inscription STEP'ANOS

== Influence on coinage of other polities ==
According to Darley and Canepa, Sasanian coinage was used extensively in trade, especially with Central Asia and China, and it formed a model for types struck in areas adjacent to the Sasanian Empire, including areas ruled by the Hepthalites and Kidarites. Following the Arab conquest of Iran, the Umayyad Caliphate copied Sasanian coinage but typically added some Arabic legends to the coins. However some coins of this period were struck without any Arabic text. These so-called Arab-Sasanian coins were minted in the heartlands of the former Sasanian Empire and followed Sasanian motives, including the depiction of the Zoroastrian fire altar. When during the reign of Abd al-Malik ibn Marwan (r. 685–705) a new "aniconic" Muslim coinage was created, the new Islamic silver dirham still "owed its distinctive silver fabric and wide flan to Sasanian minting techniques".

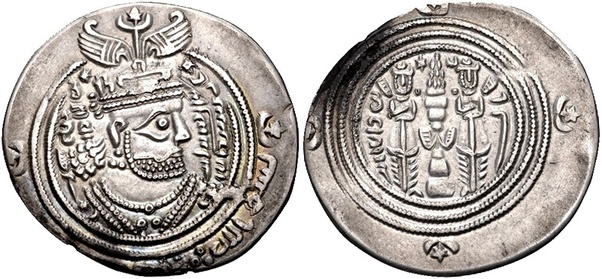
Sasanian type coin of the Umayyads, the bust imitating that of Khosrow II

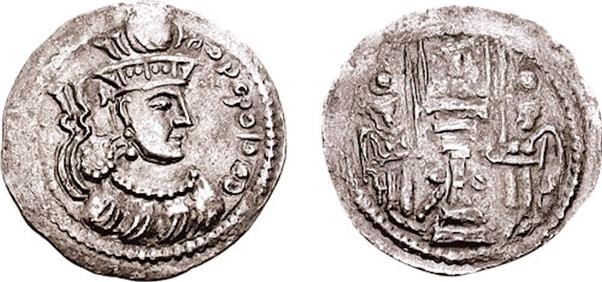
Sasanian type coin of the Kidarites, the bust imitating that of Shapur III

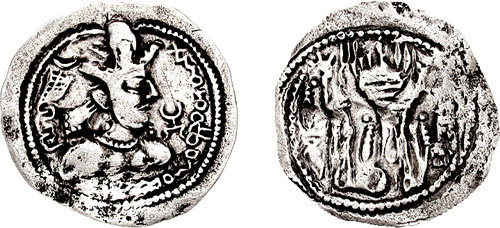
An early Alchon Huns coin based on a Sasanian design, with bust imitating Shapur II. Dated 400-440 CE.

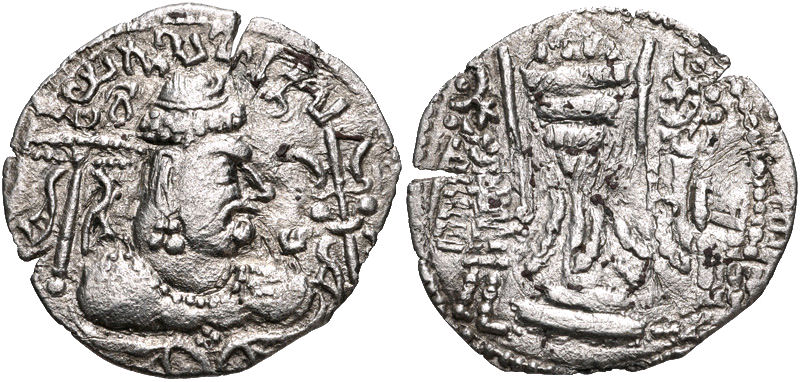
Coin of the Hunnic king Mihirakula with legend in the Indian Gupta script. Rev: Dotted border around Fire altar flanked by attendants in the Sasanian style.

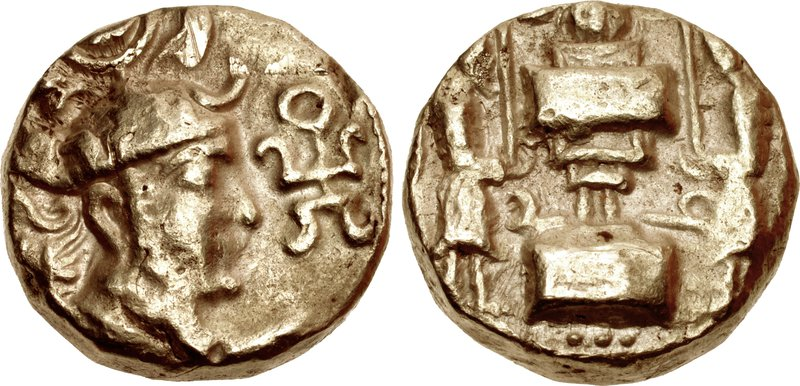
Uncertain Hunnic chieftain, a coin derived from the Sasanian coinage of Sindh. Sind, 5th century

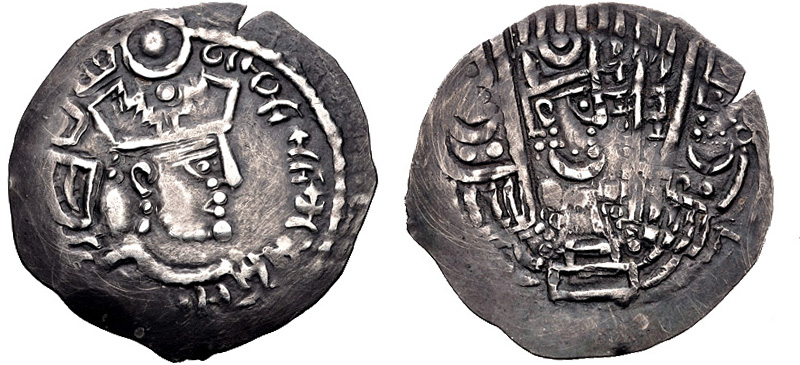
A silver drachm after Sasanian example of the Bukhar Khudahs, Sogdia, early 8th century. 30 mm, 3.08 gr. The reverse shows the head of the king on the altar, the attendants almost unrecognizable

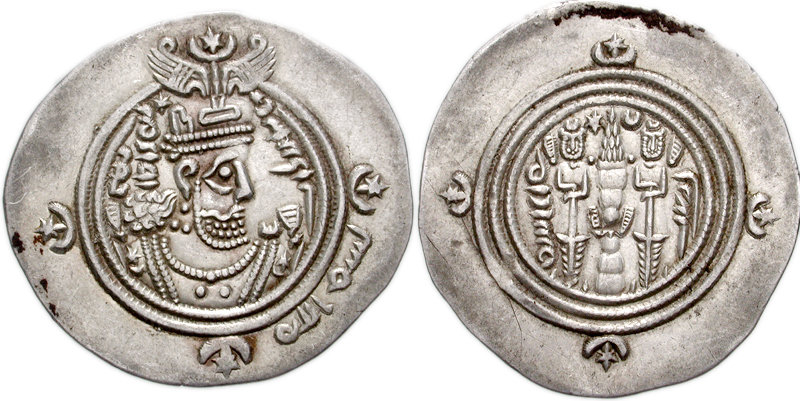
Coin of the Rashidun Caliphate. Imitation of Sasanid Empire ruler Khosrau II type. BYS (Bishapur) mint. Dated YE 25 = AH 36 (656 CE). Sasanian style bust imitating Khosrau II right; bismillah in margin.

A Late Arab-Sasanian coin struck in 75 AH (694–695 CE), retaining the bust of Khosrow II, but with Arabic legends completely replacing the Middle Persian legends and the figure of Abd al-Malik ibn Marwan replacing the fire altar.

=== Indo-Sasanian coinage (530 to 1202 CE) ===
There is also a whole category of Indian coins, in the "Indo-Sassanian style", that were derived from the Sasanian design in a rather geometric fashion, among the Gurjaras, Pratiharas, Chaulukya-Paramara and Palas from circa 530 CE to 1202 CE. Typically, the bust of the king on the obverse is highly simplified and geometric, and the design of the fire altar, with or without the two attendants, appears as a geometrical motif on the reverse of this type of coinage.

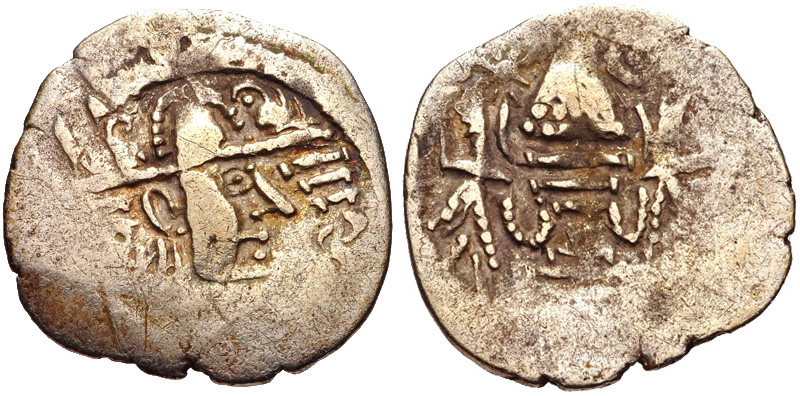
Coin of the Gurjara Confederacy, on the model of the Sasanian coinage of Sindh. Sindh. Circa 570-712 CE

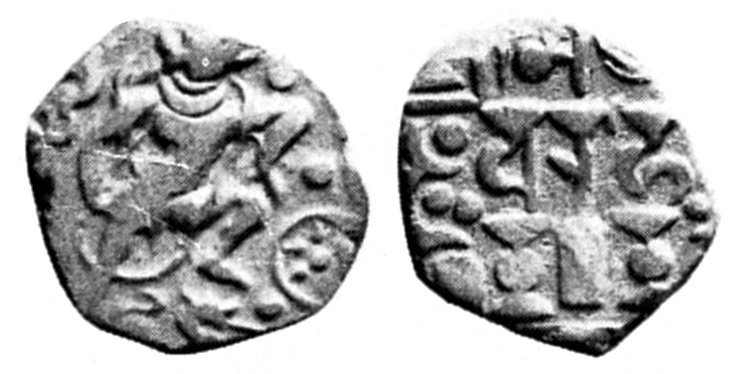
Gurjara-Pratihara coinage of Bhoja or Mihara, King of Kanauj, 850-900 CE. Obv: Boar, incarnation of Vishnu, and solar symbol. Rev: "Traces of Sasanian type". Legend: Srímad Ādi Varāha "The fortunate primaeval boar".

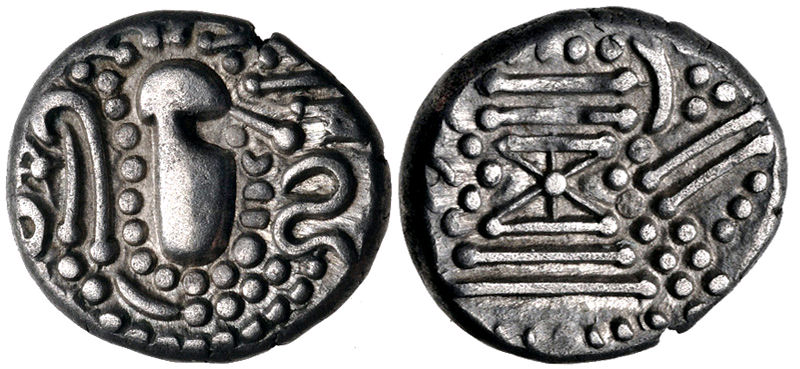
A Chaulukya-Paramara coin, circa 950-1050 CE. Stylized rendition of Chavda dynasty coins: Indo-Sassanian style bust right; pellets and ornaments around / Stylised fire altar; pellets around.

== See also ==
- Achaemenid coinage
- Parthian coinage
- Roman currency
- Byzantine coinage

== Sources ==
- Album, Stephen; Bates, Michael L.; Floor, Willem (1992). "COINS AND COINAGE". Encyclopaedia Iranica, Vol. VI, Fasc. 1. pp. 14–41.
- Bates, Michael (1986). "ARAB-SASANIAN COINS". Encyclopaedia Iranica, Vol. II, Fasc. 3. pp. 225–229.
- Darley, Rebecca; Canepa, Matthew (2018). "coinage, Persian". In Nicholson, Oliver (ed.). The Oxford Dictionary of Late Antiquity. Oxford: Oxford University Press. ISBN 978-0-19-866277-8.
- Darley, Rebecca (2018). "money". In Nicholson, Oliver (ed.). The Oxford Dictionary of Late Antiquity. Oxford: Oxford University Press. ISBN 978-0-19-866277-8.
- Gignoux, Philippe; Bates, Michael (1995b). "DINAR". Encyclopaedia Iranica, Vol. VII, Fasc. 4. pp. 412–416.
- Gignoux, Philippe; Bates, Michael (1995a). "DIRHAM". Encyclopaedia Iranica, Vol. VII, Fasc.4. pp. 424–428.
- Rapp, Stephen H. Jr (2014). The Sasanian World through Georgian Eyes: Caucasia and the Iranian Commonwealth in Late Antique Georgian Literature. Routledge. ISBN 978-1472425522.
- Schindel, Nikolaus (2005). "SASANIAN COINAGE". Encyclopaedia Iranica.
