= Adarnase II =

Ruler of Iberia
- Reign: 650 - 684/85
- Predecessor: Stephen II
- Successor: Guaram II
- Dynasty: Chosroid dynasty

Adarnase II (Georgian: ადარნასე II), of the Chosroid dynasty, was a presiding prince of Iberia (Kartli, eastern Georgia) from c. 650 to 684/5. He is presumably the Iberian patrikios mentioned in the 660s letter of Anastasius Apocrisiarius pertaining to the martyrdom of Maximus the Confessor, and the prince Nerses whose revolt against the Arabs is reported by the Armenian chronicler Hovannes Draskhanakertsi.

The name Adarnase derives from Middle Persian Ādurnarsēh, with the second component of the word (Nase) being the Georgian attestation of the Middle Persian name Narseh, which ultimately derives from Avestan nairyō.saŋya-. The Middle Persian name Narseh also exists in Georgian as Nerse. The name Ādurnarsēh appears in the Armenian language as Atrnerseh.

Adarnase succeeded his father Stephen II and ruled as a vassal of the Arab Caliphate (initially the Rashidun Caliphate, from 661 on, the Umayyad Caliphate. In 681/2, however, he joined the Armenian and Albanian princes in a general uprising against the Arab hegemony. He held off the Arab attacks for three years – until the Khazars entered the fight. Adarnase/Nerses was killed, and the Arabs installed Guaram II of the rival Guaramid Dynasty in Iberia.

The exterior stone plaque of the church of the Holy Cross at Mtskheta, Georgia, mentions the principal builders of this church along with their Byzantine titles: Stephanos the patrikios, Demetrius the hypatos, and Adarnase the hypatos who have traditionally been equated by the Georgian scholars with Stephen I, son of Guaram; Demetre, brother of Stephen I and Adarnase I. However, an opinion expressed by Professor Cyril Toumanoff disagrees with this view by identifying these individuals with Stephen II, Demetre (brother of Stephen I), and Adarnase II, respectively. He had a son, Stephen.

Preceded by Stephen II	Prince of Iberia c. 650–684/5	Succeeded by Guaram II
