= Jvari =

Jvari may refer to the following in the country of Georgia:

- Jvari (town), a town in Georgia
- Jvari (monastery), an ancient monastery in Georgia
- Jvari inscriptions, Georgian inscriptions
