= Demetrius the Hypatos =

Georgian nobleman

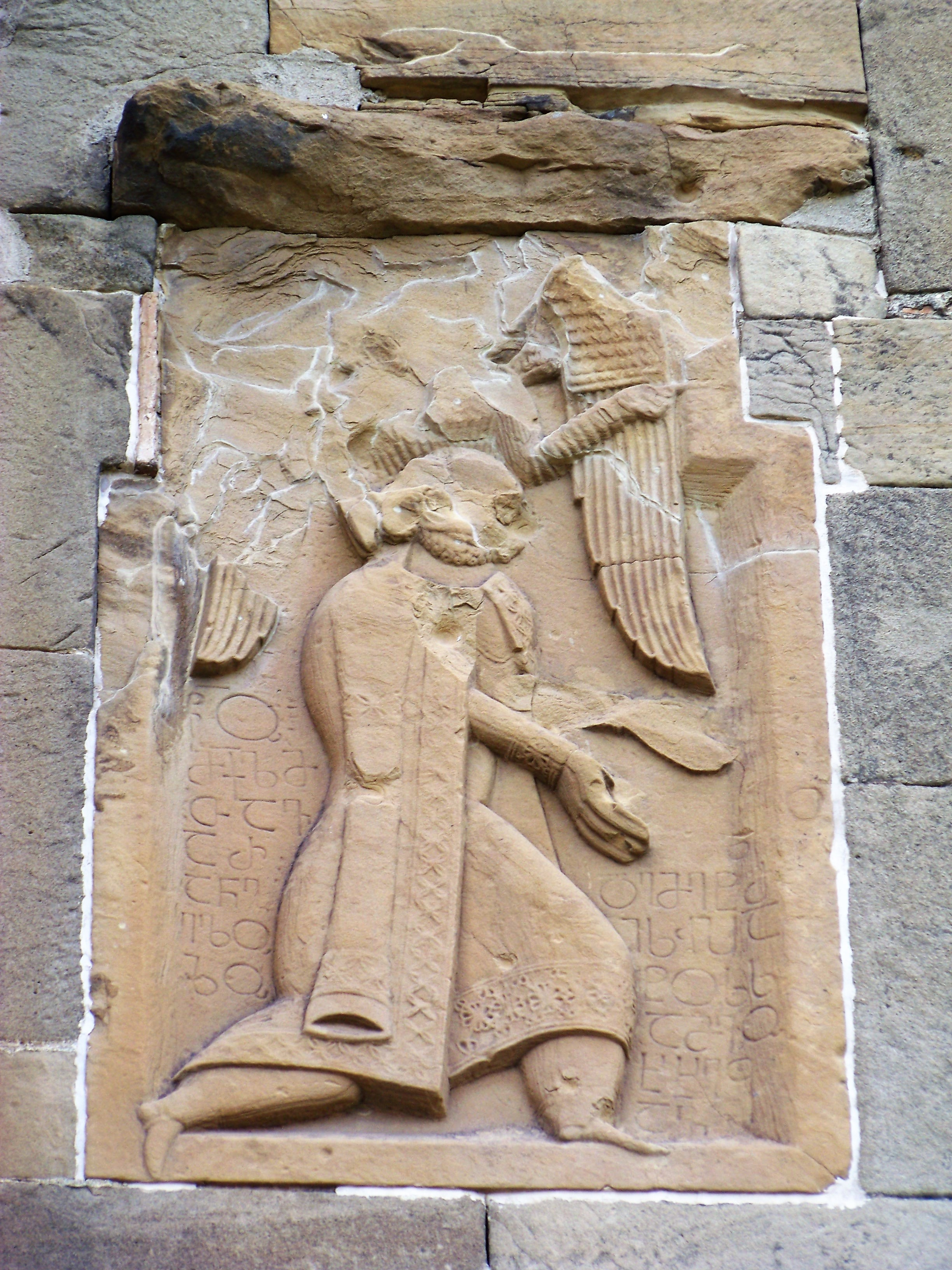
A plaque from Mtskheta, depicting Demetrius.

Demetre "Vipatosi" (Georgian: დემეტრე ჳიპატოსი, sometimes Latinized as Demetrius) was a Georgian nobleman from Iberia, and an honorary consul or hypatos. He may be identical with the brother of Prince Stephen I of Iberia known from the medieval historian Juansher as a church builder during his brother's tenure (c. 590–627). Professor Cyril Toumanoff of Georgetown University suggests that the title of hypatos may have been conferred after the death of his brother who was captured and executed at the behest of the Byzantine emperor Heraclius during the siege of Tbilisi in 627.

The exterior stone plaque of the church of the Holy Cross at Mtskheta, Georgia, mentions the principal builders of this church: Stephanos the patricius, Demetrius the hypatos, and Adarnase the hypatos who have traditionally been equated by the Georgian scholars with Stephen I, son of Guaram; Demetre, brother of Stephen I, and Adarnase I. However, an opinion expressed by Toumanoff disagrees with this view by identifying these individuals with Stephen II, Demetre (brother of Stephen I), and Adarnase II (son of Stephen II), respectively.
