= Siege of Tbilisi (627–628) =

Part of the Byzantine–Sassanid War of 602–628

- Part of Byzantine–Sasanian War of 602–628 and the Perso-Turkic war of 627–629
Date	627–628
Location	Tbilisi
Result	Byzantine victory

Belligerents
Sasanian Iberia; Sasanian Empire	Byzantine Empire; Western Turkic Khaganate

Commanders and leaders
Stephen I (executed); Shahraplakan	Heraclius; Böri Shad (AWOL); Tong Yabghu Qaghan (AWOL)

Strength
Unknown the number of Iberians; 1,000 Sasanids	40,000

The siege of Tbilisi, or Tiflis, was a siege by the Byzantine Empire and western Turkic Khaganate in 627–628 against Prince Stephen I of Iberia, the Sasanid vassal ruler of Sasanian Iberia.

== Background ==
During the siege of Constantinople, Heraclius formed an alliance with people Byzantine sources called the "Khazars", under Tong Yabghu Qaghan, now generally identified as the Western Turkic Khaganate of the Göktürks, plying him with wondrous gifts and the promise of marriage to the porphyrogenita Eudoxia Epiphania. Earlier, in 568, the Turks under Istämi had turned to Byzantium when their relations with Iran soured over commerce issues. Istämi sent an embassy led by the Sogdian diplomat Maniah directly to Constantinople, which arrived in 568 and offered not only silk as a gift to Justin II, but also proposed an alliance against Sasanian Iran. Justin II agreed and sent an embassy to the Turkic Khaganate, ensuring the direct Chinese silk trade desired by the Sogdians.

In the East, in 625, the Turks occupy Bactria and Afghanistan as far as the Indus, and establish the Yabghus of Tokharistan. The Turks, based in the Caucasus, responded to the alliance by sending 40,000 of their men to ravage the Iranian Empire in 626, marking the start of the Third Perso-Turkic War.

The continuing rivalry between the Byzantine and Sassanid Empires for supremacy in the Caucasus, and the unsuccessful insurrection (523) of the Georgians under Vakhtang I had severe consequences for Iberia. Thereafter, the king of Iberia had only nominal power, while the country was effectively ruled by the Persians. By the time of Vezhan Buzmihr's tenure as marzban of Iberia, the hagiographies of the period implied that the "kings" in Tbilisi had only the status of mamasakhlisi, which means "head of the (royal) house". When Bakur III died in 580, the Sassanid government of Persia under Hormizd IV (578-590) seized on the opportunity to abolish the Iberian monarchy. Iberia became a Persian province, administrated through its direct rule by appointed marzbans, which in fact was, as Prof. Donald Rayfield states; "a de jure continuation of de facto abolition of Iberian kingship since the 520s".

== Siege ==
In 627, Heraclius met his allies near Tbilisi and began a joint Byzantine and Göktürk operations to besiege Tbilisi, where the Byzantines used trebuchets to breach the walls, one of the first known uses by the Byzantines. In response, the Sassanian shah Khosrow II sent 1,000 cavalry under General Shahraplakan to reinforce the city. The siege dragged on without much progress, punctuated by frequent sallies on the part of the besieged. After two months the Khazars retreated to the steppe, promising to return by the autumn. Tong Yabghu left young Böri Shad, either his son or nephew, in charge of the remaining forty thousand which were to assist Heraclius during the siege. Before long these departed as well, leaving the Byzantines to continue the siege alone and prompting jeers from the besieged. In mid-September, whilst the siege proceeded, Heraclius marched south to secure his base in the upper Tigris. On December 12, he defeated the Sasanids in the Battle of Nineveh and marched to Ctesiphon, but before reaching the capital, Khosrow II was killed by his son Kavad, and in April 628 he made a truce with Heraclius. The truce was divisive, as Heraclius' allies continued the war in the Caucasus. In late 628, the allies captured Tbilisi, sacked and looted it, and Stephen I was skinned alive. Heraclius placed Adarnase on the throne of Iberia.
