= Stephen II of Iberia =

Prince of Iberia
- Reign: 637/642 - c. 650
- Predecessor: Adarnase I of Iberia
- Successor: Adarnase II of Iberia
- Issue: Adarnase II of Iberia
- House: Chosroid
- Father: Adarnase I of Iberia

Stephen II (Georgian: სტეფანოზ II, Step'anoz II), of the Chosroid dynasty, was a presiding prince of Iberia (Kartli, eastern Georgia) from 637/642 to c. 650.

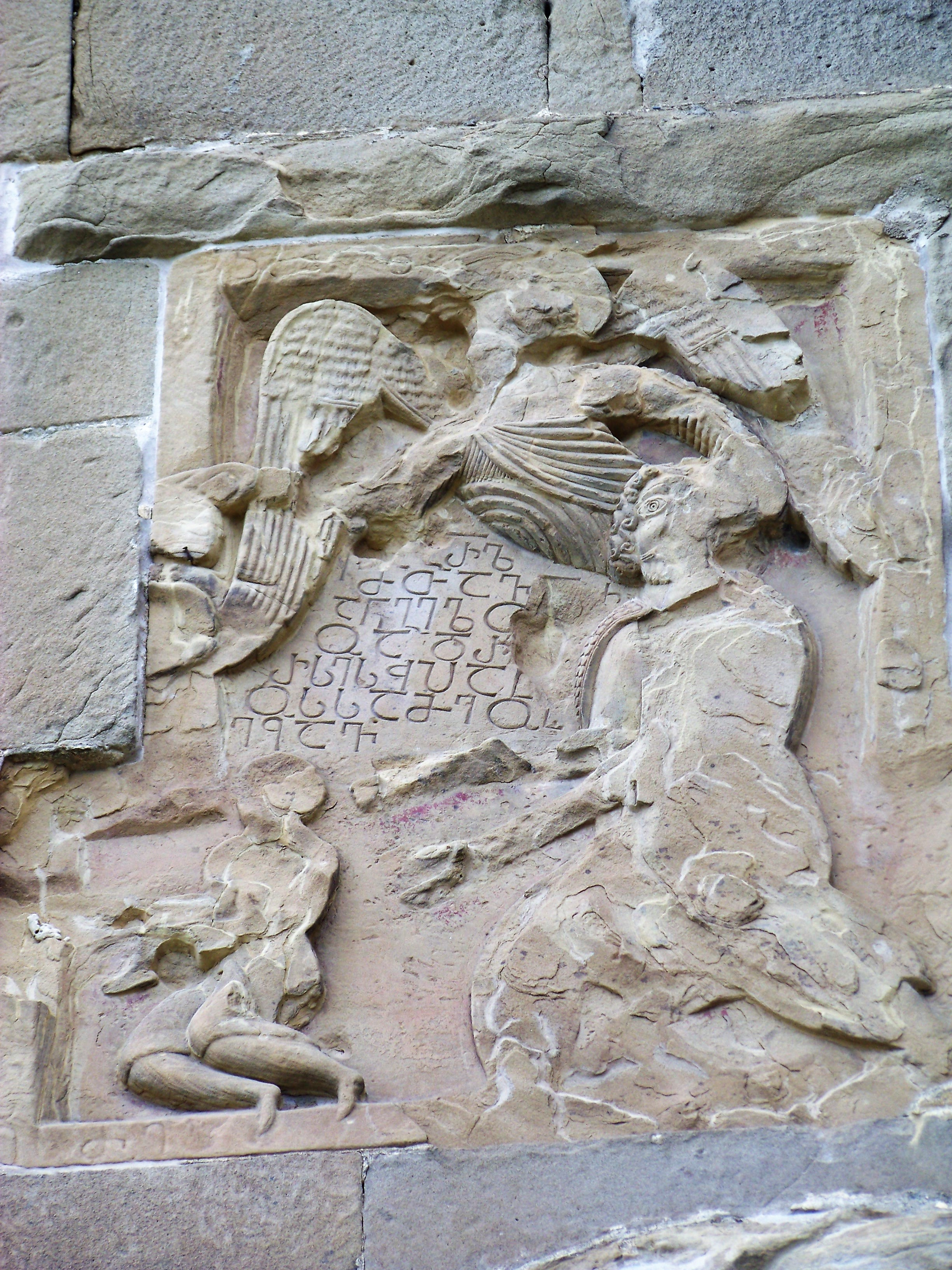
Adarnase with son. Eastern facade of Jvari Monastery („წმიდაო გაბრიელ მთავარანგელოზო, ადრნერსეს ჳპატოსსა მეოხ ეყავ“.).

The son and successor of Adarnase I, Stephen pursued his father's pro-Byzantine politics and was probably bestowed by the Emperor with the title of patricius. In 645, however, he was forced to recognize the Caliph as his suzerain when the Arabs moved into Georgia. He was succeeded by his son, Adarnase II.

The exterior stone plaque of the church of the Holy Cross at Mtskheta, Georgia, mentions the principal builders of this church: Stephanos the patricius, Demetrius the hypatos, and Adarnase the hypatos who have traditionally been equated by the Georgian scholars with Stephen I, son of Guaram; Demetre, brother of Stephen I and Adarnase I. However, an opinion expressed by Professor Cyril Toumanoff disagrees with this view by identifying these individuals with Stephen II, Demetre (brother of Stephen I), and Adarnase II (son of Stephen II), respectively.

Preceded by Adarnase I	Prince of Iberia; 637/642–c. 650	Succeeded by Adarnase II
