= Jvari Monastery =

Monastery in Georgia (country)

Coordinates: 41°50′19″N 44°44′02″E

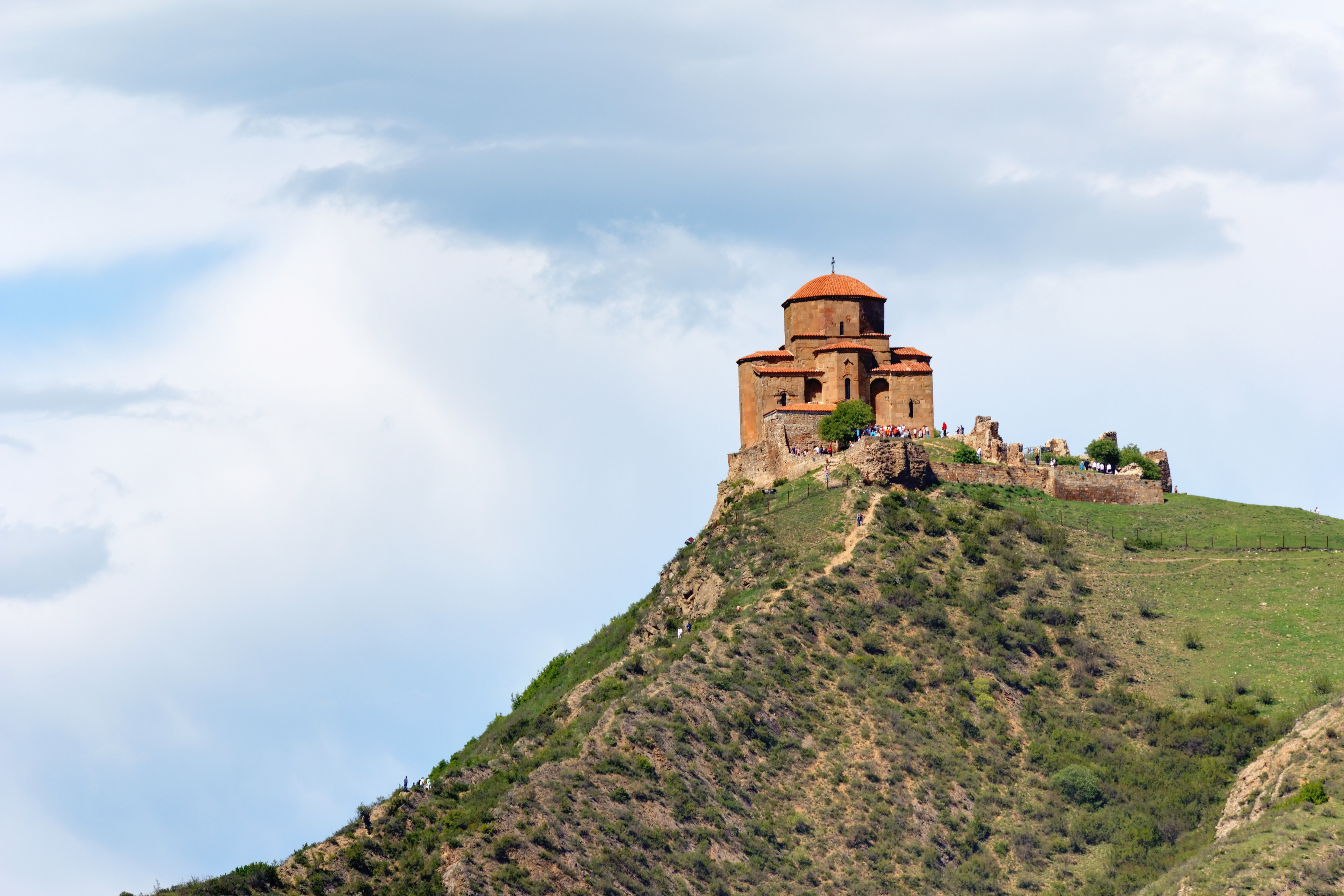
- Jvari Monastery

Religion
- Affiliation: Georgian Orthodox

Location
- Location: Mtskheta, Georgia
- Interactive map of Jvari Monastery

Architecture
- Type: Church
- Style: Tetraconch
- Completed: 586-605 AD, by King Stephen I of Kartli (Iberia)
- Height (max): 25 m
- UNESCO World Heritage Site
- Official name: Historical Monuments of Mtskheta
- Type: Cultural
- Criteria: iii, iv
- Designated: 1994 (18th session)
- Reference no.: 708
- Region: Caucasus

The name of this monastery translated as the "Monastery of the Cross". For other monasteries named after the cross, see Monastery of the Cross (disambiguation).

Jvari Monastery (Georgian: ჯვრის მონასტერი) is a sixth-century Georgian Orthodox monastery near Mtskheta, eastern Georgia. Jvari is a rare case of an Early Medieval Georgian church that has survived to the present day almost unchanged. The church became the founder of its type, the Jvari type of church architecture, prevalent in Georgia and Armenia. Built atop of Jvari Mount (656 m a.s.l.), the monastery is an example of harmonious connection with the natural environment, characteristic to medieval Georgian architecture. Along with other historic structures of Mtskheta, the monastery was listed as a World Heritage Site by UNESCO in 1994.

== History ==
Jvari Monastery stands on the rocky mountaintop at the confluence of the Mtkvari and Aragvi rivers, overlooking the town of Mtskheta, which was formerly the capital of the Kingdom of Iberia.

According to traditional accounts, on this location in the early 4th century Saint Nino, a female evangelist credited with converting King Mirian III of Iberia to Christianity, erected a large wooden (or vine) cross on the site of a pagan temple. The cross was reportedly able to work miracles and therefore drew pilgrims from all over the Caucasus. A small church was erected over the remnants of the wooden cross in c.545 during the rule of Guaram I, and named the "Small Church of Jvari", which can still be seen adjacent to the main church from the north.

The small church did not satisfy the needs of popular pilgrimage site, and the present building, or "Great Church of Jvari", is generally held to have been built between 590 and 605 by Guaram's son Erismtavari Stepanoz I. This is based on the Jvari inscriptions on its facade which mentions the principal builders of the church: Stephanos the patricius, Demetrius the hypatos, and Adarnase the hypatos. Professor Cyril Toumanoff disagrees with this view, identifying these individuals as Stepanoz II, Demetre (brother of Stepanoz I), and Adarnase II (son of Stepanoz II), respectively. Nino's cross remained inside of the church, and its original postament can still be found here.

In 914, during the Sajid invasion of Georgia, the church was burned by Arabs, but it managed to survive with only minor repairments.

The importance of Jvari complex increased over time and attracted many pilgrims. In the late Middle Ages, the complex was fortified by a stone wall and gate, remnants of which still survive. During the Soviet period, the church was preserved as a national monument, but access was rendered difficult by tight security at a nearby military base. After the independence of Georgia, the building was restored to active religious use. Jvari was listed together with other monuments of Mtskheta in 1994 as a UNESCO World Heritage Site.

However, over the centuries the structures suffered damage from rain and wind erosion and inadequate maintenance. Jvari was listed in the 2004 World Monuments Watch list by the World Monuments Fund.

== Architecture ==
Jvari Monastery. View from the southeast

Jvari is an example of a harmonic relationship between architecture and nature. The temple, which appears to be growing from the mountain, was built on a cliff. The western facade, strengthened by a controforse wall, nearly hangs over the precipice.

It has two entrances, from the north and from the south. The building has the shape of a cross, prolonged from east to west, with each arm ended by semicircular apses. The Jvari church is an early example of a "four-apsed church with four niches" domed tetraconch. Between the four apses are three-quarter cylindrical niches, which are open to the central space, and the transition from the square central bay to the base of the dome's drum is effected through three rows of squinches, an architectural achievement of its time. The lower row is made of four larger squinches, the two upper of smaller squinches, and finally the row of 32 facets, holding the dome. Thus, the dome rests on the walls, not on pillars, like in later churches, creating a single, entire space, and illusion of large size, although the church is less than 25 m high. Presence of high transitionary niches between the main space and the four small rooms is another trick of the architect, who wanted to diminish the contrast between large and small spaces. The Jvari church had a great impact on the further development of Georgian architecture and served as a model for many other churches.

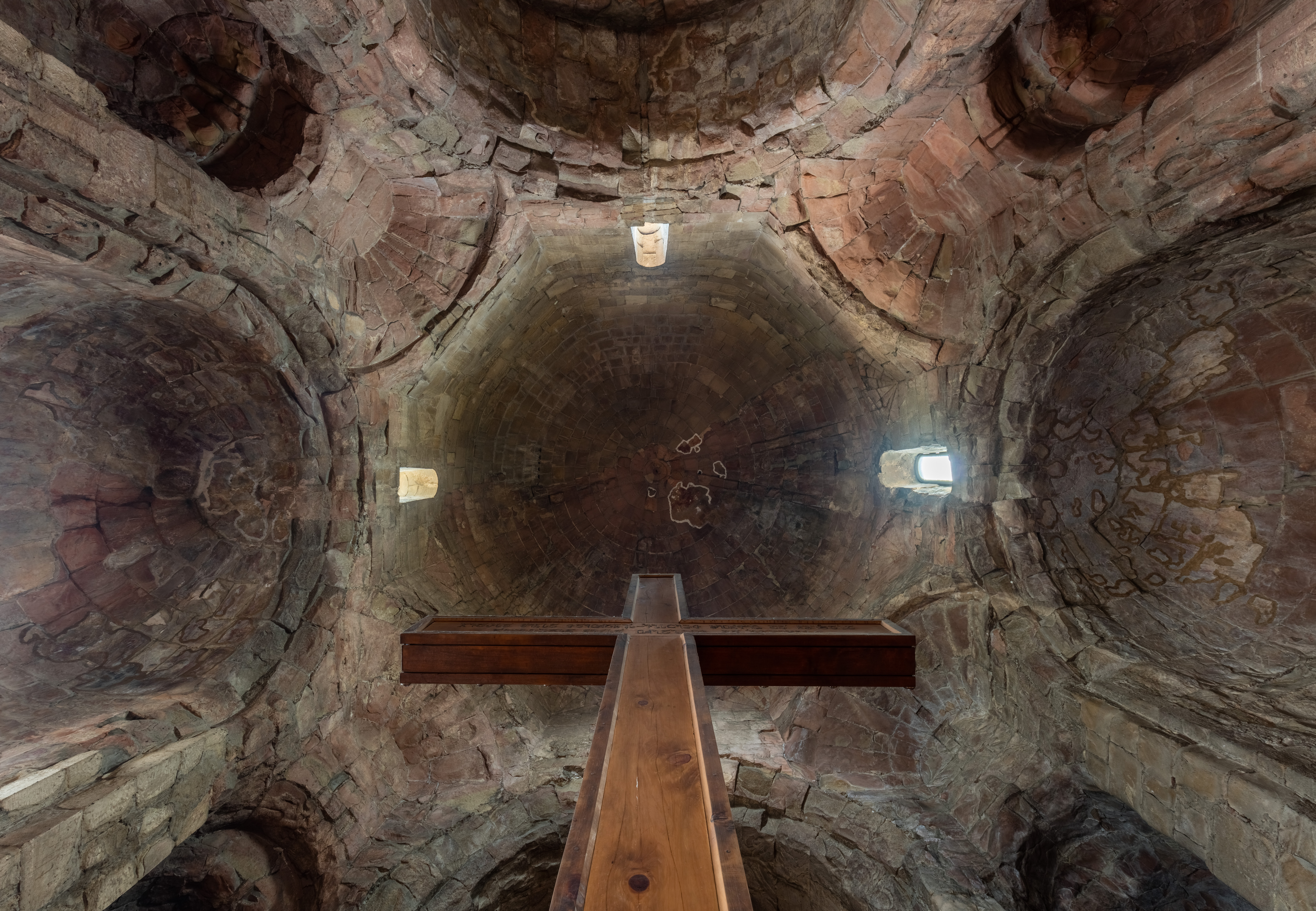
The view of the dome and the squinches inside the church

The leading element of the building, the dome, has an 8-faceted tholobate. Under the dome, near the center of the interior, stands a postament, surrounded by an octagon, important artistic addition, which was originally at the base of Nino's cross, but now holds a new wooden cross. The four cylindrical niches between the apses lead to four rooms: two in the eastern part, the altar and the sacristy, and two in the western, prayer rooms for the ruler (northwestern) and for women (southwestern). A writing above the latter room tells that its construction was funded by unknown Timistia. It also has a flat relief with depiction of the Ascension of Christ. Internal walls were originally covered with ashlar, and later plastered and painted in frescos, little of which survived.

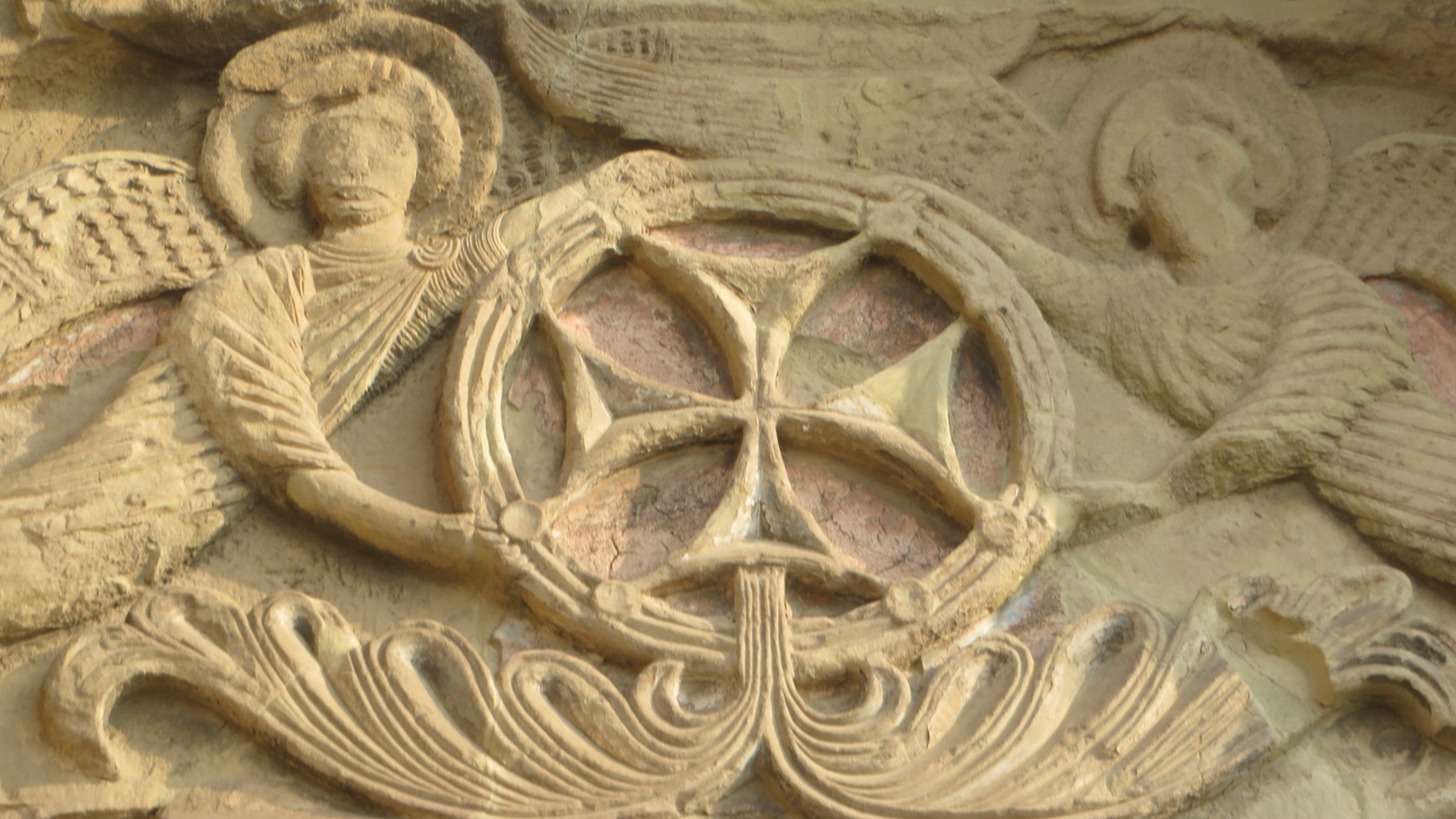
Ascension of the Cross, bas-relief above the southern entrance of the Jvari Monastery

Varied bas-relief sculptures with Hellenistic and Sassanian influences decorate its external observable eastern and southern façades, some of which are accompanied by explanatory inscriptions in Georgian Asomtavruli script. The entrance tympanum on the southern façade is adorned with a relief of the Glorification of the Cross, the same façade also shows an Ascension of Christ, a rather prevalent theme in Early Christian art. The cross, which is a traditional Bolnisi cross, is held by two angels. Northern façade is closed by a small earlier built church, as well as the western, visible from afar, are not decorated. Each window on the eastern façade has a decorative knob. Each of the three facets of the eastern apsis has a bas-relief, depicting rulers and noblemen. The left shows Demetre, the brother of Stepanoz I. The central depicts Stepanoz I in front of the Christ, which is also explained on the writing. The right bas-relief has Adrnerse the Hypatos with his son and archangels Gabriel and Michael flying above, but the identity is unclear, and some connect it with Adarnase I or Adarnase II. Another bas-relief, with Stepanoz II in front of the Christ, is found on the southern apsis. Possibly, the church architect, a kneeling figure, is depicted on the southern facet of the tholobate.

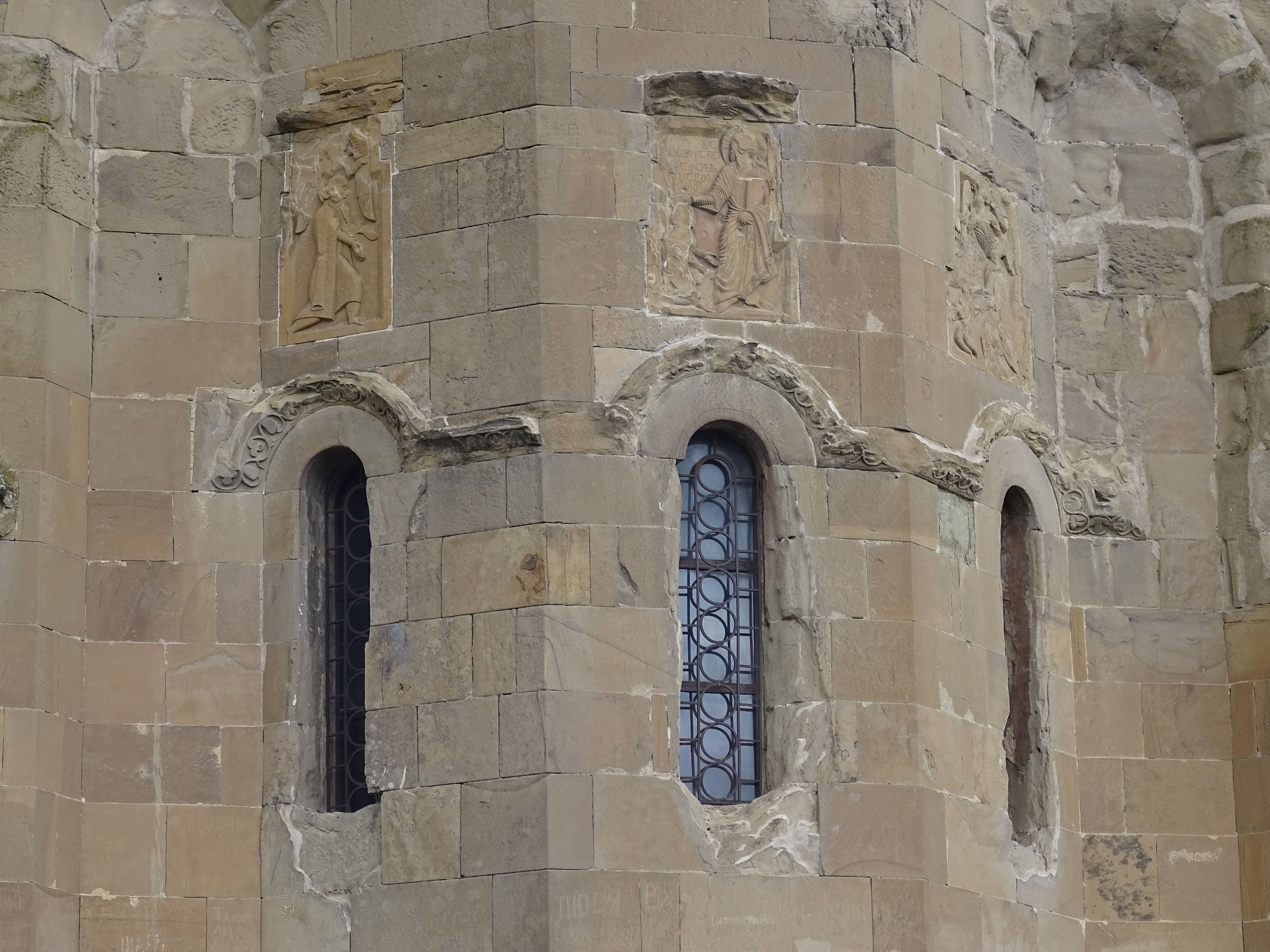
Decorations of the eastern apsis: knobs and bas-reliefs

The small Guaram's church, quadrangular in general proportions, has a cross-shaped interior. It is connected to a portal from the north, with the entrance to the church here and from the south. The church walls are covered by well-processed blocks. The conch was covered in mosaic, but only a fragment remains. A decorated niche is meant for the katolikos of Georgia. The southern entrance is decorated by capitals with ornamental leaves. A portal also connects the two churches.

The monastery complex is surrounded by remnants of walls with towers. The entrance with the gate was from the east.

Uncertainty over, and debate about, the date of the church's construction have assumed nationalist undertones in Georgia and Armenia. Each nation claims to have invented the "four-apsed church with four niches" form exhibited by Jvari.

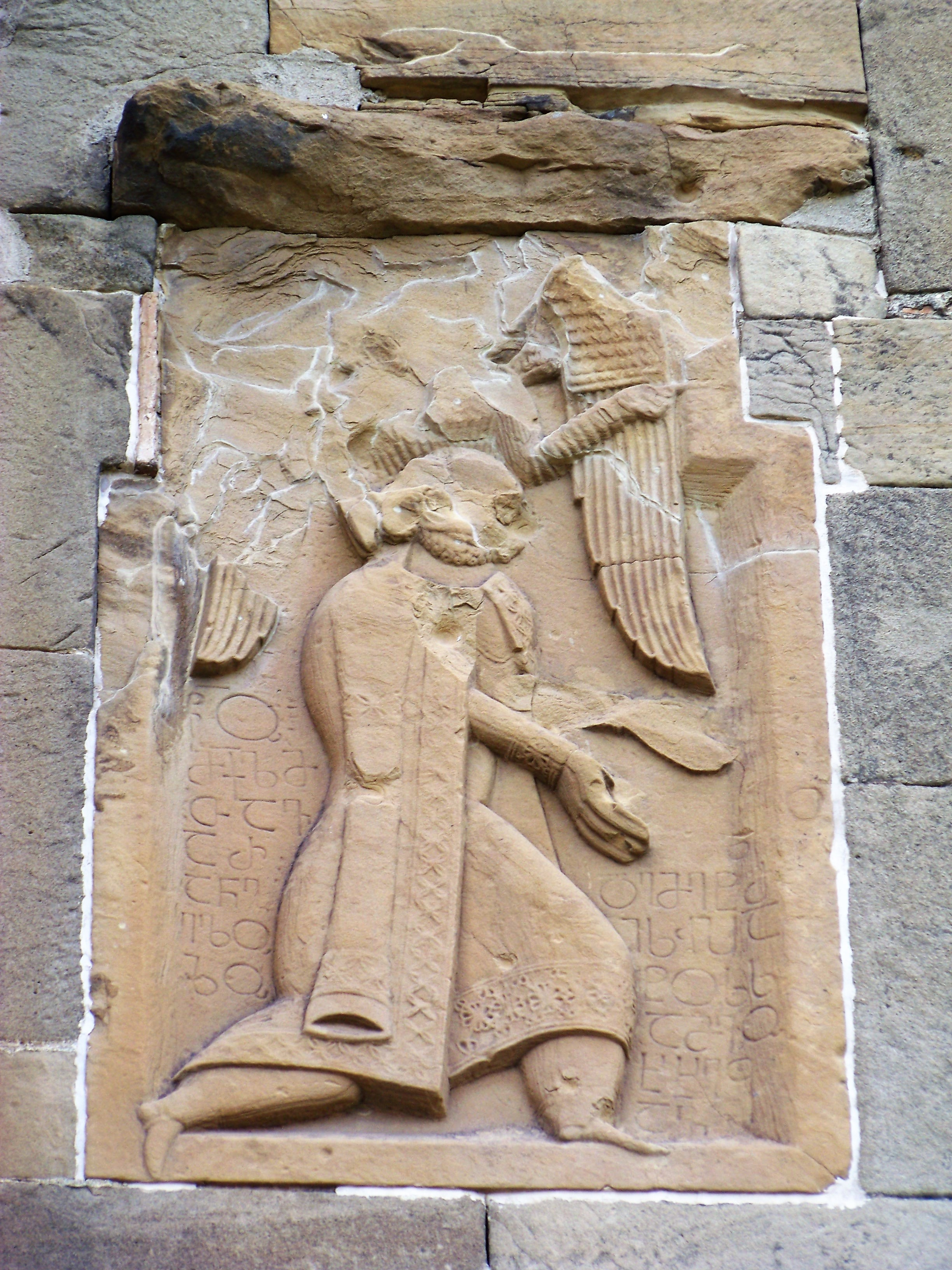
Demetre the Hypatos. Eastern façade.

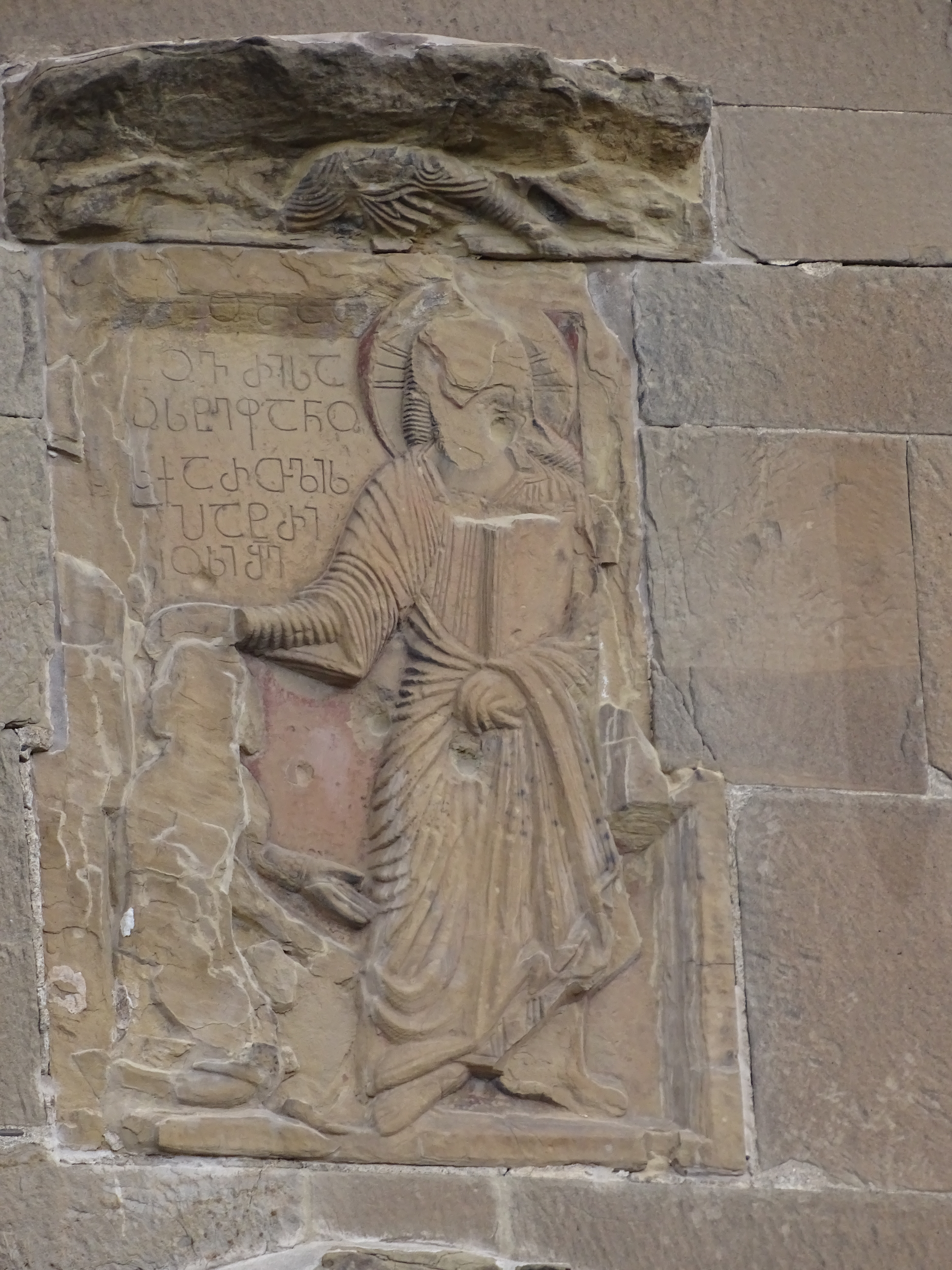
Stepanoz I in front of the Christ. Eastern façade.

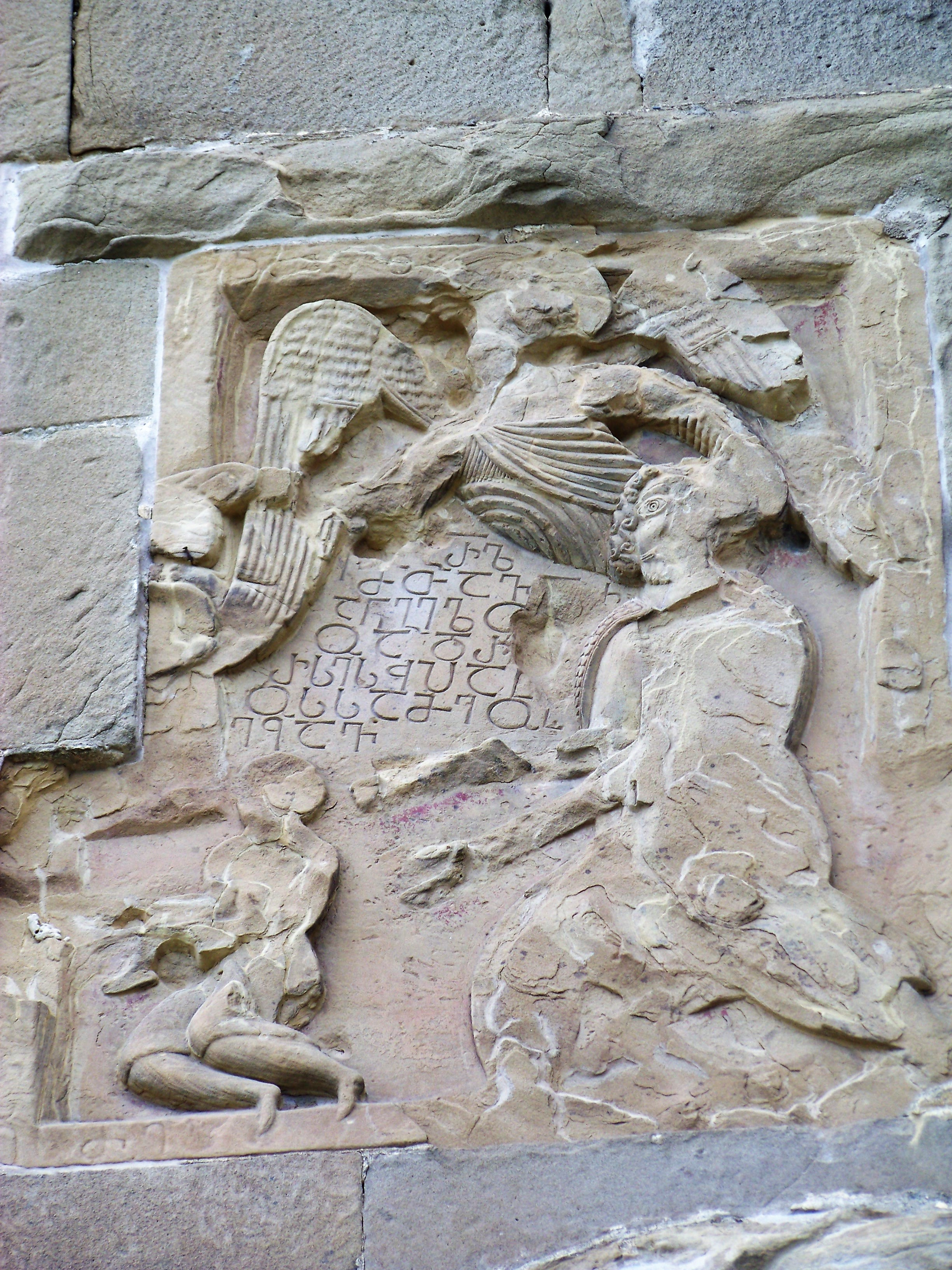
Adarnase with son. Eastern façade.

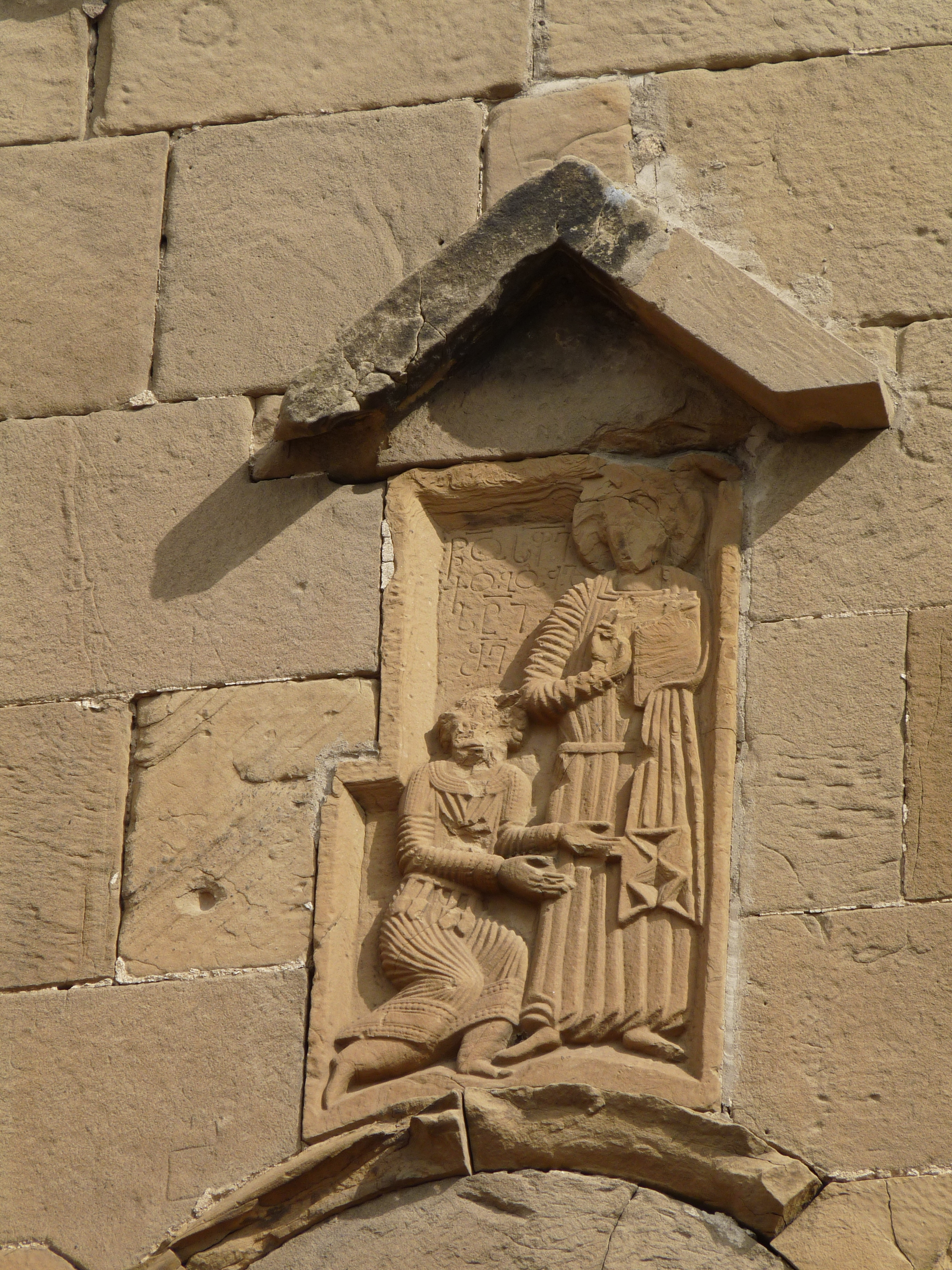
A 7th-century bas-relief from the Monastery of the Holy Cross at Mtskheta, Georgia. It depicts the 7th-century Georgian prince Adarnase praying before Jesus Christ.

== Threats ==
As of 2007 the monastery was under threat from erosion caused by acid rain and strong winds.

== Gallery ==
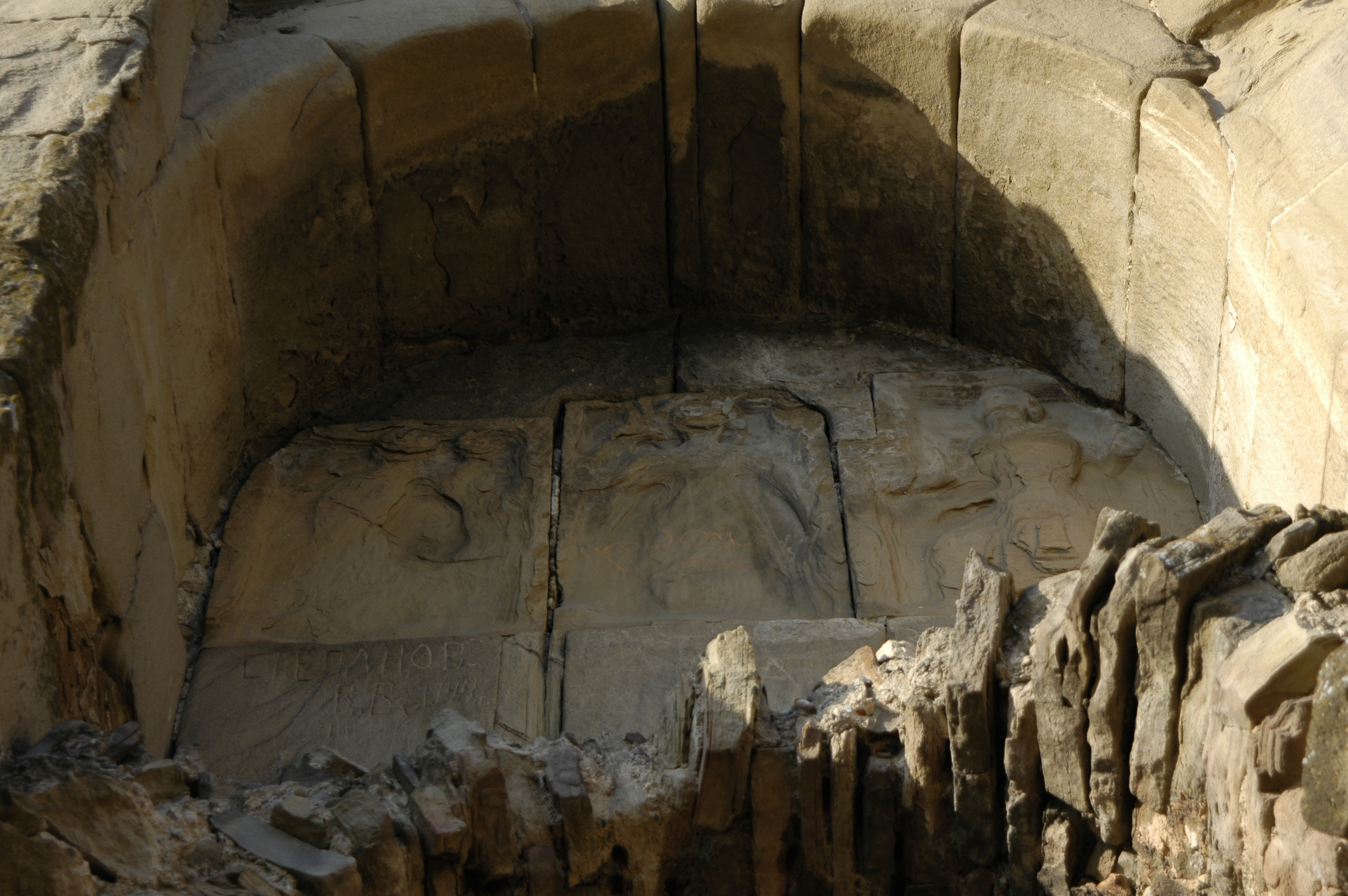
Georgia, Mtskheta, Jvari monastery. Stone carved relief on outer South wall.

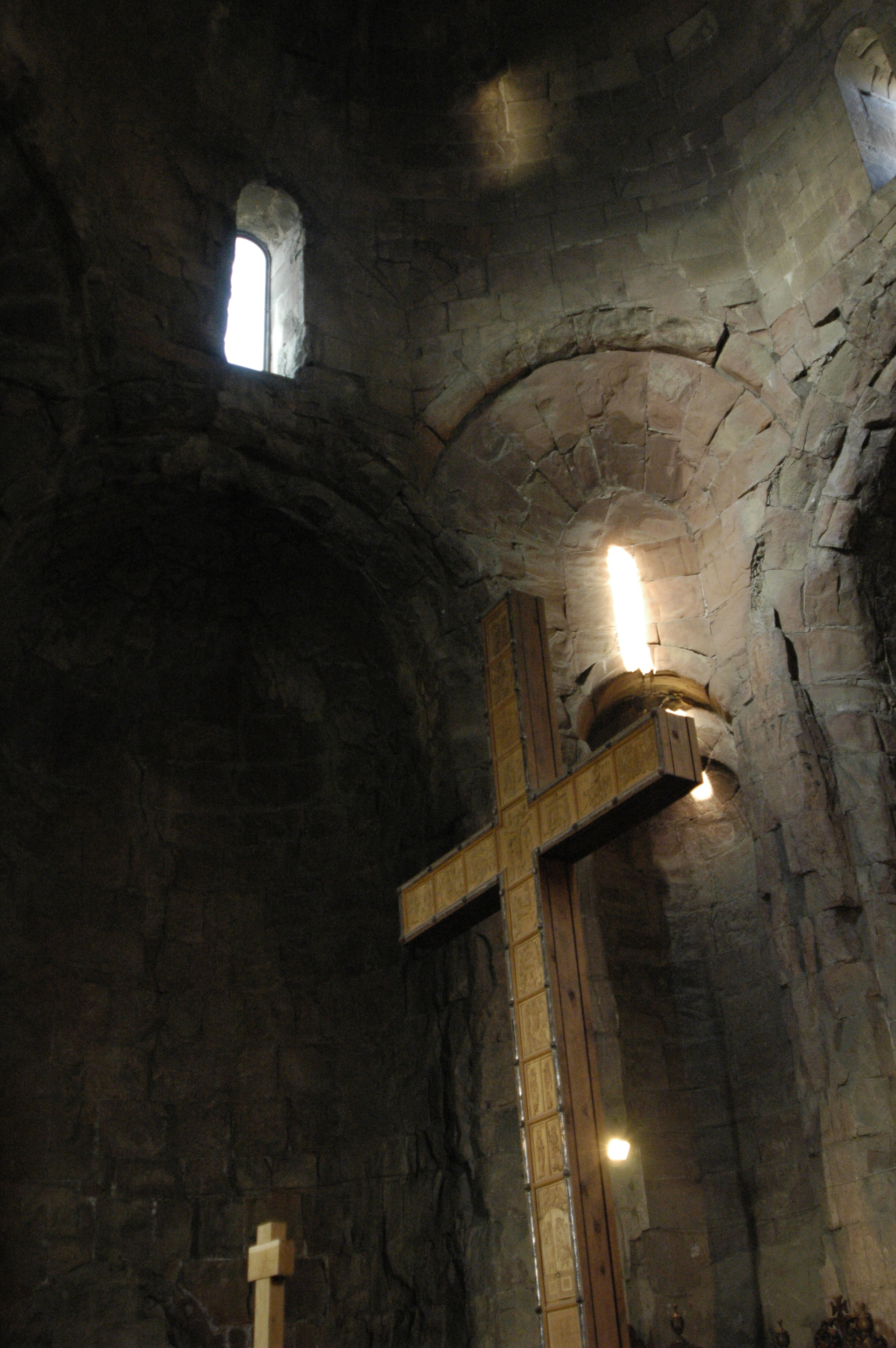
Jvari monastery, Mtskheta. Interior view with big wooden cross.

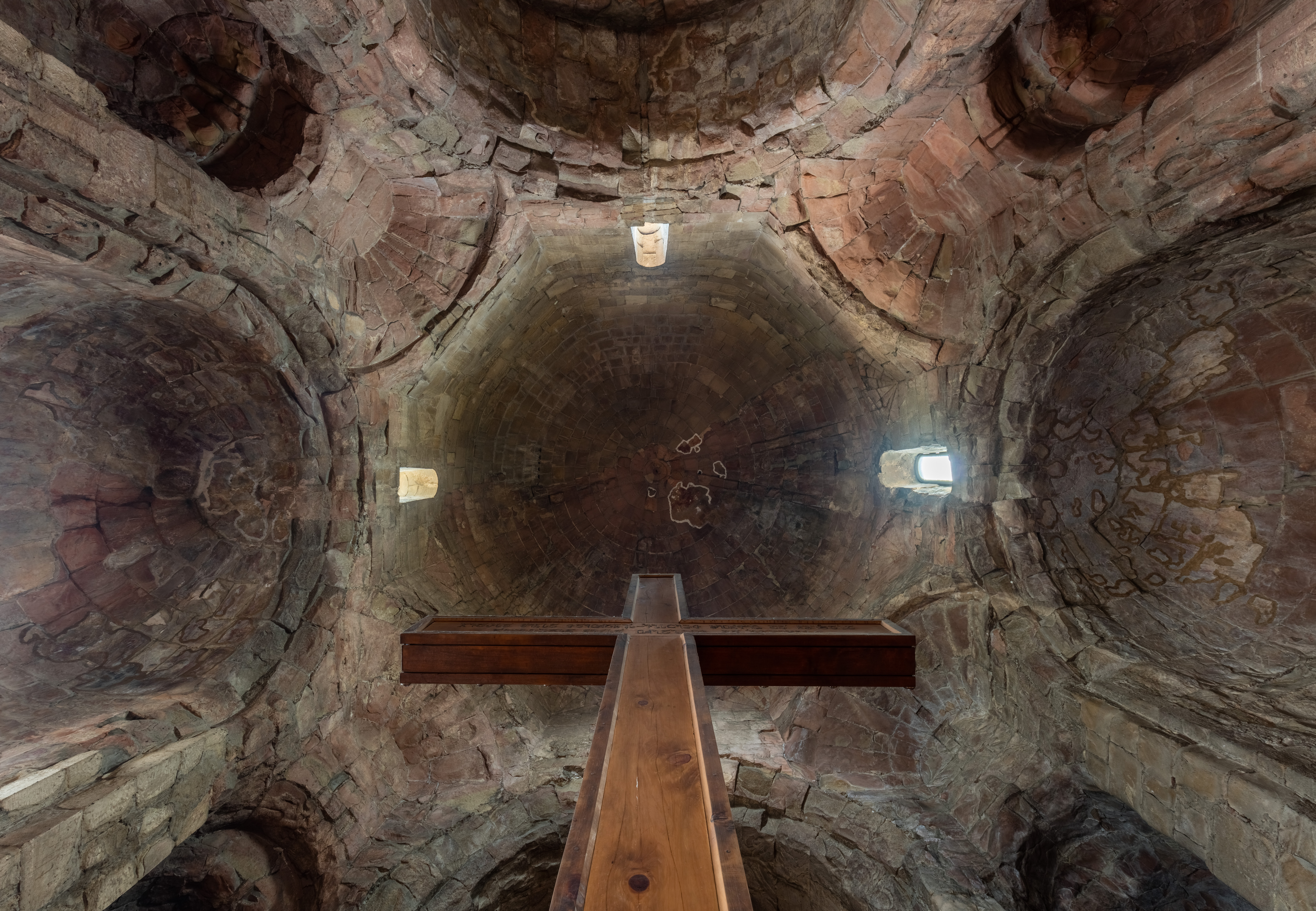
View of the cross and dome.

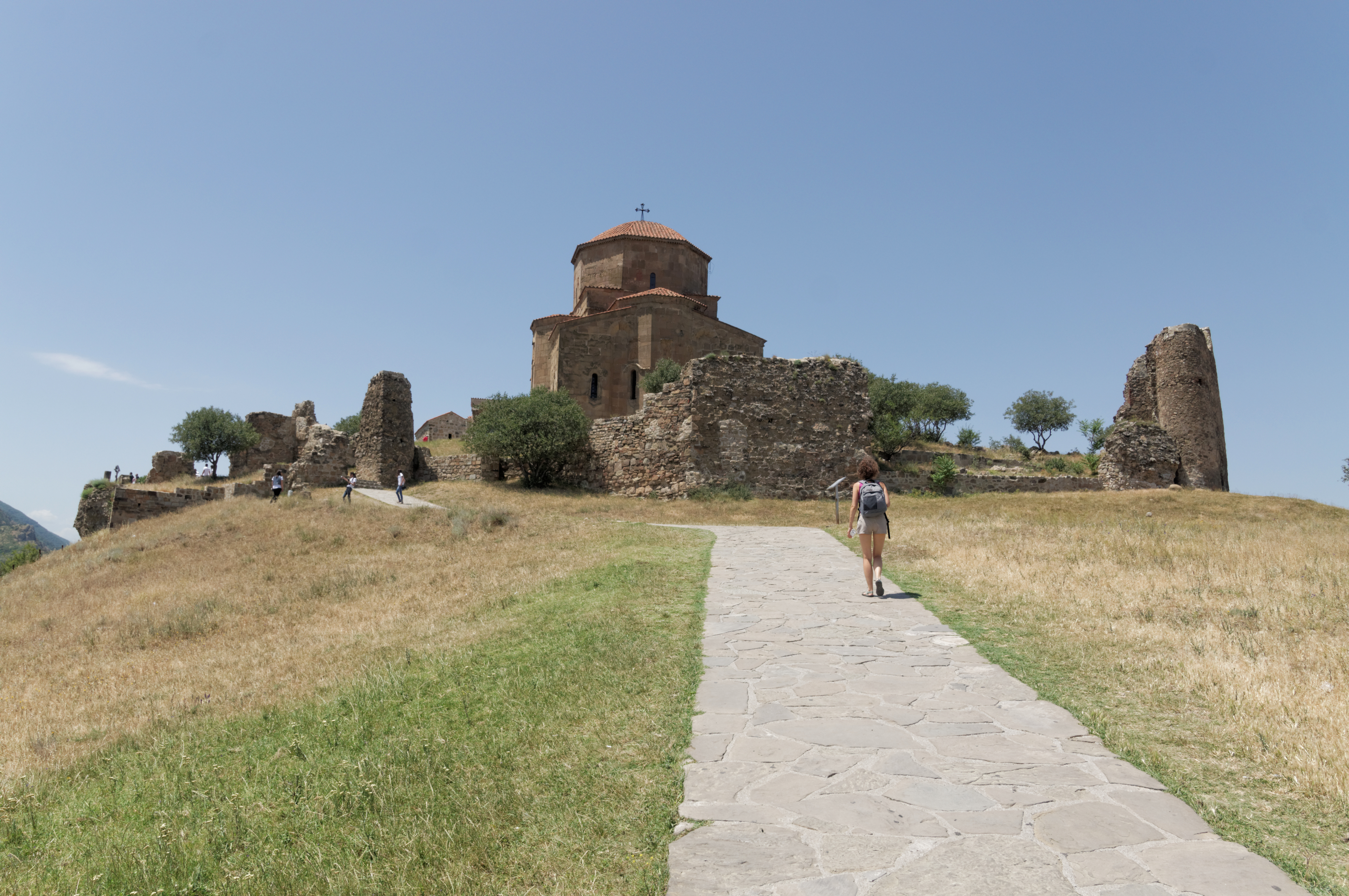
Access road

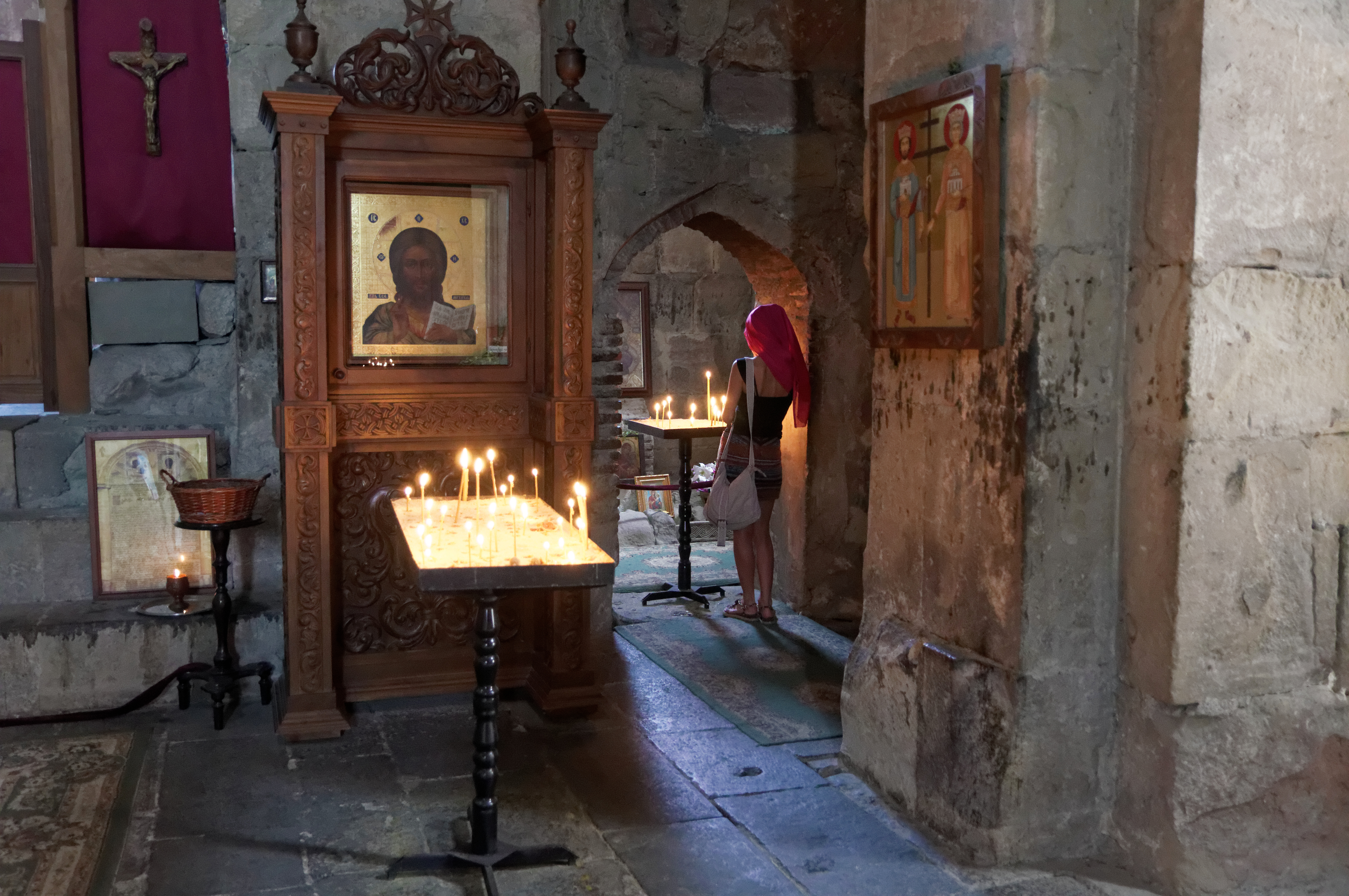
Icons and altars

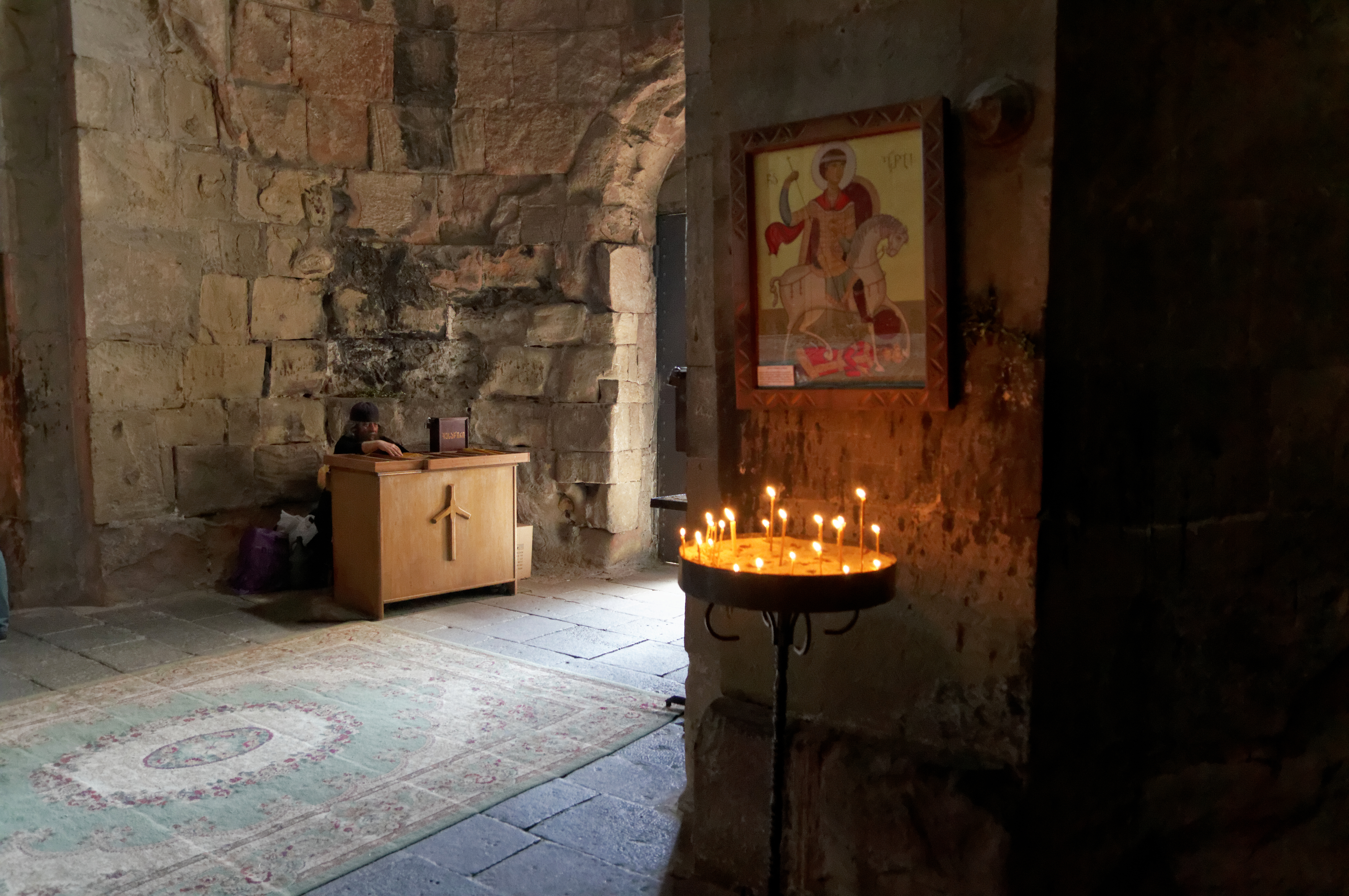
Entrance

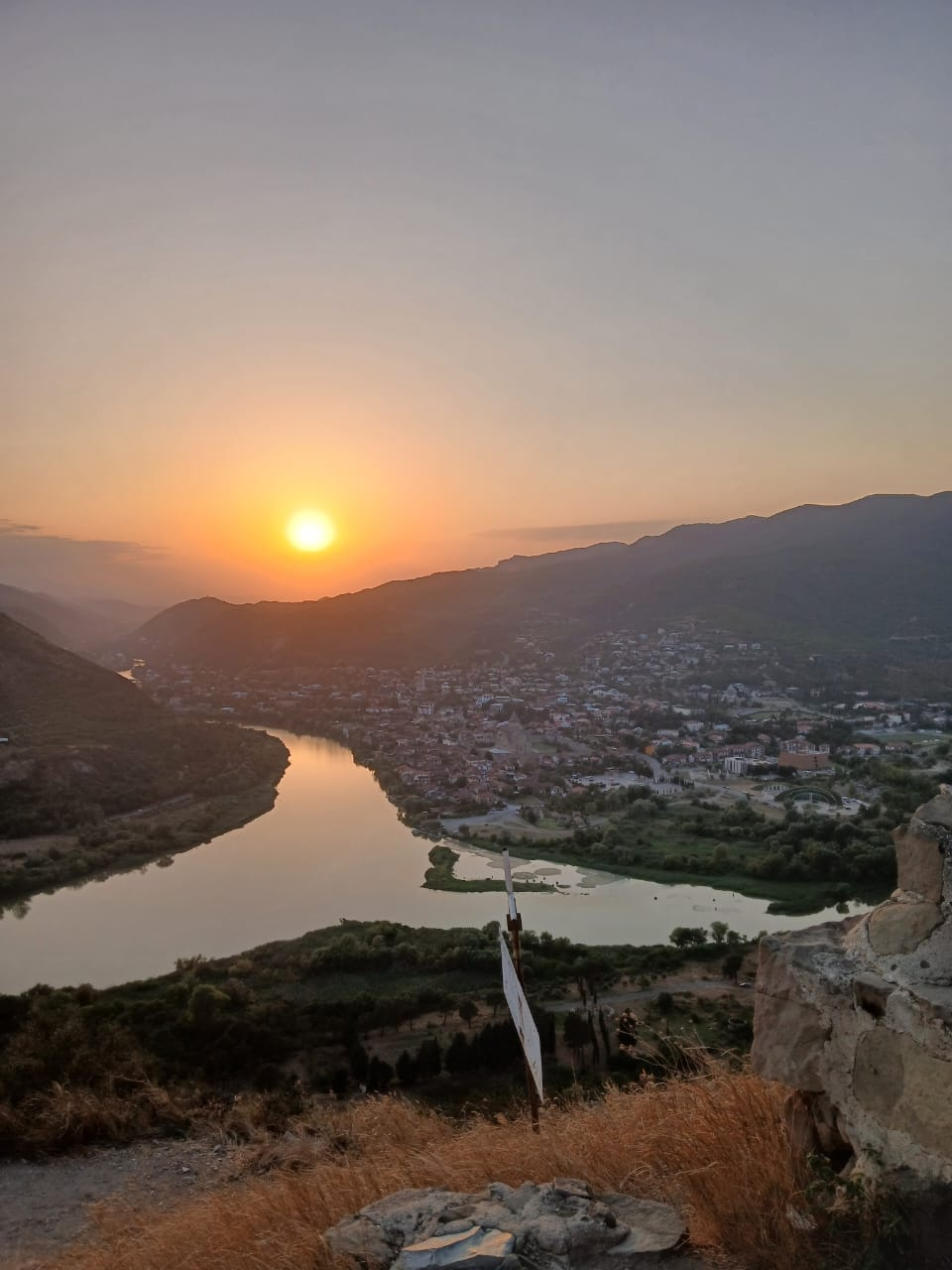
The view from Jvari Monastery
