= Stephen I of Iberia =

Stephen I
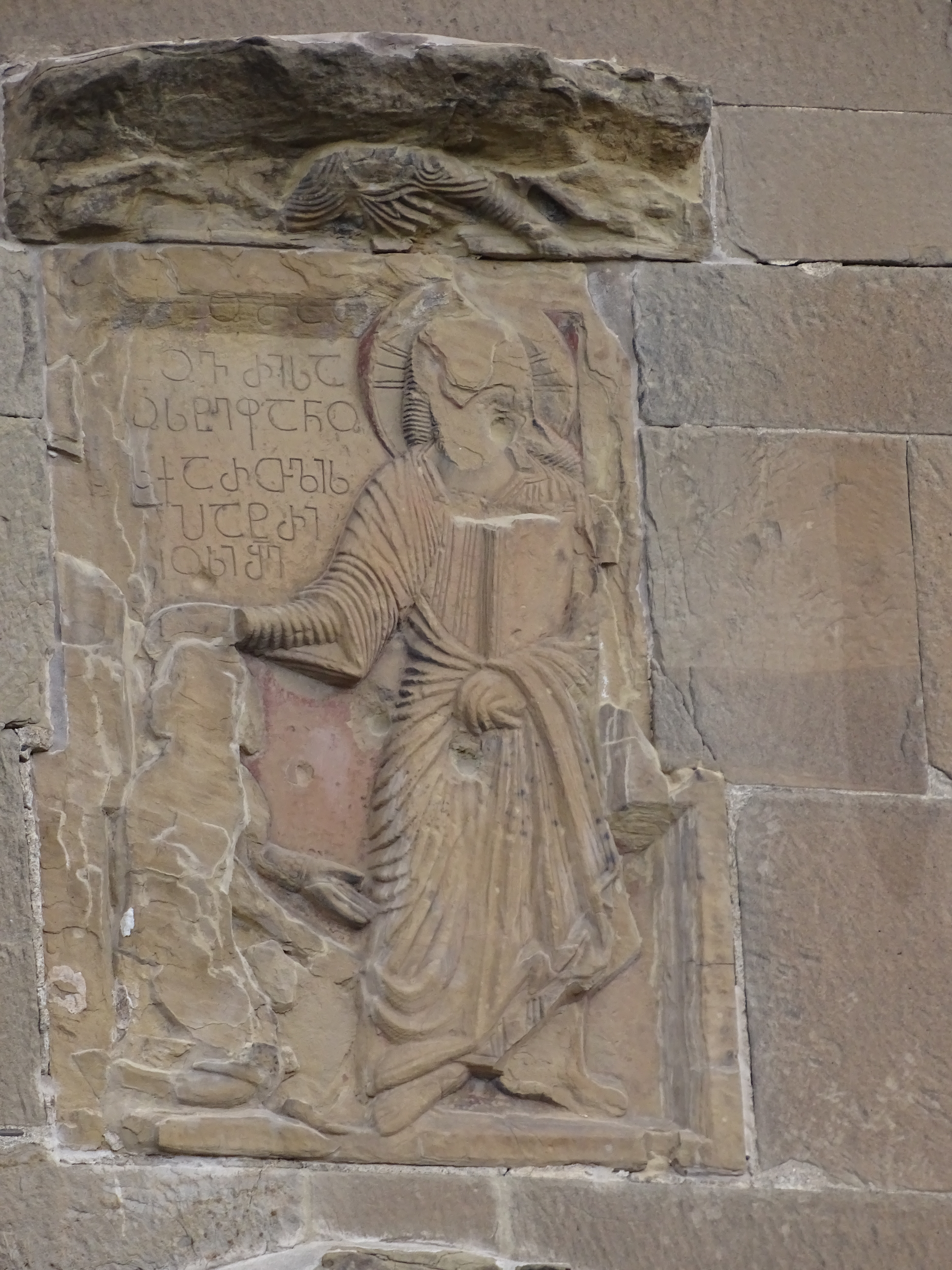

Ruler of Iberia
- Reign: 590 – 627
- Predecessor: Guaram I
- Successor: Adarnase I
- Died: 628
- Dynasty: Guaramid dynasty

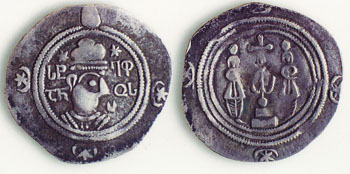
"Ibero-Sasanid" coin of Stephen I

Stephen I (Georgian: სტეფანოზ I, Step'anoz I or Stephanoz I; died 628), of the Guaramid Dynasty, was a presiding prince of Iberia (Kartli, central and eastern Georgia) from c. 590 to 627. He was killed following the Siege of Tbilisi by the invading Byzantine army.

== Life ==
The son and successor of Guaram I of Iberia, Stephen reversed his father’s pro-Byzantine politics to pro-Sasanian and, through loyalty to his Sasanid suzerains, succeeded in reuniting Iberia under his sway. He made Tbilisi his capital and defended it with a Georgian-Sasanian force from the army of Byzantine emperor Heraclius allied with the Khazars (see Byzantine–Sasanian War of 602–628). In 627, the Byzantine Empire and the Western Turkic Khaganate invaded Iberia placing Tbilisi under siege. The city fell in 628, and Stephen was flayed alive. His office was given to Adarnase I, his relative of the old Chosroid house.

The period of Stephen's rule coincided with another crucial moment in the history of Georgia. When Stephen switched from a pro-Byzantine position to cooperation with the Sasanid Empire, his religious sympathies shifted toward anti-Chalcedonism, leading to its official adoption by the catholicos of Iberia in 598 or 599. By 608, however, the Georgian Orthodox Church returned to a Chalcedonic position, prompting the sister church of Armenia to break communion with the Georgian church and excommunicate its catholicos Kirion I. It was Heraclius’s campaign, however, that brought about the final victory of Chalcedonian faith in Iberia.

== Numismatics ==
Stephen I was the first among the Georgian rulers who inscribed on the obverse of the "Ibero-Sasanid" drachmas minted by himself the initials of his name, symmetrically placed on the border in Georgian stylized letters. On the reverse of his coins, instead of the sacred flame (Atar), the principal emblem of Zoroastrianism, he placed the Cross – symbol of the victory of Christianity. This was a significant political act pointing not to Stephen’s mere Iranophilia, but rather to his efforts to reestablish the political autonomy of eastern Georgia and strengthen the Christian church.

== Architecture ==
The exterior stone plaque of the church of the Holy Cross at Mtskheta, Georgia, mentions the principal builders of this church: Stephanos the patricius, Demetrius the hypatos, and Adarnase the hypatos who have traditionally been equated by the Georgian scholars with Stephen I, son of Guaram; Demetre, brother of Stephen I and Adarnase I. However, an opinion expressed by Professor Cyril Toumanoff disagrees with this view by identifying these individuals with Stephen II, Demetre (brother of Stephen I), and Adarnase II (son of Stephen II), respectively.

== See also ==
- Sasanian Iberia

== Sources ==
- Baumer, Christoph (2021). History of the Caucasus. Vol. 1: At the Crossroads of Empires. I.B. Tauris.

Preceded by Guaram I	Prince of Iberia; 590–627	Succeeded by Adarnase I
