= Adarnase I =

Prince of Iberia from 627 to c. 640

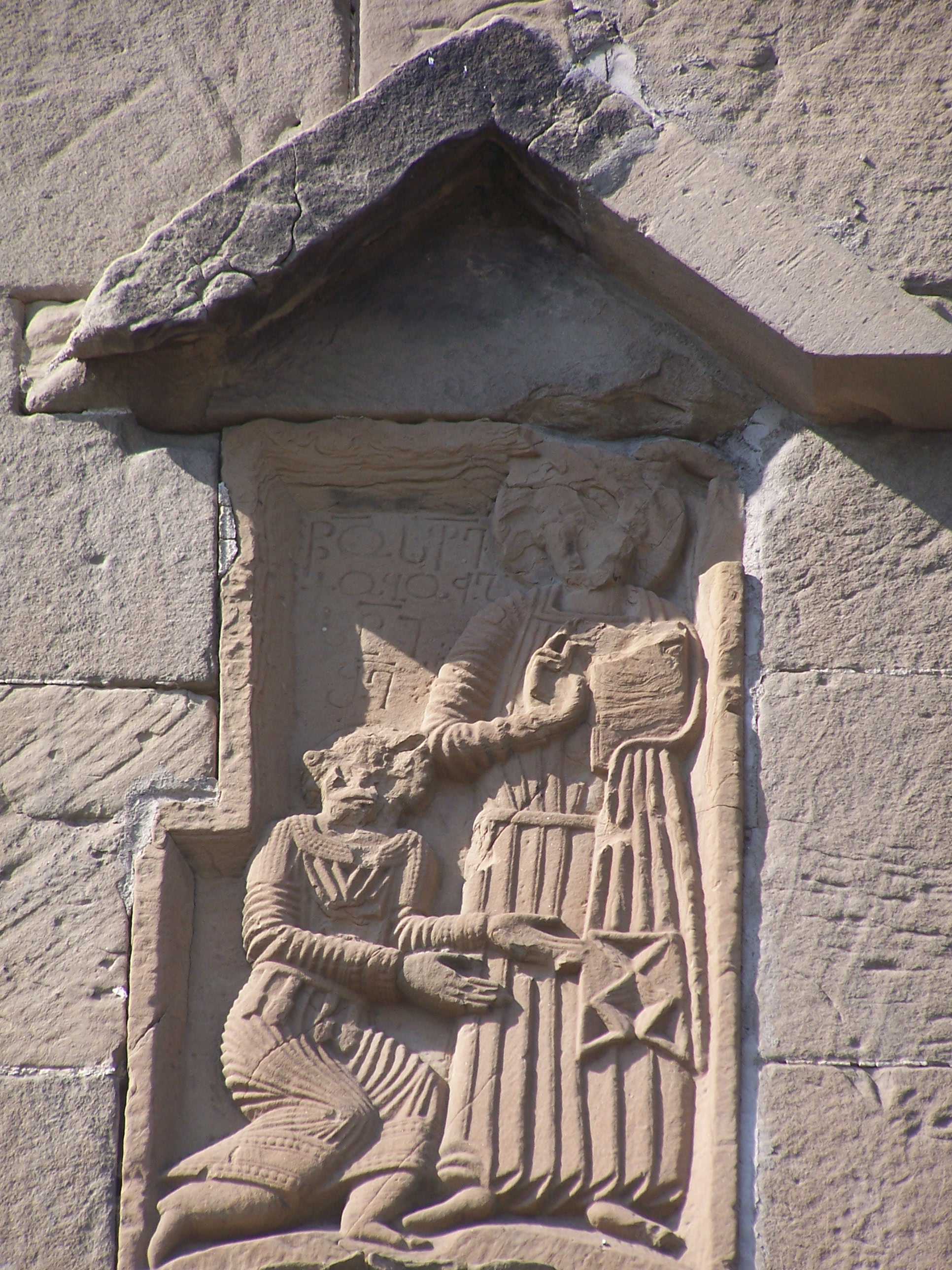
- A bas-relief from Mtskheta depicting Adarnase I praying before Jesus.

Ruler of Iberia
- Reign: 627 -637/642
- Predecessor: Stephen I
- Successor: Stephen II
- Issue: Stephen II of Iberia
- Dynasty: Chosroid dynasty

Adarnase I (Georgian: ადარნასე I) or Adrnerse (ადრნერსე, also transliterated as Atrnerseh), of the Chosroid dynasty, was a presiding prince of Iberia (Kartli, eastern Georgia) from 627 to 637/642.

The name Adarnase derives from Middle Persian Ādurnarsēh, with the second component of the word (Nase) being the Georgian attestation of the Middle Persian name Narseh, which ultimately derives from Avestan nairyō.saŋya-. The Middle Persian name Narseh also exists in Georgian as Nerse. The name Ādurnarsēh appears in the Armenian language as Atrnerseh.

He was the son of Bakur III, the last king of Iberia, and a hereditary duke (eristavi) of Kakheti. In 627, he assisted the Byzantine-Khazar army with the siege of Tbilisi and was made ruler of Iberia by the Byzantine emperor Heraclius who had the pro-Sasanid prince Stephanus I executed. Somewhere between 637 and 642 (i.e., after the battle of al-Qādisiyyah and before that of Nihawānd), he joined his forces with the Albanian prince Javanshir in an attack on Iranian garrisons in Albania.

According to the seventh-century historian Movses Daskhurantsi, Adarnase wore three Byzantine titles. He is identified by the art historian Wachtang Djobadze with the honorary consul Adarnase (Adrnerse hypatos) recorded on an inscription from the Jvari Monastery at Mtskheta, Georgia. Cyril Toumanoff argues, however, that this Adrnerse is actually Adarnase II active in the late seventh century. His other titles are likely to have been those of patrikios and perhaps stratelates. He was the father of and was succeeded by Stephen II of Iberia.

Preceded by Stephen I	Prince of Iberia; 627–637/642	Succeeded by Stephen II
