= Cyril Toumanoff =

Georgian-American historian and genealogist (1913-1997)

Cyril Leo Toumanoff (Georgian: კირილ თუმანოვი; Russian: Кирилл Львович Туманов; 10 October 1913 – 4 February 1997) was a Georgian-American historian, and academic genealogist who mostly specialized in the history and genealogies of medieval Georgia, Armenia, Iran, and the Byzantine Empire. Born in the Russian Empire into a princely family, Toumanoff escaped to the United States after the Russian Revolution. His works have significantly influenced the Western scholarship of the medieval Caucasus.

== Family ==
Cyril Toumanoff was born on 10 October 1913 in Saint Petersburg, the son of Prince Leo Tumanov, a military officer of the Russian Imperial army. His father, who was born in Yerevan, was descended from the Armeno-Georgian princely family of Tumanishvili (Russified to Tumanov) whose ancestors had emigrated from their original homeland in Cilician Armenia in the 15th century. This family is on the list of the Georgian princes that was attached to the Treaty of Georgievsk concluded between the Georgian king Erekle II and the Russian empress Catherine II in 1783. On December 6, 1850, the Tumanishvili were officially enrolled on the Russian Empire's list of Georgian princely families as knyaz Tumanov. Toumanoff's mother, Yelizaveta Zhdanova, was a descendant of a number of Russian noble families, with genealogical ties with Western European nobility.

== Career ==
Toumanoff's parents fled the October Revolution in Saint Petersburg in 1917. His father joined the White Russian forces during the Russian Civil War, while his mother was executed by the Bolsheviks. Cyril Toumanoff was initially sheltered by his maternal grandparents in Astrakhan before the family fled to Serbia. In 1925, he and his father escaped to the United States. He graduated from the Lenox School in 1931 and went to Harvard University. He then studied Armenology in Brussels under Nicholas Adontz and Georgian in Berlin under Michael Tsereteli. During these years, Toumanoff converted to Roman Catholicism. A breach with his Orthodox Christian father ensued which ended when they reconciled at the latter's deathbed in 1943.

Toumanoff earned a doctorate from the Georgetown University in 1943 and soon accepted a position there which he held until his retirement as a professor emeritus of history in 1970. Thereafter he moved to Rome. An authority on nobiliary and dynastic questions, Toumanoff was also a Professed Knight of the Sovereign Military Order of Malta, High Historical Consultant, Grand Magistry, and the Grand Prior of Bohemia. Having taken religious orders he became known as Fra Cyril.

Toumanoff died in 1997 in Rome at the age of 83. He is buried at the chapel of the Knights of Malta at Campo Verano, Rome.

== Bibliography ==
- "On the Relationship between the Founder of the Empire of Trebizond and the Georgian Queen Thamar", Speculum 15 (1940).
- "Medieval Georgian Historical Literature (VIIth-XVth Centuries)", Traditio 1 (1943).
- "Caesaropapism in Byzantium and Russia," Theological Studies, VII (1946).
- "The Old Manuscript of the Georgian Annals: The Queen Anne Codex (QA) 1479-1495", Traditio 5 (1947)
- "The Early Bagratids. remarks in connexion with some recent publications", Le Muséon 62 (1949).
- "The Fifteenth-Century Bagratids and the institution of Collegial Sovereignty in Georgia", Traditio 7 (1949–1951)
- "Christian Caucasia between Byzantium and Iran. New light from Old Sources", Traditio 10 (1954).
- "Moscow the Third Rome: genesis and significance of a politico-religious idea", The Catholic Review 40:4 (1955).
- (in French) "La noblesse géorgienne sa genèse et sa structure", Rivista Araldica, Sett (1956).
- "Chronology of the Kings of Abasgia and Other Problems", Le Muséon 69 (1956)
- "Caucasia and Byzantine Studies", Traditio 12 (1956)
- "The Bagratids of Iberia from the Eighth to the Eleventh Century", Le Muséon 74 (1961)
- "The dates of the Pseudo-Moses of Chorene", Handes Amsorya 75 (1961)
- Studies in Christian Caucasian History (Georgetown University Press, 1963).
- "Armenia and Georgia", in The Cambridge Medieval History IV (1966).
- "Chronology of the Early Kings of Iberia", Traditio 25 (1969).
- The Order of Malta and the Russian Empire (Rome, 1969) with Olgerd de Sherbowitz-Wetzor.
- "The Mamikonids and the Liparitids", Armeniaca Venise (1969).
- "The Third-Century Armenian Arsacids: A chronological and Genealogical Commentary", Revue des Études Arméniennes 6 (1969): 233-281.
- "Caucasia and Byzantium", Traditio 27 (1971)
- (in French) "L’Ordre de Malte dans l’Empire de Russie : Grand-Prieuré Catholique de Russie", Rivista Araldica (maggio-giugno 1973)
- (in French) Manuel de généalogie et de chronologie pour l’histoire de la Caucasie chrétienne (Arménie, Géorgie, Albanie) (Rome: Aquila, 1976).
- (in French) "Aransahikides ou Haykides? Derniers rois de Siounie", Handes Amsorya (1976)
- (in French) Catalogue de la Noblesse titrée de l’Empire de Russie (Rome, 1982).
- (in French) Les Maisons Princières Géorgiennes de l’Empire de Russie (Rome, 1983).
- "The Albanian Royal Succession", Le Muséon 97 (1984).
- The Social Myth: Introduction to Byzantinism (Rome: Viella, 1984).
- "Heraclids and the Arsacids", Revue des Études Arméniennes 19 (1985).
- "Problems of Aransahikid Genealogy", Le Muséon 98 (1985).
- "More on the Mamikonids and the Liparitids" (1986).
- (in French) Les dynasties de la Caucasie chrétienne de l’Antiquité jusqu’au XIXe siècle; Tables généalogiques et chronologiques, *Rome, 1990).
- "The Princely Nobility of Georgia" (1997).
