= Orkhevi, Tbilisi =

Settlement/suburb in the Samgori district of Tbilisi, Georgia

Orkhevi ორხევი Formal: ორხევის დასახლება
- Settlement, suburb

Georgian transcription(s)
  - Official romanization: Orkhevi
  - Official romanization (formal): Orkhevis dasakhleba
  - IPA: pronounced [ɔrxɛvi]
  - IPA (formal): pronounced [ɔrxɛvis dasaxlɛba]
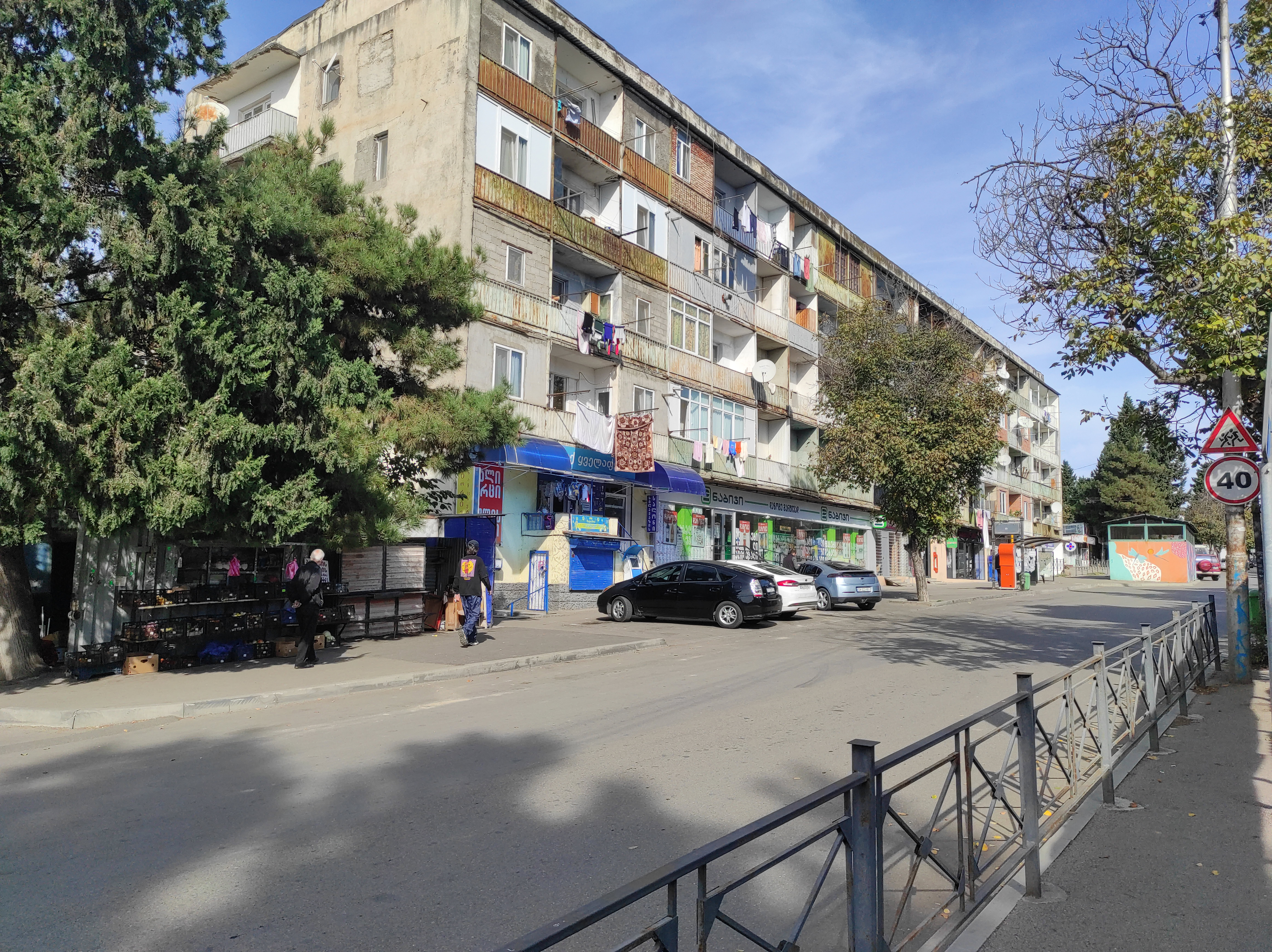
- A view of Mukhadze Street in Orkhevi
- Etymology: From Georgian: ორი ხევი (ori khevi), "two ravines"
- Interactive map of Orkhevi
- Location of Orkhevi in Georgia
- Coordinates: 41.694155°N 44.92537°E
- Country: Georgia
- Region: Tbilisi
- District: Samgori District
- Microdistrict (Uban): No 19 "Orkhevi, Airport"
- Founded: 1948
- Named for: Orkhevi river

Area.
  - Total: 1.477 km^{2} (0.570 sq mi)
- Elevation: 513.5 m (1,685 ft)
- Demonym: Orkhevian(s)
- Time zone: UTC+4 (Georgia Time)
- Postal code: 0190

Orkhevi (Georgian: ორხევი, pronounced [ɔrxɛvi]; formally Orkhevi Settlement, Georgian: ორხევის დასახლება, pronounced [ɔrxɛvis dasaxlɛba]) is a settlement (dasakhleba) and suburb in the eastern part of Tbilisi, within the Samgori District. It stands on the left bank of the Mtkvari River, between the settlements of Samgori-II and Zemo (Upper) Alekseevka. The well-planned workers' settlement was established in the mid-20th century to house the builders and engineers of the Samgorvodstroy trust, responsible for constructing the Tbilisi Reservoir and the Samgori irrigation system. Over time, it has transformed from a Soviet-era industrial hub into a residential area with mixed-use development.

The area of the settlement was inhabited as far back as the Late Bronze Age (13th–11th centuries BCE), as evidenced by numerous archaeological findings. The modern history of Orkhevi began in 1948 with the establishment of a key industrial and logistical base for the Samgorvodstroy trust. The settlement was rapidly developed with residential buildings and its own social infrastructure.

From the 1960s to the 1980s, Orkhevi's industrial profile expanded significantly with the construction of large enterprises, including a strategically important reinforced concrete plant for the Tbilisi Metro and a branch of a building materials factory, among other industries. Archival sources from this period provide a detailed look into the life of the settlement, documenting both official achievements and the daily challenges faced by its residents.

The dissolution of the Soviet Union marked a new chapter in Orkhevi's history, characterized by the privatization of Soviet enterprises, a rise in crime—notably the widely publicized case of the "Orkhevi maniac"—and a simultaneous spiritual revival, symbolized by the construction of the Church of St. Nino. In the 21st century, the settlement has faced modern challenges, including social protests, environmental issues, and conflicts over illegal construction. At the same time, a period of active urban improvement has begun, with road renovations, rehabilitation of social facilities, and the creation of new recreational areas.

== Etymology ==
The name "Orkhevi" is believed to originate from the eponymous river and is formed by combining two Georgian words: ori khevi (Georgian: ორი ხევი), which means "two ravines" or "the confluence of two ravines". Historically, this area, including the neighboring settlements, was known as Karisebi (Georgian: ქარისები), which translates to "windy places".

The toponym is not unique in Georgia. Besides the well-known village of Orkhevi in Tianeti Municipality, the name also appears in 20th-century literary and journalistic sources. These mention other places named Orkhevi, such as a location in the Khoni district of Imereti referenced in Konstantine Lortkipanidze's novel The Dawn of Kolkhida, and a kolkhoz in the Gurjaani district of Kakheti mentioned in a 1958 literary review.

== Archaeology ==
The territory on which the modern settlement stands has an ancient history. In the Orkhevi field, at the confluence of the Orkhevi and Kura rivers, burials from the Late Bronze Age (13th–11th centuries BCE) were discovered. During archaeological excavations, more than 80 artifacts were found, including various ceramics (jugs, pots, bowls), bronze weapons (daggers, axes, spearheads, and arrowheads), as well as ornaments made of bronze, bone, and carnelian. These findings indicate that the area was densely populated and had a developed economy based on agriculture and animal husbandry over three thousand years ago.

== History ==
=== Prehistory of the area (until 1948) ===
Before the founding of the modern workers' settlement, "Orkhevi" referred to a geographical area and presumably a railway station. The area was first mentioned in the Soviet period in the context of the Sovietization of Georgia in February 1921, when units of the 11th Red Army moved towards Orkhevi station as part of the offensive on Tiflis.

In the post-war years, with the start of the Samgori irrigation system project, the area became a site of active development. The first preparatory work began in 1946. In October of that year, the press reported on the start of construction of workers' settlements in the area of the future Tbilisi reservoir. Later, in a letter from the settlement's residents in 1970, it was claimed that the first temporary structures were built as early as 1946.

By the end of 1946, Orkhevi was already a recognized landmark on the administrative map of the capital. When forming the electoral districts of Tbilisi in December 1946, it was mentioned as a boundary point of the Navtlughi electoral district, whose border ran "from Navtlughi station to Orkhevi". Thus, by the beginning of 1948, Orkhevi was a known area with preparations for large-scale construction underway, but not yet a fully-fledged settlement with an industrial base.

=== Establishment of the industrial base (1948) ===
The full-scale industrial development of the area, already known as Orkhevi, began in 1948 when this territory was chosen as a key industrial and logistics base for the "Samgorvodstroy" trust, which was leading the construction of the Samgori irrigation system.

Development proceeded at a rapid pace. In March 1948, the head of the trust, V. Gaganidze, announced the creation of a material supply base in Orkhevi, including central mechanical workshops, a garage, and a sawmill. By April of the same year, the auto repair shops, garage, and mechanical workshops had been built. By July, the central mechanical workshop was being completed, equipped with "first-class machines" for repairing construction equipment and manufacturing parts. At the same time, a power line was being extended to the industrial zone to supply the workshop, the sawmill, and the material and cement warehouses.

In addition to industrial development, Orkhevi became the starting point for the transport infrastructure of the entire project. It was from the Kakheti highway in the Orkhevi area that construction began of a separate operational road, which ran along the entire route of the main canal and connected all its sections.

=== Formation of the workers' settlement (1949–1950s) ===
After the creation of the industrial base, active housing construction began. In October 1949, the newspaper Komunisti reported: "In Orkhevi, several residential houses and a canteen are already ready... then Orkhevi will already be a settlement (daba)".

By the end of 1950, Orkhevi, part of the Gareubani district of Tbilisi, had turned into a well-equipped workers' town for the builders of the Samgori irrigation system. Over two years, 26 residential houses, a kindergarten, a nursery, an outpatient clinic, a barbershop, a bathhouse, a canteen, and a shop were built. Decorative trees were planted along the straight streets, and the settlement was equipped with its own radio communication center, water supply, and power station. By this time, the construction of a club for 300 people and a post office building was near complete. Housing construction continued: by December of the same year, six additional houses were built for drivers and mechanics, and medical stations with dental offices were opened.

The social and cultural life of the settlement also developed rapidly. In 1951, a public library was opened. (now the Terenti Graneli Library) and a new club, where concerts were held, including tours by artists from the Lithuanian Soviet Socialist Republic. The settlement took pride in its outstanding workers, among whom were roofer Giorgi Peshkhelashvili, drivers Nadezhda Klyshina and Ivan Arutyunov, and excavator operators Ivan Timchenko (Note: The source contains an error—according to the recollections of old-timers, the newspaper mistakenly named him Georgiy Timchenko at the time.) and Stepan Fadeev, sawyer Mikhail Meladze, and carpenter Georgy Ninoshvili

Simultaneously, the administrative and political establishment of Orkhevi was taking place. On January 25, 1950, the Orkhevi electoral precinct was established, and by 1954, a primary party organization was already active here. To provide the construction project with qualified workers, courses for the training and advanced training of construction personnel were organized.

Despite the active development, the quality of life and utility services was not always high. In 1952, residents complained about the meager assortment in the store and were forced to travel to Tbilisi for essential goods.

=== Administrative reforms and industrial growth (1960s–1980s) ===
In the 1960s, the settlement underwent significant administrative transformations and faced domestic problems typical of rapidly growing workers' settlements. In April 1962, as part of a reform, the Samgori district was separated from the administrative jurisdiction of Tbilisi. Simultaneously, the "settlement of the Samgori Irrigation System Administration" was officially merged with the village of Orkhevi, and the new entity was named the Samgori settlement. Despite the official renaming, the historical name Orkhevi remained firmly in everyday use, as evidenced by numerous letters from residents to newspapers of the time.

The social life of the settlement during this period was vividly captured in the pages of the newspaper Zarya Vostoka. In December 1962, two letters were published that reflected the contrasts of daily life. On December 7, a group of 15 residents, including public inspector T. Semikhova, published a collective letter complaining about the work of the grocery store (manager G. Bayramov), the meat and vegetable stall (manager S. Lazarishvili), and the restaurant (manager N. Jalalov). The residents reported inflated prices for pastry, the sale of meat at a single price without differentiation by grade, and the illegal sale of alcohol at a soft drink kiosk. Notably, a day later, on December 8, another letter appeared in the same newspaper, in which residents, including Anna Alekseevna Osipova, G. Timchenko, and R. Yakovenko, expressed heartfelt gratitude to the children's doctor of the local polyclinic, Edita Georgievna Asatiani, noting that her "kind smile and kind words are the best medicine for the sick". By 1970, almost a quarter of a century after its founding, living conditions had worsened: in a collective letter, 40 residents complained about the extreme dilapidation of the "temporary structures built in 1946", frequent interruptions in the supply of drinking water, and an almost complete lack of electricity.

By the 1970s, Orkhevi was incorporated into the Zavodskoy District (Georgian: საქარხნო რაიონი, lit. 'Factory District') of Tbilisi, and the authorities began to pay attention to its improvement, particularly road lighting. During this period, Orkhevi's industrial profile, initially focused on construction, began to actively diversify. In addition to the existing "Orkhevi livestock sovkhoz", the construction of a number of new industrial facilities began in the settlement.

A key enterprise was the new "reinforced concrete structures plant (ZhBK)", built in the early 1980s by "Tbiltonnelstroy" under the leadership of Hero of Socialist Labour Alexander Datashvili. This enterprise, on a field that, according to a contemporary, "looked like a runway", and past which a road ran, bordered by the "pink foam of blossoming almond trees" from the gardens of the Alekseevka settlement, was of strategic importance. It was critical for supplying the construction sites of the Tbilisi Metro, which, in the words of a journalist, were "starving", experiencing a severe shortage of structures, and awaited the plant's launch like "manna from heaven". In February 1982, the plant, which included a concrete mixing unit and a central warehouse for 1,100 tons of cement, produced its first products. Its design capacity was 20,000m³ of precast reinforced concrete and 50,000m³ of ready-mix concrete per year. In connection with its launch, the old ZhBK plant on Eliava Street in Tbilisi was closed down in 1983.

In the mid-1980s, a branch of the "Tbilisi Building Materials Combine" was opened in Orkhevi with a new tool workshop. To staff it, the management organized a "labor landing party" (a special team of experienced workers) from the main enterprise, led by engineer Semyon Semiletov, so that the traditions of the combine, as it was said, were "already in their blood". By 1988, the combine had established the production of plumbing fixtures and cladding panels from marble and polymer waste, using equipment from the West German firm "ADM" and the Dutch "Stork".

The settlement's industrial infrastructure also included:

- Organic Fertilizer Plant — was under construction in 1962, for which a special bridge-aqueduct with a pipeline was built across the Kura River.
- Production yards for reinforced concrete troughs for irrigation systems (operating in 1963).
- A textile and haberdashery combine (under construction in 1971).
- New buildings for the Kalinin Foundry Equipment Plant (scheduled for completion in 1989).
- Souvenir production by the "Solani" association (planned in 1985), which was to produce items in a national style: bags, tobacco pouches, scarves, and headwear.

To provide the growing industry with personnel, the "Gruzglavmontazhspetsstroy" training center was in operation at 1 Akhvlediani Street by 1982. It trained gas and electric welders, plumbers, and fitters, providing students with a dormitory and a scholarship of 75 rubles per month for a training period of three to six months. In 1987, the creation of a centralized repair base in Orkhevi for the industrial needs of the entire republic was discussed.

=== Post-Soviet period and contemporary period ===
With the collapse of the Soviet Union and the transition to a market economy, Orkhevi, like all of Georgia, entered an era of radical change. This period was characterized by sharp contrasts: the emergence of private enterprise against a backdrop of economic instability, a spiritual revival amidst rising crime, and the gradual integration into the country's new social and defense structures.

==== 1990s: Transitional economy ====
In the 1990s, private companies began to form on the basis of Soviet industrial facilities. A striking example of adaptation to the new conditions was JSC "Vaziani". Its general director, David Akhvlediani, who was educated in Moscow specializing in foreign trade, returned to Georgia during difficult years and took charge of the enterprise. By 1998, Vaziani was producing the popular "Tsarskoe" champagne but, like many industries of that time, faced high taxation and a lack of sales markets, which hindered the production of cognac and forced it to operate at partial capacity.

The economic situation of that time was reflected in the details. In 1996, the U.S. Embassy held a closed auction in Orkhevi, on the site of the dairy, selling scarce goods: generators, washing machines, dryers, and building materials, which indicated the need of the population and organizations for basic infrastructure. However, not all new enterprises maintained high standards: in the same year, the firm "Giorgi-94" from Orkhevi was mentioned in the press in connection with the production of low-quality wine.

In the second half of the decade, large-scale privatization through a voucher system began. Major industrial enterprises of the settlement were put up for auction with a nominal share value of one dollar: JSC "Polymer Product", on 4.3 hectares of land, and the "Khalibi" repair and mechanical plant.

==== Spiritual life, security, and development in the 2000s ====
Against the backdrop of socio-economic difficulties, a spiritual revival began in the settlement. A landmark event was the construction of a new Orthodox church in honor of Saint Nino.

At the same time, Orkhevi acquired new importance in the country's defense system. In 2007, as part of military cooperation with Turkey, a repair point for the logistics battalion in the settlement was renovated and equipped.

===== The case of the "Orkhevi Maniac" and crime chronicle =====
In the 2000s, the settlement gained notoriety due to a series of brutal murders and acts of cannibalism committed by a local resident, Mikhail Azaladze. He was nicknamed the "Orkhevi maniac" by law enforcement agencies and was sentenced to life imprisonment. The crimes, committed at 1 Chantladze Street in Orkhevi, drew the attention of the entire country to the settlement.

The crime chronicle of that period also reporte on other incidents. In March 2000, a resident of Shakhty, Russia, was detained in Orkhevi for smuggling and attempting to sell 78.2 grams of opium. Residents of the settlement themselves became victims of the generally unstable situation: in the same month, an attack in the center of Tbilisi, near the Tbilisi Funicular, on an Orkhevi resident, Giorgi Tskhovrebashvili, was reported.

==== Contemporary period ====
In the 21st century, Orkhevi continues to develop as an integral part of Tbilisi. The area is mentioned in modern scientific research; in particular, in 2011, samples of loam from the Orkhevi district were used for geotechnical tests. In the political life of the capital, the settlement is part of one of the majoritarian districts of the Samgori district, whose representatives are elected to the city Sakrebulo.

During this period, the authorities also addressed the problem of moving residents from dilapidated housing. In January 2011, Orkhevi became the site of the forced eviction of dozens of internally displaced (IDP) families who lived in one of the former administrative buildings of the settlement. On January 20, 2011, with the participation of the police, their eviction was carried out. According to news footage from the "Liberali" TV channel, among those evicted were refugees affected by the 2008 war. In interviews, residents expressed their despair, stating that they were being transported "like cattle" (Georgian: როგორც საქონელი), and expressed uncertainty about their future homes. Some families were moved to cottages in Gori; however, according to one resident, the compensation did not cover all members of his large family, and some people were left without a specific place to live. The eviction involved loading personal belongings, including furniture and icons, onto military and civilian trucks. (Note: The video is a report by the 'Liberali' TV channel, uploaded to a hosting service by a private individual. The date of the event (January 20) is indicated in the credits; the year (2011) is inferred from the video's upload date.)

Special attention was drawn to the dilapidated building of the former "Turist" auto base at 4/2 Chantladze Street, where 10 families of internally displaced persons (IDPs) and six socially vulnerable families had been living since 1998. According to a report by the Tavisupali Zona TV channel on February 7, 2016, they had been living here for 10 to 15 years in makeshift structures without sewage, gas, or proper water supply. Residents complained about the complete inaction of the authorities, including Guliko Zumbadze (a Sakrebulo deputy) and Mamuka Chokuri (former head of the Samgori district), who, they claimed, only made promises during election periods but did not solve their main problem—the legalization of their housing. In April 2016, after numerous appeals, a decision was made to conduct a second technical examination of the building. By June of the same year, an agreement was reached to provide new housing for 11 IDP families through the relevant ministry, as well as to find alternative housing for 9 families who did not have IDP status. The issue of final resettlement remained on the agenda of the Sakrebulo's Human Rights and Civil Integration Commission in 2017.

In July 2016, the settlement became the scene of a social protest. Residents held a rally demanding the restoration of the former Polyclinic No. 22, the only medical facility in Orkhevi. It had been closed back in 2011 by merging with Polyclinic No. 16 in Lilo, and at the time of the protest, its building was already being demolished. The rally, initiated by Bezhan Gunava, a representative of the opposition "Alliance of Patriots" party, escalated into clashes with employees of the office of the district's majoritarian deputy, Guliko Zumbadze.

==== Establishment of municipal housing and the 2015 conflict ====
In 2015, the social housing complex in Orkhevi, while still under construction, became the subject of a social conflict. The issue arose from the authorities' plan to resettle 117 socially vulnerable families from a former military hospital in the Isani district. The purpose was to vacate the building for its subsequent renovation and allocation to 160 internally displaced families. Some of the evicted families were to be housed in the new municipal housing in Orkhevi, which was designed for 72 families.

The process sparked protests from the families facing resettlement and drew critical assessment from the human rights organization Human Rights Education and Monitoring Center (EMC, later the Social Justice Center). In a statement on August 12, 2015, EMC highlighted systemic flaws in the resettlement plan:

- Lack of transparent criteria: It was unclear on what basis 72 of the 117 families would be selected to receive apartments in Orkhevi, which, according to the organization, created a risk of unfair distribution.
- Inadequacy of the proposed housing: According to the families, the apartments in Orkhevi were too small for large families and lacked basic living amenities.
- Instability of alternatives: Families not selected for the Orkhevi housing were offered only a temporary rent subsidy until the end of the budget year, which did not constitute a long-term solution.
- Violation of international standards: The human rights advocates emphasized that the process violated Georgia's obligations regarding the right to adequate housing, as eviction is permissible only as a last resort.

EMC demanded an immediate halt to the eviction process, the development of objective criteria for assessing the needs of homeless families, and the provision of stable, long-term housing solutions with the direct involvement of the families themselves.

===== Demolition of illegal buildings (2022) =====
In January 2022, Orkhevi came under public scrutiny following the demolition of several residential structures. By order of the municipal inspectorate of the Tbilisi City Hall, buildings that the authorities described as illegal constructions on state land were dismantled.

The event sparked a mixed reaction. Tbilisi Mayor Kakha Kaladze stated that the demolition was carried out after repeated warnings and that the city authorities would not tolerate unauthorized land seizure. In turn, the human rights organization "Social Justice Center" (SJC) issued a sharp critique. The organization described the City Hall's actions as "another repressive measure" against the homeless and part of a systemic policy, rather than an isolated incident. It particularly emphasized that the demolition, carried out during the winter and amid the COVID-19 pandemic without offering alternative housing, put people "at risk of being left on the street, in destitution, and of physical destruction." The human rights defenders pointed to a systemic flaw in the legislation, which, by ignoring international standards, does not recognize the forced demolition of housing as a form of eviction, thereby depriving the affected individuals of legal protection. In this context, SJC put forward specific demands:

- to the Tbilisi City Hall — to immediately halt the demolition and provide the affected individuals with adequate housing;
- to the Ministry of Internally Displaced Persons from the Occupied Territories, Labour, Health and Social Affairs — to develop a national housing strategy;
- to the Government and Parliament of Georgia — to legally recognize forced removal during demolition as a form of eviction and to fully harmonize national legislation with international human rights standards.

===== Conflict over social housing (2023–2025) =====
In late 2023, the safety of a social housing building in Orkhevi became a critical issue. Built in 1967 as a school food factory, this had been repurposed for social housing in 2017. By 2022, it housed 260 people. For years, residents, including children and people with disabilities, had complained about poor conditions such as dampness, overcrowding, and deteriorating walls and ceilings.

In December 2023, the human rights organization "Social Justice Center" (SJC) published the findings of an engineering study commissioned by the Samgori district administration. The report identified critical structural flaws:

- Seismic non-compliance: The building did not meet modern standards for an 8-point seismic zone.
- Poor structural integrity: The report noted low-quality construction, including the use of prohibited silicate bricks and poorly concreted frame joints.
- Risk of collapse: Corrosion on metal support elements created a danger of "instantaneous collapse".
- Economically unviable repairs: The cost of necessary reinforcement work was estimated to cost well over half the building's total value.

The experts concluded that the building was unsafe for habitation without major structural reinforcement, which would require the evacuation of all residents. SJC called on the Tbilisi City Hall to immediately provide the residents with safe and dignified alternative housing.

The situation escalated in May 2025, by which time about 25 of the original 75 families remained in the dilapidated building. The Tbilisi City Hall offered the residents a resettlement plan: first, temporary accommodation in rented apartments paid for by the city, and then the provision of permanent housing elsewhere.

However, the residents rejected this offer. Their distrust stemmed from a lack of legal guarantees: they feared that after eviction, they would remain in temporary housing indefinitely. The residents' main demand was to receive an official document guaranteeing them ownership of specific apartments and a personal meeting with Mayor Kakha Kaladze. "A meeting only and exclusively with Kakha Kaladze. He must understand the wishes of these people and take them into account," stated one of the residents.

The situation escalated sharply when the authorities cut off the electricity to the building to expedite the eviction. The residents viewed this as a pressure tactic. In response, they restored the electricity themselves and announced their intention to start an indefinite, round-the-clock protest at the city hall building. "We have no way back", declared one of the men. A young mother with a nine-month-old child in her arms confirmed their resolve: "If necessary, we will stay in front of the city hall all night."

==== Military-logistics hub in Orkhevi ====
In the post-Soviet period, Orkhevi acquired significant strategic importance as the location of a key facility of the Defense Forces of Georgia. The transport (automotive) base of the Logistics Command (Georgian: თავდაცვის ძალების ლოგისტიკური უზრუნველყოფის სარდლობის სატრანსპორტო/საავტომობილო ბაზა) is located here, serving as a central hub for the reception, distribution, maintenance, and modernization of military equipment.

The base is a primary platform for international military cooperation, particularly with Turkey, under a long-standing "Agreement on Military-Financial Cooperation." It regularly hosts official ceremonies for the transfer of military aid, such as logistics vehicles, maintenance trucks, and tractors. These high-profile events are typically attended by top officials including the Minister of Defense, the Turkish Ambassador, and high-ranking commanders of the Georgian Defense Forces.

The facility is also central to the Georgian army's own modernization and reform initiatives. For example, a major program under Minister Irakli Garibashvili to replace the army's vehicle fleet with modern Toyota Hilux pickups and Toyota Land Cruiser SUVs was launched from the base. It has also served as a venue for significant policy announcements, such as the introduction of an improved health insurance package for all military personnel, and is subject to regular infrastructure inspections by senior defense leadership.

Beyond its logistical role, the base has served various civic and memorial functions. Over the years, it has been home to specific units, including the 12th Battalion of the 1st Light Infantry Brigade and the Automobile Battalion. The site has hosted a polling station during presidential elections and, in a notable 2015 event, soldiers of the 12th Battalion, with Deputy Minister of Defense Anna Dolidze in attendance, planted 50 cypress trees on the base in memory of their comrades who died in battle.

== Geography ==
=== Engineering and geological features ===
Since the Soviet era, the territory of Orkhevi and its surroundings has been known for its deposits of construction materials, particularly gypsum (Georgian: გაჯი). The Orkhevi settlement is in the eastern part of Tbilisi, the territory of the Samgori irrigation system. The area is characterized by the presence of loams, which was confirmed in a 2011 paper on hydromelioration. The study used soil samples taken directly from the Orkhevi area.

The main physical and mechanical properties of the local loam were identified as follows:

- Plasticity index: 15.5
- Initial hydraulic conductivity (K_{f}): 2.63×10⁻³ cm/sec
- pH of aqueous extract: 7.5
- Dry bulk density in natural state: 1.48 g/cm³

==== Results of filtration tests ====
The study investigated the possibility of reducing the water permeability of local loams by treating them with surfactants (surface-active agents)—in this case, still bottoms from caprolactam production. The goal was to assess how effectively such treatment could seal the pores in the soil, an important factor for hydraulic and irrigation construction.

The results showed that after treatment with surfactants, the loam's water permeability decreased sharply. At a hydraulic gradient (the ratio of pressure drop to filtration path length) of up to 2.0, water filtration through the samples completely stopped. Even when the gradient was significantly increased to 10.0, the permeability coefficient remained very low (around 1.04×10⁻⁵ cm/sec), indicating the formation of a stable and virtually waterproof structure in the soil. These findings confirm that Orkhevi's loams have properties that allow for the effective reduction of their filtration characteristics, a key geographical and engineering—geological feature of the area.

=== Ecology ===
The ecological situation in the settlement, particularly concerning the operation of industrial enterprises, has repeatedly been a source of social protests and public concern.

==== Industrial pollution and protests ====
In September 2014, the operation of the "Georgian Metal" ferroalloy plant, just 100–150 meters from Public School No. 156, became a significant issue. Residents and parents of students held protests, demanding a halt to production due to heavy smoke and the lack of modern filters at the plant. They argued that the harmful emissions posed a direct threat to the health of nearly 700 schoolchildren and the entire local population. The plant's management acknowledged "minor shortcomings" and promised to install filters but refused to suspend operations. Ecologist Nino Chkhobadze noted that the legislation at the time did not require an environmental impact assessment for such facilities, which allowed the plant to be built near the school. The Ministry of Environmental Protection reported that the plant had already been fined twice for violations and was under monitoring.

In August 2016, residents protested again against severe air pollution, which they attributed to the operation of factories, particularly the "Chiaturmanganese Georgia" plant. According to a report by TV channel Obieqtivi, residents complained that the factories operated in violation of technical standards, especially at night, causing heavy smoke. They linked this to an increase in allergic, cardiovascular, and cancerous diseases in the settlement. In response to the complaints, the Ministry of Environmental Protection stated that its inspectors had conducted a preliminary review and planned a full inspection of the enterprises for compliance with environmental regulations.

In April 2017, following complaints from residents about an unpleasant odor and sewage contamination, allegedly linked to the activities of the food processing company Foodmart, meetings were held with municipal authorities. As a result, the company took steps to address the issue, including installing special exhaust filters.

==== Proximity to the oil depot ====
Another acute environmental and social problem was the close proximity of residential buildings to the SOCAR Georgia Petroleum oil depot. In a Studio Monitor report from January 31, 2018, Orkhevi residents described their situation as "living on a bomb", complaining about constant noise, a strong smell of petroleum products, and the danger from railway tankers passing just meters from their homes. According to the investigation, the permit for the construction of the 20,000-ton oil depot was issued in 2009, after the repeal of sanitary norms that had regulated the safe distance between industrial and residential facilities. As a result, one residential building was only 30 meters from the storage tanks. In a comment for the report, ecologist Manana Kochoradze called such legislation a "global exception". The report also noted that under the Georgia–European Union Association Agreement, Georgia had committed to adopting a new Environmental Code, harmonized with European directives, by September 2017. However, at the time of the report (January 2018), this deadline had already been missed.

==== Product Quality and Safety Control ====
In addition to industrial air pollution, the safety of utility services and consumer goods has also become a focus of government attention. Official reports from the National Food Agency for 2019–2025 reflect the results of monitoring both drinking water and food products.

As part of the control over municipal infrastructure, the 2019 report documented the sampling of drinking water from the distribution network of Georgian Water and Power at 8 Kakabadze 1st Lane, Orkhevi. According to the analysis conducted at the laboratory of the G. Natadze Scientific Research Institute of Sanitation, Hygiene, and Medical Ecology, no violations of quality standards were found.

State monitoring regularly covers the products of food enterprises based in the settlement and shows a mixed picture of their activities.

Chronology of monitoring results:

- 2019: Non-dairy (vegetable) fats were found in sour cream produced by Respublika LLC, which constitutes adulteration. The company was fined 600 GEL. In the same year, samples of butter and cheese from the same producer, taken from Tbilisi kindergarten No. 65, showed no violations.
- 2020: Widespread violations were recorded at Respublika LLC. Laboratory tests showed that the proportion of non-dairy fats reached 93.1% in Ranina butter and 84.8% in Malko milk. For a repeated violation of labeling rules within a year, the company was fined 600 GEL and ordered to withdraw the products from the market.
- 2021: This year was marked by the most serious violations. At the supplier Fruit Logistics LLC, several batches of watermelons and melons were found to greatly exceed the permissible norm for nitrates. In one watermelon sample, the nitrate content was 400 mg/kg against a norm of 60 mg/kg (a 6.6-fold excess). In melons, the figure reached 380 mg/kg against a norm of 90 mg/kg (a 4.2-fold excess). All hazardous products were removed from sale. In the same year, Respublika LLC was again found to have violations in its cottage cheese and sour cream, and the information was transferred to the Investigative Service of the Ministry of Finance. Meanwhile, inspections of products from Dugladze Wine Company and Dako Trade LLC revealed no violations this year.
- 2022: Nitrates were again found in watermelons from Fruit Logistics LLC (117 mg/kg against a norm of 60 mg/kg), leading to the withdrawal of the batch. Unlike in previous years, no violations were recorded in the products of Respublika LLC. No violations were found at Dugladze Wine Company, Dako Trade LLC, or Foodservice LLC either.
- 2023: Respublika LLC was again caught for adulteration—85% non-dairy fats were found in Malko butter. The company was fined. Inspections of products from Dugladze Wine Company and Foodservice LLC revealed no violations this year.

In the reports for all quarters of 2024 and the first quarter of 2025, no violations were recorded for companies based in Orkhevi. Specifically, inspections confirmed that the products of Dugladze Wine Company, Respublika LLC, Agroflora LLC, and Dako Trade LLC met the standards.

== Administrative status ==
The Orkhevi settlement is administratively part of the Samgori District. Throughout its history, the settlement has changed its administrative affiliation several times:

- District of the 26 Commissars and Kalininsky District (late 1940s – early 1950s): Initially, in 1946, the Orkhevi area was within the boundaries of the Navtlughi electoral district, which was part of the District of the 26 Commissars. By January 1950, with the establishment of the Orkhevi electoral precinct, the settlement was already listed as part of the Kalininsky District of Tbilisi.
- Gareubani District (early 1950s): Soon after, the administrative division changed again. By the end of 1950, the Orkhevi settlement was mentioned as an important part of the Gareubani District of Tbilisi, where housing and social construction was underway.
- Samgori District (from 1962): In April 1962, the Samgori District was formed, and removed from the administrative oversight of Tbilisi. The center of this new district became the Samgori settlement, created by merging Orkhevi with the neighboring settlement of the Samgori Irrigation System Administration.
- Gardabani District (late 1960s – early 1970s): A few years later, as indicated in a letter from residents published in January 1970, the Orkhevi settlement was part of the Gardabani District.
- Zavodskoy District (1970s–1980s): In the early 1970s, Orkhevi was again incorporated within Tbilisi and became part of the Zavodskoy District (Georgian: საქარხნო რაიონი). Within this district, Orkhevi was part of the Aeroportovsky electoral district No. 65 (1975, center – airport directorate), the Meliorators' electoral district No. 84 (1984, center – School No. 156), and the Orkhevsky electoral district No. 48 (1989, center – School No. 156).
- Isani-Samgori District (1990s–2000s): Following the dissolution of the Soviet Union and the administrative reforms of the 1990s, Orkhevi became part of the newly formed Isani-Samgori District (Georgian: ისანი-სამგორის რაიონი). The existence of this unified district is documented in authoritative geographical reference books published in 2000 and 2003. In October 2009, on the initiative of Tbilisi Mayor Gigi Ugulava, a new territorial unit, Orkhevi, Airport (Georgian: ორხევი, აეროპორტი), was created within this district, marking the first step toward the modern administrative structure.
- Samgori District (modern period): Currently, after the post-Soviet administrative reforms, Orkhevi is once again part of the Samgori District of Tbilisi. According to a 2014 municipal decree, Orkhevi, along with the territory of the Airport settlement and other areas, forms the 19th microdistrict (uban) of the district, named Orkhevi, Airport. The local administration for this unit is at 6 Giorgi Mukhadze Street. To the north, it borders the settlements of Tetrikhevi and Tetrikhevhesi. In the 2017 local elections, Giorgi Tkemaladze was nominated by the ruling Georgian Dream party as a Sakrebulo deputy for the majoritarian district that includes Orkhevi, the Lilo settlement, and the airport.

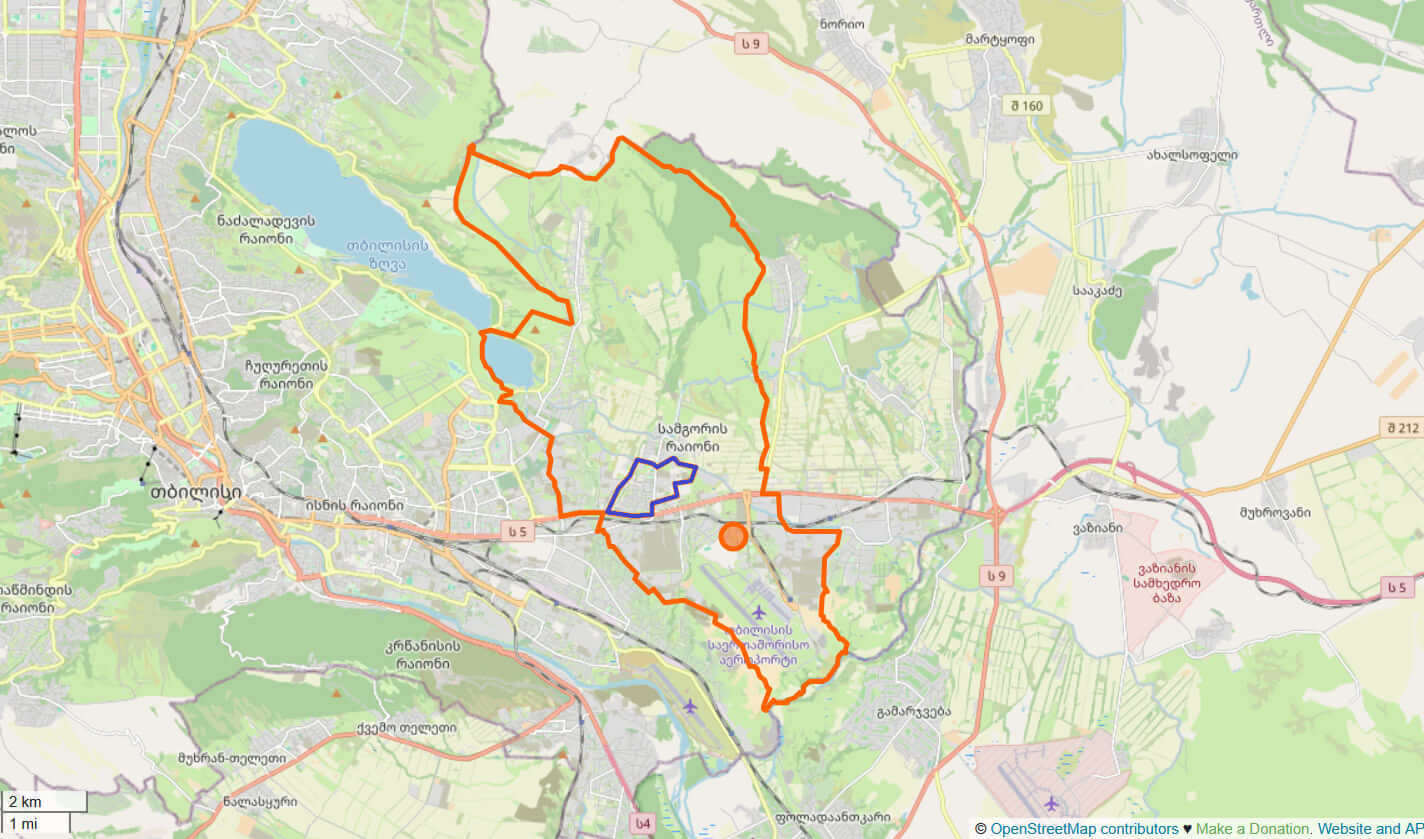
Borders of administrative uban No. 19 "Orkhevi, Airport" (orange) and the Orkhevi settlement (blue) within it.

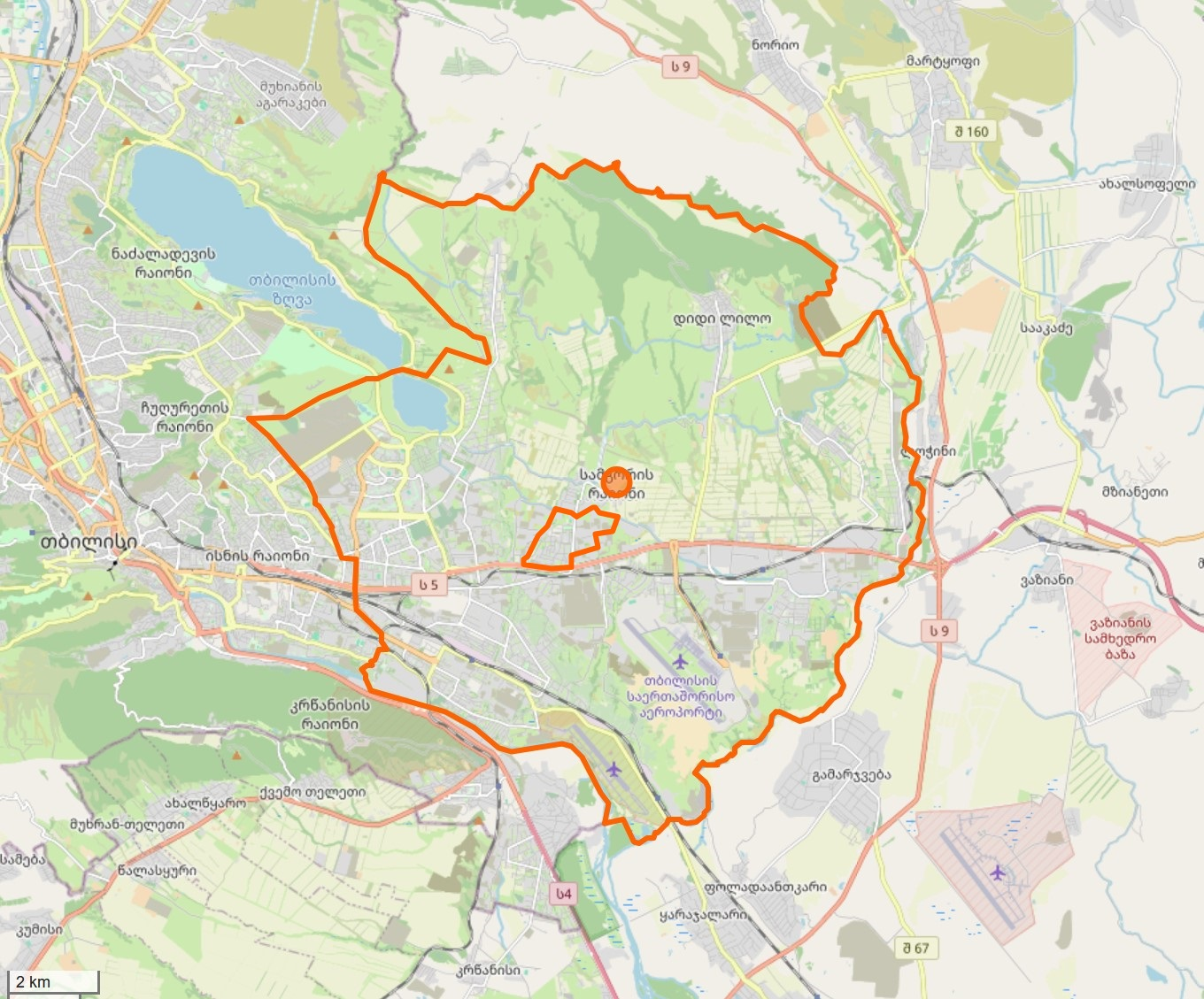
Orkhevi as part of the Samgori District.

Main streets:

- Tengiz Chantladze Street — until 2001, it was named Elene Akhvlediani Street.
- Giorgi Mukhadze Street
- Soso (Koba) Abzianidze Street
- Alexandre Kartvelishvili Street
- Niko Pirosmani Street
- Shalva Amiranashvili Street
- David Kakabadze Street
- Vazhi Banetishvili Street
- Ioane Petritsi Street
- Alexandre Tsutsunava Street
- Ivane Gokieli Street
- Soso Gviniashvili Street
- Sergei Yesenin Street
- Giorgi Saakadze Street

== Infrastructure ==
The settlement's infrastructure, established during the Soviet period, includes educational, industrial, commercial, cultural, and recreational facilities. Many of these ceased to exist or were transformed after the dissolution of the Soviet Union, while new ones emerged in their place and alongside them.

In the 1950s, an outpatient clinic, a polyclinic, dental offices, a bathhouse, a post office, a club, a library, a restaurant, and several shops were built in the settlement. Despite active development, the quality of utility services was not always high: in 1962, residents complained about the poor condition of the shops and the restaurant. In 1970, residents complained about the dilapidated state of temporary housing built in 1946, frequent interruptions in the supply of drinking water, and a near-total lack of electricity, which deprived them of the ability to use radios and televisions.

As of 2005, the settlement, along with several other districts on the outskirts of Tbilisi, was not fully connected to the central sewer system, and wastewater was partially discharged into nearby ravines.

Currently, Orkhevi is primarily a residential microdistrict with Soviet-era two- to five-story buildings in the north and private houses with plots of land in the south.

=== Government institutions ===
Government institutions

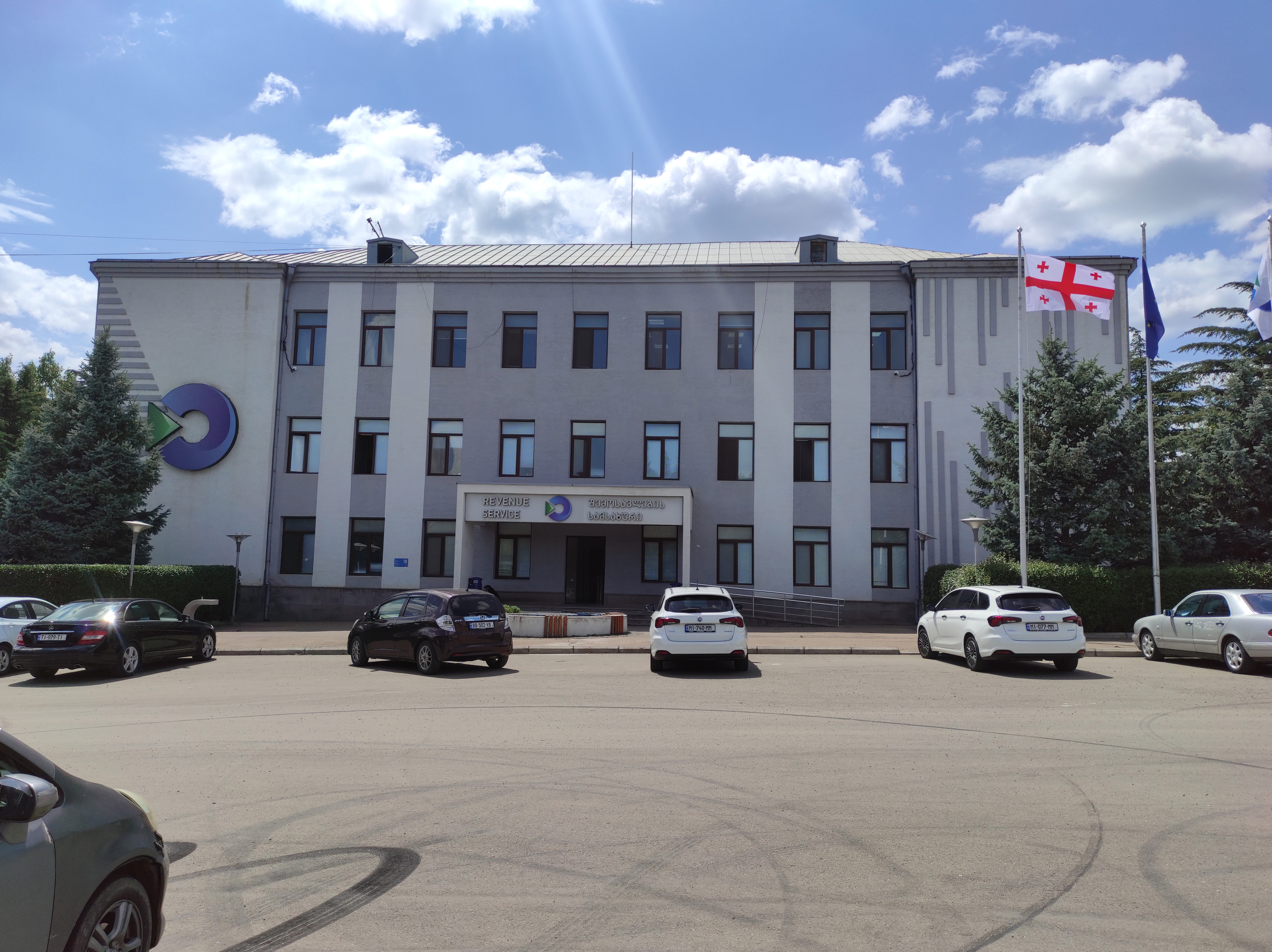
The main building of the Non-Tariff Control Department of the Revenue Service of Georgia.

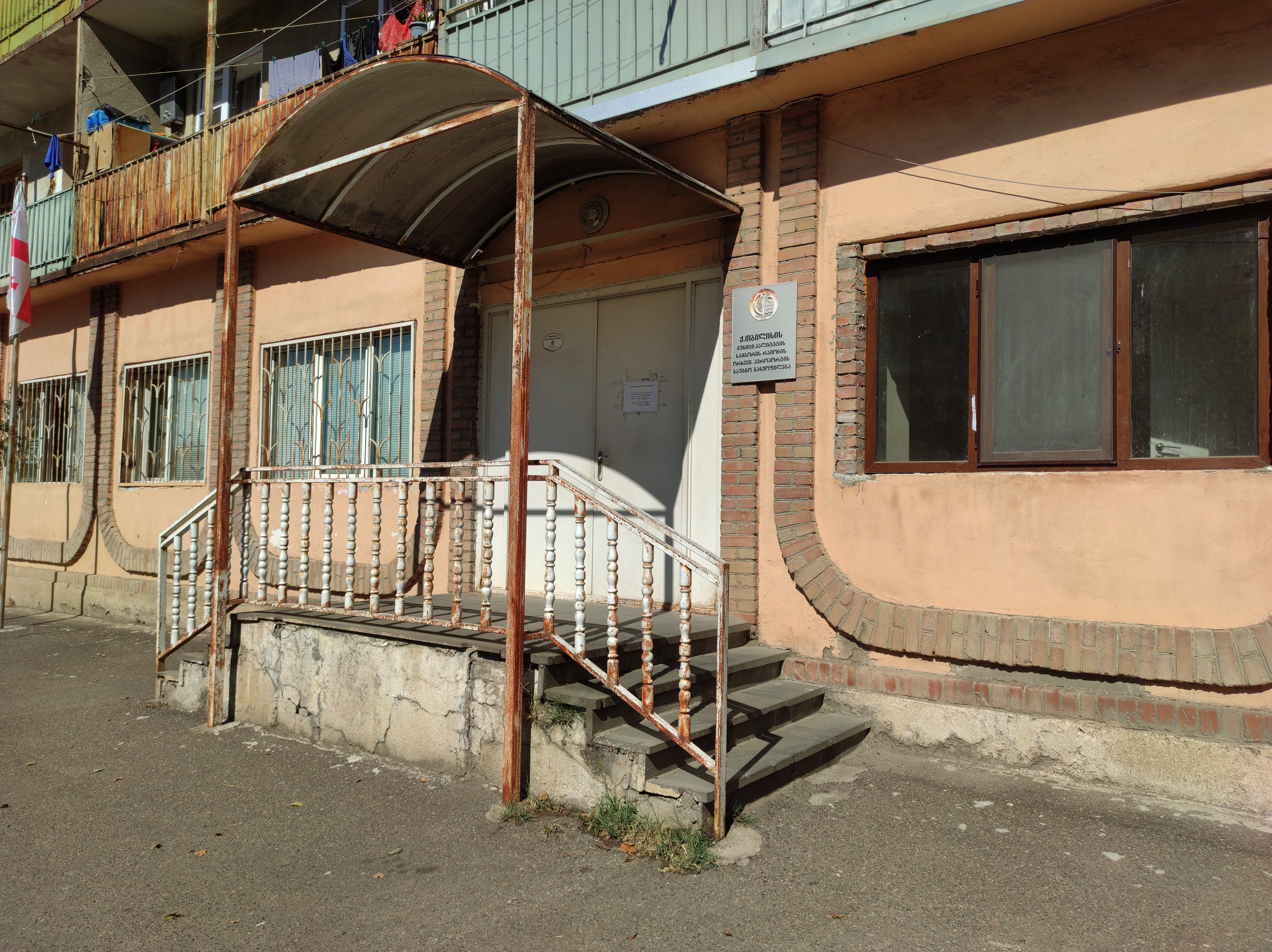
Entrance to the "Orkhevi, Airport" Microdistrict Office of the Samgori District Administration.

- Non-Tariff Control Department of the Revenue Service of Georgia — at 10 Koba Abzianidze Street / 9 Giorgi Mukhadze Street, this is a unit of the Customs Department of the Revenue Service of the Ministry of Finance of Georgia. This department, along with other service centers and customs clearance zones throughout the country, issues certificates of origin for goods required for export operations.
- Samgori District Administration, Orkhevi, Airport Office — at 6 Giorgi Mukhadze Street. This is a local government body that serves the microdistrict administrative unit (uban) of the same name within the Samgori District, which includes the Orkhevi and Airport settlements and other adjacent territories.

=== Military facilities ===
The Orkhevi settlement hosts one of the key facilities of the Defense Forces of Georgia — an active military-logistics hub, officially named the Transport (Automobile) Base of the Logistics Support Command (Georgian: თავდაცვის ძალების ლოგისტიკური უზრუნველყოფის სარდლობის სატრანსპორტო/საავტომობილო ბაზა). It plays a central role in the reception, maintenance, modernization, and distribution of military equipment.

Currently, the facility is the main site for implementing international military cooperation programs, particularly with Turkey, where ceremonies for the transfer of special and logistical equipment are held. Additionally, projects to renew the vehicle fleet of the Georgian army are carried out at the base. It is regularly used for official events, inspections by senior military leadership, and commemorative actions.

=== Industry and enterprises ===
==== Historical industrial facilities ====
During the Soviet period, Orkhevi was an important industrial and logistics center. The following facilities operated here:

- Samgorvodstroy Base (from 1948): A large complex that included central mechanical and auto repair shops, a garage, a sawmill, and warehouses.
- Reinforced concrete production sites (1963): In Orkhevi and Lilo for the needs of irrigation construction.
- Organic Fertilizer Plant (1962): A plant under construction, to which a pipeline was being laid over a new bridge across the Kura River.
- Textile and Haberdashery Combine (1971): Designed for the needs of the cooperative industry.
- Tbiltonnelstroy Reinforced Concrete Structures Plant (ZhBK) (1982): A key enterprise for supplying the construction of the Tbilisi Metro. The plant produced 20,000 cubic meters of precast reinforced concrete and 50,000 cubic meters of commercial concrete annually.
- Branch of the Tbilisi Construction Materials Combine (1986): Included workshops for the production of tools, plumbing fixtures, and finishing materials. In 1988, the Polymer Products Plant was opened here, producing plumbing fixtures and cladding tiles from marble waste.
- Kalinin Foundry Equipment Plant (1986): Construction of new buildings was planned in Orkhevi, which were scheduled to become operational in 1989.
- Solani Souvenir Production (1985): The construction of a new workshop, costing 1.2 million rubles, was planned.
- Repair Base of the Ministry of Local Industry (1987): Designed for the centralized repair of equipment for all enterprises of the ministry.

In the post-Soviet period, private companies were established based on these and other new enterprises. In 1998–1999, the joint-stock companies JSC Polymer Products and JSC Khalibi (a repair and mechanical plant) were registered in the Orkhevi industrial zone. In 1998, JSC Vaziani, which produced sparkling wine, also operated here.

==== Modern enterprises ====
In the 21st century, the Orkhevi industrial zone continues to operate, specializing mainly in the food, logistics, and construction sectors. Data from state monitoring by the National Food Agency from 2019 to 2025 confirms the activity of several major companies in the settlement.

- Dugladze Wine Company (Georgian: შპს დუგლაძეების ღვინის კომპანია) — a major producer of wines and brandy, at 8 Chantladze Dead End
- Respublika LLC (Georgian: შპს რესპუბლიკა) — a producer of dairy products under the trademarks "Malko" and "Ranina," at 26a Tengiz Chantladze Street. The company's activities have repeatedly been the subject of state control.
- Fruit Logistics LLC (Georgian: შპს ფრუტ ლოჯისტიკა) – a logistics and supply company, based in the Orkhevi Military Settlement area.
- Agroflora LLC (Georgian: შპს აგროფლორა) – a logistics and supply company, at: 1 M. Abashidze-Saparova Street.
- Dako Trade LLC (Georgian: შპს დაკო ტრეიდ) — a grocery packaging and distribution company, at 3 Chantladze Street.
- Foodservice LLC (Georgian: შპს ფუდსერვისი) — a distributor and importer of food products, at 40 Chantladze Street.
- Plastics Georgia and Lider Plast — enterprises for the production of plastic products.
- Tsunda — a furniture factory.

=== Modern development and social facilities ===
As part of municipal social programs, there is a social housing block with 75 apartments for socially vulnerable families on Mukhadze Street in Orkhevi. In 2015, with the approval of new rules for registering the homeless and the creation of a special municipal commission in Tbilisi, it was announced that the construction of a municipal shelter in Orkhevi, for temporary housing of up to 80 families, was nearing completion. However, the operation of social housing has also been marked by conflicts: in May 2025, residents of a dilapidated building opposed the city hall's resettlement plans, demanding prior legal guarantees for receiving new housing. These facilities are under regular monitoring by city services, as confirmed by reports from the Tbilisi Sakrebulo for 2018, 2021, and 2023.

The late 2010s and early 2020s were marked by a period of infrastructure renewal in the settlement. According to Sakrebulo reports, these works were often a response to problems voiced by residents at meetings with the district's majoritarian deputy, Giorgi Tkemaladze, and were included in the city budget. For instance, in 2018, construction of a storm drainage system began on Petritsi, Kakabadze, Gokieli, and Tsutsunava streets to solve a long-standing flooding problem. In 2019, new recreational areas were created: a square (500 m²) and a sports ground on Mukhadze Street, as well as a large-scale improvement of Orkhevi Central Park, where a green area of 13,000 m² was tidied up, and attractions on a children's playground and fitness equipment were installed on a 3,000 m² plot. In 2021, the road infrastructure on Mukhadze Street was completely renovated, including asphalt paving, curb installation, and the construction of pedestrian walkways.

As part of the settlement's improvement efforts in 2021, landscaping work was carried out. Specifically, the company Botanica implemented a project to improve the green areas on Giorgi Mukhadze Street (near the Vakhtang Pangani sports ground), during which new lawns were created, and new trees, flowers, and shrubs were planted.

Also in 2021, the TV channel Imedi produced a segment about the residents of a building on Tengiz Chantladze Dead End, who collectively transformed their yard (presumably 5 T. Chantladze Dead End). The initiative, which began in 2015, turned an abandoned area into a well-kept green square. The residents, having formed a homeowners' association (amkhanagoba), independently planted trees, shrubs, and flowers, and created flowerbeds, including from makeshift materials like car tires. Some seedlings and benches were provided with the assistance of local authorities, but the main work of maintaining and developing the square fell to the residents themselves. Children also participated in the beautification, helping their parents water the plants and keep the area clean. One resident, Avto, built and installed birdhouses in the yard with the help of the children. According to him, this activity is not only a way to beautify the surrounding space but also an important element of upbringing.

=== Education ===
==== Historical educational institutions ====
During the Soviet period, the settlement had a kindergarten and a crèche (since 1950), courses for the training and advanced training of construction workers (since 1953), and the Gruzglavmontazhspetsstroy training center (since 1982).

==== Modern educational institutions ====
Educational institutions in Orkhevi

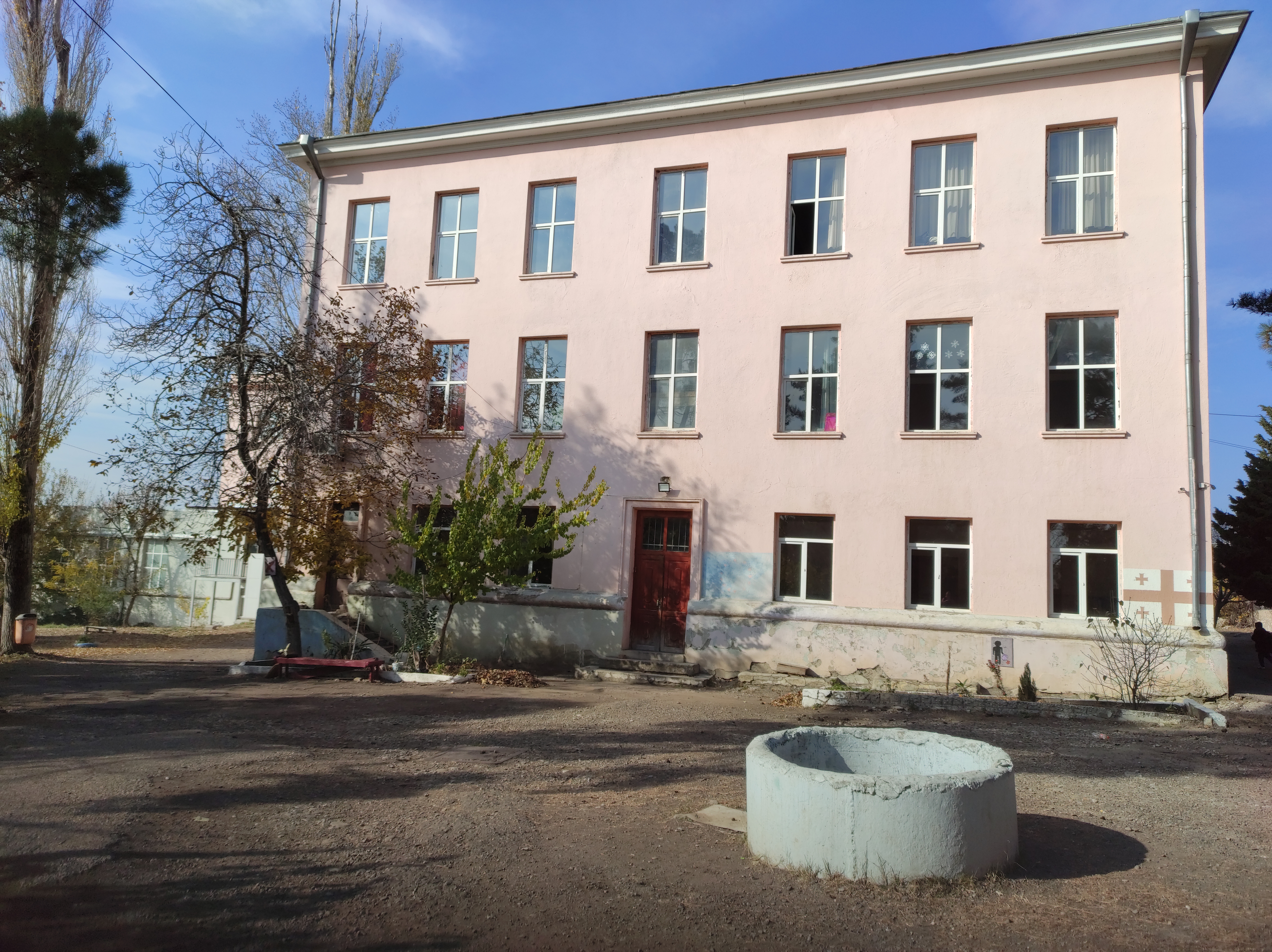
Public School No. 156

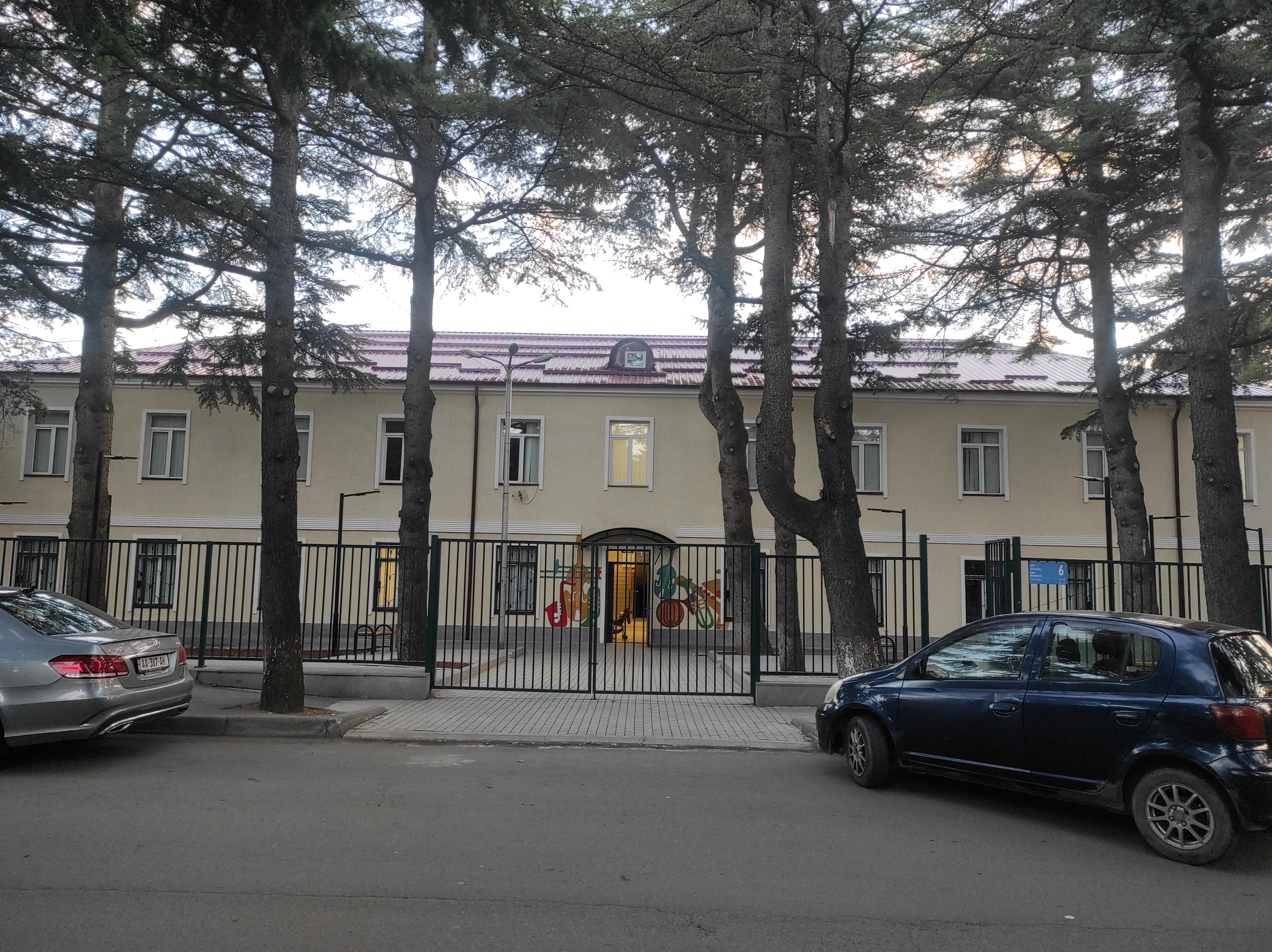
Otar Taktakishvili Art School No. 19

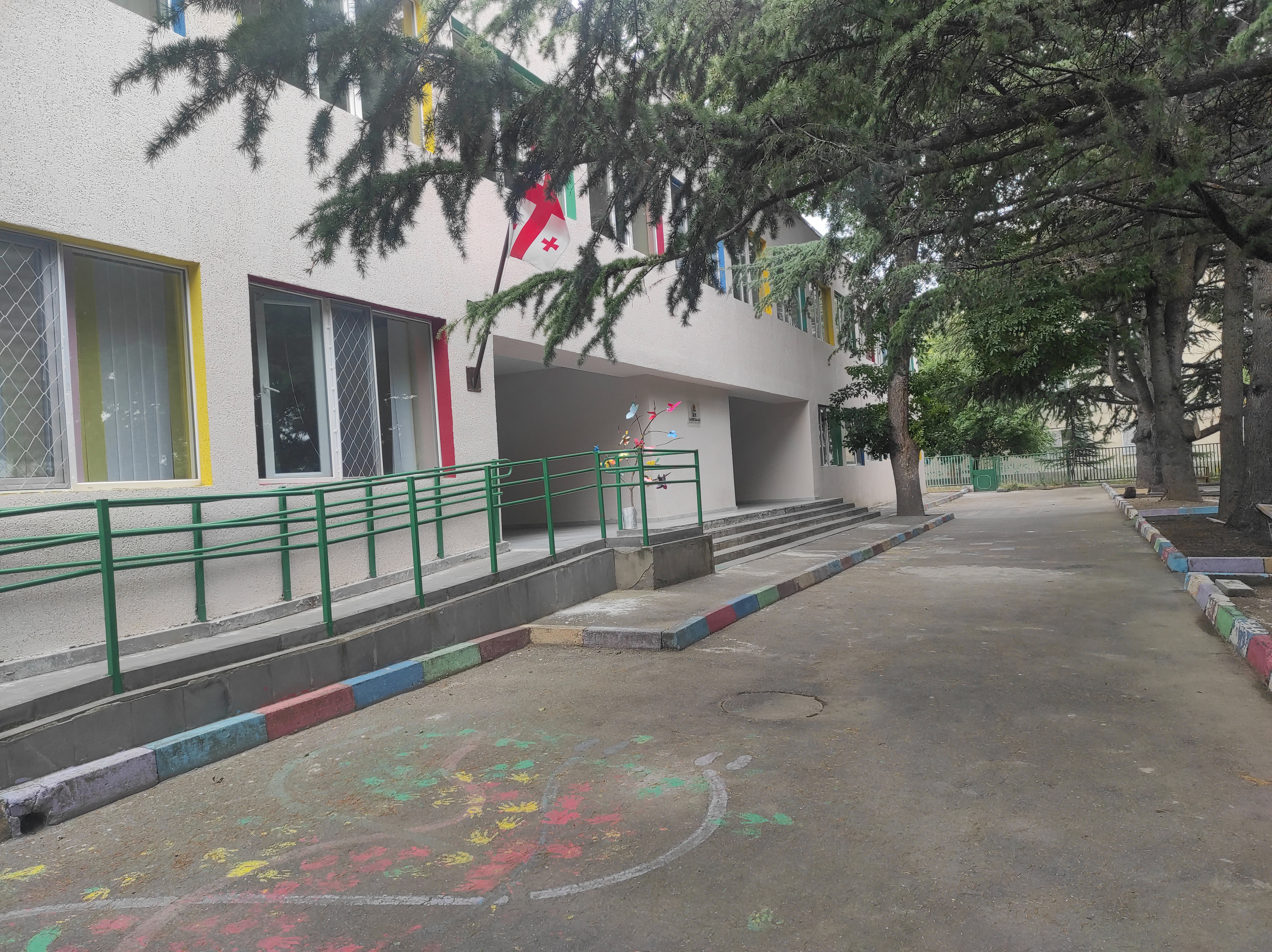
Kindergarten No. 76

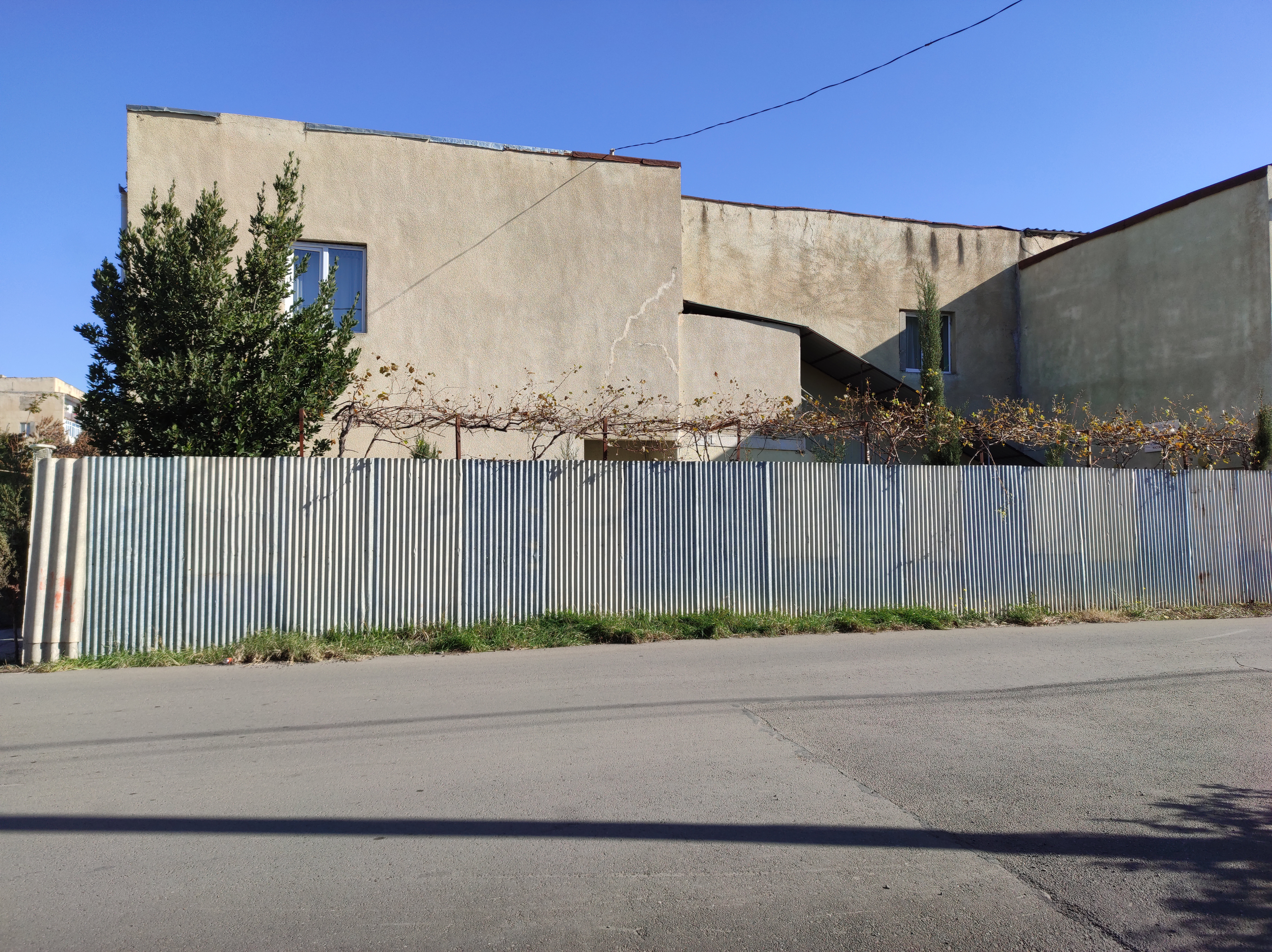
Private School-Lyceum "Santeli"

- Secondary School No. 156 (28 Tengiz Chantladze St.). In 2019, a comprehensive renovation of the school, designed for 1000 students, began.
- Otar Taktakishvili Art School No. 19 (6 Koba Abzianidze St.) is a municipal educational institution, part of a network of 33 art schools under the Department of Culture, Education, Sport, and Youth Affairs of the Tbilisi City Hall. The school offers training in various creative fields, including music, theater, and choreography.
- Kindergarten No. 76.
- Private kindergarten "Zuzunebi" (Georgian: ზუზუნები; lit. 'Bees') – is located at 4 Tengiz Chantladze Street.
- Santeli Private School-Lyceum.

==== Library ====
Cultural Institution

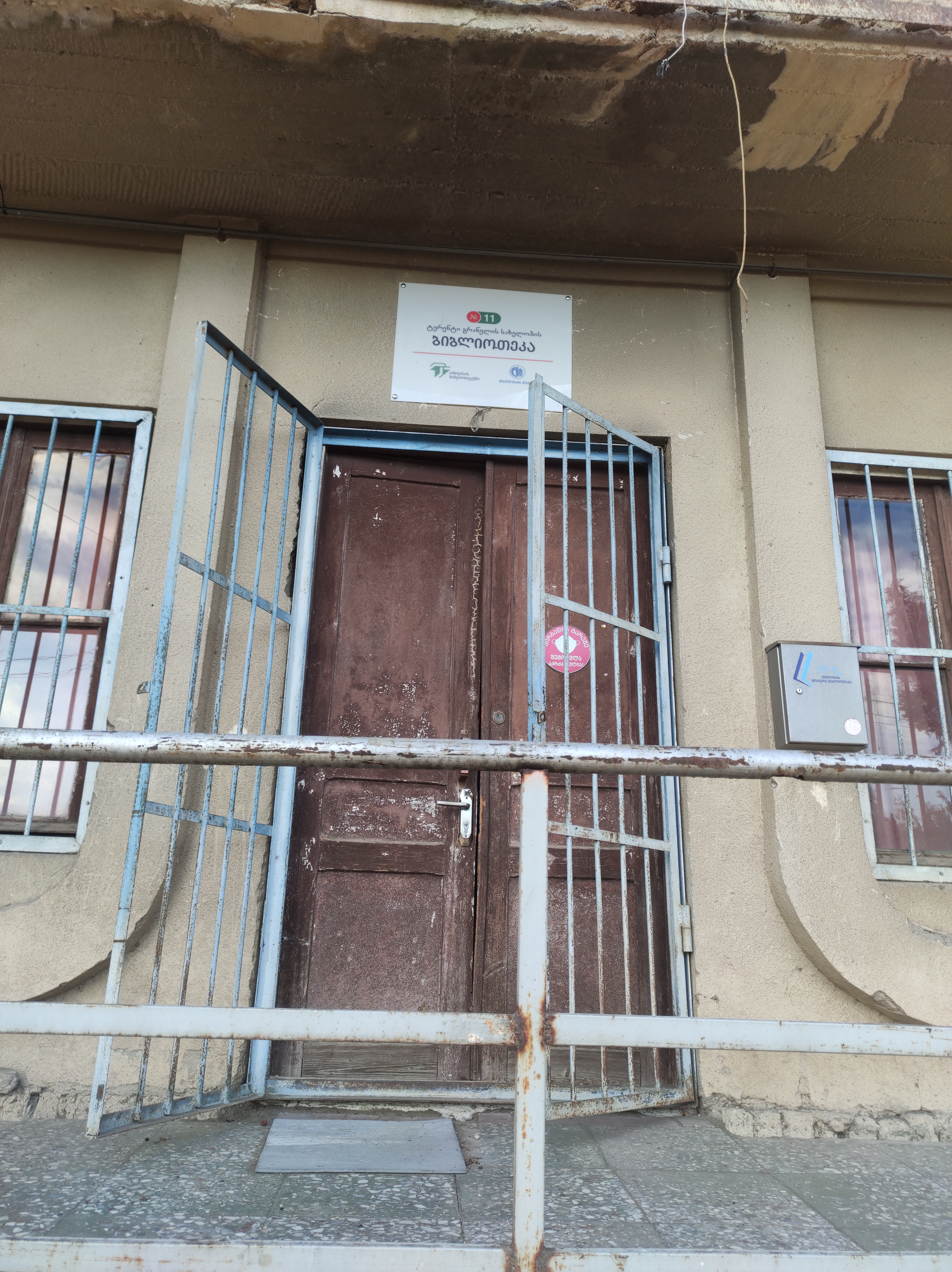
The Terenti Graneli Library

The Terenti Graneli Library (6/6 Mukhadze St.) is branch No. 11 of the Tbilisi Multifunctional Libraries network. It is the successor to the public library opened to readers in 1951. According to the official directory of Tbilisi libraries, its founding year is 1950. As of 2018 (then branch No. 44), its collection comprised 13,066 items, with 920 registered readers.

=== Healthcare ===
During the Soviet period, an outpatient clinic and a polyclinic operated in the settlement. However, in the post-Soviet era, access to primary medical care became a problem. In 2015 and 2017, at meetings of the Sakrebulo commissions, the issue of opening primary healthcare facilities in Orkhevi was repeatedly raised. It was noted that the buildings of former polyclinics remained in the settlement and could be rehabilitated for the needs of the population. The problem became particularly acute in July 2016, when Orkhevi residents held a protest demanding the restoration of the former Polyclinic No. 22. According to a news report, this medical facility was closed back in 2011 through a merger with Polyclinic No. 16 in Lilo, and at the time of the protest, its building was already being dismantled. The protest, initiated by an opposition representative, escalated into clashes.

=== Commerce and services ===
==== Soviet and 1990s facilities ====
In 1988, an "AvtoVAZtekhobsluzhivaniya" (AvtoVAZ Technical Service) center was opened in Orkhevi at Orkhevi, 2, where owners of old Zhiguli and GAZ cars could exchange them for new models with an additional payment. The compensation for a traded-in car ranged from 400 to 600 rubles for a Zhiguli and from 200 to 1000 rubles for a GAZ. In 1992, during the period of hyperinflation, Orkhevi had the Kavkazsky Bank and Korolevsky Bank, where currency exchange was conducted. Since 1998, the state insurance company Samgori was at 6 Akhvlediani St., offering a wide range of services from life insurance to crop and auto liability insurance.

==== Modern facilities ====
In Orkhevi, there are large supermarket chains such as Ori Nabiji, Spar, Libre, and Nikora, as well as pharmacies from the Aversi and Blue Cross chains. There are ATMs and payment terminals for Bank of Georgia, TBC Bank, and Liberty Bank. There is a McDonald's on the Kakheti Highway. The settlement also has numerous small shops, bakeries (tone), butcher shops, car repair shops, and other service facilities.

- Vako Motors — a large auto service center specializing in the repair and maintenance of European trucks (Mercedes-Benz, Iveco, Scania, Volvo, MAN, Renault). The company also sells spare parts and performs diagnostics.
- McDonald's — a branch in the southern part of Orkhevi, on the Kakheti Highway, opened in July 2022. It has become notable in Orkhevi due to its modern concept: it is positioned as "eco-friendly", equipped with solar panels on the roof and a charging station for electric cars. It is fully adapted for people with disabilities.

=== Culture, religion and recreation ===
==== Soviet-era facilities ====
In 1950, the construction of a club with 300 seats (later the House of Culture) was completed in the settlement, and a post office was opened. By 1951, the club was already hosting concerts, including tours by the choir of the State Philharmonic of the Lithuanian SSR, and a public library was opened. In 1989, a video bar was opened in the Orkhevi House of Culture. Subsequently, the House of Culture building was demolished.

==== Modern facilities ====
See section

=== Transport ===
For many years, transport accessibility remained one of the key problems for the residents of Orkhevi. In 2015–2016, complaints about a shortage of buses and inconvenient schedules were discussed at the municipal level. As a result, specific measures were taken: in April 2015, the operating hours of bus routes were extended into the evening, with the last guaranteed trips from Isani metro station at 22:55 and 23:30, and in August 2016, a new minibus route No. 107 was launched, connecting Tetrikhevi and Orkhevi with the Isani metro station.

Currently, the settlement is connected to the center of Tbilisi and the Isani metro station only by bus routes, including numbers 312, 322, 337, 341, 361 and 408, which run along the Kakheti Highway (south of the settlement). However, the main transport route for the settlement remains bus route 356, which runs from Tetrikhevges, through the main roads of Orkhevi, to the Isani metro station. In 2019, new comfortable buses from Isuzu were introduced on this route (then numbered 56), equipped with air conditioning and adapted for people with disabilities.

== Monuments and notable places ==
Memorials and commemorative signs

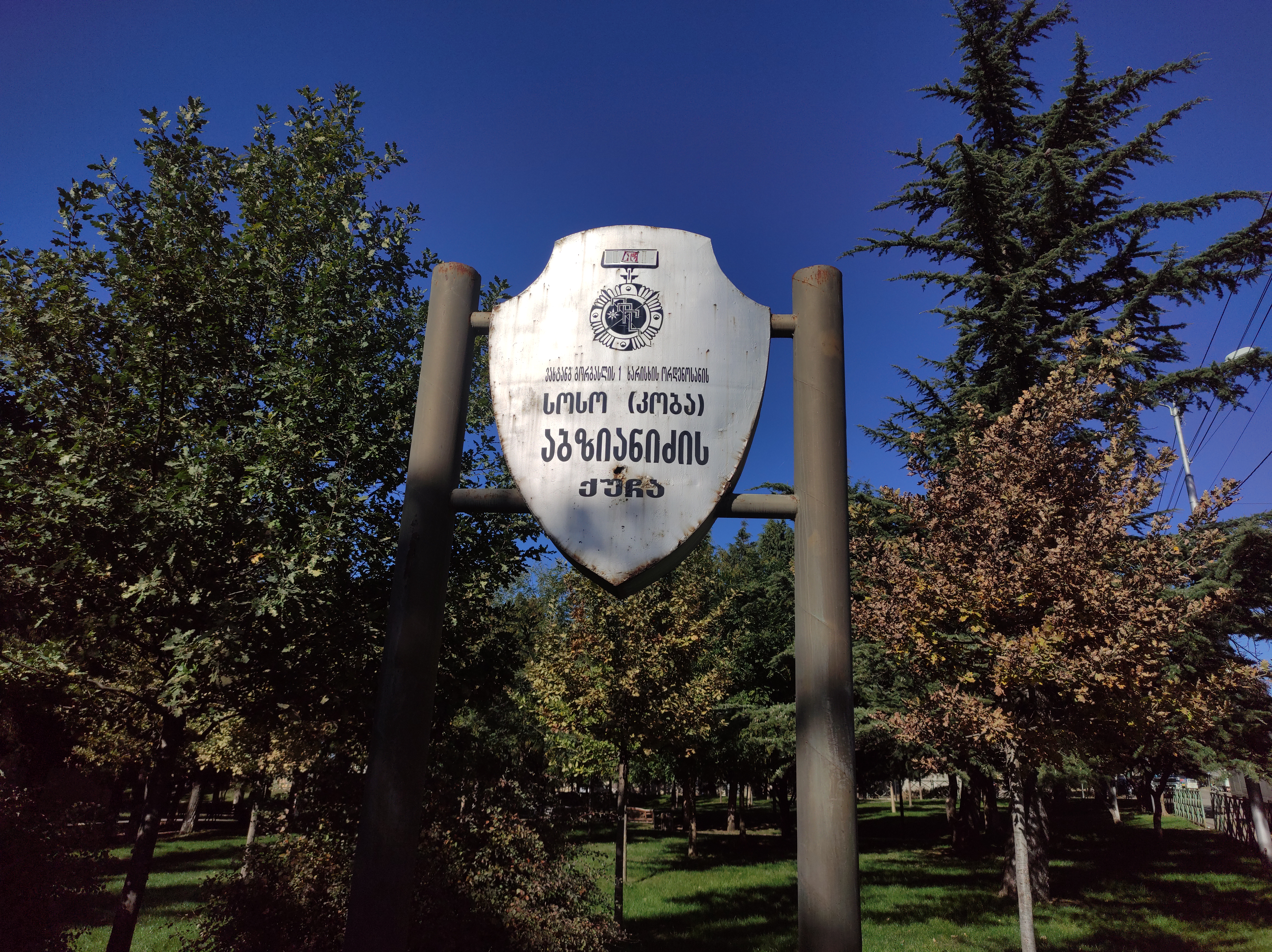
Information stand in honor of Soso (Koba) Abzianidze in the central park.

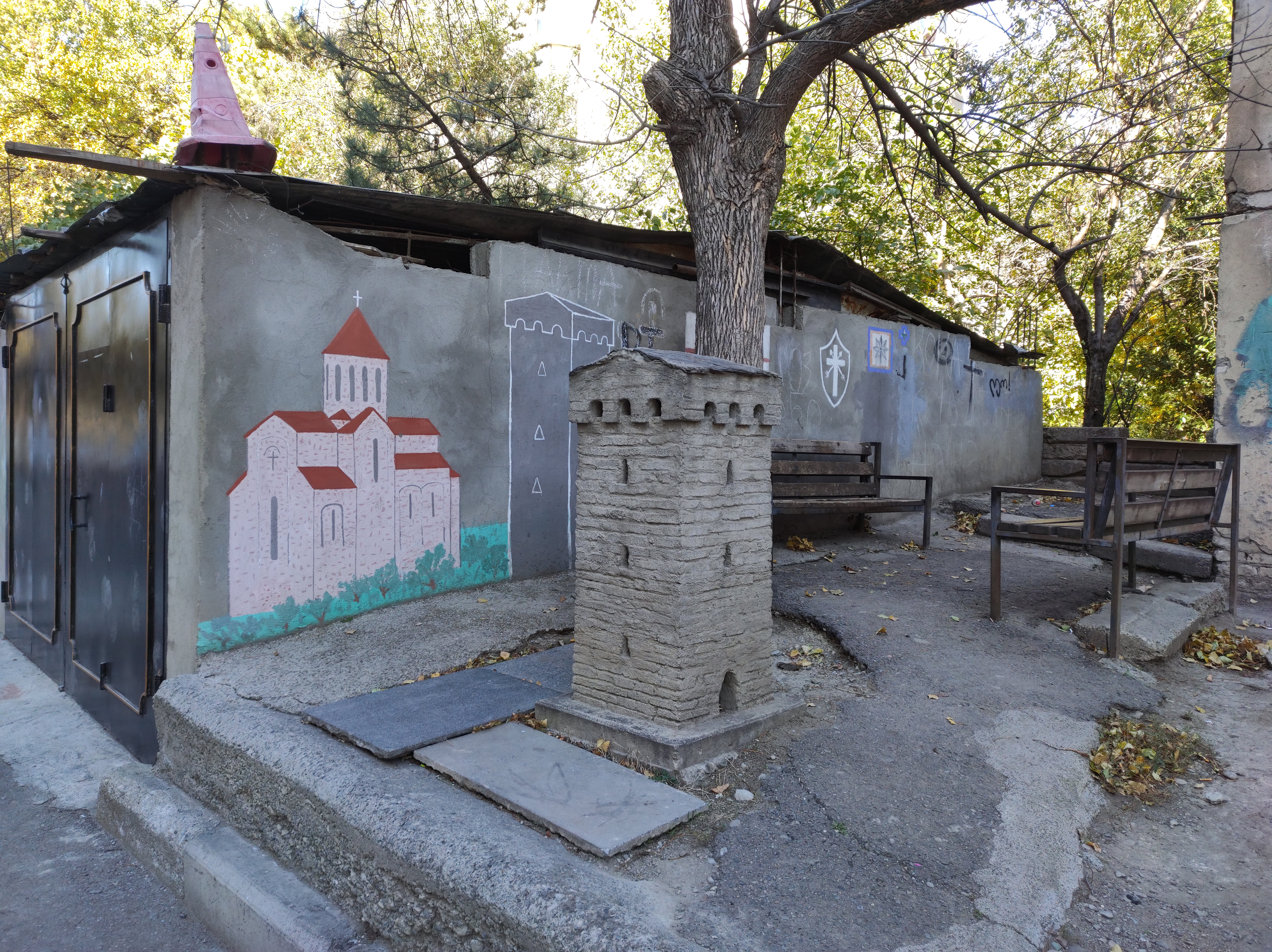
Svan Tower memorial.

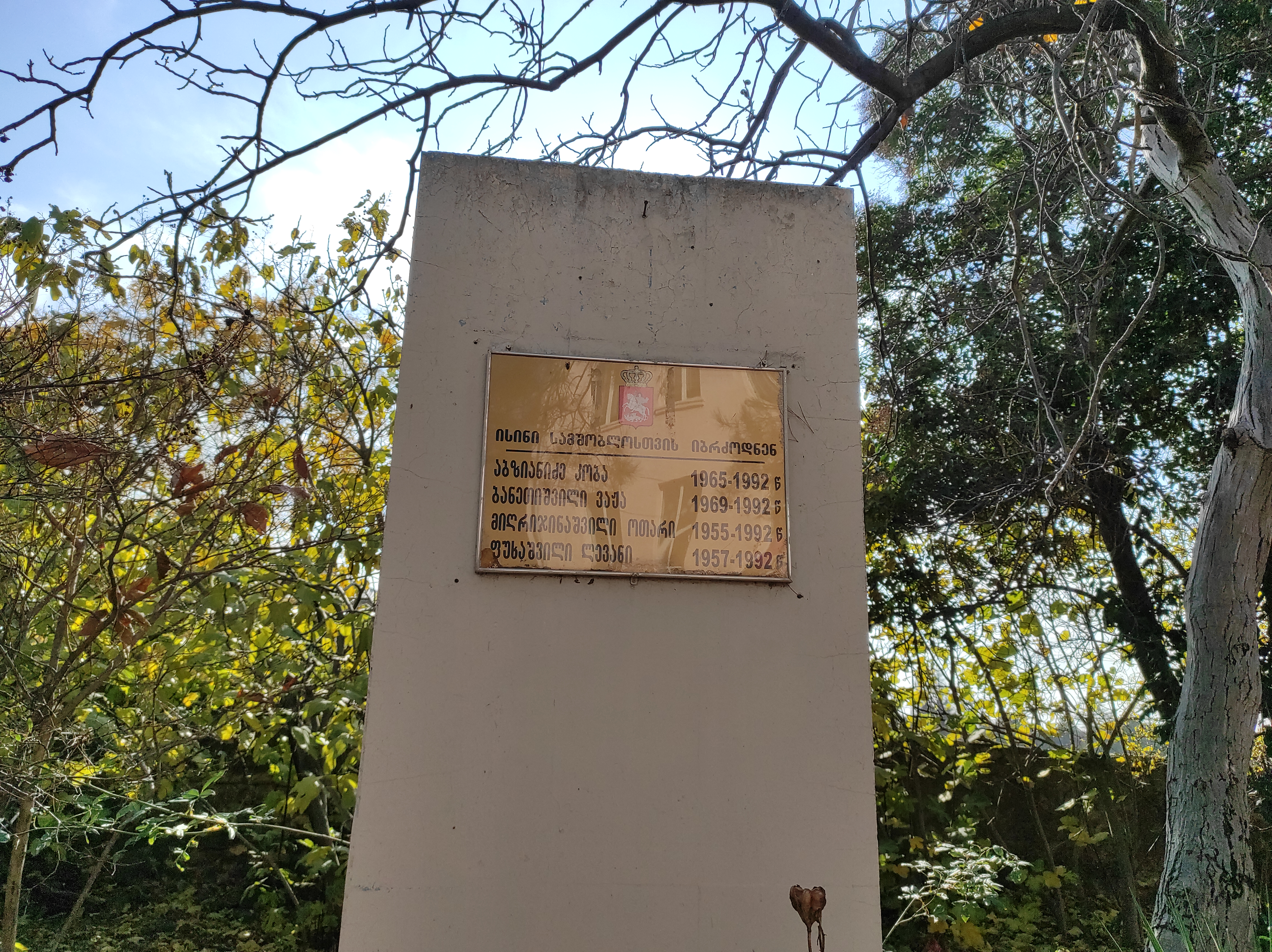
"They fought for Motherland" memorial plaque.

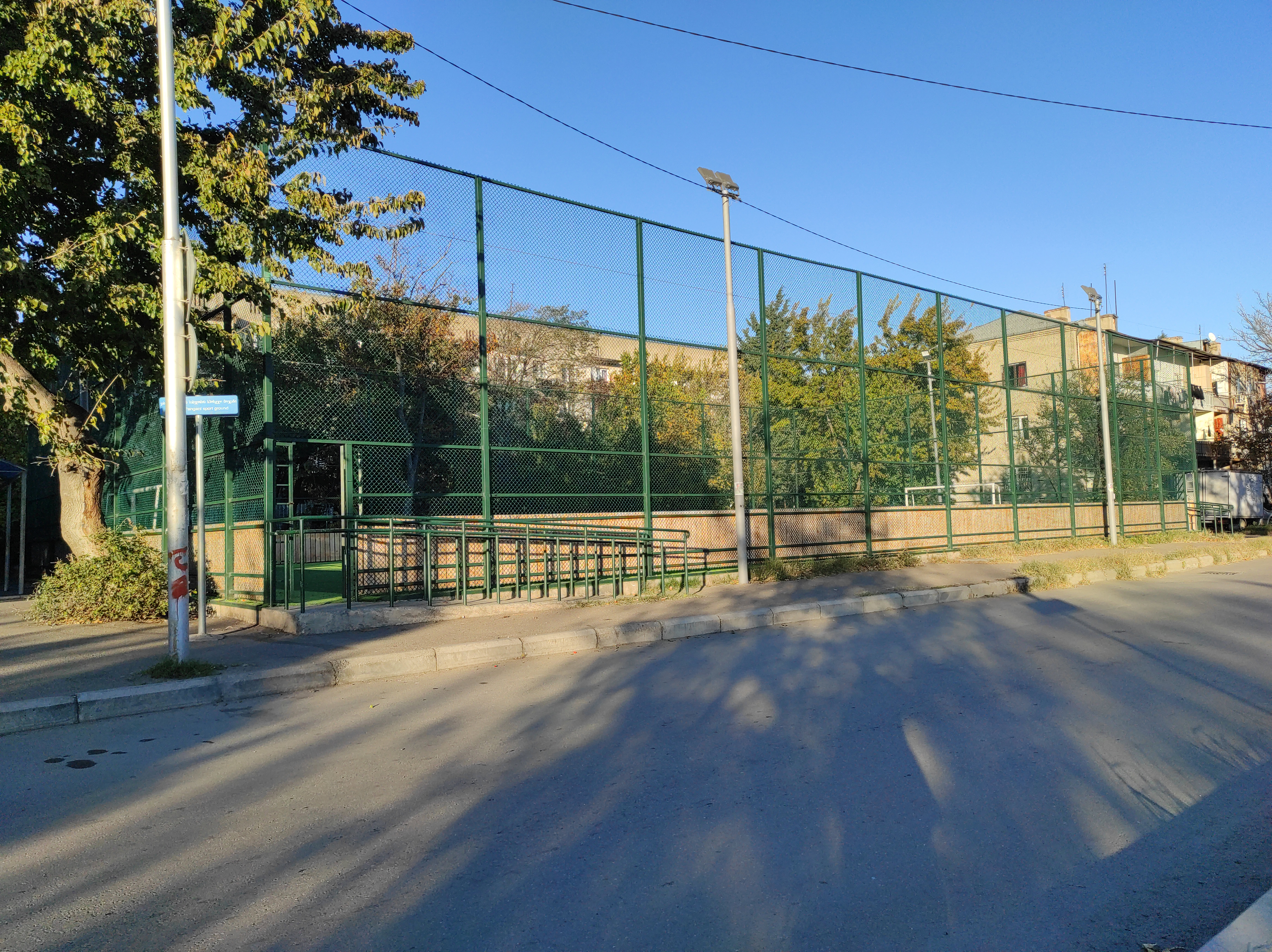
Vakhtang Pangani Football Pitch.

=== Memorials and commemorative signs ===
Several objects have been installed in the settlement to commemorate local residents and tragic events.

- Information stand in honor of Koba Abzianidze — a stand is installed in the Central Park dedicated to the street named after Soso (Koba) Abzianidze, a recipient of the Order of Vakhtang Gorgasali, 1st degree.
- Memorial in the form of a Svan tower — installed by Paata Gujejiani on October 10, 2014, in memory of local residents Kakha Kalandarishvili (09.11.1967–08.05.2024) and Gegi Kvitsiani (16.10.1988–14.02.2018).
- Memorial plaque "They Fought for the Motherland" — installed in public school No. 156, in memory of the settlement's residents who died in 1992 during the Georgian–Abkhazian conflict. The plaque, with the coat of arms of Georgia and the inscription "They Fought for the Motherland" (ისინი სამშობლოსთვის იბრძოდნენ), lists the names of four individuals:
  - Koba Abzianidze (1965–1992)
  - Vazha Banetishvili (1969–1992)
  - Otari Migrijinashvili (1955–1992)
  - Levan Pukhashvili (1957–1992)
- Vakhtang Pangani Football Pitch — On October 18, 2020, at the initiative of local residents and by the decision of the city council (Sakrebulo), the sports ground was named after Vakhtang Pangani, a young footballer, captain of the WIT Georgia club and a member of the Tbilisi age-group team, who grew up in Orkhevi and died in 2013.

=== Religious sites ===
Religious sites in Orkhevi

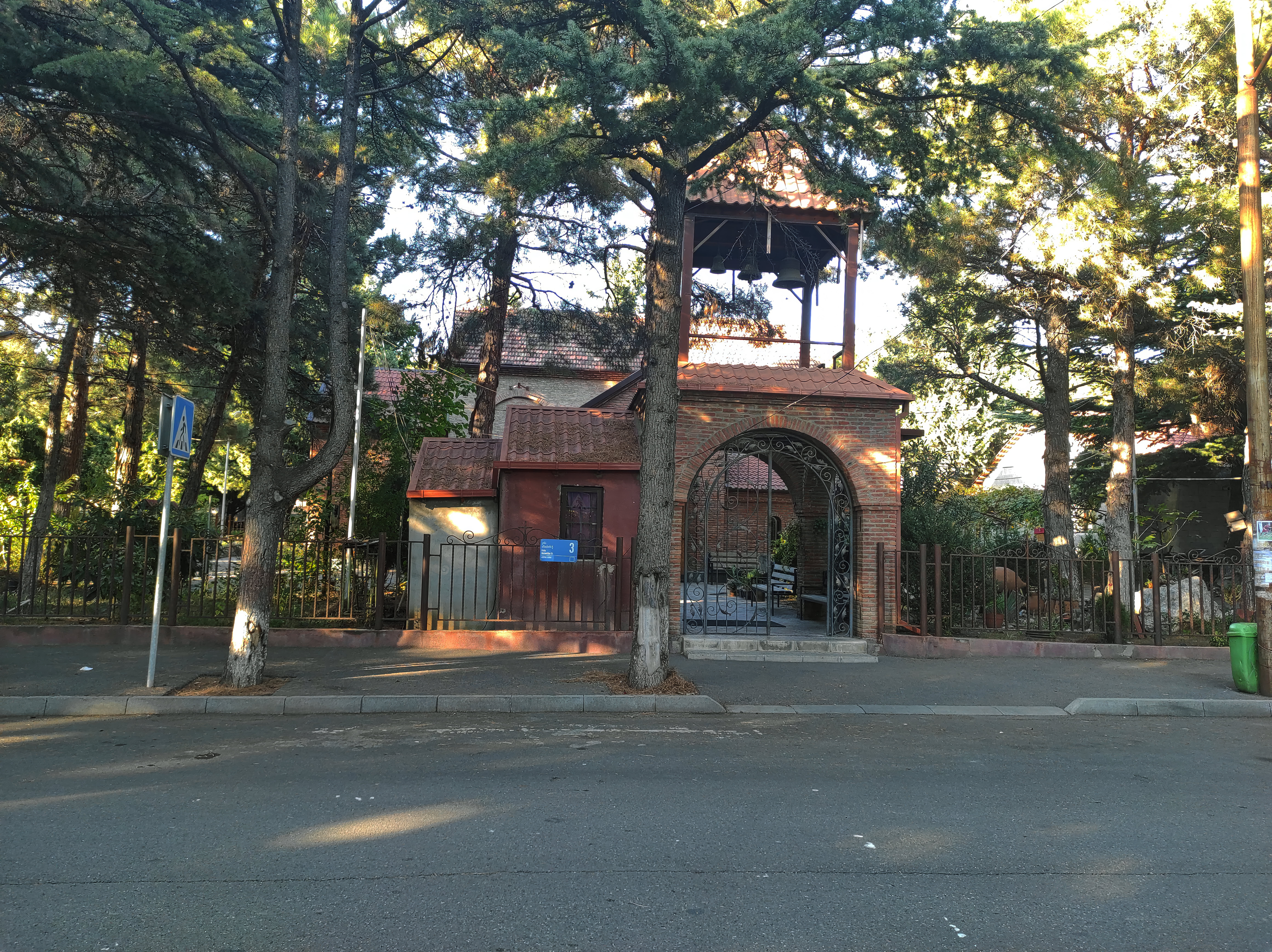
St. Nino Church.

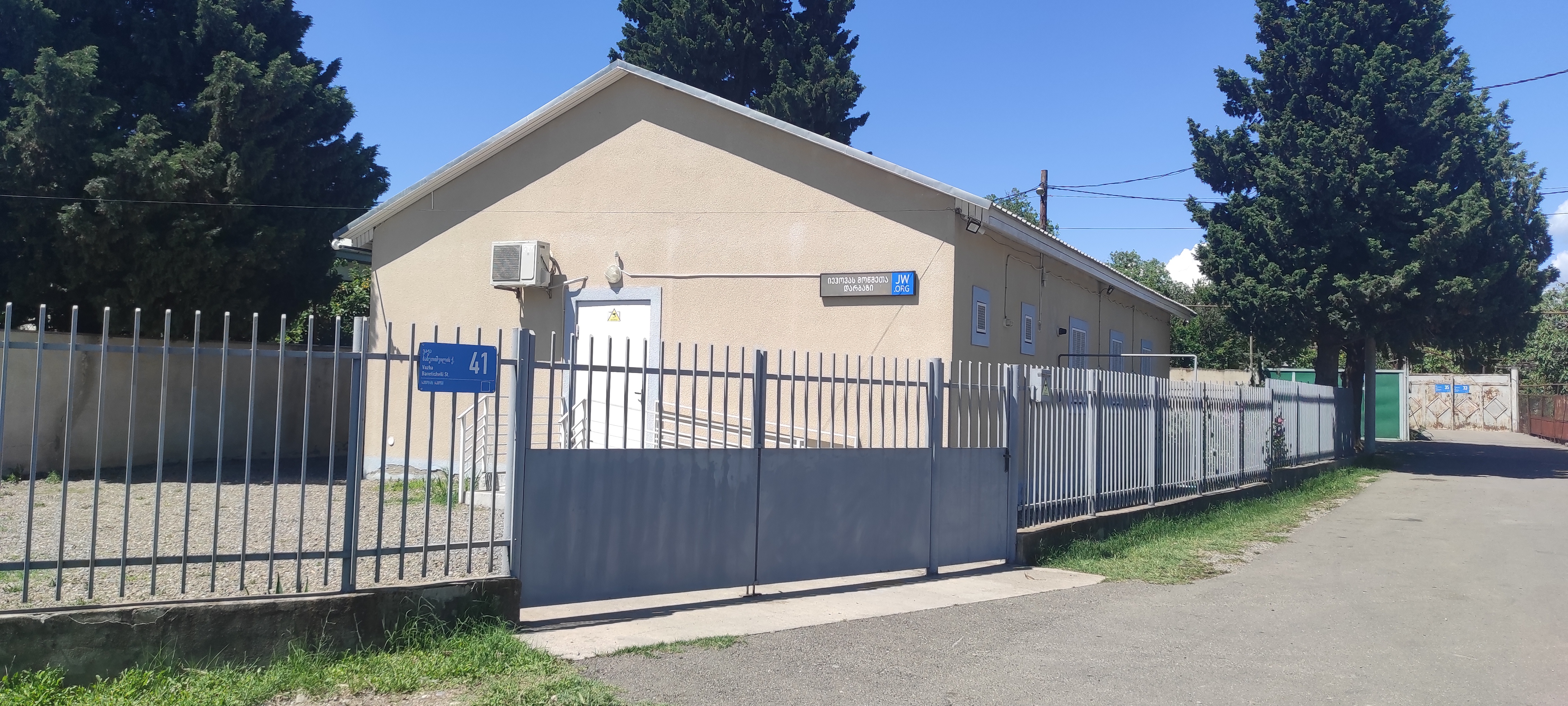
Kingdom Hall of Jehovah's Witnesses.

- Church of Saint Nino — a Georgian Orthodox church in the Central Park at 3 Koba Abzianidze Street. The construction of the church began in 2000 on the initiative and with the funds of local resident Giorgi (Gia) Jakeli, first deputy chairman of the Defense and Security Committee, chairman of the temporary commission of the Parliament of Georgia for finding persons missing in the battles for the territorial integrity of Georgia, and a member of the Citizens' Union faction. It was designed by architect Nodar Molotashvili in collaboration with the Church Architecture Department of the Patriarchate of Georgia. The construction of the church, built in Orkhevi's Central Park from brick, blocks, and tiles (which, according to the architect, last much longer than galvanized iron), involved 12 military personnel as well as local residents who made donations. The church was consecrated on June 1, 2000, the day of Saint Nino's entry into Georgia. The church quickly became an important community center. In 2002, a memorial service was held here for its main ktitor, Giorgi (Gia) Jakeli, completing his history of service to the church.
- Kingdom Hall of Jehovah's Witnesses (იეჰოვას მოწმეთა დარბაზი) — a place for meetings of Jehovah's Witnesses, at 41 Vazha Banetishvili Street.

=== Culture and recreation ===
- Orkhevi Central Park (22 Tengiz Chantladze St.) — the main recreational area of the settlement. The Church of Saint Nino stands within it. In 2017, a greening campaign was held in the Central Park, during which about 200 cypress seedlings were planted with the participation of local residents. In 2019, a large-scale reconstruction was carried out in the park: a green area of 13,000 m² was tidied up, and on a 3,000 m² plot, attractions were installed in the children's playground and fitness equipment was set up. (Note: In some official documents, for example, in news about improvements, the park may be referred to as the "central square" (ცენტრალური სკვერი), which is a common practice for designating district green areas.)
- Square on Mukhadze Street — a landscaped recreation area of 500 m², opened in 2019. It has children's attractions, a gazebo, benches, and a lighting system, and the pedestrian paths are paved with decorative tiles. A sports ground of 529 m² was also set up next to the square.
- New square near Kakheti Highway — a large recreational space in the southern part of the settlement, opened in 2024. On an area of 6,500 m², recreation areas, a children's and fitness playground, as well as a modern sports field with artificial turf were set up. The project, which cost 643,000 lari, also included the installation of lighting and irrigation systems. The opening of the square was attended by the Deputy Mayor of Tbilisi and the leadership of the Samgori district.
- House of Culture — in Soviet times, the center of the settlement's social life. In the late 1980s, reflecting the spirit of change, its director Nugzar Iakobiaze showed entrepreneurial initiative: for the new year of 1989, a video bar was opened in an empty hall, where, along with watching films, visitors were offered pastries and khachapuri. As of 2023, the House of Culture building has been demolished.

=== Historical sites ===
Historical site

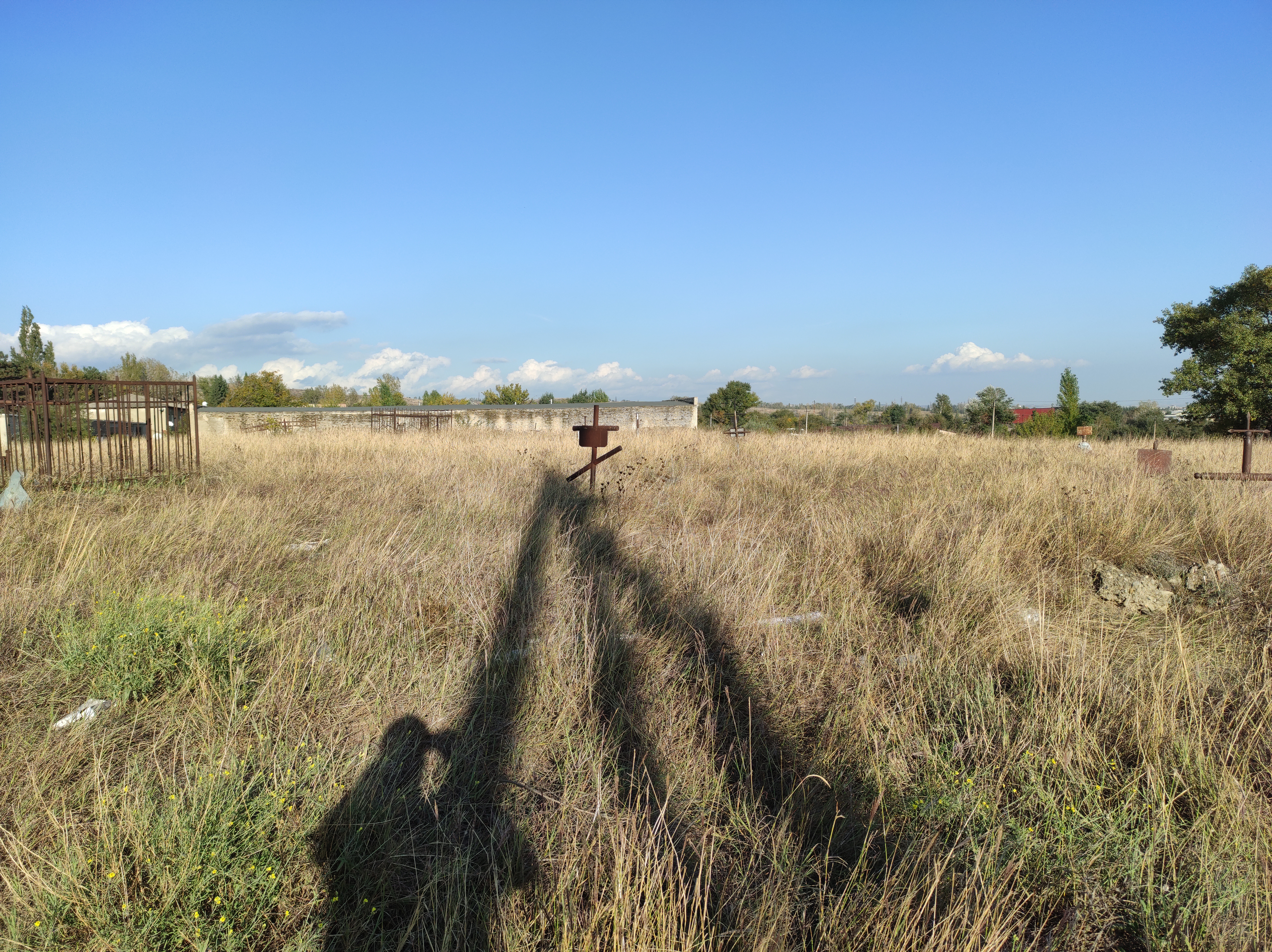
The abandoned mid-20th century cemetery in Orkhevi.

- Abandoned cemetery — there is an old cemetery where burials from the mid-20th century are preserved, including the grave of the infant Alexey Kucherenko (1955). However, the names on many graves have faded.

== Gallery ==
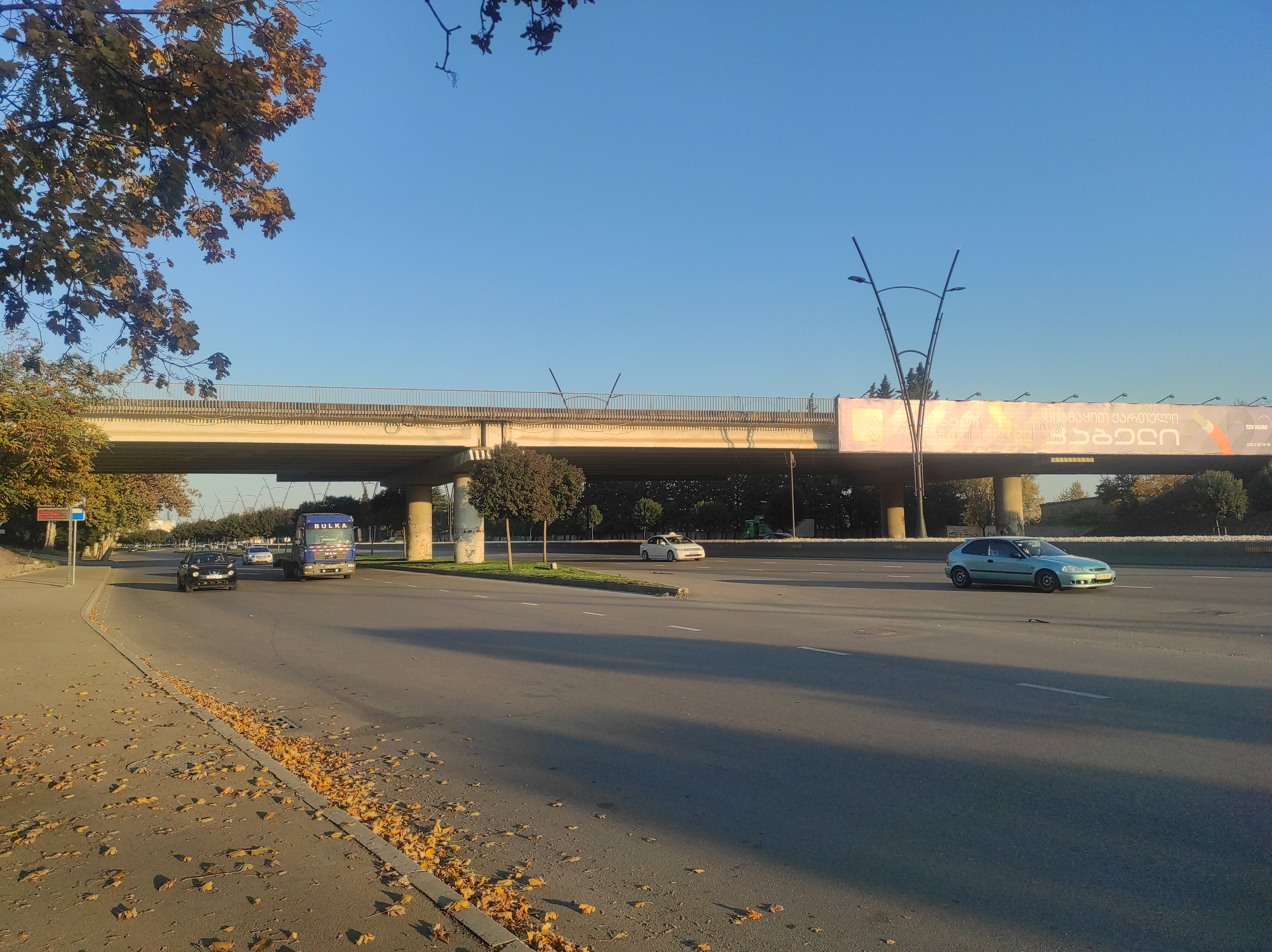
Orkhevi Bridge

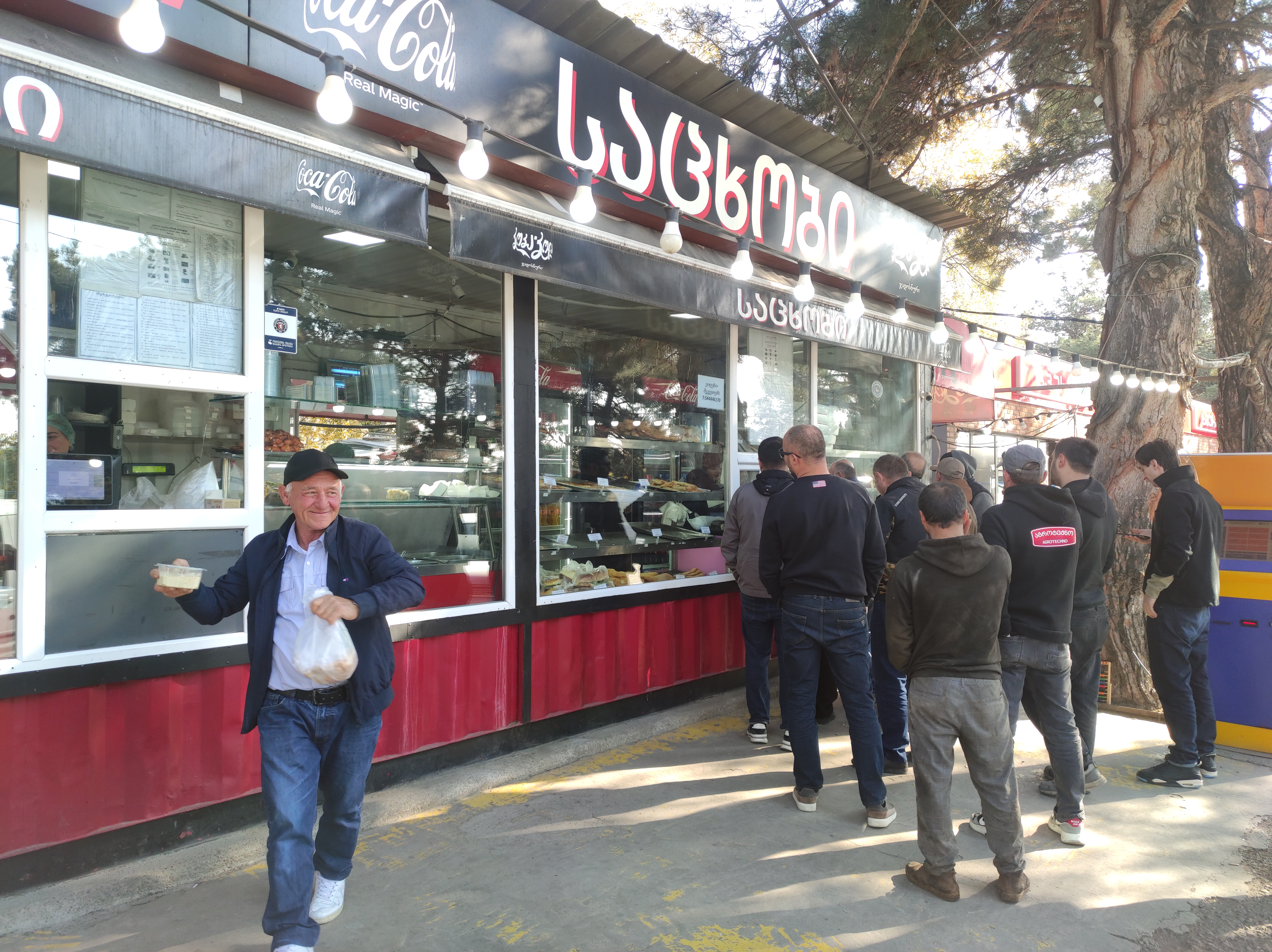
At the bakery

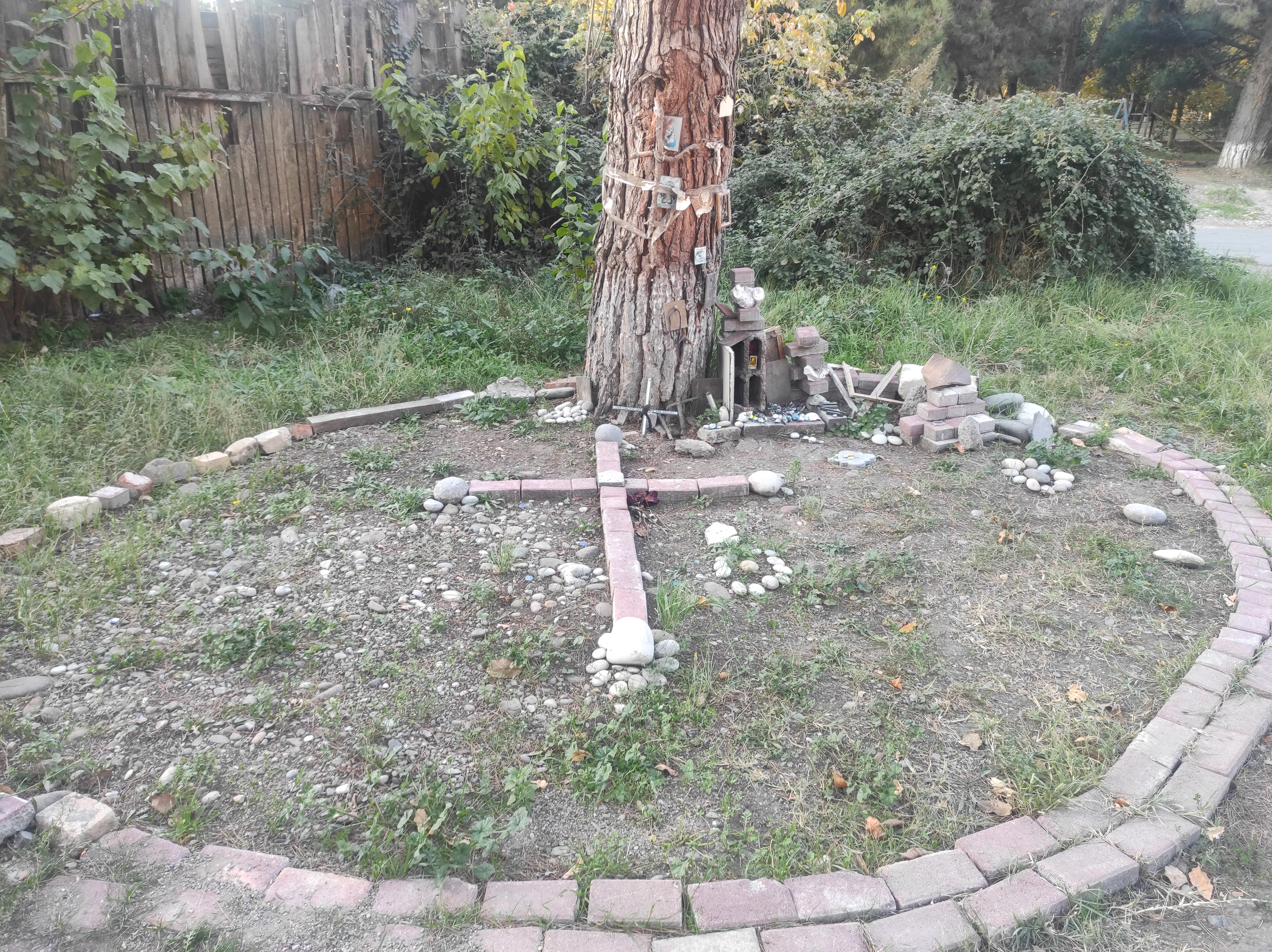
Folk memorial 1

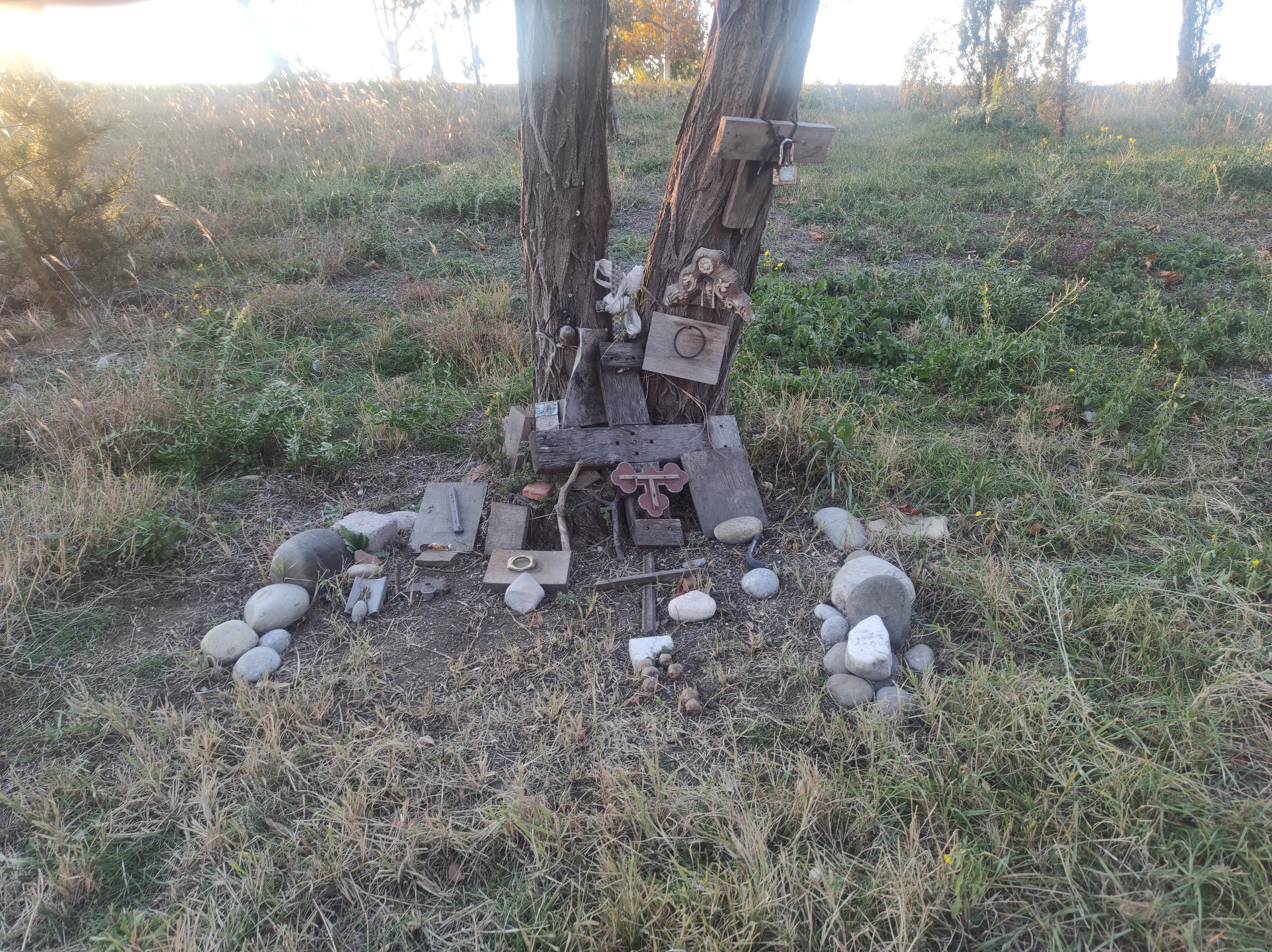
Folk memorial 2

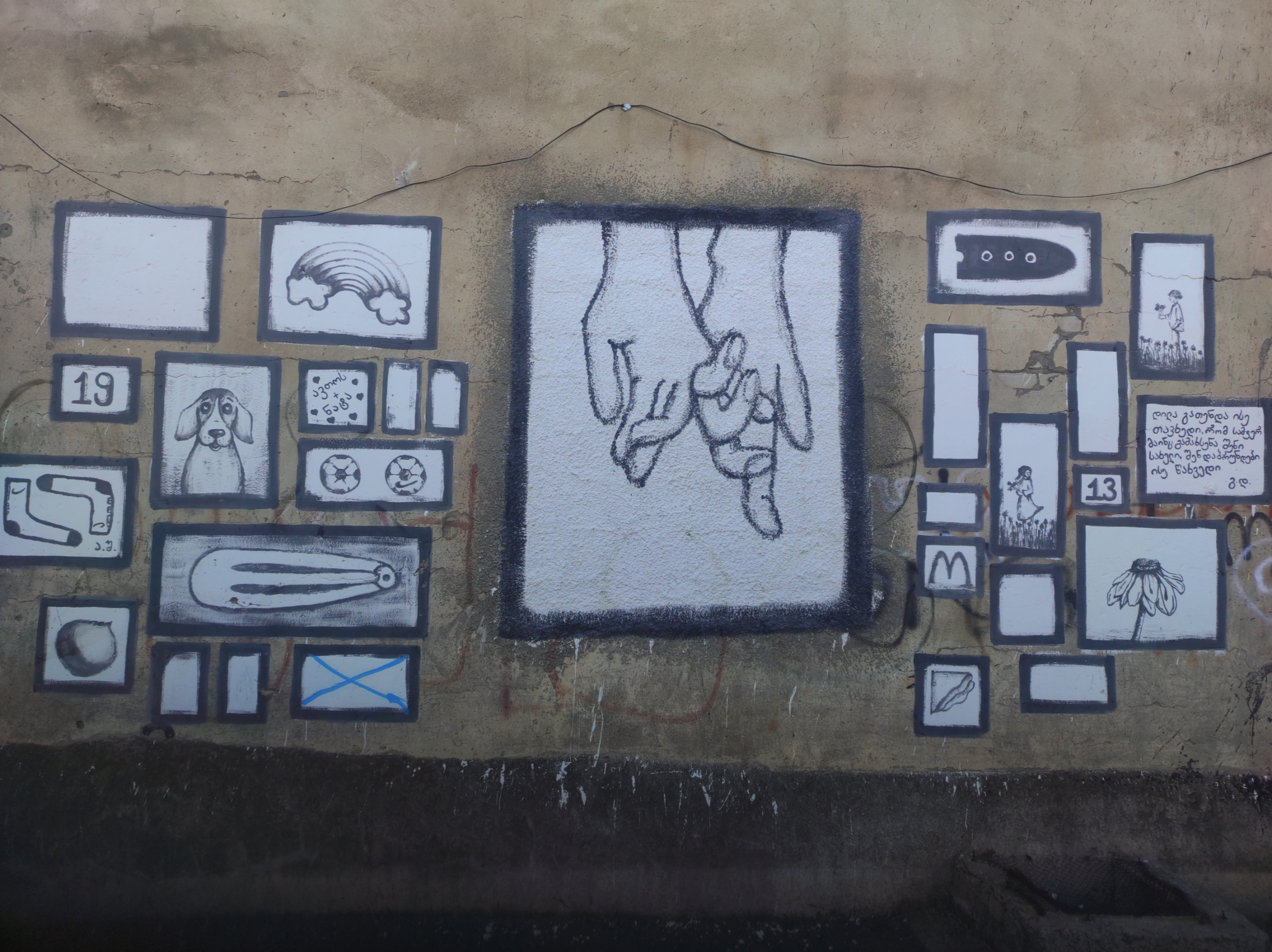
Street Art. Unknown author

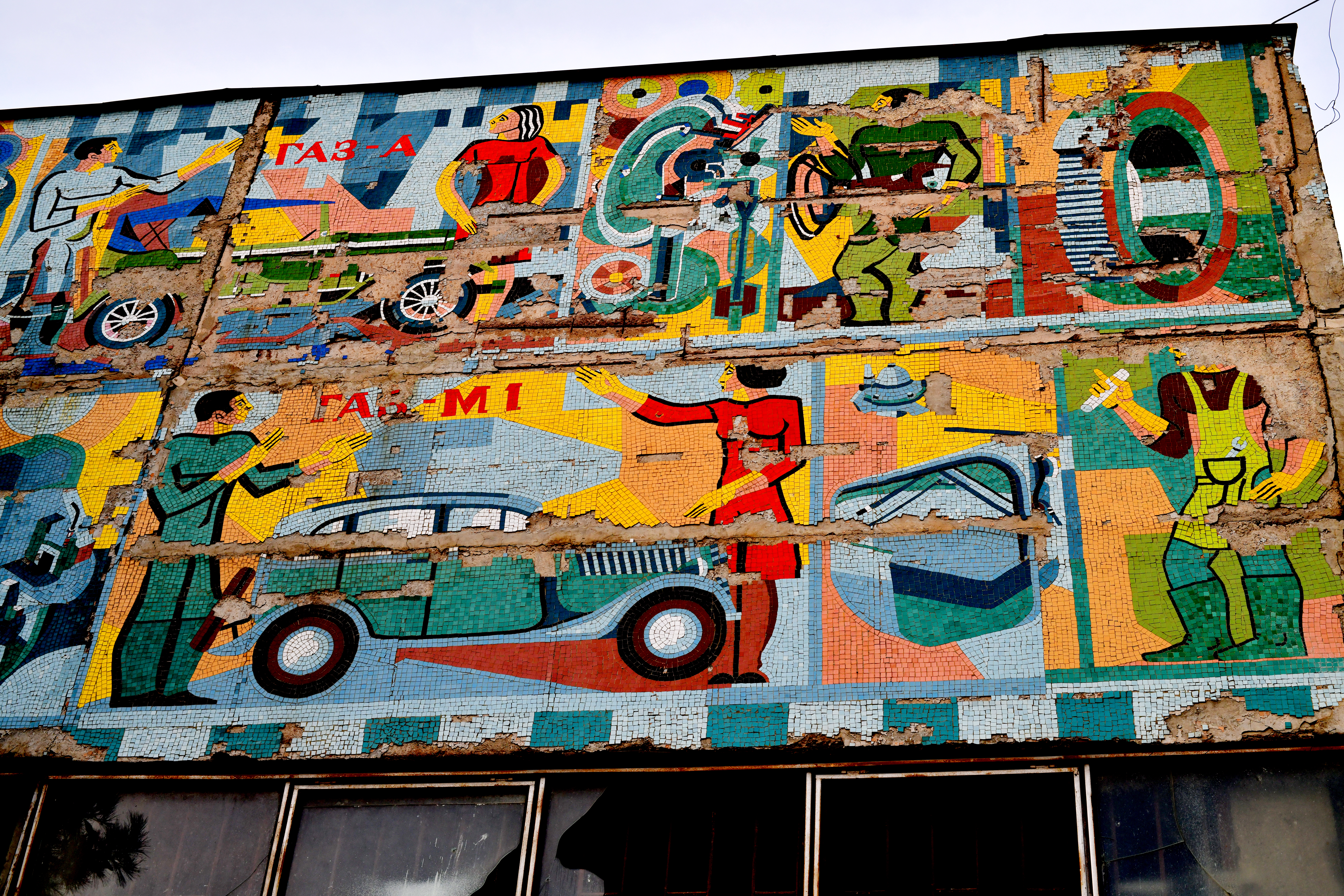
Soviet art at Auto repair №16

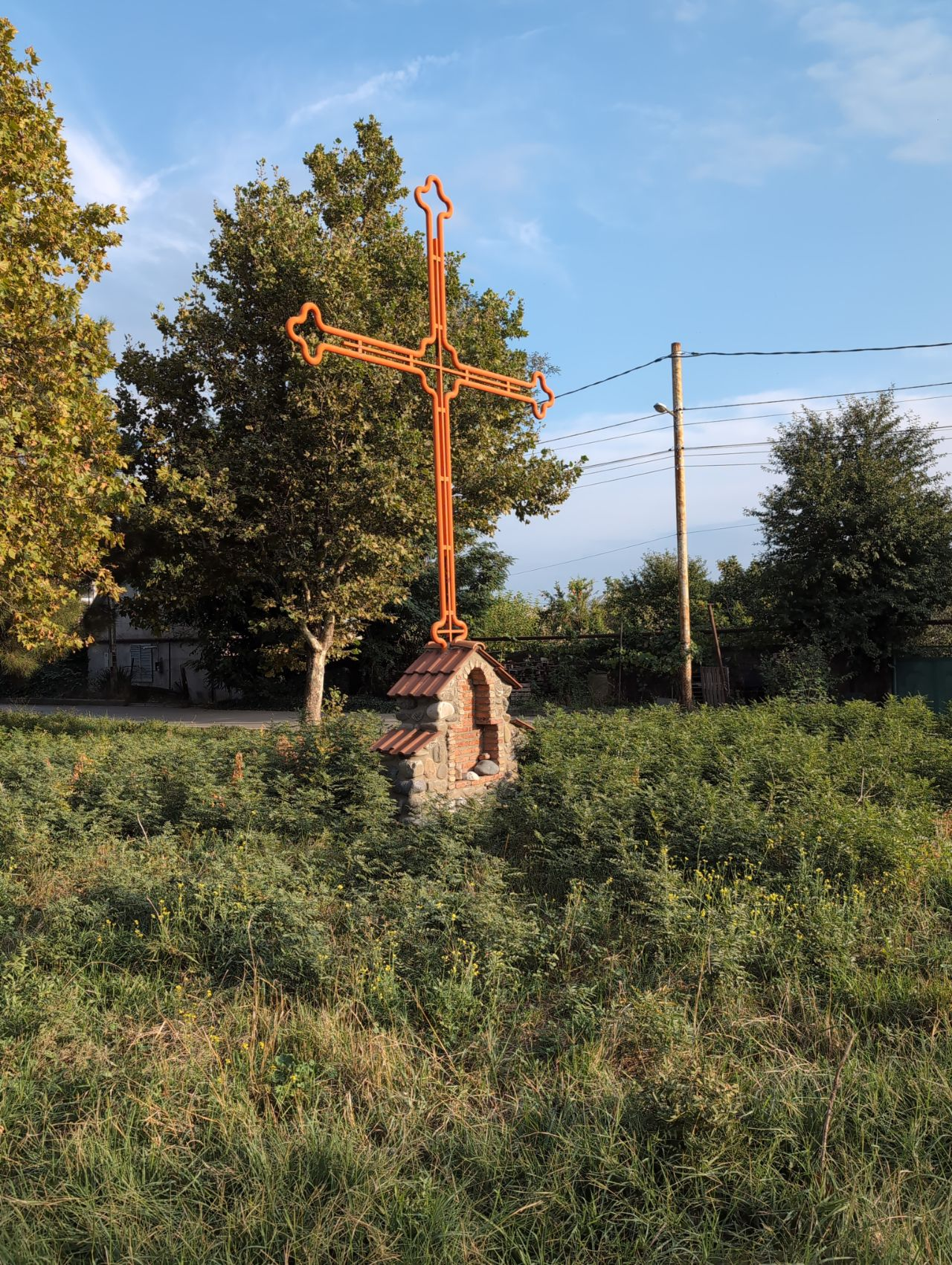
Wayside cross at Mukhadze Street

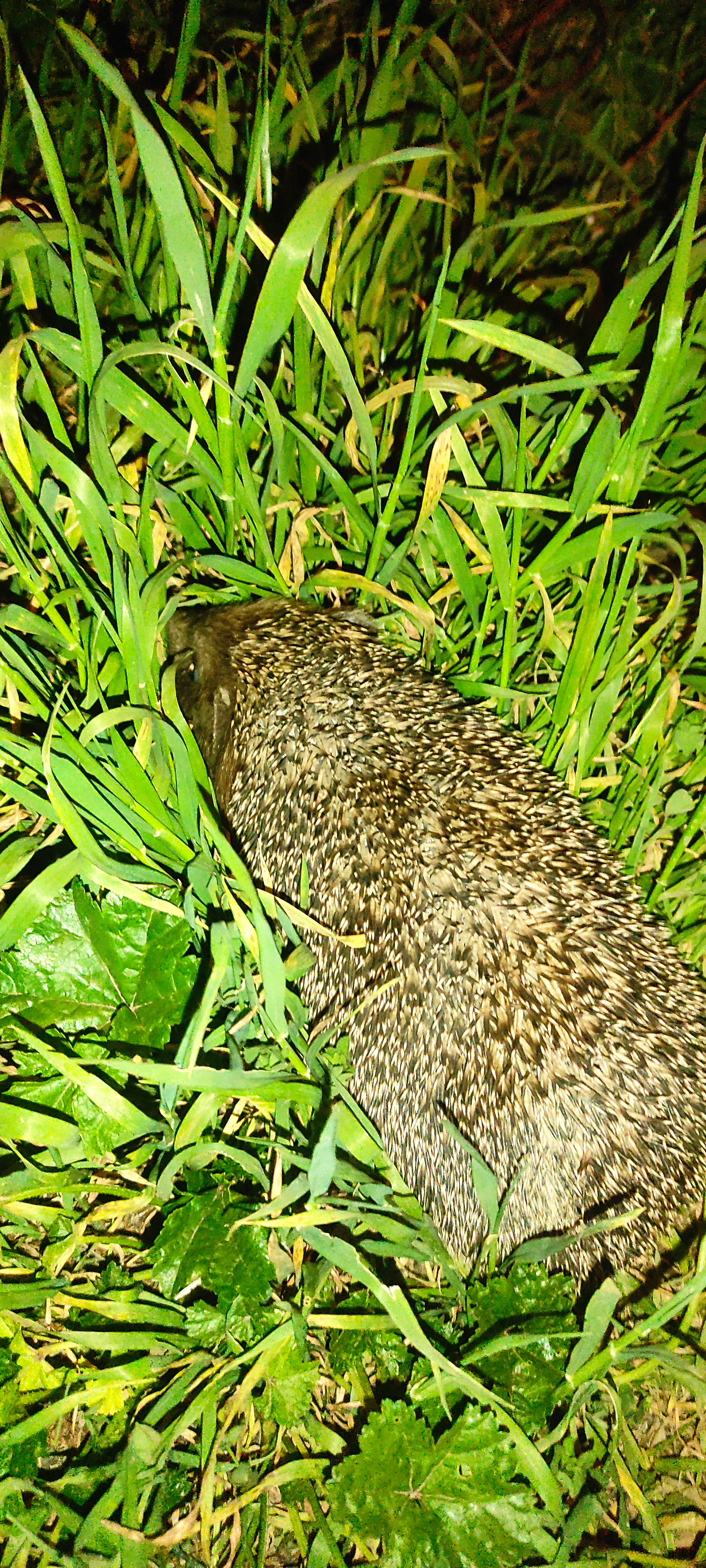
Southern white-breasted hedgehog near the Kakheti Highway in Orkhevi

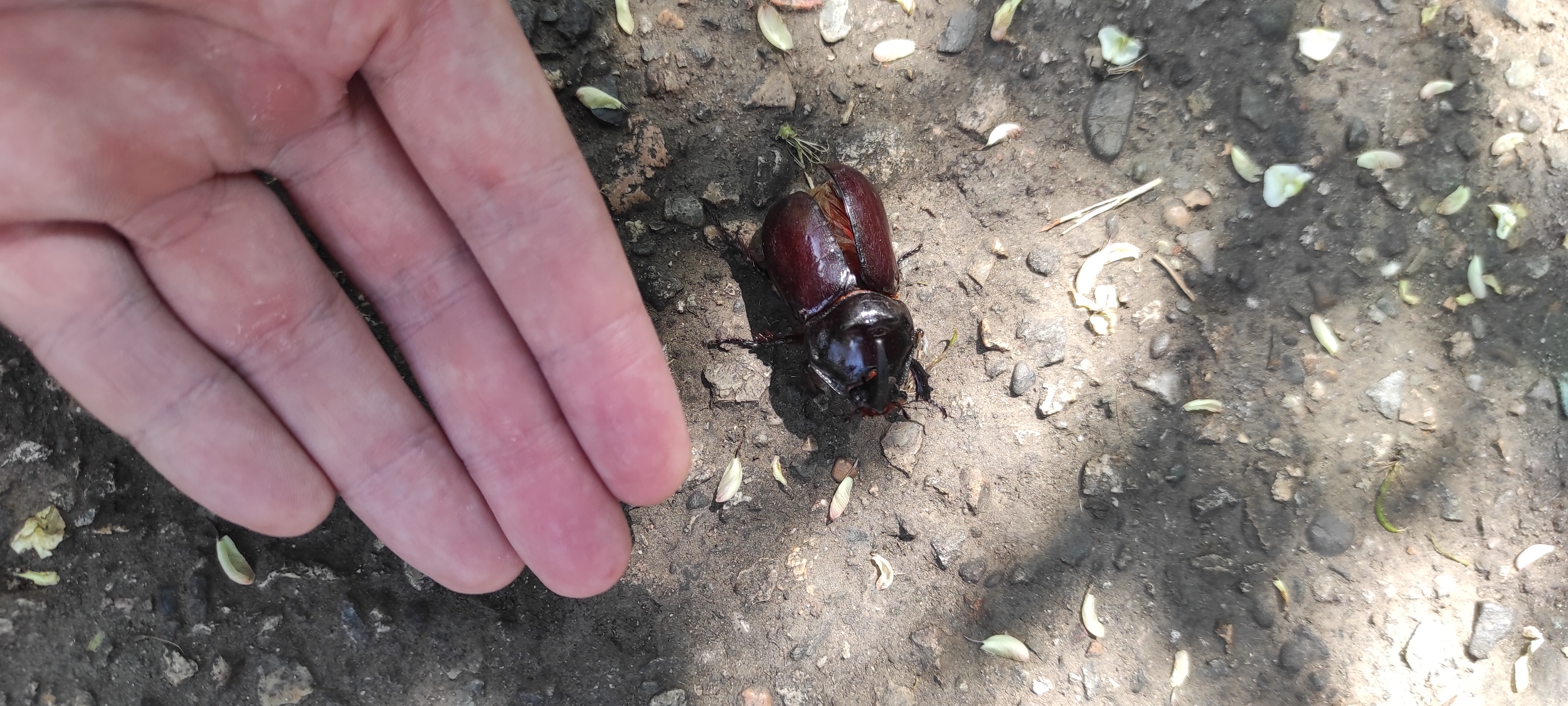
European rhinoceros beetle (male) near St. Nino Church

== Panoramic images 360 ==
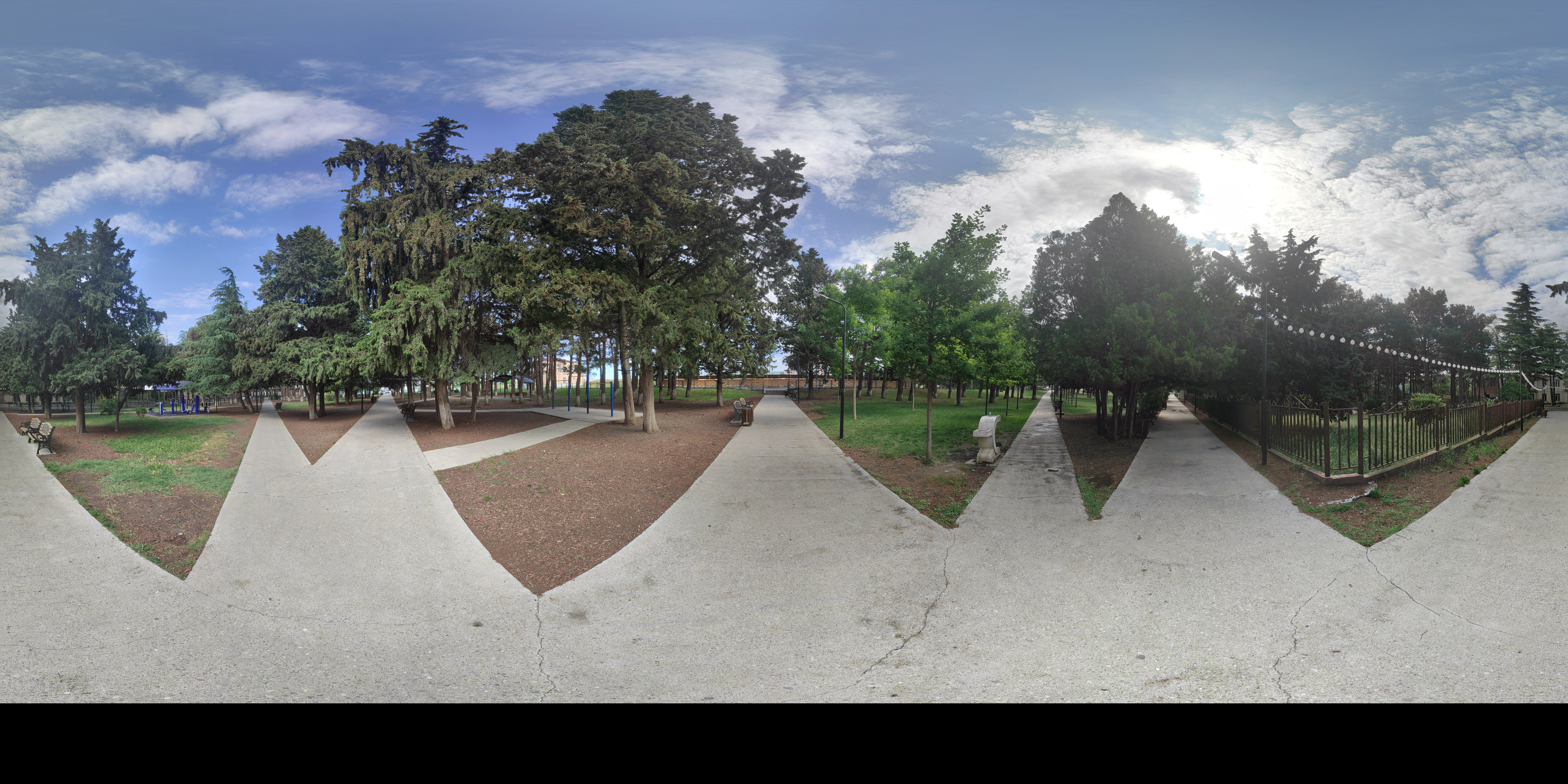
Orkhevi Central Park Pano (2023) (view as a 360° interactive panorama)

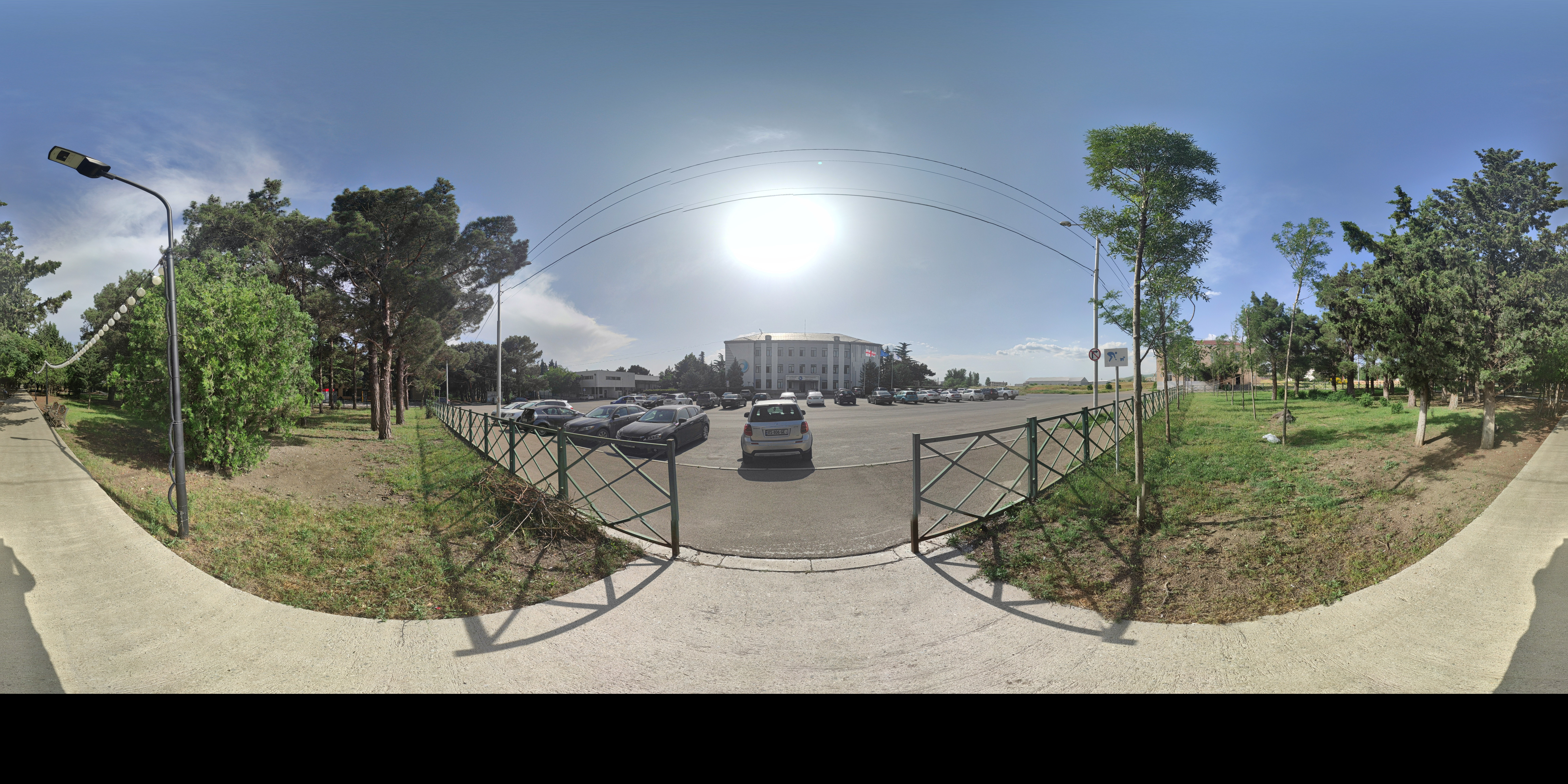
Orkhevi Central Park. Revenue Service view (2023) (view as a 360° interactive panorama)

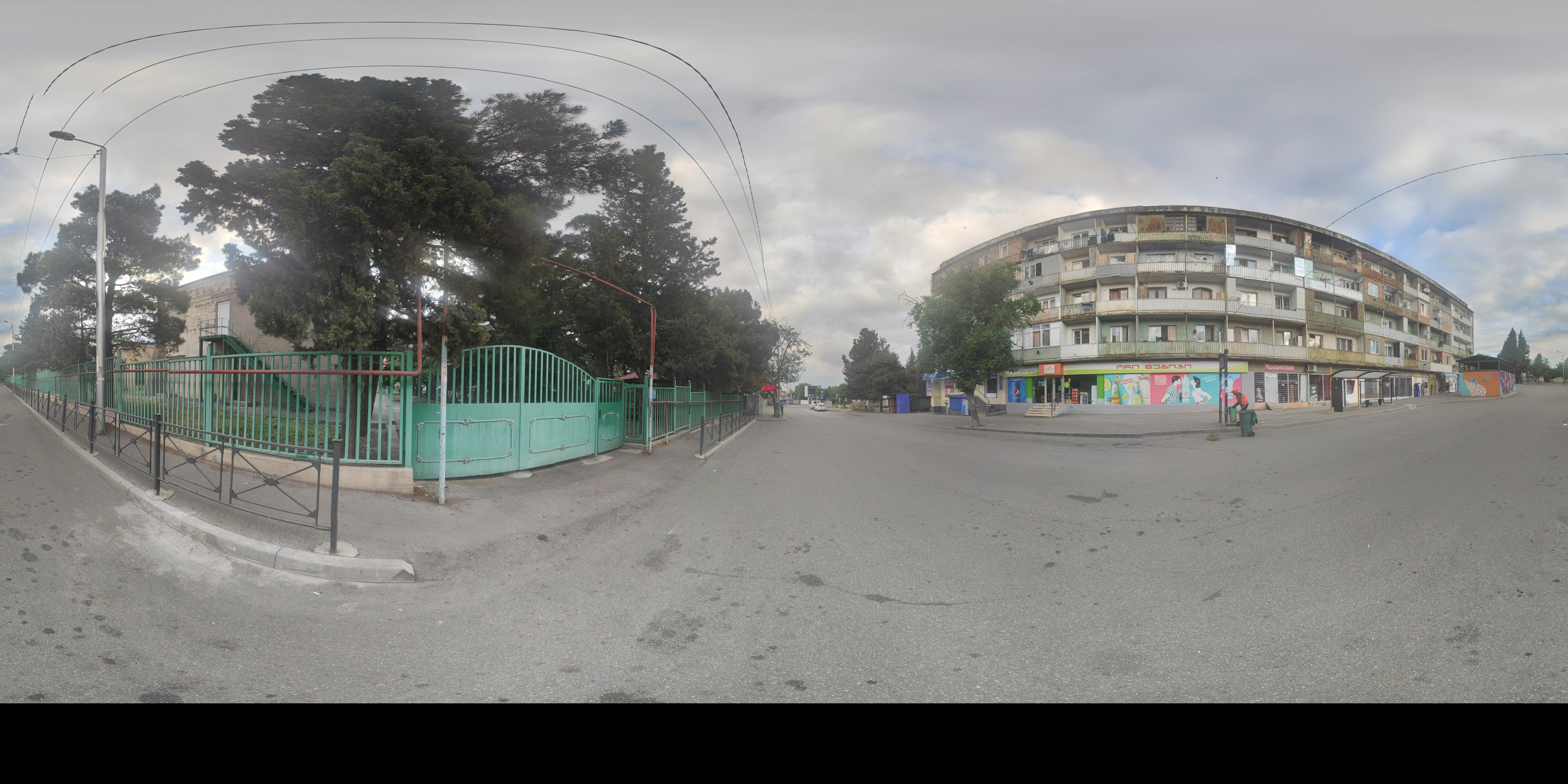
At Mukhadze Street (2023) (view as a 360° interactive panorama)

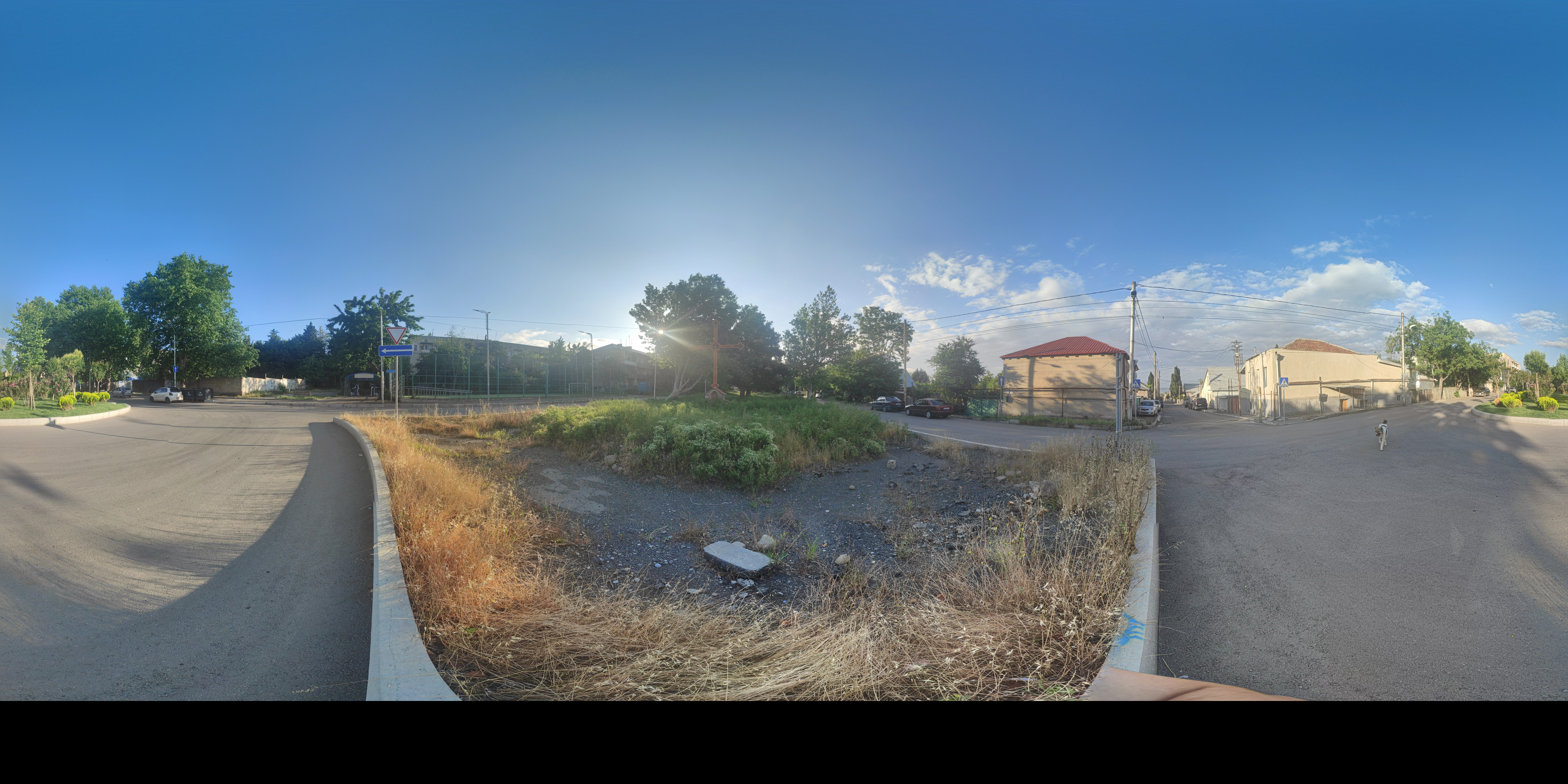
At Mukhadze Street. Near Vakhtang Pangani Football Pitch (2023) (view as a 360° interactive panorama)

== See also ==
- Orkhevi, Airport (microdistrict)
- Samgori District
- Tbilisi
- List of people from Tbilisi
- Georgia
