= Tetrikhevi =

Tetrikhevi is a toponym in Georgia and may refer to:

- Tetrikhevi (settlement in Tbilisi), a settlement within the Tbilisi city municipality, located west of the Tetrikhevhesi settlement.
- Tetrikhevhesi, a settlement in Tbilisi, located next to the eponymous HPP and east of the Tetrikhevi settlement.
- Tetrikhevi HPP, a hydro power plant located in the settlement of Tetrikhevhesi.
