= List of microdistricts of Tbilisi =

List of the 33 official microdistricts (ubans) in Tbilisi, Georgia

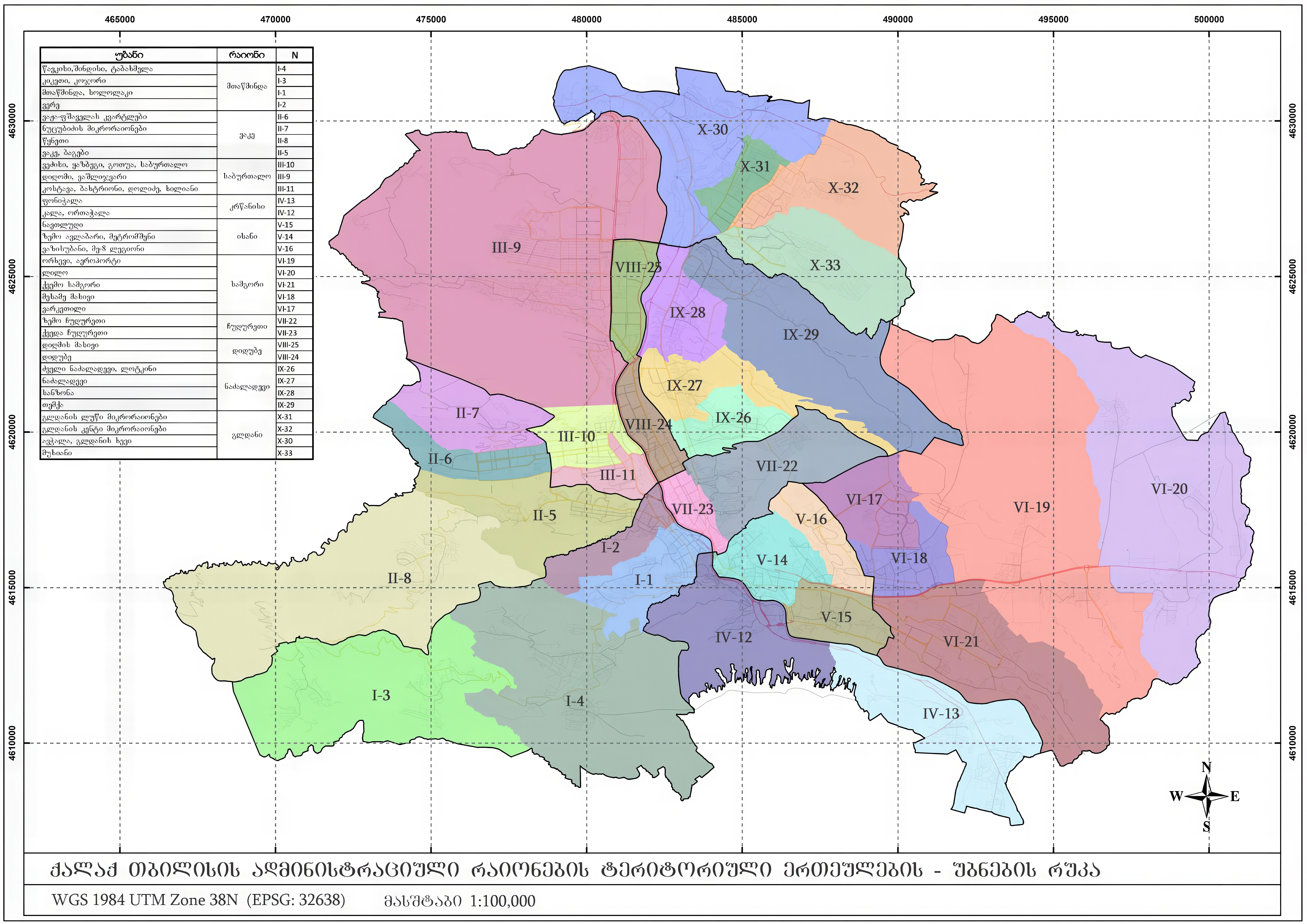
Map of the microdistricts (ubans) of Tbilisi, approved in 2014.

This is a list of the 33 official microdistricts (Georgian: უბანი, ubani; plural: ubnebi) of Tbilisi, the capital of Georgia.

The microdistricts were officially established as territorial units by a decree of the Tbilisi City Assembly (Sakrebulo) on December 9, 2014. The new administrative division was introduced to improve the accessibility of municipal services for residents.

== List of microdistricts by district ==
=== Mtatsminda (Georgian: მთაწმინდა) ===
- Mtatsminda-Sololaki (Georgian: მთაწმინდა, სოლოლაკი) (I-1)
- Vere (Georgian: ვერე) (I-2)
- Kiketi-Kojori (Georgian: კიკეთი, კოჯორი) (I-3)
- Tsavkisi-Shindisi-Tabakhmela (Georgian: წავკისი, შინდისი, ტაბახმელა) (I-4)

=== Vake (Georgian: ვაკე) ===
- Vake-Bagebi (Georgian: ვაკე, ბაგები) (II-5)
- Vazha-Pshavela Quarters (Georgian: ვაჟა-ფშაველას კვარტლები) (II-6)
- Nutsubidze Microdistricts (Georgian: ნუცუბიძის მიკრორაიონები) (II-7)
- Tskneti (Georgian: წყნეთი) (II-8)

=== Saburtalo (Georgian: საბურთალო) ===
- Dighomi-Vashlijvari (Georgian: დიღომი, ვაშლიჯვარი) (III-9)
- Vedzisi-Kazbegi-Gotua-Saburtalo (Georgian: ვეძისი, ყაზბეგი, გოთუა, საბურთალო) (III-10)
- Kostava-Bakhtrioni-Dolidze-Khiliani (Georgian: კოსტავა, ბახტრიონი, დოლიძე, ხილიანი) (III-11)

=== Krtsanisi (Georgian: კრწანისი) ===
- Kala-Ortachala (Georgian: კალა, ორთაჭალა) (IV-12)
- Ponichala (Georgian: ფონიჭალა) (IV-13)

=== Isani (Georgian: ისანი) ===
- Zemo Avlabari-Metromsheni (Georgian: ზემო ავლაბარი, მეტრომშენი) (V-14)
- Navtlughi (Georgian: ნავთლუღი) (V-15)
- Vazisubani-8th Legion (Georgian: ვაზისუბანი, მე-8 ლეგიონი) (V-16)

=== Samgori (Georgian: სამგორი) ===
- Varketili (Georgian: ვარკეთილი) (VI-17)
- Mesame Masivi (Georgian: მესამე მასივი) (VI-18)
- Orkhevi, Airport (Georgian: ორხევი, აეროპორტი) (VI-19)
- Lilo (Georgian: ლილო) (VI-20)
- Kvemo Samgori (Georgian: ქვემო სამგორი) (VI-21)

=== Chughureti (Georgian: ჩუღურეთი) ===
- Zemo Chughureti (Georgian: ზემო ჩუღურეთი) (VII-22)
- Kvemo Chughureti (Georgian: ქვედა ჩუღურეთი) (VII-23)

=== Didube (Georgian: დიდუბე) ===
- Didube (Georgian: დიდუბე) (VIII-24)
- Dighomi Massive (Georgian: დიღმის მასივი) (VIII-25)

=== Nadzaladevi (Georgian: ნაძალადევი) ===
- Dzveli Nadzaladevi-Lotkini (Georgian: ძველი ნაძალადევი, ლოტკინი) (IX-26)
- Nadzaladevi (Georgian: ნაძალადევი) (IX-27)
- Sanzona (Georgian: სანზონა) (IX-28)
- Temka (Georgian: თემქა) (IX-29)

=== Gldani (Georgian: გლდანი) ===
- Avchala-Gldani Ravine (Georgian: ავჭალა, გლდანის ხევი) (X-30)
- Gldani Even Microdistricts (Georgian: გლდანის ლუწი მიკრორაიონები) (X-31)
- Gldani Odd Microdistricts (Georgian: გლდანის კენტი მიკრორაიონები) (X-32)
- Mukhiani (Georgian: მუხიანი) (X-33)
