= Orkhevi =

Orkhevi is a Georgian toponym and may refer to:

== Geographical locations ==
- Orkhevi (settlement in Tbilisi), a settlement and microdistrict within Tbilisi, the capital of Georgia.
- Orkhevi (village), a village in Tianeti Municipality, Mtskheta-Mtianeti, Georgia.
- Orkhevi (river), a river in Tbilisi and a left tributary of the Kura.
- Orkhevi, Airport, a microdistrict No 19 in Tbilisi, the capital of Georgia.

== Mentions in literature ==
- The toponym is mentioned in the novel Dawn of Colchis (1933) by Konstantine Lortkipanidze. The context of the novel suggests a location in Western Georgia (in the area of modern Khoni Municipality) and should not be confused with the similarly named locations in Eastern Georgia.
- A 1958 review in the Moscow newspaper Literaturnaya Gazeta of a novel by Tina Donzhashvili mentions an "Orkhevi kolkhoz" (collective farm). The context, which also refers to the villages of Mukhiani and Shilda, places it in Gurjaani Municipality in the Kakheti region, distinct from the locations in Tbilisi or Tianeti.
