= Tetrikhevhesi =

Suburb of Tbilisi, Georgia

Tetrikhevhesi თეთრიხევჰესი
- Settlement, suburb
- Tetrikhevi HPP Settlement

Georgian transcription(s)
  - Official romanization: Tetrikhevhesi
  - Official romanization (formal): Tetrikhevis Hesis dasakhleba
  - IPA: pronounced [tʰɛtʰɾixɛvhɛsi]
  - IPA (formal): pronounced [tʰɛtʰɾixɛvis hɛsis dasaxlɛba]
- Etymology: From the Tetrikhevi river and the acronym for HPP.
- Interactive map of Tetrikhevhesi
- Location of Tetrikhevhesi in Georgia
- Coordinates: 41.702534°N 44.932945°E
- Country: Georgia
- Capital city: Tbilisi
- District: Samgori District
- Microdistrict (Uban): No 19 "Orkhevi, Airport"
- Founded: 1950
- Named for: Tetrikhevi HPP

Area
  - Total: 0.54 km^{2} (0.21 sq mi)
- Elevation: 565 m (1,854 ft)
- Time zone: UTC+04:00 (Georgia Time)
- Postal code: 0190

Tetrikhevhesi (Georgian: თეთრიხევჰესი, pronounced [tʰɛtʰɾixɛvhɛsi]) is the common name for the Tetrikhevi Hydroelectric Power Plant Settlement (Georgian: თეთრიხევის ჰესის დასახლება, pronounced [tʰɛtʰɾixɛvis hɛsis dasaxlɛba]), a settlement (dasakhleba) and suburb in the Samgori District of Tbilisi, Georgia. Located in the eastern part of the city, it lies north of the Orkhevi settlement and west of the Tetrikhevi settlement, on the Samgori Plain. It was founded in the early 1950s as a workers' settlement for the builders and staff of the eponymous hydroelectric power plant, a part of the Samgori irrigation system cascade. The history and daily life of the settlement are inextricably linked to the operation of this HPP, which has shaped its unique character over the decades.

The settlement's name, a portmanteau toponym, is derived from the hydronym Tetri-Khevi (Georgian for "White Ravine") and the acronym "HPP". Historical sources emphasize the need to distinguish it from the neighboring settlement of Tetrikhevi, with which it was often confused, leading to domestic mix-ups recorded in the press.

During the Soviet period, Tetrikhevhesi was built by the Gruzgidrostroy trust on previously undeveloped land and quickly became a well-maintained "green oasis." With the dissolution of the Soviet Union, the settlement underwent economic transformations, highlighted by the privatization of its core enterprise, the HPP. In the post-Soviet era, residents faced both the typical hardships of the period and new challenges, including environmental risks associated with its proximity to a mudflow-prone ravine. Today, Tetrikhevhesi remains a residential area whose infrastructure is closely tied to the power plant that gave it life.

== Etymology ==
The name of the settlement is a portmanteau toponym formed from a hydronym and a technical term:

- Tetri-Khevi (Georgian: თეთრი ხევი): From Georgian, meaning "White Ravine" or "White Gully." This is the name of the river (a dry ravine) where the hydroelectric power station was built.
- HPP: An acronym for "hydroelectric power plant."

Despite the similar names, Tetrikhevhesi should be distinguished from the neighboring settlement of Tetri-Khevi. Sources from the Soviet and post-Soviet periods often mention them as separate administrative units. The distinction is clearly illustrated by an incident described in 2001 by the newspaper Svobodnaya Gruziya: a repair crew mistakenly laid a telephone cable intended for residents of Tetrikhevhesi in the neighboring Tetri-Khevi settlement.

== Geography ==
The settlement is located on the eastern outskirts of Tbilisi, in the Samgori District. It is situated north of the Orkhevi settlement and west of the Tetri-Khevi settlement, on the Samgori Plain.

=== Geological risks ===
The settlement's territory adjoins the Tetri-Khevi river ravine. According to a 2019 report by the National Environment Agency of Georgia, the Tetri-Khevi river is classified as a watercourse with a medium risk of forming mudflows (Georgian: ღვარცოფი, ghvarts'opi). As preventive measures to protect infrastructure, the report recommended periodic cleaning and deepening of the riverbed, as well as continuous monitoring of the ravine's condition.

== Administrative status ==
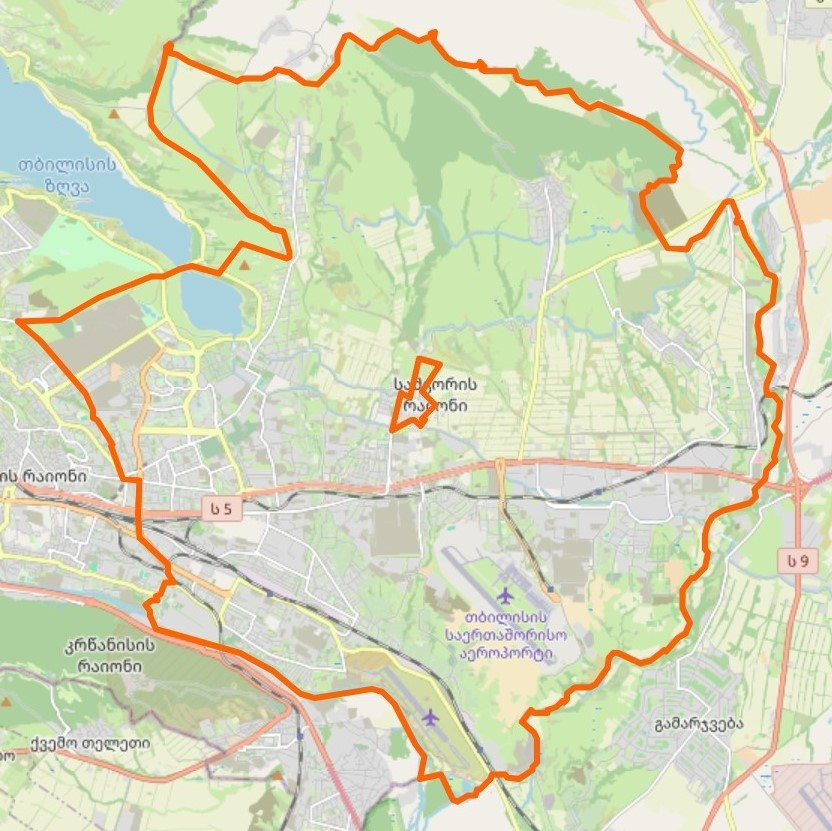
Tetrikhevhesi (highlighted) within the borders of Samgori District.

Currently, Tetrikhevhesi is administratively part of the Samgori District of Tbilisi. According to a municipal decree from December 9, 2014, Tetrikhevhesi, along with the neighboring settlements of Orkhevi and Airport and adjacent territories, forms a single administrative uban (microdistrict) No. 19, named "Orkhevi, Airport".

Throughout the Soviet period, the settlement was also part of Tbilisi and was included in various districts. In electoral lists, it was successively mentioned as part of the Gareubani district (1954) and later the Zavodskoy district (1979, 1989).

== History ==
=== Soviet period ===
The construction of the Samgori irrigation system, which was of great national economic importance, began after World War II. The settlement for the workers of the Tetrikhevi HPP was founded in 1950 by the Gruzgidrostroy trust, under the leadership of Stalin Prize laureate G. Maevsky. On a previously barren plot, prefabricated and permanent three-apartment houses were erected. In 1952, the executive committee of the Tbilisi City Council officially allocated land plots for the new settlement.

The settlement was quickly developed and transformed into a "green oasis" in the middle of the steppe. In a 1957 article, journalist Giorgi Shatberashvili described well-tended yards with gardens and vineyards belonging to the first residents. Among them, he mentioned the family of Ioseb Guramishvili and his wife Tamar, who worked as the chief economist at the Upper Samgori irrigation system administration. They had settled there in 1951 in a still-unfinished house. For contrast, the article mentions a photograph from the magazine Ogoniok that captured the same yard during its initial construction phase. According to specialized sources, the settlement was originally created as a "permanent settlement for the station's service personnel."

=== Post-Soviet period ===
In the 1990s, during a period of economic reforms, the Tetrikhevi HPP was privatized, which directly affected the residents of the settlement. In March 1995, the station, which was not operational at the time, was sold to its labor collective through a direct sale. An investment of 348,000 lari was made for its rehabilitation, allowing it to resume operations. After its restoration, the station employed 23 people, and the average salary in 1997 was 206 lari. Electricity generation increased from 3.7 million kWh in 1995 to 26 million kWh in 1997.

During the same period, other enterprises were also located in the settlement. For instance, in 1996, the joint-stock company Vertsi, a primary wool processing factory, was registered at the address "Tbilisi, Tetri-Khevi, HPP settlement".

In the early 2000s, residents faced domestic problems typical of the period. In 2001, telephone service in the settlement was lost for five months due to the theft of 600 meters of cable. The article on this incident noted that most residents were "elderly people, and there are many large families," and the lack of communication posed risks, including for the operational work of the HPP itself.

The settlement's housing consists exclusively of private homes with garden plots and industrial facilities; there are no multi-apartment buildings.

== Infrastructure and economy ==
=== Transport ===
In 2016, at the initiative of a majoritarian member of the Sakrebulo (City Council), a new marshrutka route, No. 107, was launched. It connected Tetrikhevhesi (referred to as "Tetri-Khevi" in the route description) with key transport hubs in the district, including the "Isani" and "Samgori" metro stations, via the Kakheti Highway. However, today the only public transport route serving the settlement is bus No. 356, which runs from Tetrikhevhesi, through Tetri-Khevi along Chantladze Street, through the main roads of Orkhevi, and to the Isani metro station. In 2019, new comfortable Isuzu buses, equipped with air conditioning and adapted for people with disabilities, were introduced on this route (then numbered 56).

=== Energy ===
The life of the settlement is historically and inextricably linked with the Tetrikhevi Hydroelectric Power Plant. The station is part of the Samgori HPP cascade and was fully automated from its design phase, which allowed for a special work regime, including "one person on duty at home." In 2000, the station's electricity generation amounted to 13.4 million kWh.

=== Enterprises ===
The settlement serves as the legal address for several commercial organizations. As of 2024, LLC "MPG Construction" was registered at the address "Tetrikhevi HPP settlement, No. 5".
