= Tetrikhevi (settlement in Tbilisi) =

Suburb of Tbilisi, Georgia

Tetrikhevi თეთრიხევის დასახლება
- Settlement, suburb
- Tetrikhevi Settlement

Georgian transcription(s)
  - Official romanization: Tetrikhevi
  - Official romanization (formal): Tetrikhevis dasakhleba
  - IPA: pronounced [tʰɛtʰriχɛvi]
  - IPA (formal): pronounced [tʰɛtʰriχɛvis dasaxlɛba]
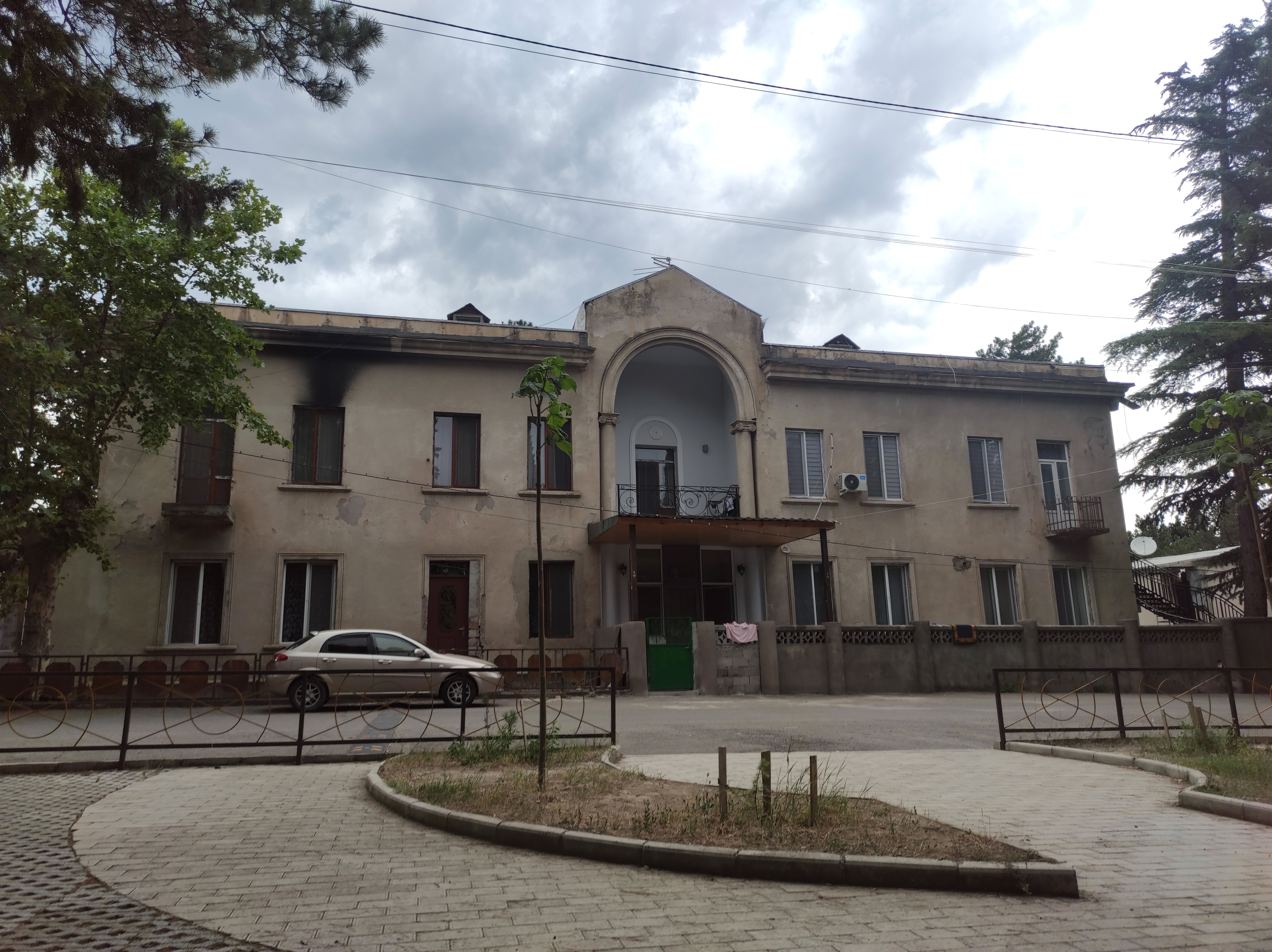
- Building at 3 Samgori II lane in Tetrikhevi, Tbilisi
- Etymology: From the Tetrikhevi river, meaning "White Ravine" or "White Gorge."
- Interactive map of Tetrikhevi
- Location of Tetrikhevi in Georgia
- Coordinates: 41.703919°N 44.927478°E
- Country: Georgia
- Capital city: Tbilisi
- District: Samgori District
- Microdistrict (Uban): No 19 "Orkhevi, Airport"
- Founded: 1950
- Named for: Tetrikhevi river

Area
  - Total: 0.62 km^{2} (0.24 sq mi)
- Elevation: 564 m (1,850 ft)
- Demonym: Tetrikhevian(s)
- Time zone: UTC+04:00 (Georgia Time)
- Postal code: 0190

Tetrikhevi (Georgian: თეთრიხევი) is a settlement and suburb within the Samgori District of Tbilisi, Georgia. Located in the eastern part of the city, north of the Orkhevi settlement on the Samgori Plain, it was founded in the early 1950s as a community for the builders and workers of the Samgori irrigation system and its associated hydroelectric power station.

== Etymology ==
The settlement's name originates from the eponymous Tetrikhevi river (9 km long). In Georgian, Georgian: თეთრი ხევი translates to "White Ravine" or "White Gorge." According to a 1978 toponymic dictionary, the upper course of the river was known as Orkhevi.

== History ==
=== Soviet period ===
The settlement's founding was part of one of the largest projects of the post-war five-year plan in the Georgian SSR—the construction of the Samgori irrigation system. The project aimed to irrigate tens of thousands of hectares of arid land east of Tbilisi to create a new agricultural base. The reclaimed land was planned to host 7,500 hectares of fruit orchards, 5,000 hectares of vineyards, an equal area for melons and vegetable gardens, and 18,200 hectares for grain and cotton. As part of this project, a cascade of three hydroelectric power stations was planned, one of which was to be located near the village of Tetrikhevi.

In 1950, builders from the Gruzgidrostroy trust arrived at a location described by the press as a "white spot" in the arid Samgori steppe and founded the settlement. The first residents included both construction workers and collective farmers from various regions of Georgia (Kaspi, Dmanisi, Gardabani), who learned new trades such as carpentry, concrete work, and metalworking, becoming Stakhanovites in the process. Families began moving into the still-unfinished houses in 1951. With water supplied from the Samgori canal, residents planted their own gardens with cherries, plums, apples, and peaches, as well as vineyards and vegetable plots, transforming the arid land into what contemporaries called a "green oasis."

In September 1952, the executive committee of the Tbilisi City Soviet of Working People's Deputies officially allocated land for the new settlements of Tetrikhevi and Vaziani. The settlement was integrated into the city limits and, over the decades, was part of various districts of Tbilisi: Gareubani (1954), Zavodskoy (1979), and Samgori (since the late 1980s).

=== Post-Soviet period ===
During the 1990s and 2000s, the settlement faced infrastructure problems typical of the era. In 2001, the newspaper Svobodnaya Gruziya reported that residents of the neighboring Tetrikhevi HPP settlement had been without telephone service for five months due to cable theft. The article noted that the community had many elderly residents and large families, and transportation was difficult.

In August 2016, a new minibus route, No. 107, was launched, improving transportation access for Tetrikhevi and connecting it to the city's transport hubs, including the "Isani" and "Samgori" metro stations.

In April 2024, an incident in the settlement attracted media attention when several cows were electrocuted and died after a power line snapped during strong winds.

== Geography ==
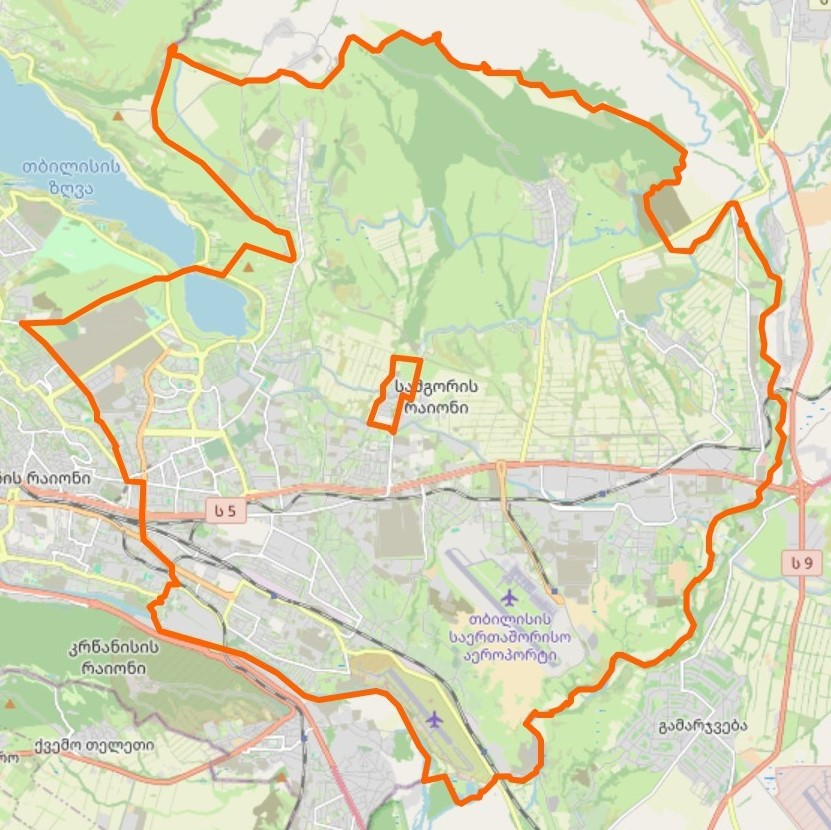
Tetrikhevi (highlighted) within the borders of Samgori District.

Tetrikhevi is located in the Samgori District of Tbilisi, on the Samgori Plain. The Tetrikhevi river flows through the settlement and empties into the Lower Samgori Canal near the Samgori settlement. According to a 2019 report by the National Environmental Agency, the river is prone to mudflows (Georgian: ღვარცოფი), which poses a medium-level risk to nearby infrastructure.

== Infrastructure ==
The primary industrial enterprise for the area is the Tetrikhevi HPP, one of the three hydroelectric power stations of the Samgori cascade, which was commissioned in 1952. The station was one of the first in Georgia to be privatized through direct sale in the early 1990s.

The primary mode of public transport was the route taxi (marshrutka) No. 107, which connected the settlement to the Orkhevi, Isani, and Samgori areas via Chantladze and Mukhadze streets, Kakheti Highway, and Moscow Avenue. However, the sole public transport route currently serving the settlement is bus No. 356. This route starts at the Tetrikhevhesi Settlement, passes through Tetrikhevi along Chantladze Street, continues through the main roads of the Orkhevi Settlement, and terminates at the Isani metro station. In 2019, new comfortable Isuzu buses, equipped with air conditioning and adapted for people with disabilities, were introduced on this route (then numbered 56).

=== Modern Enterprises ===
- Bedegi — a plant for the production of building materials, located at 6 Brother Slovinski Street.
