= Orkhevi, Airport (microdistrict) =

Microdistrict in Samgori District, Tbilisi, Georgia

Orkhevi, Airport ორხევი, აეროპორტი
- Microdistrict (Uban)
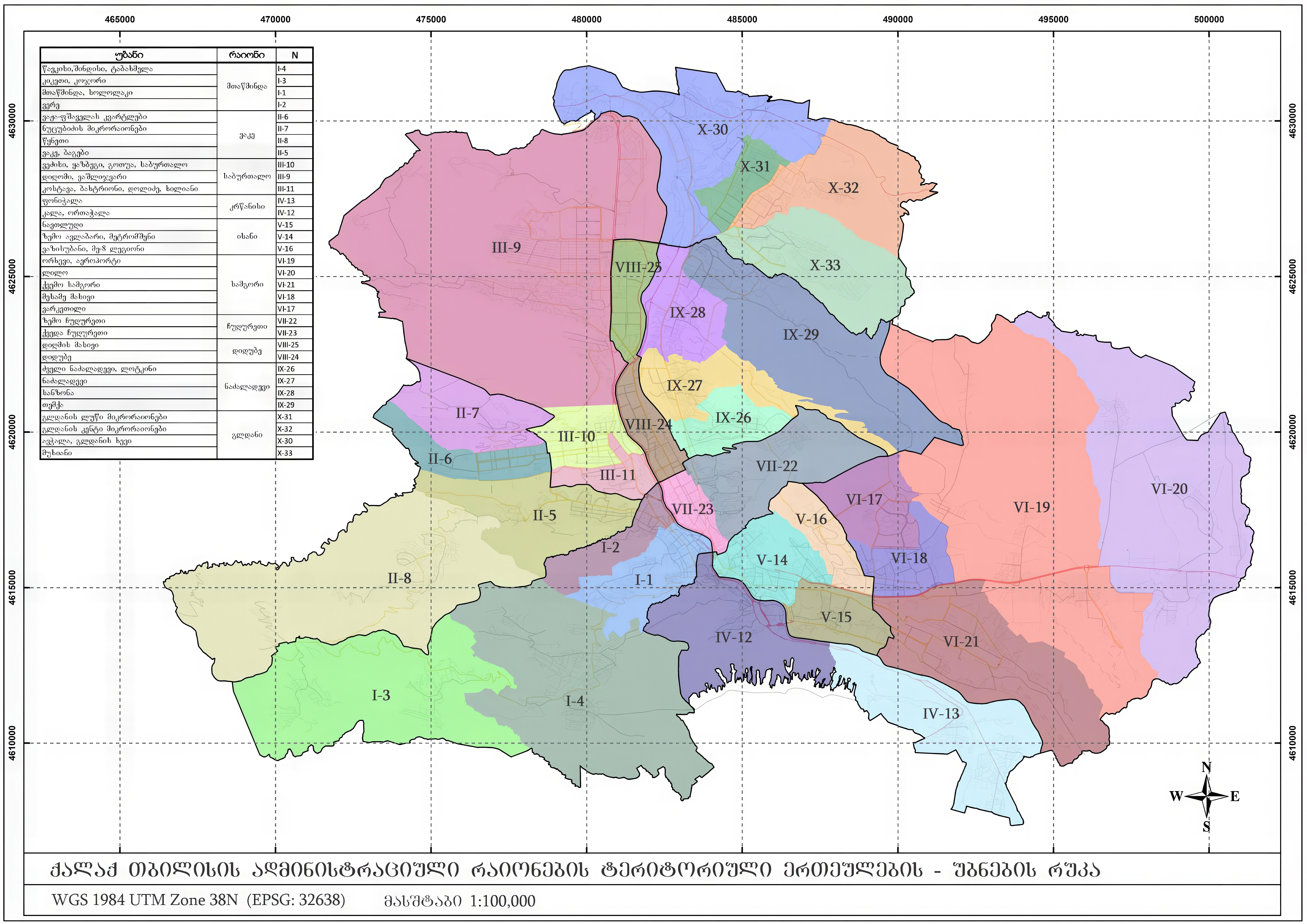
- The "Orkhevi, Airport" microdistrict (highlighted) within the Samgori District of Tbilisi.
- Location of Orkhevi, Airport within Tbilisi.
- Country: Georgia
- City: Tbilisi
- District: Samgori District
- Established: 2014
- First mentioned: 2009

Orkhevi, Airport (Georgian: ორხევი, აეროპორტი) is the 19th microdistrict (uban) of the Samgori District in Tbilisi, the capital of Georgia. It is a large administrative area covering the settlements of Orkhevi, the area around Tbilisi International Airport, and parts of Didi Lilo.

== Administrative status ==
The microdistrict, formally named "Microdistrict No. 19 'Orkhevi, Airport'" (Georgian: უბანი 19 – ორხევი, აეროპორტი), was first mentioned as a planned territorial unit in a 2009 publication detailing the administrative reorganization of the capital. It was officially established by a decree of the Tbilisi City Municipality Assembly on December 9, 2014. This decree formally defined the boundaries of the new territorial units (ubans) within the city's districts, including Samgori.

== Geography ==
=== Boundaries ===
According to the 2014 municipal decree, the boundary of Microdistrict No. 19 is defined as follows:

The border begins at the intersection of Kakheti Highway and Tvalchrelidze Street and proceeds north to the end of Tvalchrelidze Street. It then turns northwest, following a road along the left bank of the Lower Samgori Canal to the end of Javakheti Street. From there, it connects to the bypass road around the Tbilisi Sea. An imaginary line crosses the reservoir's narrow gorge, rejoins the bypass road, and follows its axis eastward for 0.5 km. The boundary then turns north for 0.5 km, then east for 1 km, connecting with the road leading to Mali Lilo (Small Lilo) until it intersects with the railway bypass.

The boundary then follows the railway to the northwest and north, crosses the Kvirikobi Ravine, turns right, and follows the administrative border of Tbilisi until it meets the road connecting Didi Lilo (Big Lilo) and Tsitelubani. It then turns southeast along this road to Didi Lilo, where it enters the Mchamela Ravine. The border follows this ravine south to the Tsivtskaliskali River, continues along the river for 2,400 meters, crosses the road connecting Didi Lilo, and reaches the Kakheti Highway. It follows the highway east for 400 meters, then turns south along Yumashev Street to its intersection with Rustaveli Street.

From there, the boundary continues south along Rustaveli Street to its end, then follows the Liloskali River to the border of the Isani-Samgori administrative district. It proceeds south along the Lochini River for 2,700 meters. Finally, the boundary heads northeast along the existing road network to Kiziki Street, follows it west for 200 meters, and then turns north along a road that connects back to the Kakheti Highway, returning to the starting point at Tvalchrelidze Street.

== Administration ==
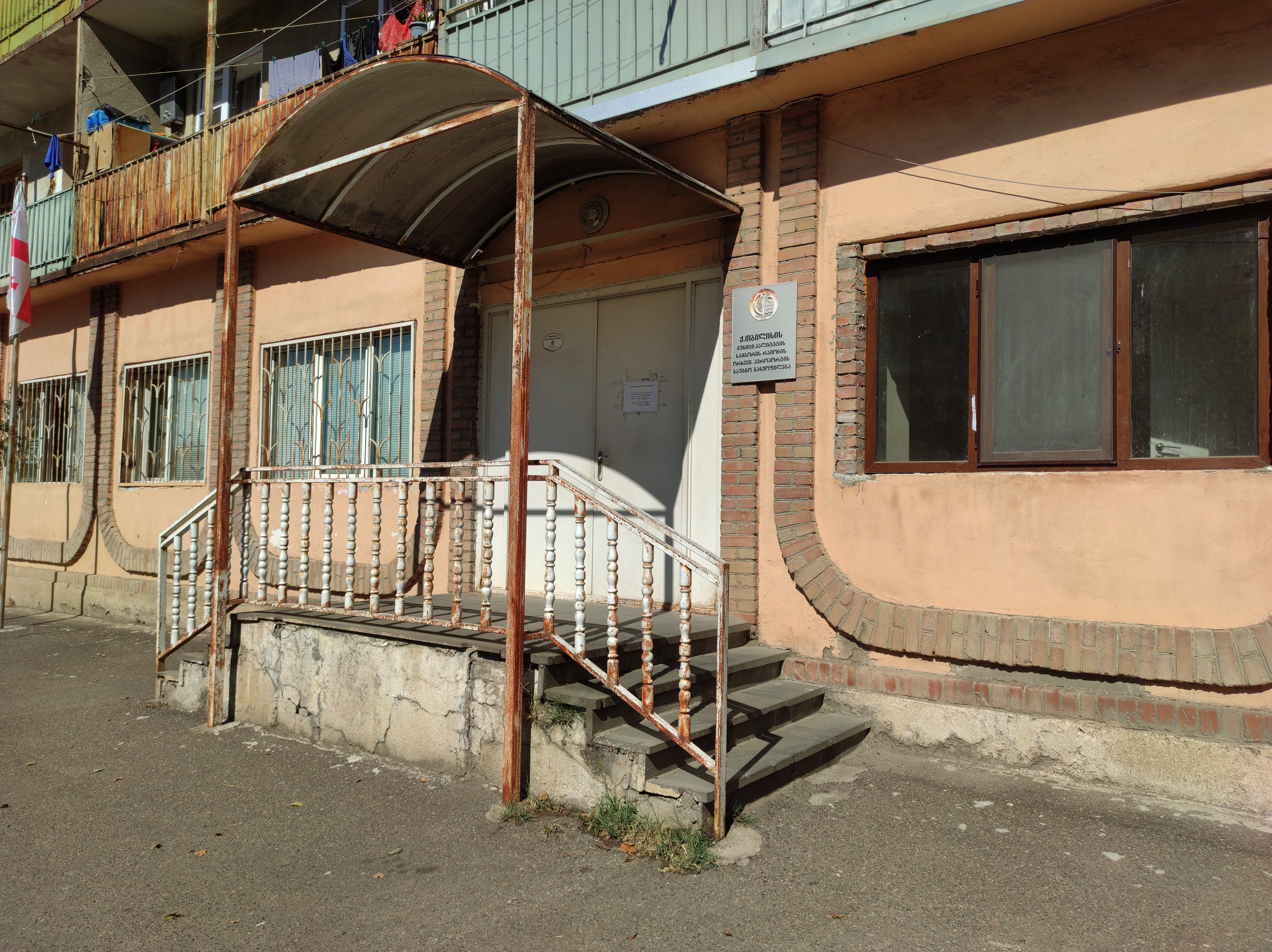
The entrance to the office of the Orkhevi, Airport administration of the Samgori district in Tbilisi

The administration department for the Orkhevi, Airport microdistrict of the Samgori District is located at 6 Giorgi Mukhadze Street, Orkhevi Settlement, Tbilisi.
