= Tetrikhevi HPP =

Hydroelectric power station in Tbilisi, Georgia

Tetrikhevi Hydroelectric Power Station
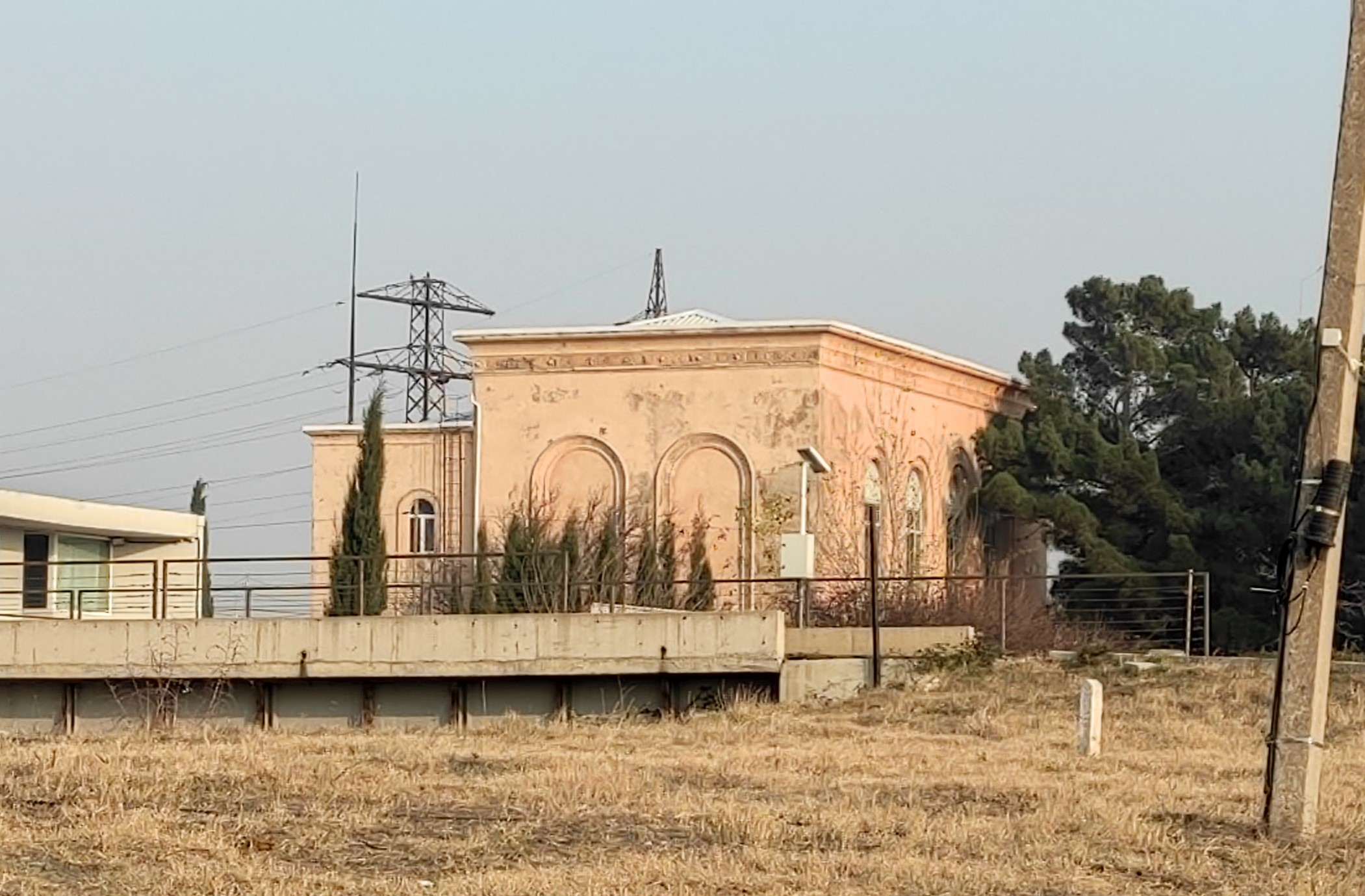
- The powerhouse of the Tetrikhevi HPP

- Location within Georgia
- Location of the HPP, with the water intake and penstock to the north, and the main powerhouse and substation to the south.
- Official name: Georgian: თეთრიხევის ჰესი
- Country: Georgia
- Location: Tetrikhevi, Tbilisi
- Coordinates: 41.7049°N 44.9328°E
- Purpose: Power, Irrigation
- Status: Operational
- Construction began: 1947
- Opening date: 1955
- Built by: "Gruzgidrostroy" trust
- Designed by: "Gidroenergoproekt" institute (Tbilisi branch)
- Owner: Georgian Water and Power
- Operator: Georgian Water and Power

Dam and spillways
- Impounds: Upper Samgori Main Canal

Reservoir
- Creates: Sioni Reservoir (primary source)
- Total capacity: 300×10^{6} m^{3} 240,000 acre⋅ft(useful capacity)
- Catchment area: Iori River

Tetrikhevi HPP
- Commission date: 1955
- Type: Conventional
- Hydraulic head: 109.66 m (360 ft)
- Turbines: 2 × Hydro-units: • Francis turbines (F15-VM-140) • Generators (VGS-260-70-12)
- Installed capacity: 13.6 MW (Note: Other sources provide different figures. The book History of the Electric Power Industry of Georgia states a total capacity of 13.6 thousand kW (13.6 MW) for the two units, while the newspaper Svobodnaya Gruziya reported 13 MW in 1998. The 2014 ESIA report lists a design capacity of 12,000 kW and an installed capacity of 14,000 kW for the two units, and the EnergyOnline.ge portal cited 12 MW in 2009.)
- Annual generation: 25–30 GWh
- Part of the Samgori cascade. Serves as a training base for the Georgian Technical University.

Tetrikhevi Hydroelectric Power Station (Georgian: თეთრიხევის ჰესი) is a hydroelectric power station in Georgia, the third and final stage of the Samgori cascade, located on the Upper Samgori Main Canal on the eastern outskirts of Tbilisi in the settlement of Tetrikhevhesi (Note: In the Soviet press, the settlement was also referred to as "Tetri-Khevi," "settlement of the Tetrikhevi HPP," and "Tetrikhevi."). It is a key element of the Samgori irrigation and energy system, created in the post-war years to irrigate arid lands and generate electricity. The station is also notable for its status as an active training and laboratory base for power engineering students from the Georgian Technical University.

Construction of the station was carried out as part of the "people's construction" of the Samgori system starting in 1947; the Tetrikhevi HPP was put into permanent operation in 1955. In 1995, the station was privatized by its workforce, which enabled its rehabilitation and a significant increase in electricity generation. The current owner is Georgian Water and Power. By design, it is a diversionary, canal-type HPP. The installed capacity of the station is 13.6 MW. The powerhouse contains two hydro-units with Francis turbines, operating at a design head of approximately 110 meters. A distinctive feature of the Tetrikhevi HPP's operation, like the entire cascade, is its seasonal regime: during the winter, the station generates peak electricity by transferring water from the Sioni Reservoir to the Tbilisi Reservoir, while in the summer, the stored water is used for irrigation.

== Project background ==
The Tetrikhevi HPP is an integral part of the Samgori irrigation system, one of Georgia's largest land reclamation projects, implemented in the post-war years. The project's goal was to irrigate 70,000 hectares of arid land in the Samgori Steppe east of Tbilisi, which historical accounts noted was "an ancient dream of the Georgian people." The Samgori Steppe is a hilly plain at an altitude of 300–1,100 m above sea level with an arid climate: the average maximum temperature reaches 28–31 °C (absolute maximum 40 °C), and the average annual precipitation is only 424 mm, making agriculture impossible without artificial irrigation. To address this, a comprehensive scheme was developed to utilize the flow of the mountain river Iori.

The system is based on the interaction of two key hydraulic structures:

- The Sioni Reservoir is a multi-year regulating reservoir on the Iori River with a useful capacity of 300 million m³, accumulating water for subsequent use.
- The Tbilisi Reservoir (the so-called "Tbilisi Sea") is a buffer reservoir created on November 4, 1951, in a basin of salt lakes (Kuki, Ilguniani, and Avlabari) for irrigation and water supply to Tbilisi. Its creation in close proximity to the city was recognized as an original solution, allowing the reservoir to also be used for recreation, sports, and sailing events.

These two reservoirs are connected by the 41.6 km long Upper Samgori Main Canal. To draw water from the Iori River near the village of Paldo, headworks were built, including a low-head concrete dam and a three-chamber settling basin to remove sediment. The canal itself is a complex engineering structure, incorporating "almost all types of hydraulic structures: tunnels, galleries, aqueducts, siphons, and canal-bridges." A cascade of three diversion HPPs with a total installed capacity of 31.4 MW was built along the natural elevation drops of the canal:

- Satkhenisi HPP (128 m head)
- Martkopi HPP (35 m head)
- Tetrikhevi HPP (110 m head)

The uniqueness of the system lies in its seasonal operation. In winter, when there is no need for irrigation water, water is transferred from the Sioni Reservoir through the canal to the Tbilisi Reservoir, and the cascade's HPPs generate valuable regulating electricity. In summer, the water accumulated in the Tbilisi Reservoir is used to irrigate land via the Lower Samgori Canal. Before the construction of the Sioni Reservoir, the cascade generated 150 million kWh of seasonal (summer) energy. After the Sioni Reservoir was commissioned and the system shifted to a winter regime, generation reached 173 million kWh of regulating (winter) energy, significantly increasing its value to the power system.

== History ==
=== Design and construction ===
The decision to build the Upper Samgori irrigation system and its hydroelectric power stations was made by the Council of Ministers of the USSR in 1946. The technical design was developed by the Tbilisi branch of the "Gidroenergoproekt" institute and was completed by March 1947.

The construction of the Samgori system was declared a "people's construction project," with the "Gruzgidrostroy" trust (formerly "Khramgesstroy") as the direct contractor. In 1950, builders from the trust arrived at a location described in the press as a "'white spot' in the waterless Samgori Steppe" and founded a settlement for future HPP workers. Thousands of workers, engineers, and employees from Tbilisi, as well as collective farmers from adjacent districts, participated in the construction of the canal, including the section near Tetrikhevi. Many of them learned new trades on-site: for example, collective farmers S. Karkozashvili and A. Khutsishvili from the Kaspi district became a carpenter and a concrete foreman, respectively, while K. Kutsniashvili from the village of Digomi became a skilled Stakhanovite mechanic. Thanks to the construction of the system, new settlements, Tetrikhevi and Vaziani, were founded on the irrigated lands.

The station was put into temporary operation in 1952 and into permanent operation in 1955.

=== Operation and privatization ===
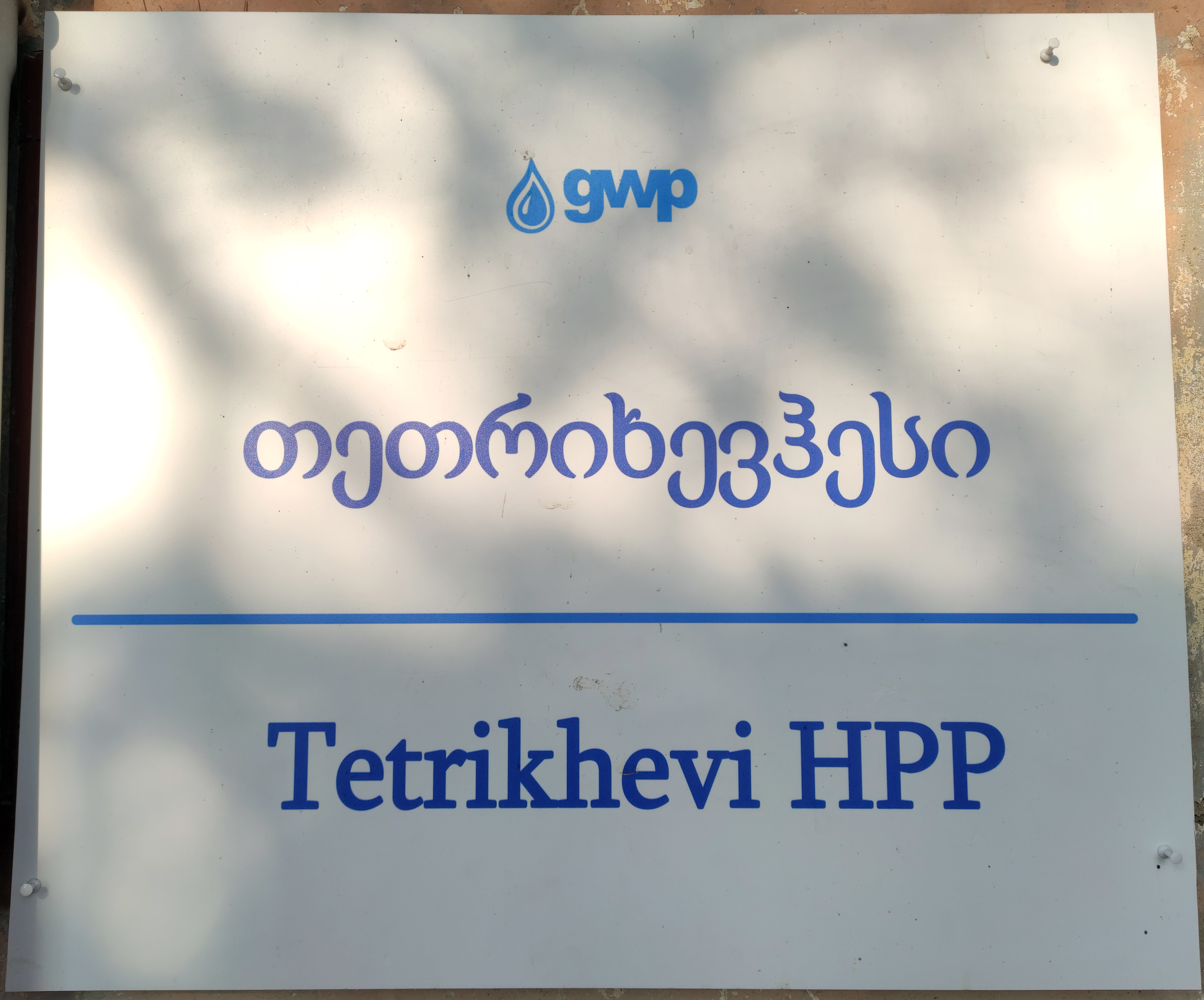
Information plaque at the station. The owner is Georgian Water and Power.

The Tetrikhevi HPP operated as part of the power system of the Georgian SSR. The initial automation project, approved in 1947, was eventually radically revised due to technological advancements, and all three stations of the Samgori cascade were fully automated. In 2010–2011, major overhauls of the hydro-units were carried out at the station.

In the 1990s, during a period of large-scale economic reforms in Georgia, the privatization of small HPPs began. This process was accompanied by disputes between the state-owned company "Sakenergo," which sought to maintain centralized control over the power system, and the Ministry of State Property Management, which saw privatization as a means of attracting investment. In this context, and pending recommendations from the World Bank on restructuring the industry, a temporary moratorium on the privatization of energy facilities was declared in the country.

In March 1995, the Tetrikhevi HPP was privatized by its workforce through a direct sale. At the time of privatization, the station was not operational, but after an investment of 348,000 lari in rehabilitation, it was restarted. As a result, electricity generation increased significantly: from 3.7 million kWh in 1995 to 13.7 million kWh in 1996 and 26 million kWh in 1997. The station employed 23 people. The station later became the property of Georgian Water and Power.

== Technical specifications and equipment ==
=== Hydraulic structures ===
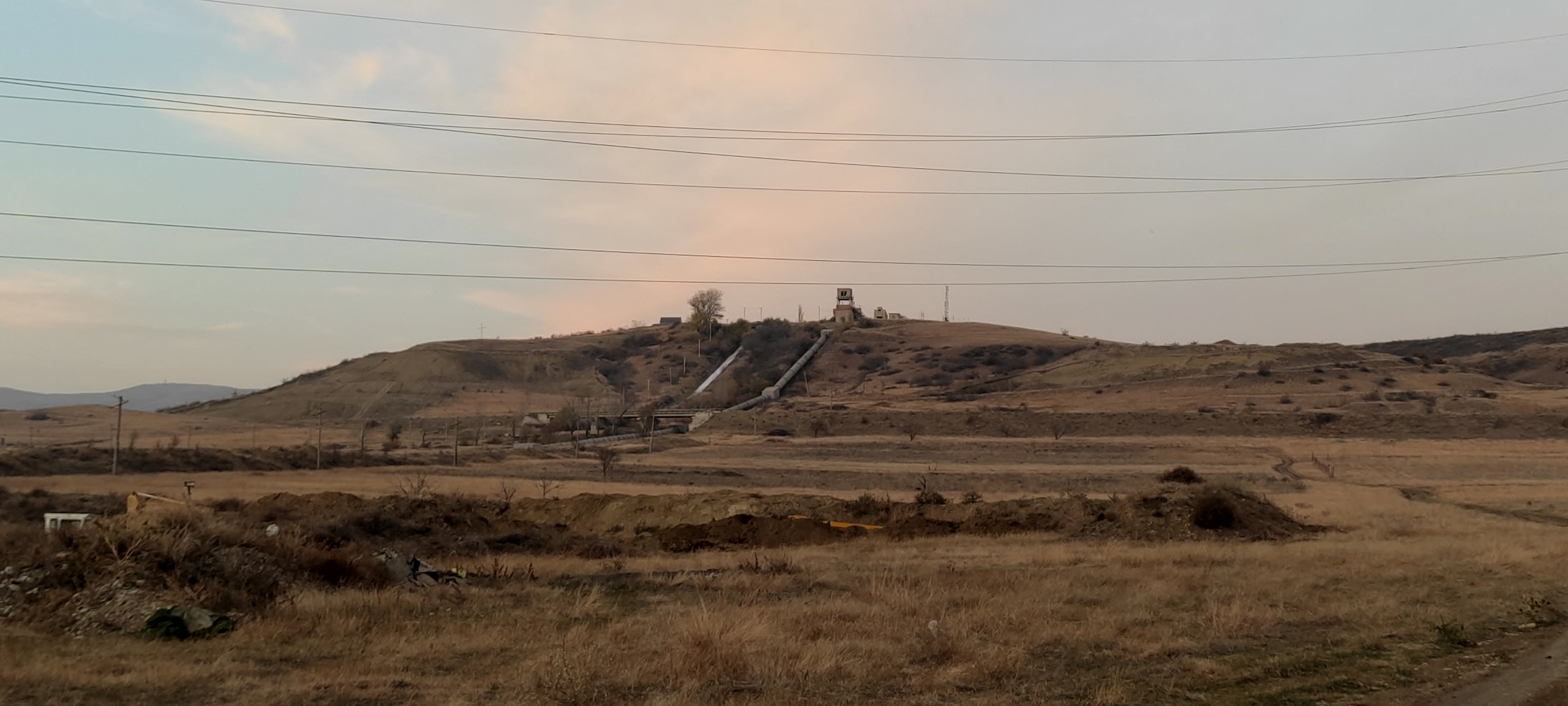
Water intake and penstock of the Tetrikhevi HPP

- Water Intake: Located on the Upper Samgori Main Canal, it has a design capacity of 13 m³/s. It is equipped with trash racks with a cleaning mechanism, three main gates (2.5 × 2.9 m), three maintenance gates (4.75 × 2.8 m), and an ice-flushing gate for discharging frazil ice. Initially, the gates were equipped with electric drives with a lifting capacity of 15 tons, but they are now operated manually using winches.
- Penstock: A single-line steel pipeline with a total length of 994 m (or 1010 m according to other sources). The diameter of the pipeline varies from 1940 mm at the intake outlet to 2340 mm before the HPP building. The wall thickness ranges from 10 to 19 mm. The pipeline is supported by 7 anchor blocks and intermediate supports and is laid in an open trapezoidal channel. A 2-meter-wide right-of-way is provided on both sides of the channel for maintenance. Before the HPP building, the pipeline bifurcates into two lines, each 1.0 m in diameter, to supply water to the turbines.
- Powerhouse: A reinforced concrete frame building measuring 16.0 × 10.9 m with a height of 11.54 m. The machine hall is equipped with an overhead crane with a capacity of 50/10 tons.

=== Main power equipment ===
Two vertical hydro-units are installed in the machine hall:

- Hydro-turbines: Francis turbines, model F15-VM-140, manufactured by the Uralmashzavod plant in 1951. The design flow rate for one turbine is 6.5 m³/s, the rotational speed is 500 rpm, and the runner diameter is 1.405 m (weighing 1750 kg) with 19 blades. The guide vane assembly has 16 vanes. The spiral casing is made of cast metal. To prevent water hammer, the turbines are equipped with bypass relief valves.
- Hydro-generators: Model VGS-260-70-12, manufactured by the Uralelektrotyazhmash plant. The capacity of each generator is 7,000 kW (apparent power 8,235 kVA at a power factor of 0.85), with a voltage of 6.3 kV. The stator current is 756 A, and the rotor current is 412 A. The moment of inertia is 45 t·m², and the efficiency is 96%. The excitation system is an electro-mechanical type, with an exciter model BBC-74.14-66 (60 kW capacity, 115 V).
- Control System: The units are equipped with KCh-1500 type speed governors and oil-pressure units using TP-30 grade turbine oil. According to GOST 9972-2020, this is a petroleum oil with additives, designed for lubricating bearings and serving as a hydraulic fluid in hydro-turbine control systems. The total oil volume in the control system for both turbines is 0.8 m³.

=== Power evacuation scheme ===
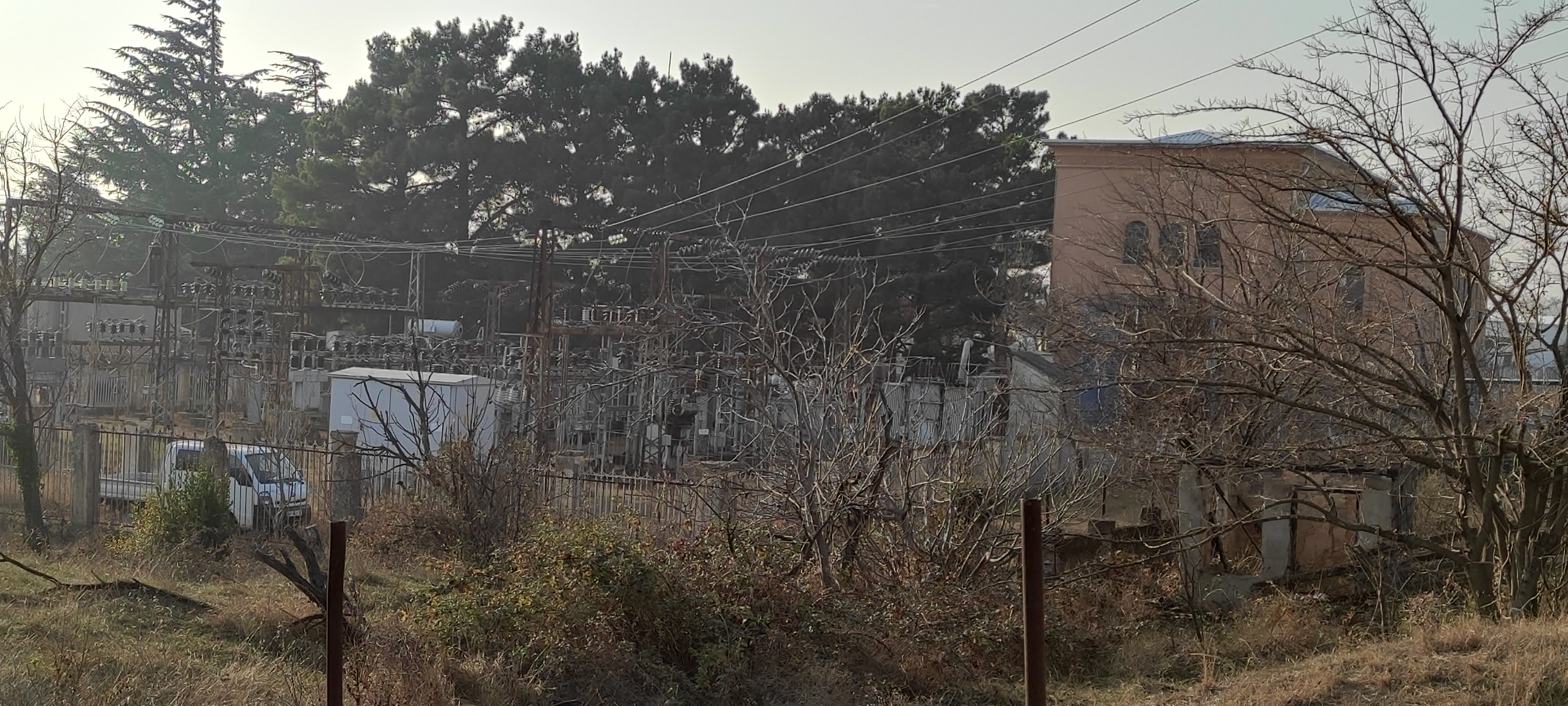
The 35 kV outdoor switchyard and the Tetrikhevi HPP building

The electricity generated by the generators at 6.3 kV is stepped up to 35 kV at an outdoor switchyard. The switchyard is equipped with power transformers T-1 (PDUF-15000/45) and T-2 (TMN-6300/35). Transformer T-2 is a TMN-6300/35 type oil-immersed power transformer, manufactured in accordance with GOST 11920-85. The abbreviation TMN stands for "three-phase, oil-immersed, with on-load voltage regulation." Its main characteristics per the standard are:

- Nominal Power: 6300 kVA
- Winding Voltage: HV (high voltage) — 35 kV, LV (low voltage) — 6.3/11 kV
- Voltage Regulation: On-load tap changer (OLTC) in the range of ±4×2.5% or ±6×1.5%
- Mass: Total mass — 16.6 tons, oil mass — 5.35 tons, transport mass — 12.4 tons.

The switchyard is also equipped with C-35 oil circuit breakers. The station is connected to the Georgian power grid via a double-circuit 35 kV power line to the "Navtlughi" substation.

== Role and significance ==
=== Energy and irrigation significance ===
The Tetrikhevi HPP, like the other stations in the cascade, plays an important role in Georgia's power system by generating electricity primarily during the winter, when there is a deficit of hydro resources. Simultaneously, it is a key link in the irrigation system, ensuring the transfer of water for agricultural lands in the summer. The station's electricity tariff in 1999 was 2.17 tetri/kWh.

Annual electricity generation of Tetrikhevi HPP (1995–2012)
Year	Generation, million kWh	Year	Generation, million kWh
1995	3.77	2004	21.38
1996	13.68	2005	30.48
1997	29.06	2006	29.37
1998	22.56	2007	25.61
1999	13.27	2008	12.60
2000	13.36	2009	18.78
2001	18.07	2010	35.99
2002	23.19	2011	39.00
2003	29.10	2012	26.47

=== Educational significance ===
The Tetrikhevi HPP holds a status uncommon for most industrial facilities. By a decision of the "Sakenergo" Department, the station, along with its training and laboratory building, was transferred to the Faculty of Power Engineering of the Georgian Technical University. At this operational HPP, power engineering students undergo industrial and pre-diploma internships and perform laboratory and practical work, making the station an important center for training engineering personnel for Georgia's energy sector.

== Operational and environmental aspects ==
=== Engineering solutions and personnel ===
In the early years of operation, wave formation was observed in the long, high-velocity canals of the Satkhenisi and Tetrikhevi HPPs, causing significant turbulence in the stilling basins. The problem was solved by installing special damping devices. Later studies showed that to prevent waves, it would have been sufficient to change the canal bed profile from flat to concave, a solution that was successfully implemented at the Tkibuli HPP.

Due to the limited water supply through the Upper Samgori Canal (often not exceeding 7-8 m³/s) for agricultural needs, the Tetrikhevi HPP frequently operates with only one hydro-unit, which artificially limits its generation and prevents the full utilization of its installed capacity.

As of 2014, the station employed 19 people, mostly from the local population, with an average salary of 600–700 lari. In addition to the HPP, other enterprises were located in the settlement; for example, in 1996, the joint-stock company "Vertsi," which was engaged in primary wool processing, was based here.

=== Environmental safety ===
Since water from the Upper Samgori Canal flows into the Tbilisi Reservoir, which is a source of drinking water, the station pays attention to preventing pollution. There is an issue of household waste from the nearby Lilo landfill entering the canal, which requires action from the organization operating the canal.

The 35 kV switchyard and oil storage area are equipped with systems to prevent transformer oil spills, including oil collectors and drainage systems that prevent petroleum products from entering the soil and groundwater. The importance of these measures is underscored by the fact that the turbine oils used at the station are combustible liquids. The station site is composed of Oligocene deposits (sandstones, argillites, clays) overlain by a layer of loam. The area is located in a seismic zone with an intensity of 8 on the MSK scale.
