= Samgori District =

Samgori District სამგორის რაიონი
- Tbilisi District
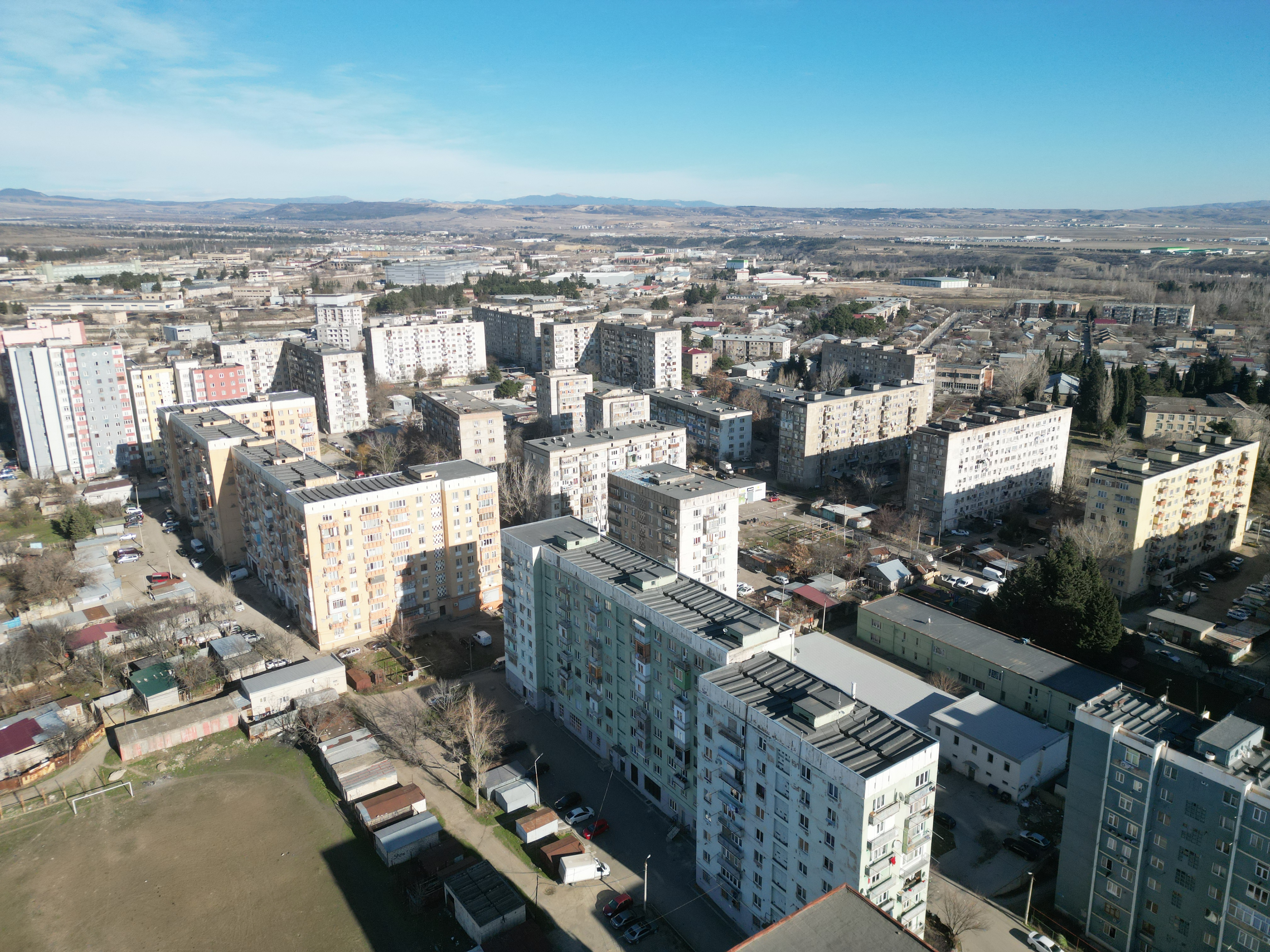
- Lilo Settlement

- Location within Tbilisi
- Coordinates: 41°42′10″N 44°56′25″E
- Country: Georgia
- City: Tbilisi
- Administracion HQ: 14 Moscow Ave, Tbilisi

Government
  - Body: Administration of district
  - Head of district: Kakha Samkharadze

Population (2017)
  - Total: 177,844
- Time zone: UTC+4 (Georgian Time)
- Website: www.tbilisi.gov.ge

Samgori is an administrative district (raioni) of Tbilisi, capital of Georgia. It includes the neighborhoods of Varketili, Orkhevi, Dampalo, Lilo, Navtlughi-2, Africa, Alekseevka, Airport Settlement, and Zeemka.
