= The Amazing Race Australia 1 =

- Season 1
- Presented by: Grant Bowler
- No. of teams: 11
- Winners: Tyler Atkins & Nathan Jolliffe
- No. of legs: 12
- Distance traveled: 50,000 km (31,000 mi)
- No. of episodes: 12

Release
- Original network: Seven Network
- Original release: 16 May – 1 August 2011

Additional information
- Filming dates: 5 November – 29 November 2010

Series chronology
- Next → Season 2

The Amazing Race Australia 1 is the first season of The Amazing Race Australia, an Australian reality competition show based on the American series The Amazing Race. Hosted by Grant Bowler, it featured eleven teams of two, each with a pre-existing relationship, in a race around the world to win the grand prize of A$250,000. The show was produced by activeTV Australia.

This season visited four continents and eleven countries and travelled over 50,000 kilometres (31,000 mi) during twelve legs. Starting in Melbourne, racers travelled through Indonesia, Vietnam, Hong Kong, Macau, South Africa, the Netherlands, the Czech Republic, Poland, Israel, Sri Lanka and Singapore before returning to Australia and finishing in Perth. The show premiered on Australia's Seven Network on 16 May 2011. The season finale aired on 1 August 2011.

Best friends and surfers Tyler Atkins and Nathan Jolliffe were the winners of this season, while models and friends Sam Schoers and Renae Wauhop finished in second place and father and son Jeff and Luke Downes finished in third place.

== Production ==
=== Filming and development ===
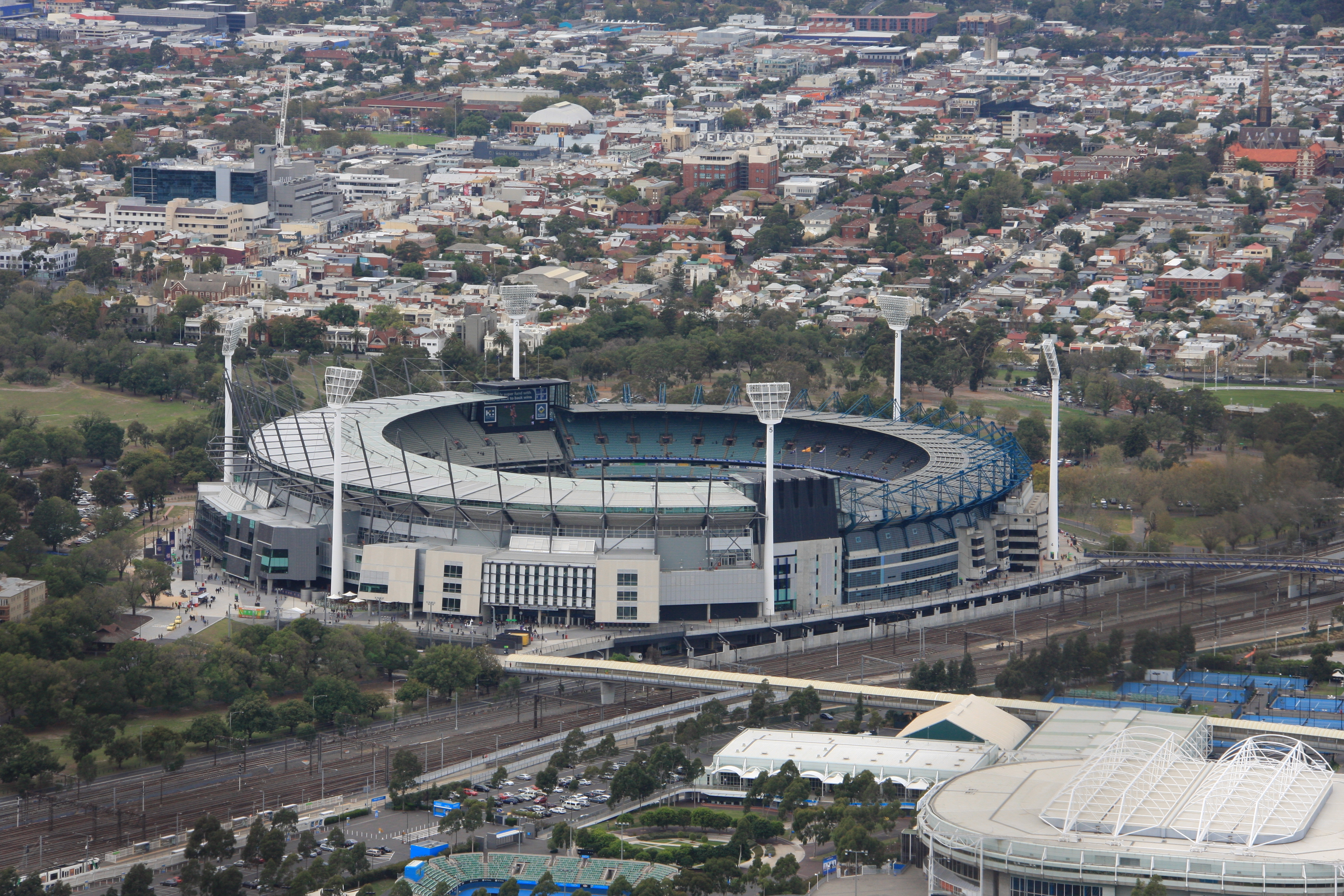
The first series of The Amazing Race Australia started in Melbourne at the Melbourne Cricket Ground with a Roadblock sending racers up and down one of the stadium's six light towers.

Filming began on 5 November 2010 at the Melbourne Cricket Ground in Melbourne. One day later, actor and former host of The Mole Grant Bowler was announced as the show's host. The season travelled across four continents, 11 countries and 23 cities. Some of the countries visited during the series include Indonesia and Israel.

=== Casting ===
Application deadline for the first series closed on 17 September 2010 (extended from 6 September 2010) initially with the applicants required to be at least 18 years old with citizenship or permanent residency. However, due to insurance issues overseas, the minimum age for applicants was raised from 18 to 21.

=== Marketing ===
The Amazing Race Australia was sponsored by Canon, National Australia Bank, Honda, Vodafone and Gloria Jean's Coffees.

== Cast ==
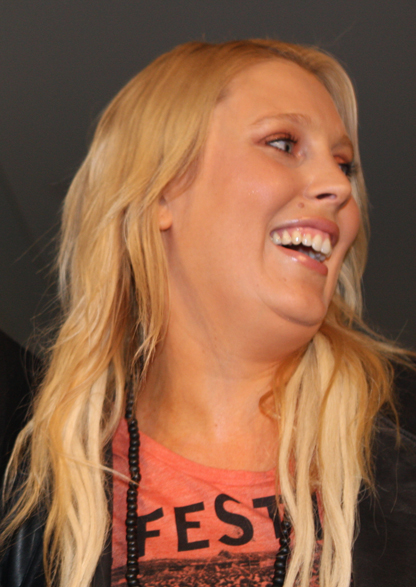
Mel Greig

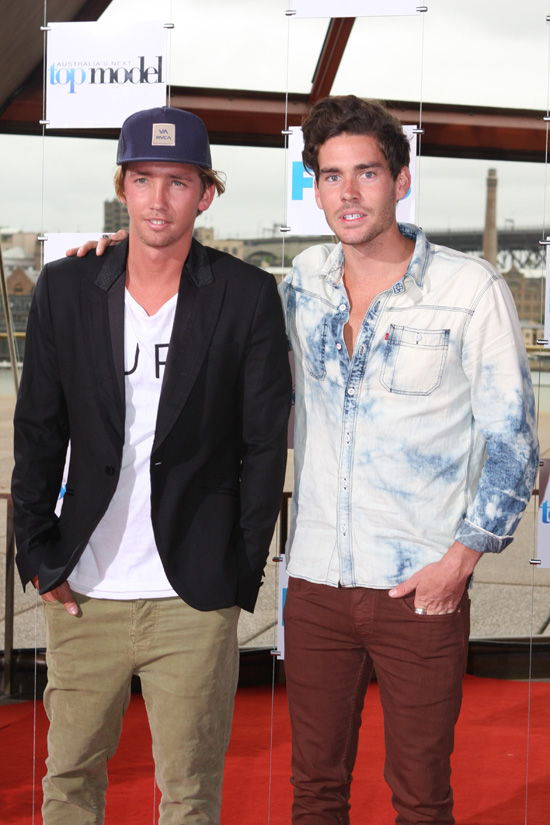
Tyler Atkins and Nathan Joliffe

The cast included married fitness entrepreneurs, farmers, friends of Egyptian descent, models, Big W workmates and reunited sisters. Notably, Nathan, who teamed up with Tyler, is the boyfriend of 2006 Miss Australia, Erin McNaught. Renae was also the runner up of Miss Universe Australia 2010. Entrepreneurs Richard & Joey Marc were the authors of Please Mum, Don't Supersize Me! Ryot & Liberty were the brother and sister of Rebel Wilson.

| Contestants | Age | Relationship | Hometown | Status |
|---|---|---|---|---|
| Ryan "Ryot" Wilson | 23 | Brother & Sister | Sydney, New South Wales | Eliminated 1st (in Huế, Vietnam) |
| Liberty Wilson | 27 | Brother & Sister | Sydney, New South Wales | Eliminated 1st (in Huế, Vietnam) |
| Anne-Marie Brown | 53 | Workmates | Perth, Western Australia | Eliminated 2nd (in Macau) |
| Tracy Read | 46 | Workmates | Perth, Western Australia | Eliminated 2nd (in Macau) |
| Richard Toutounji | 29 | Married Entrepreneurs | Sydney, New South Wales | Eliminated 3rd (in Addo, South Africa) |
| Joey Toutounji | 30 | Married Entrepreneurs | Sydney, New South Wales | Eliminated 3rd (in Addo, South Africa) |
| Mo El-Leissy | 26 | Friends | Melbourne, Victoria | Eliminated 4th (in Cape Town, South Africa) |
| Mos Haroun | 25 | Friends | Melbourne, Victoria | Eliminated 4th (in Cape Town, South Africa) |
| Alana Munday | 25 | Reunited Sisters | Adelaide, South Australia | Eliminated 5th (in Prague, Czech Republic) |
| Mel Greig | 28 | Reunited Sisters | Adelaide, South Australia | Eliminated 5th (in Prague, Czech Republic) |
| Chris Pselletes | 23 | Dating | Sydney, New South Wales | Eliminated 6th (in Niedzica, Poland) |
| Anastasia Drimousis | 21 | Dating | Sydney, New South Wales | Eliminated 6th (in Niedzica, Poland) |
| Dave Miller | 52 | Married Bikers | Geraldton, Western Australia | Eliminated 7th (en route to Masada, Israel) |
| Kelly Miller | 37 | Married Bikers | Geraldton, Western Australia | Eliminated 7th (en route to Masada, Israel) |
| Matt Nunn | 26 | Farmers | Birdsville, Queensland | Eliminated 8th (in Colombo, Sri Lanka) |
| Tom Warriner | 26 | Farmers | Newcastle Waters, Northern Territory | Eliminated 8th (in Colombo, Sri Lanka) |
| Jeff Downes | 60 | Father & Son | Brisbane, Queensland | Third place |
| Luke Downes | 32 | Father & Son | Brisbane, Queensland | Third place |
| Sam Schoers | 22 | Models | Perth, Western Australia | Runners-up |
| Renae Wauhop | 23 | Models | Perth, Western Australia | Runners-up |
| Tyler Atkins | 25 | Surfers | Sydney, New South Wales | Winners |
| Nathan Joliffe | 25 | Surfers | Sydney, New South Wales | Winners |

Subsequent appearances

Nathan Joliffe later competed on the second season of The Celebrity Apprentice Australia.

Richard & Joey had a television show on Foxtel called Feel Good TV.

After this season, Mel Greig replaced Maude Garrett as a co-host of the Hot30 Countdown on the Today Radio Network, where she later gained international notoriety for her role in a controversial prank call to an English hospital that was treating Catherine, Duchess of Cambridge for morning sickness. Subsequently, she also appeared on the fourth season of The Celebrity Apprentice Australia.

Mo El-Leissy had a role on a Muslim sketch comedy show on SBS called Legally Brown.

In 2019, Sam Schoers competed in the sixth season of Australian Survivor.

== Results ==
The following teams are listed with their placements in each leg. Placements are listed in finishing order.

- A red placement with a dagger (†) indicates that the team was eliminated.
- An underlined blue placement with a double-dagger (‡) indicates that the team was the last to arrive at a Pit Stop in a non-elimination leg and was "marked for elimination" in the following leg. (Note: A team that is "marked for elimination" must check in at the Pit Stop in first place; otherwise they would receive a 30-minute penalty.)
- An italicized and underlined placement indicates that the team was the last to arrive at a Pit Stop, but there was no rest period at the Pit Stop and all teams were instructed to continue racing.
- A green ƒ indicates that the team won the Fast Forward.
- A purple ε indicates that the team used an Express Pass on that leg to bypass one of their tasks.
- A brown ⊃ indicates that the team used the U-Turn and a brown ⊂ indicates the team on the receiving end of the U-Turn.
- A violet + indicates that the teams encountered an Intersection.

Team placement (by leg)
| Team | 1 | 2 | 3 | 4 | 5+ (Note: This leg featured an Intersection. The teams were paired up thusly: Tyler & Nathan and Jeff & Luke, Matt & Tom and Chris & Anastasia, Dave & Kelly and Alana & Mel, and Sam & Renae and Mo & Mos.) | 6 | 7 | 8+ (Note: This leg featured an Intersection. The teams were paired up thusly: Jeff & Luke and Tyler & Nathan, Sam & Renae and Chris & Anastasia, and Dave & Kelly and Matt & Tom.) | 9 | 10 | 11 | 12 |
|---|---|---|---|---|---|---|---|---|---|---|---|---|
| Tyler & Nathan | 6th | 1st | 3rd | 2nd⊃ (Note: Tyler & Nathan chose to use the U-Turn on Richard & Joey.) | 1st | 1st | 2nd | 2nd | 3rd | 3rd | 2nd | 1st |
| Sam & Renae | 1st | 5th | 8thε (Note: This team used their Express Pass to bypass one of the tasks on this leg.) | 5th | 6th | 6th | 4th | 3rd (Note: Sam & Renae and Chris & Anastasia initially arrived 1st and 2nd, respectively, but both teams were penalized for quitting the Intersection task. Chris & Anastasia were given the full 4-hour penalty for choosing to quit the task, while Sam & Renae were given a 2-hour penalty after being forced to quit the task by Chris & Anastasia. While Sam & Renae's placement dropped to 3rd, Chris & Anastasia's placement dropped to last.) | 4th | 4th‡ | 1st | 2nd |
| Jeff & Luke | 4th | 4th | 6th | 4th | 3rd | 3rd | 3rd | 1st | 2nd | 2nd | 3rd | 3rd |
| Matt & Tom | 5th | 2nd | 5th | 1st | 2nd | 4th | 6th (Note: This team arrived last at the Pit Stop, but they were instructed to continue racing.) | 5th | 1st | 1st | 4th† | |
| Dave & Kelly | 2nd | 6th | 4th | 6th | 4th | 5th | 5th | 4th | 5th† | | | |
| Chris & Anastasia | 7th | 3rd | 7th | 3rd | 7th | 2nd | 1st | 6th† | | | | |
| Alana & Mel | 8th (Note: The starting placements of Anne-Marie & Tracy and Alana & Mel were switched, resulting in Anne-Marie & Tracy and Alana & Mel beginning this leg in 9th and 8th place, respectively. No explanation was given for this switch.) | 10th | 2nd | 7th | 5th | 7th† | | | | | | |
| Mo & Mos | 11th‡ | 7th (Note: Mo & Mos initially arrived 4th, but were issued a 30-minute penalty for being "marked for elimination" and not arriving 1st. Three teams checked in during this penalty time, dropping Mo & Mos to 7th.) | 9th | 8th | 8th† | | | | | | | |
| Richard & Joey | 10th | 9th | 1stƒ (Note: This team won the Fast Forward on this leg.) | 9th†⊂ | | | | | | | | |
| Anne-Marie & Tracy | 9th | 8th | 10th† | | | | | | | | | |
| Ryot & Liberty | 3rd | 11th† | | | | | | | | | | |

== Race summary ==
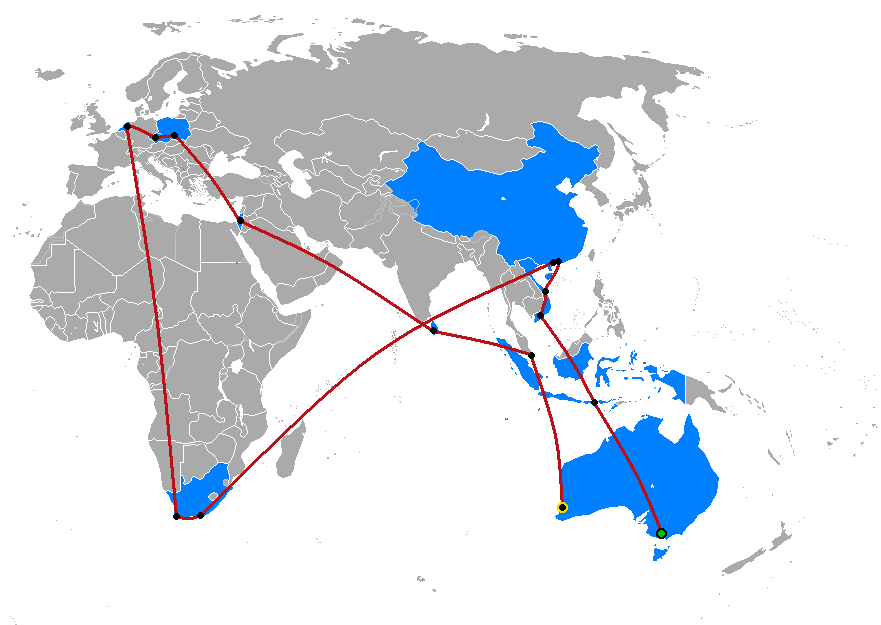
The route map of the first series of The Amazing Race Australia.

| Destinations | Air travel Rail travel Water travel Bus travel Helicopter travel Bicycle travel Gondola travel |
| Route Markers | Detour Roadblock Fast Forward Intersection U-Turn Pit Stop |

=== Leg 1 (Australia → Indonesia) ===
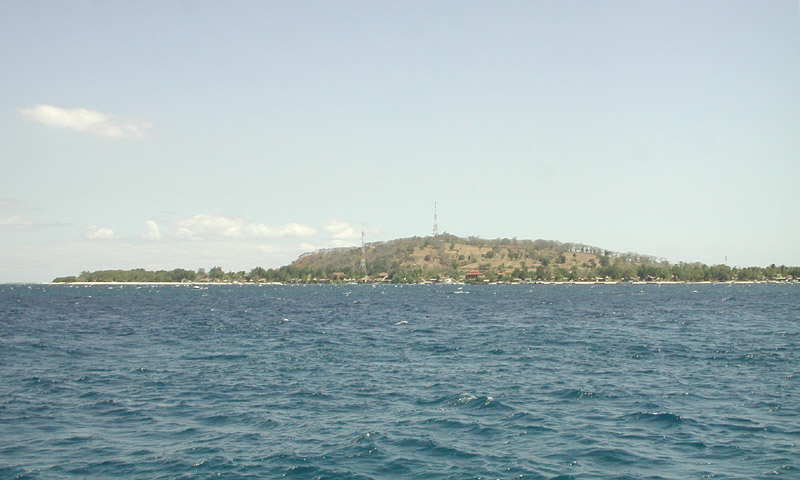
The islet of Gili Trawangan was the first Pit Stop in the inaugural series of The Amazing Race Australia.

- Episode 1: "Nothing's Smooth Sailing with Us" (16 May 2011)
- Prizes: A$10,000 and the Express Pass (awarded to Sam & Renae)

Locations

- Melbourne, Victoria (Melbourne Cricket Ground) (Starting Line)
- Melbourne → Denpasar, Indonesia
- Denpasar (BlueWater Express) → Mataram (Tandjoengkarang Fishing Village)
- Mataram (Pura Lingsar)
- Mataram (Mandalika Market)
- Malaka (Malimbu Beach) → Gili Trawangan (Main Beach)
- Gili Trawangan (Halik Reef)
- Gili Trawangan (Sunset Point)

Episode summary

- In this series' first Roadblock at the Melbourne Cricket Ground, one team member had to scale 75 metres (246 ft) up one of the six light towers, retrieve their next clue and then abseil down to their partner.
- Teams were instructed to fly to Denpasar on the island of Bali. Once there, teams had to sign up for one of three boats leaving the next morning for the island of Lombok. The first boat carried the first three teams, while the remaining boats, leaving in 30-minute intervals after the first, could carry four teams each. Once on Lombok, teams had to search the Tandjoengkarang fishing village for their next clue, which was hidden under the nets of a fishing boat on Mapak Beach. Teams then went to Pura Lingsar Temple and had to run through a rice cake war ritual called perang topat, where they were pelted with rice cakes and powder by locals, in order to retrieve their next clue.
- This series's first Detour was a choice between Cash or Carry. In Cash, teams had to make and sell 15 bowls of bakso for no less than Rp 5,000 per bowl before exchanging their earnings with the stall owner for their next clue. In Carry, both team members had to carry a basket of produce on their heads from one market stall to another without dropping the baskets in order to receive their next clue.
- From Malimbu Beach, teams had to ride an outrigger to Gili Trawangan. Once there, both team members had to don snorkelling gear and swim to Halik Reef, where one member had to retrieve a briefcase. After returning to shore, teams had to correctly count the money in the briefcase in order to receive their next clue, which instructed them to travel by a horse-drawn carriage called a cidomo to the Pit Stop at Sunset Point.

Additional note

- This was a non-elimination leg.

=== Leg 2 (Indonesia → Vietnam) ===
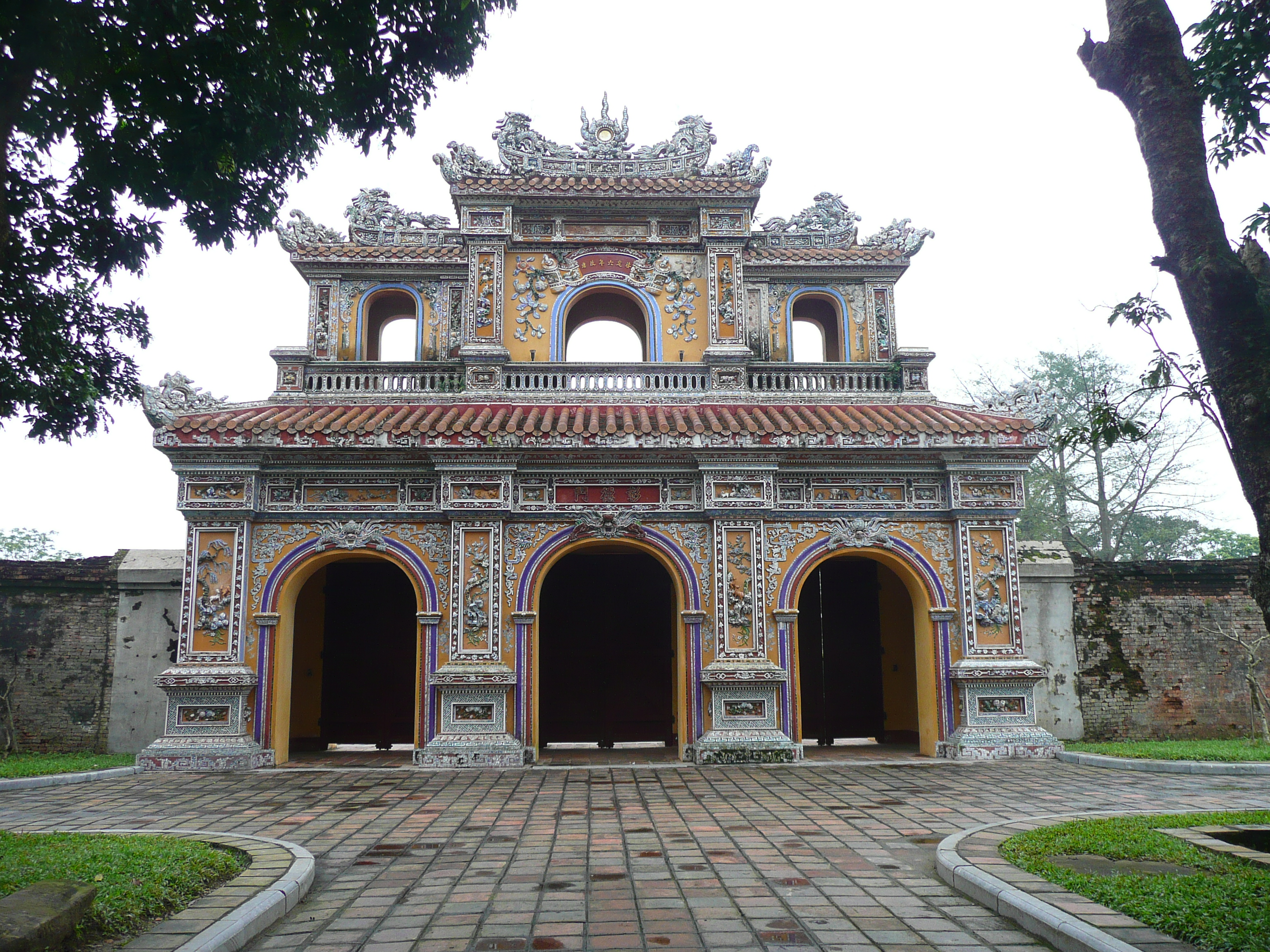
This leg's Pit Stop was located at the citadel of the former Vietnamese capital in Huế.

- Episode 2: "Like Four Seasons in a Day" (23 May 2011)
- Prizes: Two tickets to the 2011 AFL Grand Final at the Melbourne Cricket Ground and a VIP tour of the National Sports Museum (awarded to Tyler & Nathan)
- Eliminated: Ryot & Liberty

Locations

- Mataram (Tandjoengkarang Fishing Village)
- Mataram or Denpasar → Ho Chi Minh City, Vietnam
- Ho Chi Minh City (Saigon Opera House)
- Ho Chi Minh City → Huế
- Huế (Trần Thanh Mại Garage)
- Huế (Bằng Chicken Farm or Rice Paddy Field)
- Hương Thủy (Khải Định Tomb)
- Hương Trà (Tomb of Minh Mạng) & Hương Thủy (Khải Định Tomb)
- Huế (Huế Citadel)

Episode summary

- At the start of this leg, teams were instructed to fly to Ho Chi Minh City, Vietnam. Teams could either take a fast boat back to Denpasar to book a flight to Ho Chi Minh City or they could book a flight directly from the island of Lombok. Once there, teams had to travel to the Saigon Opera House, where they had to search amongst hundreds of women wearing nón lás and find the one woman who had their team name written on her fan, which they could exchange for their next clue.
- Teams were then instructed to fly to Huế. Once there, teams had to go to Trần Thanh Mại Garage, where they had to change the two rear tyres and motor oil of an ex-army jeep in order to receive their next clue. Teams could then use the jeep as their transportation for the rest of the leg.
- This leg's Detour was a choice between Carry Fowl or Carabao. In Carry Fowl, teams had to travel to Bằng Chicken Farm, where they had to gather 20 live chickens and carry them in đòn gánhs to a marked stall at a nearby market in order to receive their next clue. In Carabao, teams had to travel to a rice paddy, where they use an ox-drawn plow to till the soil until the plow caught a buried rope attached to an Amazing Race flag, which they could exchange for their next clue.
- After the Detour, teams found their next clue at the Khải Định Tomb in Hương Thủy.
- In this leg's Roadblock, one team member had to retrieve seven coins representing the seven emperors of the Nguyễn dynasty at the Tomb of Minh Mạng and then bring them back to the Khải Định Tomb, where they had to place the coins in chronological order based on the emperors' reigns in order to receive their next clue directing them to the Pit Stop: Huế Citadel.

Additional note

- All route markers in Vietnam were coloured yellow and green instead of yellow and red, so as to avoid confusion with the former South Vietnamese national flag, which was also yellow and red.

=== Leg 3 (Vietnam → Hong Kong → Macau) ===
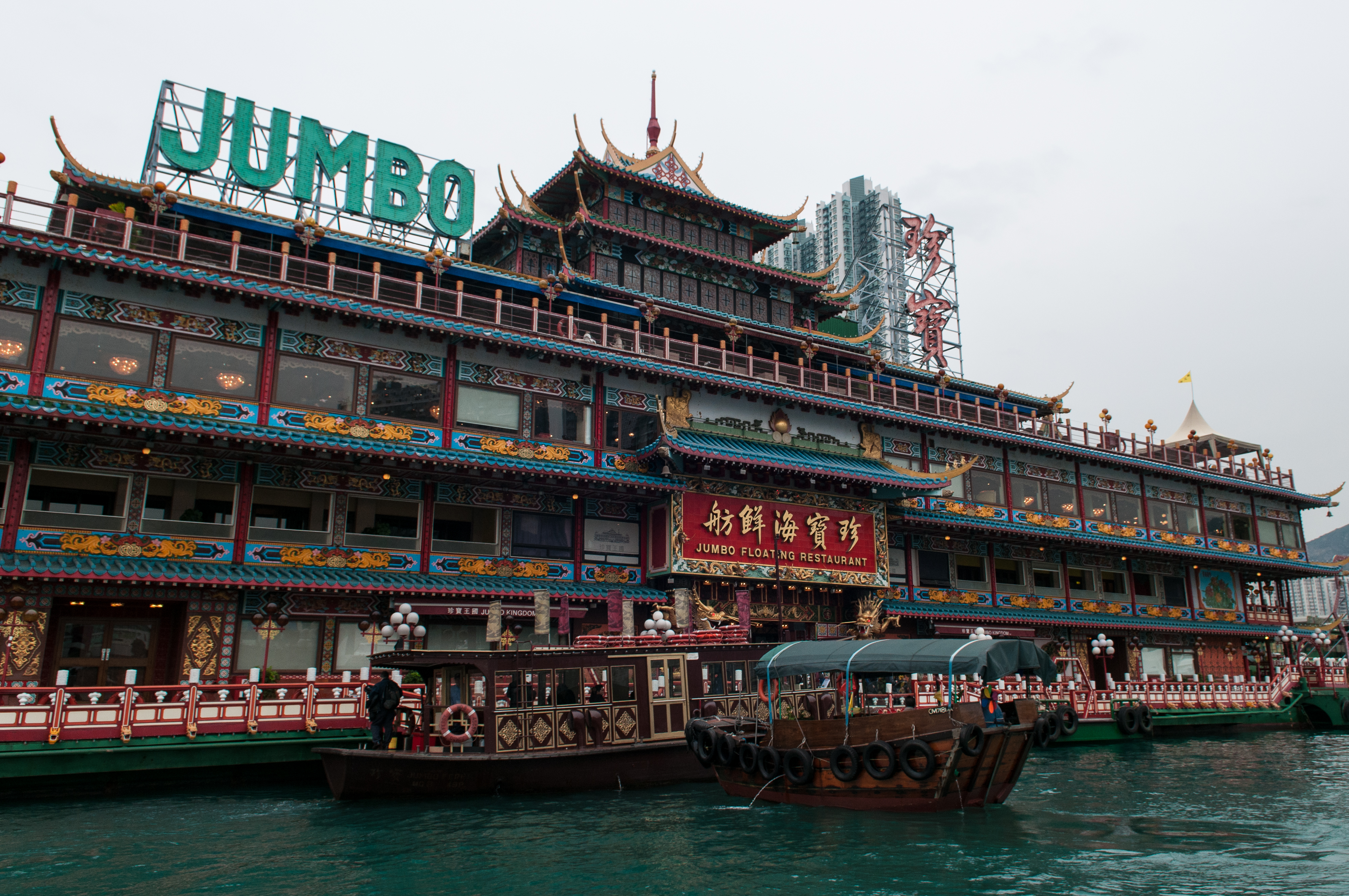
In Hong Kong, teams visited the Jumbo Floating Restaurant, where they had to bite into fortune cookies to find their clue.

- Episode 3: "We've Got Pain, But We've Not Lost Any Weight" (30 May 2011)
- Prize: A$10,000 (awarded to Richard & Joey)
- Eliminated: Anne-Marie & Tracy

Locations

- Huế (Huế Citadel)
- Huế → Hong Kong
- Hong Kong (Aberdeen – Aberdeen Marina Club (in Chinese) → Jumbo Floating Restaurant)
- Hong Kong (Causeway Bay – Tin Hau Temple)
- Hong Kong (Kowloon – Kowloon Walled City Park)
- Hong Kong → Macau
- Macau (Cotai – The Venetian Macao)
- Macau (Coloane – A Ma Cultural Village)

Episode summary

- At the start of this leg, teams were instructed to fly to Hong Kong. Once there, teams had to travel by ferry to the Jumbo Floating Restaurant, where they had to bite into over a thousand fortune cookies until they found one with a specific message inside telling them to receive their next clue from the waiter.
- This season's only Fast Forward required one team to completely have their heads shaved. Richard & Joey won the Fast Forward.
- This leg's Detour was a choice between Lion Dance or Kung Fu Stance. For both Detour options, teams had to travel to the Kowloon Walled City Park. In Lion Dance, teams had to dress up and perform a traditional lion dance to the dance master's satisfaction in order to receive their next clue. In Kung Fu Stance, teams had to perform a series of precise kung fu moves to the kung fu master's satisfaction, and then both team members had to break six clay tiles in order to receive their next clue.
- After the Detour, teams were instructed to travel by ferry to Macau. Once there, teams had to travel to The Venetian Macao, where they had to don formal attire and play Baccarat with a dealer. Each time teams won a game, they earned a Mahjong lettered tile, and after they won ten games, the titles revealed the next location of their next clue: A MA VILLAGE.
- In this leg's Roadblock, one team member had to arrange twelve paper lanterns depicting the animals of the Chinese zodiac in chronological order using clues given to them. Once the animals were in the correct order – rat, ox, tiger, rabbit, dragon, snake, horse, goat, monkey, rooster, dog and pig – a gate opened that allowed teams entrance to the Pit Stop. Sam & Renae used their Express Pass to bypass this Roadblock.

=== Leg 4 (Macau → South Africa) ===
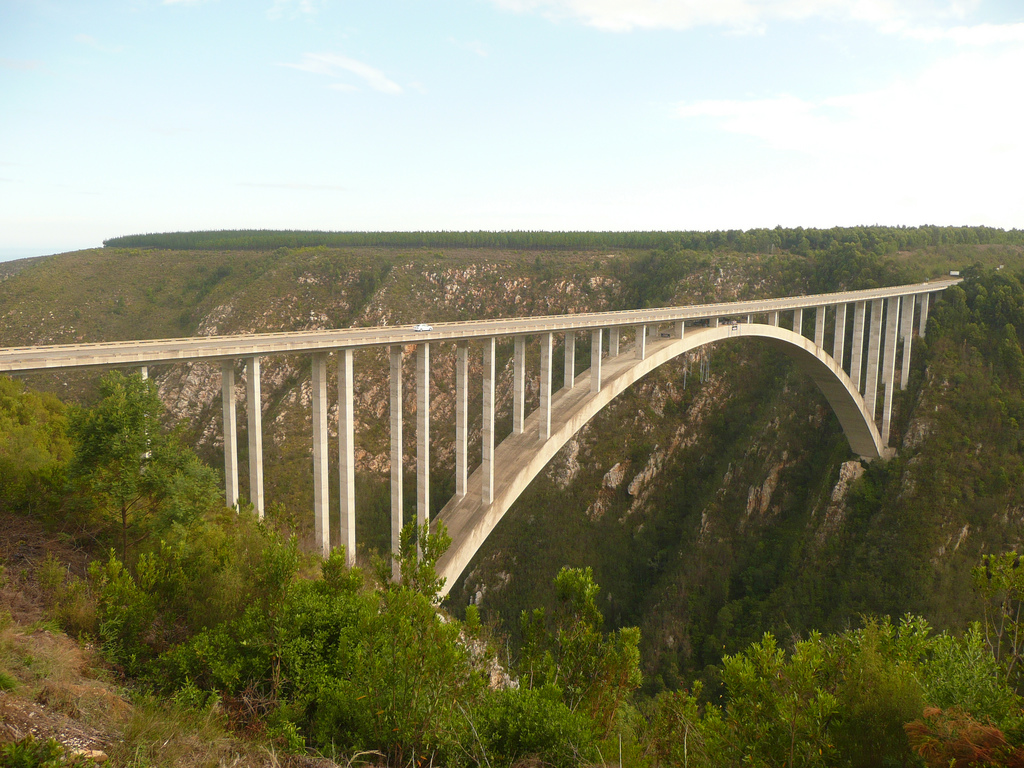
For the leg's Roadblock, racers had to bungee jump off of the Bloukrans Bridge outside of Port Elizabeth.

- Episode 4: "A Town That Was 15-20 Letters Long" (6 June 2011)
- Prize: A$5,000 shopping spree at Kathmandu (awarded to Matt & Tom)
- Eliminated: Richard & Joey

Locations

- Macau (Santo António – Ruins of Saint Paul's)
- Macau or Hong Kong → Port Elizabeth, South Africa (Port Elizabeth International Airport)
- Graaff-Reinet (Camdeboo National Park – Valley of Desolation)
- Port Elizabeth (Kragga Kamma Game Park)
- Garden Route National Park (Bloukrans Bridge)
- Addo (Nomathamsanqa)
- Addo (Addo Elephant National Park)

Episode summary

- At the start of this leg, teams were instructed to fly to Port Elizabeth, South Africa. Once there, teams had to search the airport parking lot for a marked car with a clue inside the windscreen that instructed them to drive to Camdeboo National Park and search the Valley of Desolation for their next clue.
- This leg's Detour was a choice between Smash or Bash. For both Detour options, teams had to drive to Kragga Kamma Game Park. In Smash, teams had to throw a traditional South African club called a knobkerrie from a distance and shatter four suspended pots in order receive their next clue. In Bash, teams had to build a large giraffe feeder, using only the provided tools and materials, in order to receive their next clue.
- In this leg's Roadblock, one team member had to perform the world's highest bridge bungy jump off of the Bloukrans Bridge in order to receive their next clue.
- After the Roadblock, teams had to travel to Nomathamsanqa, where they had to collect a goat and deliver it to a witch doctor known as a sangoma. Teams then had to pronounce a Xhosa phrase and receive a blessing from the sangoma before receiving their next clue, which directed them to the Pit Stop: Addo Elephant National Park.

Additional note

- Tyler & Nathan chose to use the U-Turn on Richard & Joey.

=== Leg 5 (South Africa) ===
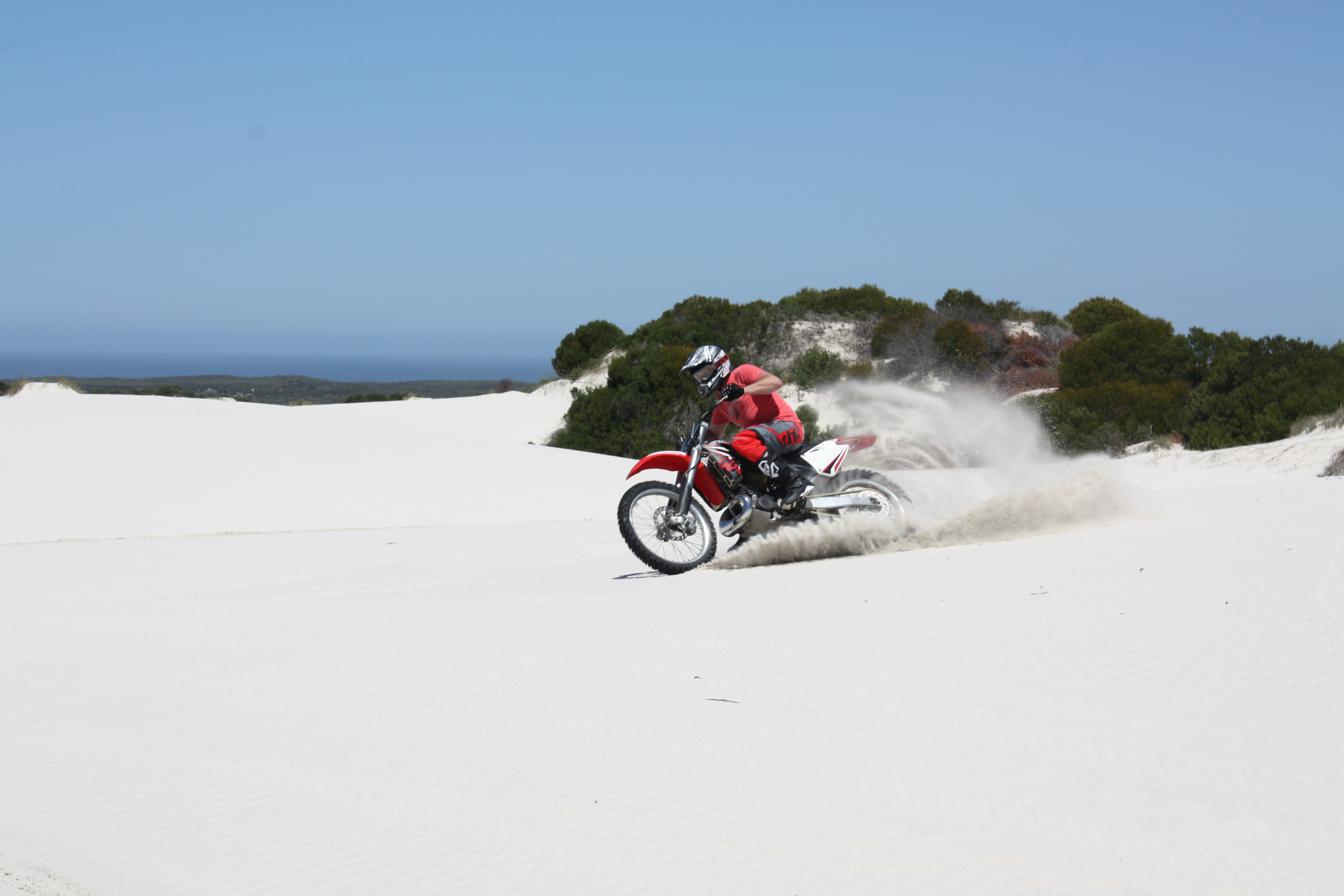
The final task in Cape Town had teams search the Atlantis Dunes for a clue.

- Episode 5: "The Woman-ness to Realize Where You Went Wrong" (13 June 2011)
- Prize: A home entertainment system (awarded to Tyler & Nathan)
- Eliminated: Mo & Mos

Locations

- Addo (Addo Elephant National Park)
- Port Elizabeth → Cape Town
- Cape Town (Dolphin Beach)
- Melkbosstrand (Melkboss Air Strip)
- Cape Town (Victoria & Alfred Waterfront – Nobel Square)
- Cape Town (Kargo Warehouse)
- Cape Town (Khayelitsha – Intyatyambo Orphanage)
- Paarl (Valley Gun Club or Nelson's Creek Wine Estate)
- Atlantis (Atlantis Dunes)
- Cape Town (Rhodes Memorial)

Episode summary

- At the start of this leg, teams were instructed to fly to Cape Town. Once there, teams had to travel to Dolphin Beach for their next clue.
- In this leg's Roadblock, teams had to drive to Melkboss Air Strip. There, one team member had to perform a 9,000-foot (2,700 m) tandem skydive. The non-participating team member had to help guide their partner to the landing zone using signal flares. After team members reunited, the instructor handed them their next clue.
- After arriving at Nobel Square, teams encountered an Intersection, which required two teams to mutually join together to complete the following task. The teams were paired up thusly: Tyler & Nathan and Jeff & Luke, Matt & Tom and Chris & Anastasia, Dave & Kelly and Alana & Mel, and Sam & Renae and Mo & Mos. The joined teams had to load two trailers with toys and supplies at Kargo Warehouse and deliver them to the Intyatyambo Orphanage. Once everything was delivered, the teams received their next clue. After this task, teams were no longer joined.
- This leg's Detour was a choice between Guns or Rosé. In Guns, teams had to shoot nine moving clay targets using a shotgun at the Valley Gun Club in order to receive their next clue. Team members had to alternate shooting after five shots. In Rosé, teams had to roll a large wine barrel across Nelson's Creek Wine Estate to a station and completely fill it with rosé in order to receive their next clue.
- After the Detour, teams drove to the Atlantis Dunes, where they had to drive quad bikes to an area filled with fifteen overturned baskets. Underneath three baskets were teams' next clue while the rest contained hourglasses of varying sizes that teams had to overturn, and they had to wait for the sand to run out before they could continue racing. Teams then had to check in at the Pit Stop: the Rhodes Memorial.

=== Leg 6 (South Africa → Netherlands → Czech Republic) ===
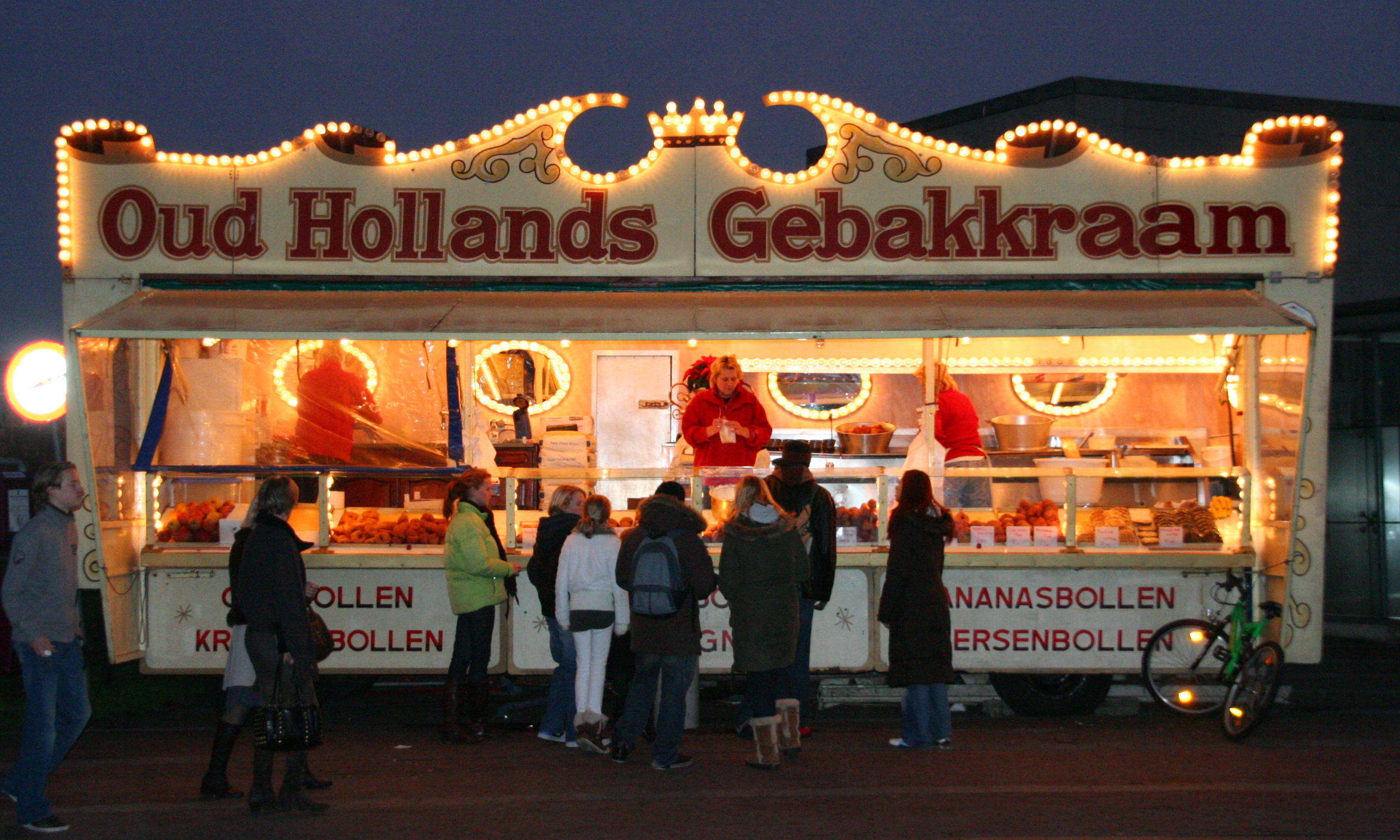
Teams visited the Oud Hollands Gebakkraam food cart in Amsterdam, where each team member had to eat two appelbollen before receiving their next clue.

- Episode 6: "The Last Team Will Spend the Night in the Dungeon" (20 June 2011)
- Prize: A$5,000 shopping spree at Kathmandu (awarded to Tyler & Nathan)
- Eliminated: Alana & Mel

Locations

- Cape Town (Rhodes Memorial)
- Cape Town → Amsterdam, Netherlands
- Amsterdam (Van Baerlestraat – Oud Hollands Gebakkraam (in Dutch))
- Amsterdam → Prague, Czech Republic
- Prague (Powder Tower)
- Prague (Charles Bridge – Statue of St. Vitus)
- Prague (Old Town Square & Hotel U Prince or St. Agnes of Bohemia Convent & Kinský Palace)
- Prague (Střelecký Island)
- Prague (Prague Castle)

Episode summary

- At the start of this leg, teams were instructed to fly to Amsterdam, Netherlands. Once there, teams had to travel to the Oud Hollands Gebakkraam, where each team member had to eat two appelbollen, a popular Belgian pastry that is made out of a cored apple wrapped in puff pastry, in order to receive their next clue. Teams were then instructed to travel by train to Prague, Czech Republic. The first four teams to finish their appelbollen received tickets for a sleeping car, while the remaining three teams were given tickets for standard seats in a passenger car. Once there, teams had to travel to the Powder Tower and search nearby for their clue. Teams were instructed to search the Charles Bridge for a "holey" statue – the statue of St. Vitus – where they found their next clue.
- This leg's Detour was a choice between Chivalry or Delivery. In Chivalry, teams had to don knight's armour in the Old Town Square and search for a Key Master, who would give them a key by asking "Do you have a key to a damsel's heart?" They then had to search the square for a damsel in distress near the "Prince" (Hotel U Prince) and exchange the key for their next clue. In Delivery, teams had to carry a young princess in a royal sedan chair from the St. Agnes of Bohemia Convent to Kinský Palace in order to receive their next clue.
- In this leg's Roadblock, teams had to travel to Střelecký Island and find a medieval village, where one team member had to hit a target on the archery range twice within forty attempts in order to receive their next clue directing them to the Pit Stop: Prague Castle. Chris, Dave and Luke also received a A$50 bonus each for hitting a bullseye.

=== Leg 7 (Czech Republic) ===
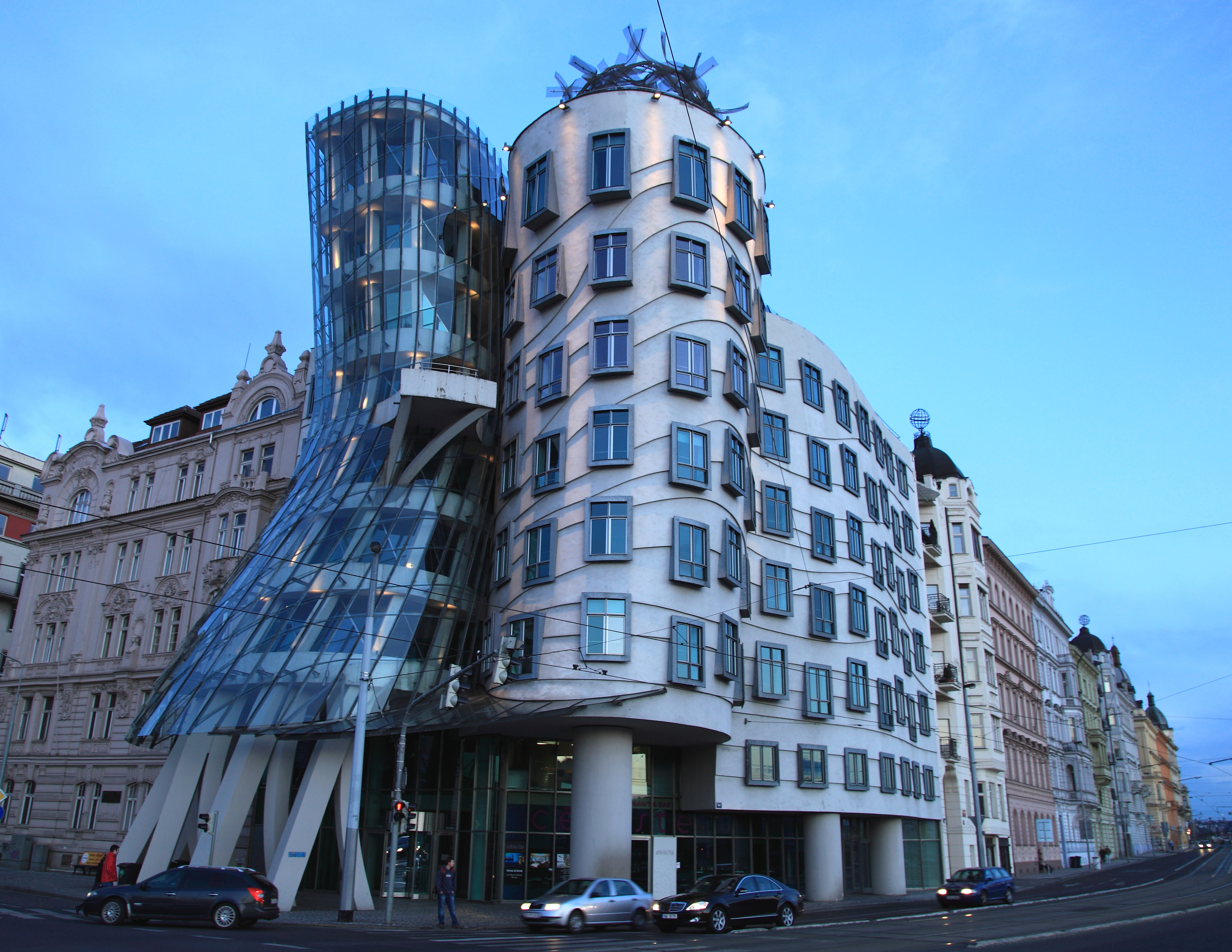
While in Prague, teams paid a visit to the Dancing House.

- Episode 7: "It's Just Like Where's Wally" (27 June 2011)

Locations

- Prague (Prague Castle)
- Prague (Dancing House)
- Prague (Štvanice Stadium)
- Prague (St. Nicolas Church)
- Plzeň (Pilsner Urquell Brewery or Formanka Restaurant)
- Kutná Hora (Church of the Assumption of Our Lady and Saint John the Baptist)
- Kutná Hora (Church of Bones)

Episode summary

- At the start of this leg, teams had to travel to the Dancing House and search for a 1982 Škoda sedan, which contained their next clue and also served as their only means of transportation on this leg. Teams were then directed to drive to Štvanice Stadium, where they had to score one goal against a Czech national hockey team goaltender in order to receive their next clue.
- Teams had to drive to St. Nicolas Church, where they had to collect cameras and climb to a former Soviet spy post at the top of the cathedral's tower, where they had 30 seconds to locate and photograph a man waving an Amazing Race flag, listed in the clue as a "flagged person of interest," and not the man waving a flag advertising a local museum. If teams photographed the correct man, they received their next clue; otherwise, they had to return to the bottom of the tower and, while climbing back up, count the number of steps in order to receive their next clue.
- This leg's Detour was a choice between Stack Up or Stack In. In Stack Up, teams went into the Pilsner Urquell Brewery, where they had to stack two pallets with cases of 45 Pilsner beer cartons each in order to receive their next clue. In Stack In, teams had to consume 18 traditional Czech sausages called játernice in order to receive their next clue.
- After the Detour, teams had to drive to the Church of the Assumption of Our Lady and Saint John the Baptist in Kutná Hora in order to find their next clue.
- In this leg's Roadblock, one team member had to climb to the attic of the church and then abseil down to the floor in order to receive their next clue directing them to the Pit Stop: the Church of Bones.

Additional note

- There was no elimination at the end of this leg; all teams were instead instructed to continue racing.

=== Leg 8 (Czech Republic → Poland) ===
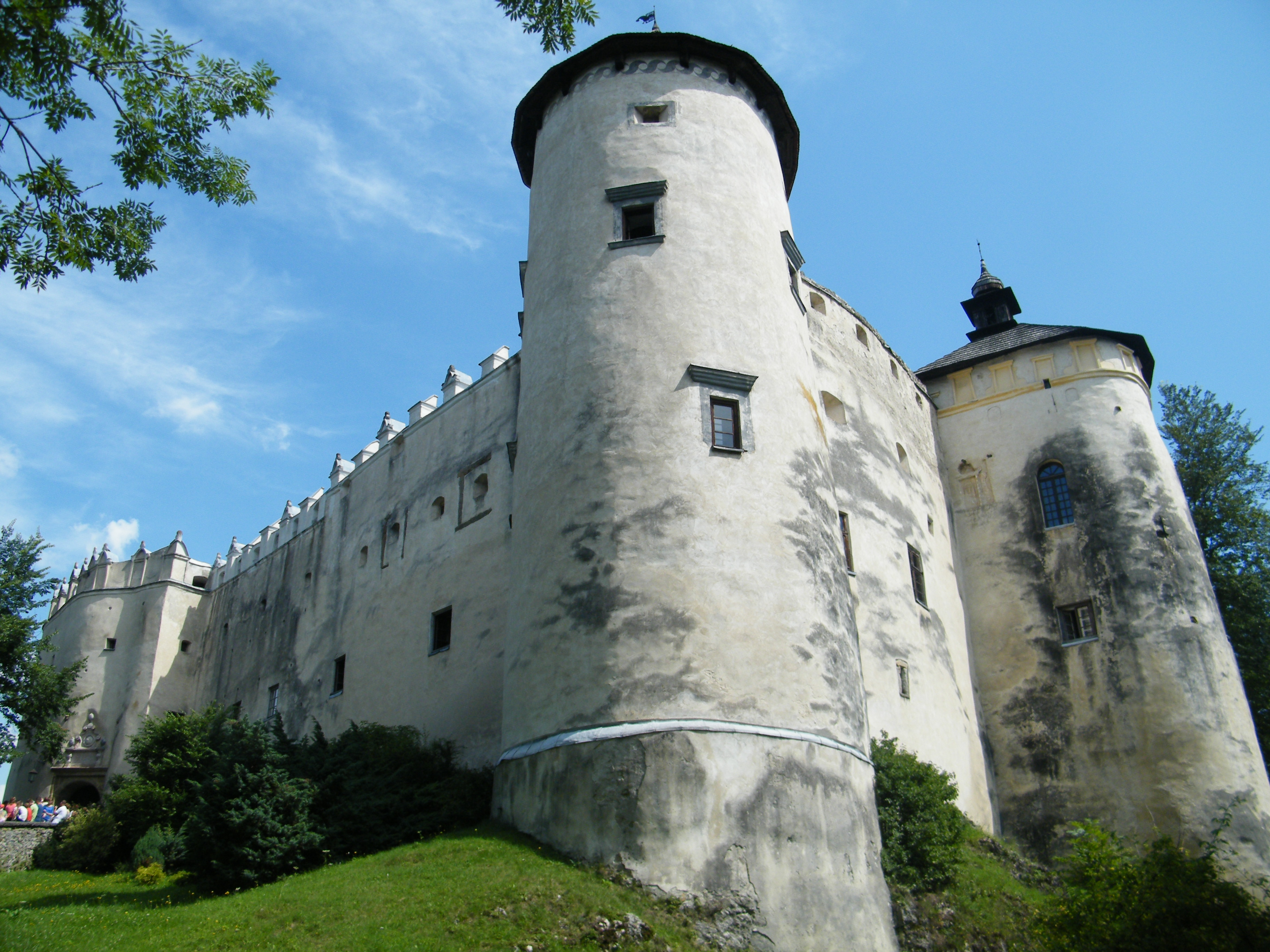
Teams ended this leg in Poland at Niedzica Castle.

- Episode 8: "At Least the View's Nice" (4 July 2011)
- Prize: A$10,000 (awarded to Jeff & Luke)
- Eliminated: Chris & Anastasia

Locations

- Kutná Hora → Kraków, Poland (Kraków Główny Railway Station)
- Kraków (Main Square) (Unaired)
- Wieliczka (Wieliczka Salt Mine)
- Zakopane (Polish Countryside or Karczma Czarci Jar Restaurant)
- Czorsztyn (Cape Stylchen)
- Niedzica (Niedzica Castle)

Episode summary

- At the start of this leg, teams were instructed to travel by train to Kraków, Poland. Once there, teams had to search outside the Kraków Główny railway station for a marked vehicle, which contained their next clue on the windshield. Teams were then instructed to drive to the Wieliczka Salt Mine.
- In this leg's Roadblock, one team member had to descend 100 metres (330 ft) into a salt mine and push a cart containing rock salt to the end of a mine shaft. They then had to dig through the cart to find crystal keys, one of which unlocked the salt king's crypt, which contained their next clue.
- This leg's Detour was a choice between Herd or Hoe Down. In Herd, teams had to travel into the Polish countryside and build a pen using provided fencing and then herd three marked sheep into it in order to receive their next clue. In Hoe Down, teams had to travel to Karczma Czarci Jar Restaurant, where they had to don Polish Highland clothing and perform a Polish axe dance to the satisfaction of the village judge in order to receive their next clue.
- After the Detour, teams had to drive to Cape Stylchen in order to find their next clue.
- At Cape Stylchen, teams encountered a second Intersection and were paired up thusly: Jeff & Luke and Tyler & Nathan, Sam & Renae and Chris & Anastasia, and Dave & Kelly and Matt & Tom. Two members of the Intersected teams had to work together until they cut four slices off of a large log using a two-man saw in order to receive their next clue, swapping members after each slice. After this task, teams were no longer joined.
- After the Intersection, teams had to check in at the Pit Stop: Niedzica Castle.

Additional note

- After retrieving their vehicle and their clue at the train station, teams had to then search the Main Square for their next clue, which directed them to the Roadblock. This element was unaired, although teams could be seen reading their Roadblock clue at a clue box in the Main Square.

=== Leg 9 (Poland → Israel) ===
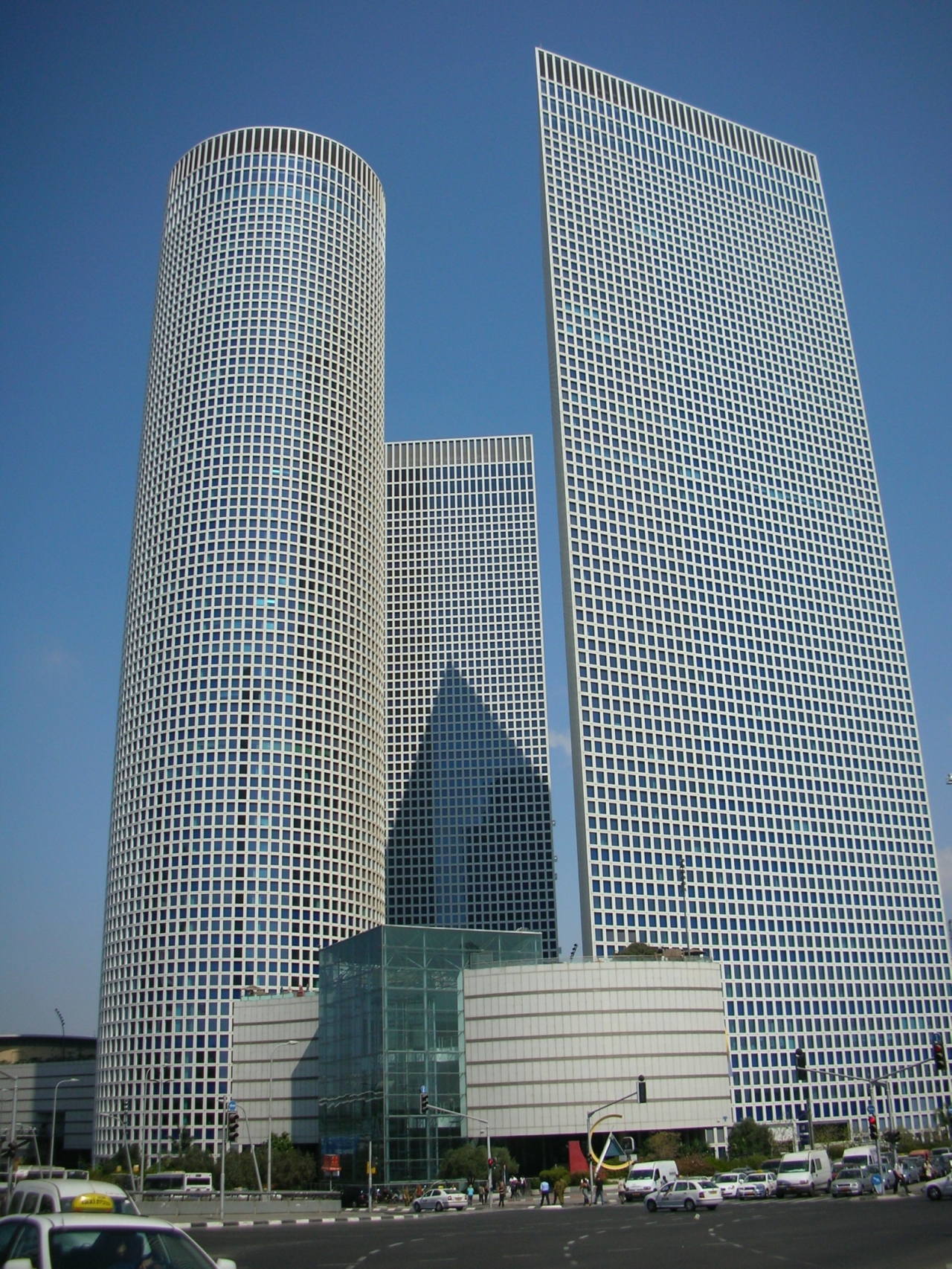
After arriving in Israel, teams visited the Azrieli Center for a clue.

- Episode 9: "When I Saw Everyone Freezing to Death" (11 July 2011)
- Prize: A personal computer package (awarded to Matt & Tom)
- Eliminated: Dave & Kelly

Locations

- Niedzica (Niedzica Castle)
- Kraków → Tel Aviv, Israel
- Tel Aviv (Azrieli Center)
- Tel Aviv → Haifa
- Haifa (Port of Haifa)
- Jaffa (Hasimta Theatre)
- Tel Aviv (Jerusalem Beach)
- Southern District (Masada)

Episode summary

- At the start of this leg, teams were instructed to fly to Tel Aviv, Israel. Once there, teams had to travel to the Azrieli Center and make their way to the helipad of the tallest of the three towers in order to find their Roadblock clue.
- In this leg's Roadblock, teams first had to travel by train to the Port of Haifa, where one team member had to rig a container truck, drive it through an obstacle course and then reverse the container into a loading space in order to receive their next clue.
- After the Roadblock, teams had to travel to the Hasimta Theatre in order to find their next clue. There, one team member had to answer five questions and their partner then had to match the answers in order to receive their next clue.

| Questions | Answers | | | | |
| Questions | Dave & Kelly | Jeff & Luke | Matt & Tom | Sam & Renae | Tyler & Nathan |
|---|---|---|---|---|---|
| Which team's relationship do you envy? | Dave & Kelly | Tyler & Nathan | Jeff & Luke | Tyler & Nathan | Jeff & Luke |
| Which team would be first to lend you a helping hand? | Sam & Renae | Matt & Tom | Jeff & Luke | Anne-Marie & Tracy | Chris & Anastasia |
| If the Race were a foursome, which team would you pair up with? | Alana & Mel | Tyler & Nathan | Jeff & Luke | Tyler & Nathan | Jeff & Luke |
| Which team has been the most strategic? | Jeff & Luke | Matt & Tom | Tyler & Nathan | Richard & Joey | Richard & Joey |
| Apart from your own team, which team most deserves to win? | Sam & Renae | Tyler & Nathan | Jeff & Luke | Matt & Tom | Sam & Renae |

- This leg's Detour was a choice between Find Unseen or Make 13. For both Detour options, teams had to travel to Jerusalem Beach in Tel Aviv. In Find Unseen, teams had to use a metal detector to a search a marked area for the one key that would unlock a chest that contained their next clue. In Make 13, teams had to play matkot, a traditional Israeli bat and ball game similar to beach tennis. They had to hit a ball back and forth thirteen times without letting it hit the ground in order to receive their next clue.
- After the Detour, teams had to find a marked car and drive themselves to the ancient Masada ruins to check in at the Pit Stop.

Additional note

- Dave & Kelly failed to reach the Pit Stop. After all of the other teams had already checked in at the Pit Stop, Grant came to them before they could reach Masada in order to inform them of their elimination.

=== Leg 10 (Israel) ===
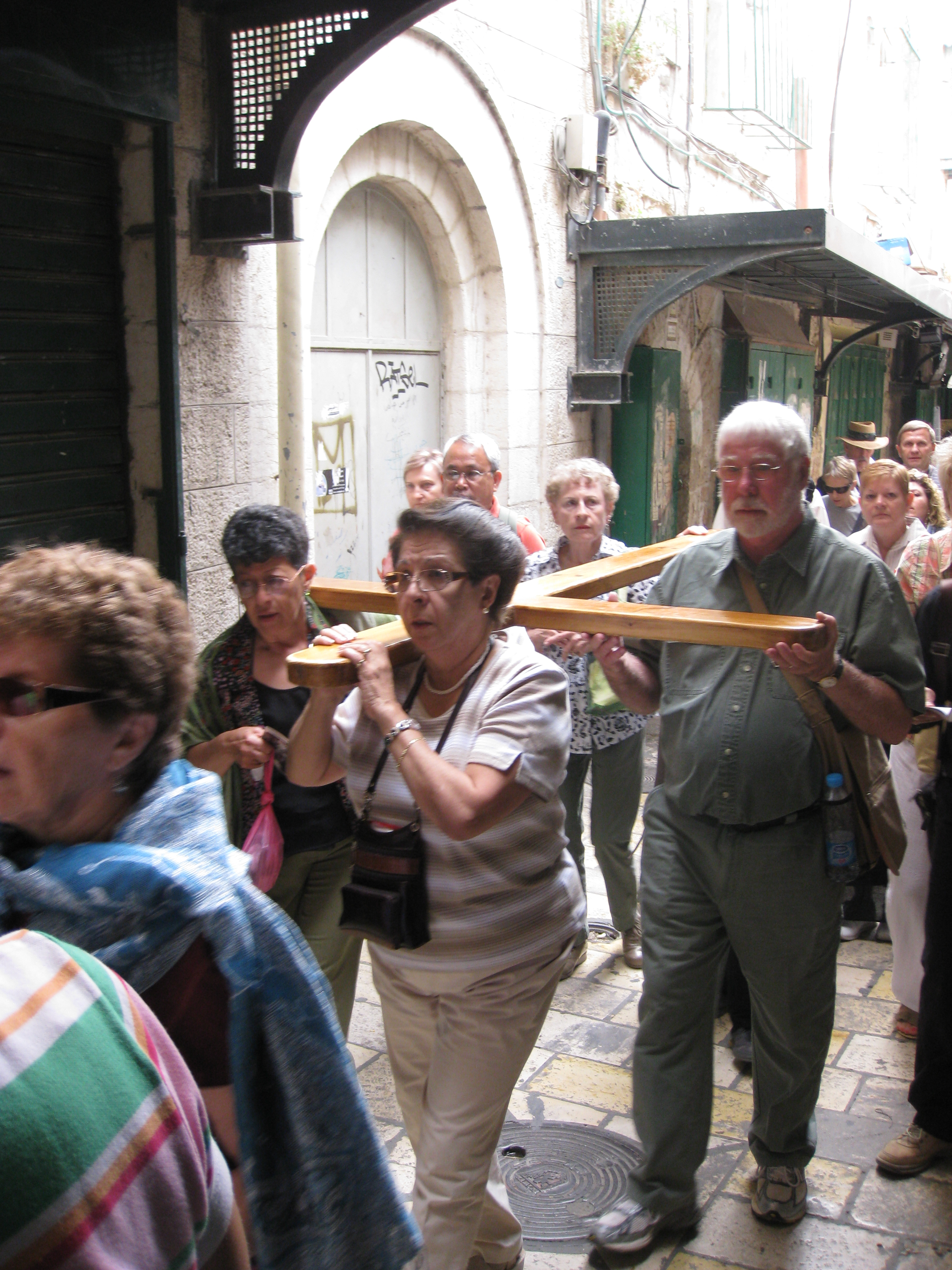
In the "Pilgrim's Trail" Detour in Jerusalem, teams had to carry an 80-kg cross along the Via Dolorosa, the path Jesus took to his crucifixion.

- Episode 10: "I Hope We Don't Have to Wear a Crown of Thorns" (18 July 2011)
- Prize: A$10,000 (awarded to Matt & Tom)

Locations

- Southern District (Masada)
- Southern District (Masada – Winter Palace of King Herod)
- West Bank (Qumran)
- Jerusalem (Central Post Office Building)
- Jerusalem (Old City – Via Dolorosa & Church of the Holy Sepulchre or Western Wall & City of David)
- Jerusalem (Dung Gate)
- Jerusalem (Aish HaTorah World Centre)

Episode summary

- At the start of the leg, teams had to take a cable car up to the ruins to find the Winter Palace of King Herod, where they found their next clue, which instructed them to drive to the site where the Dead Sea Scrolls were discovered: the Qumran.
- In this leg's Roadblock, one team member had to translate a Hebrew message written from right-to-left on a scroll resembling the Dead Sea Scrolls using a translation guide and then transcribe the message left-to-right in order to receive their next clue.
- After the Roadblock, teams had to drive to the Central Post Office in Jerusalem. During the previous Pit Stop, teams recorded messages to their loved ones at home and had to hold onto the memory cards until they reached the post office, where they had to mail their messages home in order to receive their next clue.
- This leg's Detour was a choice between Pilgrim's Trail or Holy Grail. In Pilgrim's Trail, teams had to travel to the Old City, pick up an 80-kilogram (180 lb) wooden cross and carry it along the Via Dolorosa – the path Jesus is said to have taken to the site of His crucifixion – passing by the nine Stations of the Cross, to the Church of the Holy Sepulchre in order to receive their next clue. In Holy Grail, teams had to travel to the Western Wall and enter an active archaeological dig site in the Kotel tunnels. There, teams had to unearth a clay pot and then walk through the tunnels to deliver it to an archaeologist in the City of David in order to receive their next clue.
- After the Detour, teams had to walk along the Rampart Walk near Dung Gate to find their next clue, which directed them to the Pit Stop: the Aish HaTorah World Centre.

Additional note

- This was a non-elimination leg.

=== Leg 11 (Israel → Sri Lanka) ===
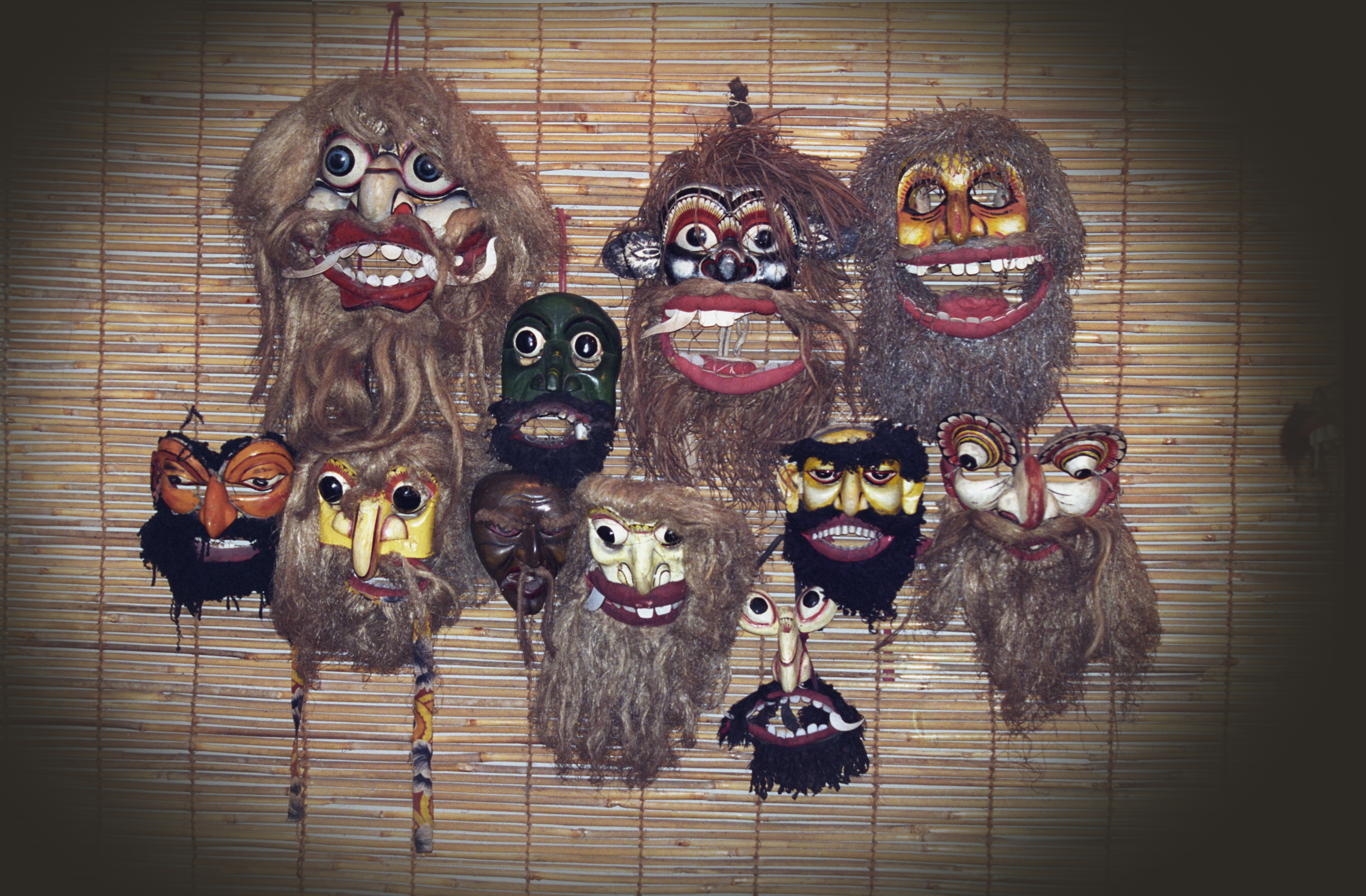
In the town of Ambalangoda, teams had to search a street festival for a man wearing a particular mask in order to receive their next clue.

- Episode 11: "You the Nice Cowboy" (25 July 2011)
- Prize: A home entertainment system (awarded to Sam & Renae)
- Eliminated: Matt & Tom

Locations

- Jerusalem (Dung Gate)
- Tel Aviv → Colombo, Sri Lanka
- Colombo (Gangaramaya Temple)
- Colombo (St. John's Fish Market)
- Colombo → Galle (Galle Railway Station)
- Galle (Galle Fort)
- Galle → Ambalangoda (Ambalangoda Train Station – Mask Vendor)
- Nugegoda (Trendy Connections Garment Factory)
- Colombo (Independence Square)

Episode summary

- At the start of this leg, teams were instructed to fly to Colombo, Sri Lanka. Once there, teams had to travel to Gangaramaya Temple and receive a blessing from a monk before receiving their next clue.
- This leg's Detour was a choice between Count or Carry. In Count, teams had to find a marked stall with a basket full of fish and correctly count the number of fish in order to receive their next clue. In Carry, teams had to use a wooden trolley to transfer fifteen blocks of unbroken ice through a busy market to a marked stall in order to receive their next clue.
- After the Detour, teams were instructed to travel by train to Galle. They then had to make their way to Galle Fort, where they found their next clue. Teams had to unlock a chest; the combination of the lock was the year Sri Lanka gained independence from the United Kingdom: 1948. Inside the chest was a clue that asked for the birth year of Sri Lanka's first prime minister, D.S. Senanayake: 1884. That combination opened a second chest, which directed teams to travel by bus to Ambalangoda. At the Ambalangoda train station, teams had to find a mask vendor. There, teams had to study a mask and then search a nearby street festival for a person wearing an identical mask in order to receive their next clue.
- In this leg's Roadblock, one team member had to use an industrial sewing machine to properly sew fabric cuttings into a shirt in order to receive their next clue, which directed them to the Pit Stop: Independence Square in Colombo.

Additional note

- Jeff & Luke bought second-class tickets on the train to Galle, when the clue specifically instructed them to purchase third-class tickets. As a result, they incurred a 10-minute penalty before they could leave Galle railway station.

=== Leg 12 (Sri Lanka → Singapore → Australia) ===
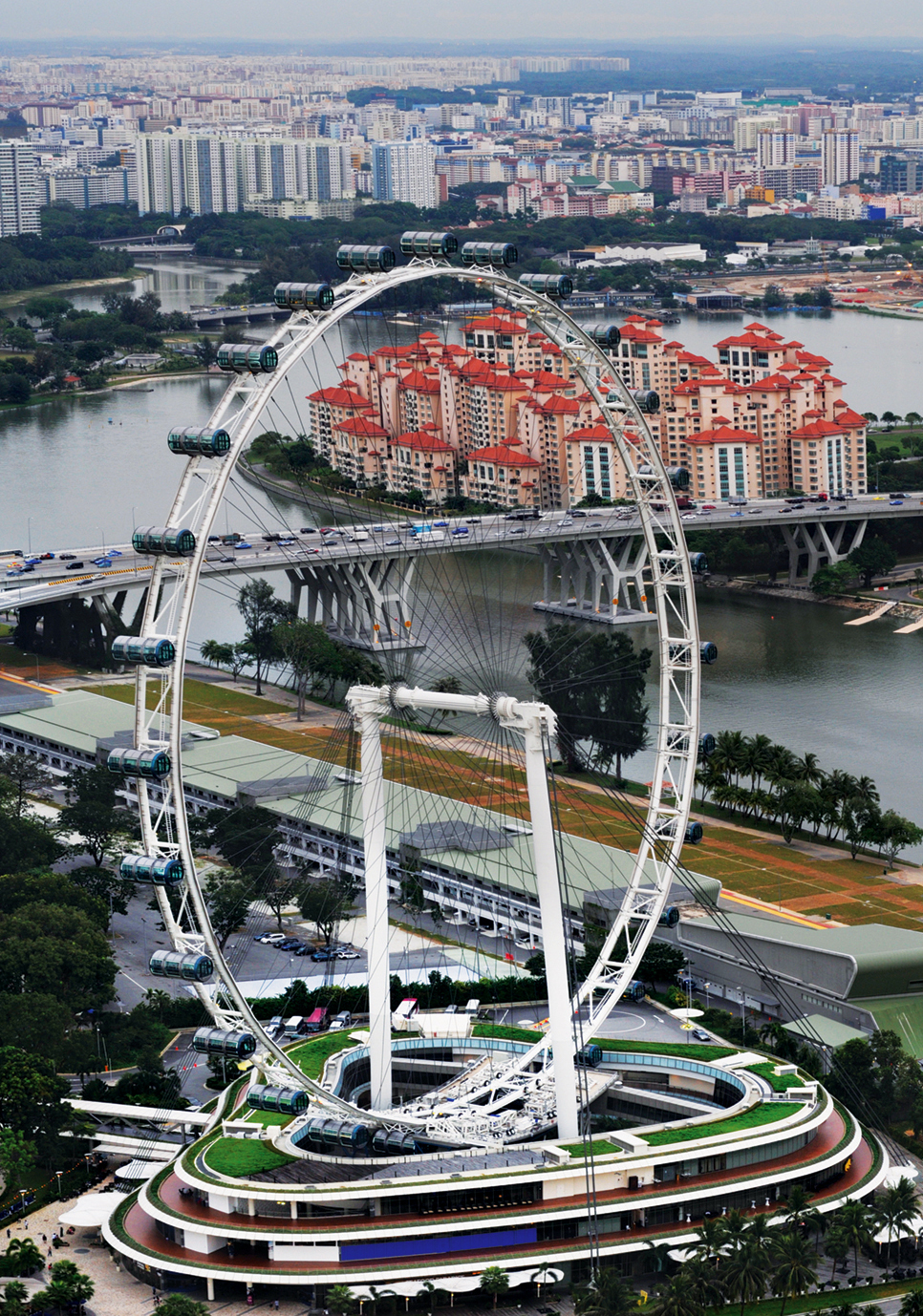
Teams visited the Singapore Flyer before returning to Australia.

- Episode 12: "You're Good at Spending Money" (1 August 2011)
- Prize: A$250,000
- Winners: Tyler & Nathan
- Runners-up: Sam & Renae
- Third place: Jeff & Luke

Locations

- Colombo (Independence Square)
- Colombo → Singapore
- Singapore (Goh Chor Tua Pek Kong Chinese Temple)
- Singapore (Marina Bay Sands)
- Singapore (Hong San See Taoist Temple)
- Singapore (Jurong Chinese Gardens)
- Singapore (Singapore Flyer)
- Singapore → Perth, Western Australia
- Perth (City Centre – Kings Park Overlook)
- Fremantle (Fremantle Prison)
- Perth (Cape Peron)
- Perth (Heirisson Island)

Episode summary

- At the start of this leg, teams were instructed to fly to Singapore. Once there, teams had to travel to the Goh Chor Tua Pek Kong Chinese Temple, where they had to break open durians until they found one with red-coloured flesh inside in order to receive their next clue.
- This season's final Detour at the Marina Bay Sands was a choice between Dare or Stair. In Dare, teams had to take an elevator to the 55th floor of Tower 1. There, both team members had to traverse a tightrope to Tower 2 and then go back in order to receive their next clue. In Stair, teams had to climb the stairs to the 55th floor of Tower 1, collect a Singaporean plush toy souvenir, take the stairs back down and then climb the stairs of Tower 2 to the 56th floor, where they could exchange their toy for their next clue.
- After the Detour, teams had to travel to the Hong San See Taoist Temple and receive a five-minute palm reading from a fortune teller before receiving their next clue, which directed them to the Jurong Chinese Gardens. There, teams had to search for a statue of Confucius that led them to their next clue. Teams then went to the Singapore Flyer, where they had to choose one of the 28 capsules of the Ferris wheel and read the envelope inside. Only three capsules contained a clue, while the others contained envelopes that simply told teams to try again. If teams chose an incorrect capsule, they had to wait out a 21-minute rotation before they could make another attempt.
- Teams were instructed to fly to Perth, Western Australia. Once there, teams had to drive to the Kings Park Overlook for the next clue, which directed them to Fremantle Prison. There, teams were given twelve keys that they had to use to search the cells of the prison until they found the cell with their next clue. Teams had to lock each door they opened before they could continue searching. Teams then had to drive to Cape Peron in Rockingham in order to find their next clue.
- In this season's final Roadblock, one team member had to choose twelve flags out of a basket of sixteen flags (which included four decoys) and arrange the flags of the countries they visited during the race in chronological order before receiving their final clue, which directed them to the finish line: Heirisson Island.

| Nation | Flag |
|---|---|
| Australia | (Australia) |
| Indonesia | (Indonesia) |
| Vietnam | (Vietnam) |
| China | (China) |
| South Africa | (South Africa) |
| Netherlands | (Netherlands) |
| Czech Republic | (Czech Republic) |
| Poland | (Poland) |
| Israel | (Israel) |
| Sri Lanka | (Sri Lanka) |
| Singapore | (Singapore) |
| Australia | (Australia) |

== Ratings ==
| # | Episode Title | Airdate | Viewers | | | | | Nightly viewers | Rank | Ref |
| # | Episode Title | Airdate | Sydney | Melbourne | Brisbane | Adelaide | Perth | Nightly viewers | Rank | Ref |
|---|---|---|---|---|---|---|---|---|---|---|
| 1 | "Nothing's Smooth Sailing with Us" (Indonesia) | 16 May 2011 | 338,000 | 437,000 | 183,000 | 124,000 | 176,000 | 1,258,000 | #5 | |
| 2 | The End in the Beginning / "Like Four Seasons in a Day" (Vietnam) | 23 May 2011 | 340,000 | 403,000 | 177,000 | 113,000 | 111,000 | 1,144,000 | #7 | |
| 3 | Chinese Zodiac / "We've Got Pain, But We've Not Lost Any Weight" (China) | 30 May 2011 | 305,000 | 413,000 | 165,000 | 115,000 | 137,000 | 1,135,000 | #9 | |
| 4 | "A Town That Was 15-20 Letters Long" (South Africa) | 6 June 2011 | 307,000 | 393,000 | 161,000 | 133,000 | 172,000 | 1,165,000 | #7 | |
| 5 | Karma / "The Woman-ness to Realize Where You Went Wrong" (South Africa) | 13 June 2011 | 336,000 | 386,000 | 160,000 | 143,000 | 136,000 | 1,161,000 | #7 | |
| 6 | "The Last Team Will Spend the Night in the Dungeon" (Netherlands and Czech Republic) | 20 June 2011 | 337,000 | 410,000 | 199,000 | 112,000 | 155,000 | 1,213,000 | #7 | |
| 7 | Czech Ferrari's / "It's Just Like Where's Wally" (Czech Republic) | 27 June 2011 | 312,000 | 352,000 | 149,000 | 123,000 | 140,000 | 1,075,000 | #7 | |
| 8 | Polish Nightmares / "At Least the View's Nice" (Poland) | 4 July 2011 | 271,000 | 344,000 | 167,000 | 110,000 | 141,000 | 1,032,000 | #8 | |
| 9 | Desert Odyssey / "When I Saw Everyone Freezing to Death" (Israel) | 11 July 2011 | 301,000 | 335,000 | 149,000 | 97,000 | 157,000 | 1,039,000 | #9 | |
| 10 | Pilgrims Trail / "I Hope We Don't Have to Wear a Crown of Thorns" (Israel) | 18 July 2011 | 303,000 | 344,000 | 175,000 | 125,000 | 177,000 | 1,124,000 | #7 | |
| 11 | "You the Nice Cowboy" (Sri Lanka) | 25 July 2011 | 253,000 | 333,000 | 143,000 | 118,000 | 117,000 | 963,000 | #10 | |
| 12 | Finale / "You're Good at Spending Money" (Singapore and Australia) | 1 August 2011 | 293,000 | 408,000 | 162,000 | 121,000 | 211,000 | 1,195,000 | #6 | |
