= Judean Plain =

Judean Plain may refer to:

- Judean Coastal Plain, another name for the Central Coastal Plain, Israel
- Shfela, a transitional hilly region between the Judean mountains and the coastal plain, Israel
- Both of the above taken as a single geographical area
