= List of beaches in Palestine =

This is an incomplete list of beaches in Palestine broken down by bodies of water they are on.

== Mediterranean Sea ==
List of beaches along the Mediterranean Sea: see Gaza Strip.

== Dead Sea ==
List of beaches along the West Bank shore of the Dead Sea. The beaches listed here are operated by Israeli owners, with mixed staff and open access.

- Biankini Besiesta Beach – near Kalya, West Bank
- (New) Kalia Beach – near Kalya, West Bank
- Neve Midbar beach – near Kalya, West Bank

=== Closed indefinitely due to sinkholes ===
- Mineral Beach – near Mitzpe Shalem, West Bank. The beach was closed for renovations as of 1 January 2015 and until further notice.

== See also ==
- List of beaches
- List of beaches in Israel
