= Israeli coastal plain =

Narrow coastal plain along Israel's Mediterranean Sea coast

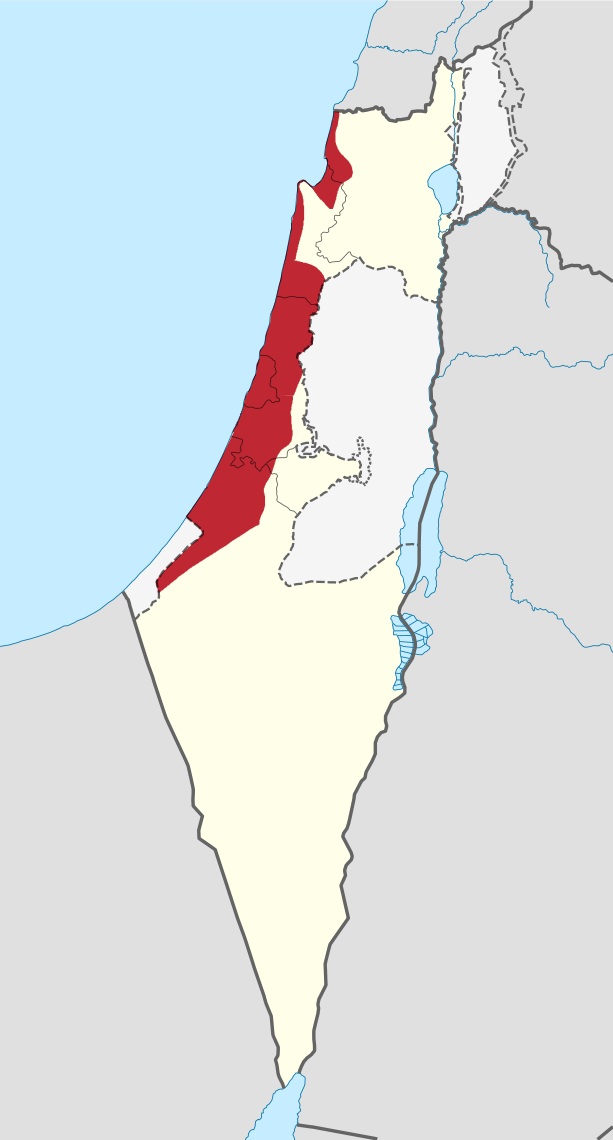
Israeli Coastal Plain region (red) in Israel (yellow)

The Israeli coastal plain (Hebrew: מישור החוף, romanized: Mishor HaḤof, lit. 'coastal plain') is the Israeli segment of the Levantine coastal plain of the Mediterranean Sea, extending 187 kilometres (116 mi) north to south. It is a geographical region defined morphologically by the sea, in terms of topography and soil, and also in its climate, flora and fauna. It is narrow in the north and broadens considerably towards the south, and is continuous, except the short section where Mount Carmel reaches almost all the way to the sea. The Coastal Plain is bordered to the east by – north to south – the topographically higher regions of the Galilee, the low and flat Jezreel Valley, the Carmel range, the mountains of Samaria, the hill country of Judea known as the Shephelah, and the Negev Mountains in the south. To the north it is separated from the coastal plain of Lebanon by the cliffs of Rosh HaNikra, which jut out into the sea from the Galilee mountains, but to the south it continues into the Sinai Peninsula.

The plain can be conventionally divided into a number of areas: the Northern Coastal Plain borders the Galilee in its northern part, and the Jezreel Valley in its southern part between Akko and Haifa, where it is also called the Plain of Zebulon; Hof HaCarmel, or the Carmel Coastal Plain, runs along the Mount Carmel range; the Sharon Plain continues down to northern Tel Aviv; the Central Coastal Plain stretches from Tel Aviv to the northern limit of the Gaza Strip, with the Nahal Shikma stream as its limit – there Israel's access to the Mediterranean ends and the Israeli Southern Coastal Plain, also known as the Western Negev, actually consists of the hinterland of the Strip. For almost its entire length, the plain has sandy beaches, and a Mediterranean climate, except at its southern end where the climate is semi-arid.

== Physical geography ==
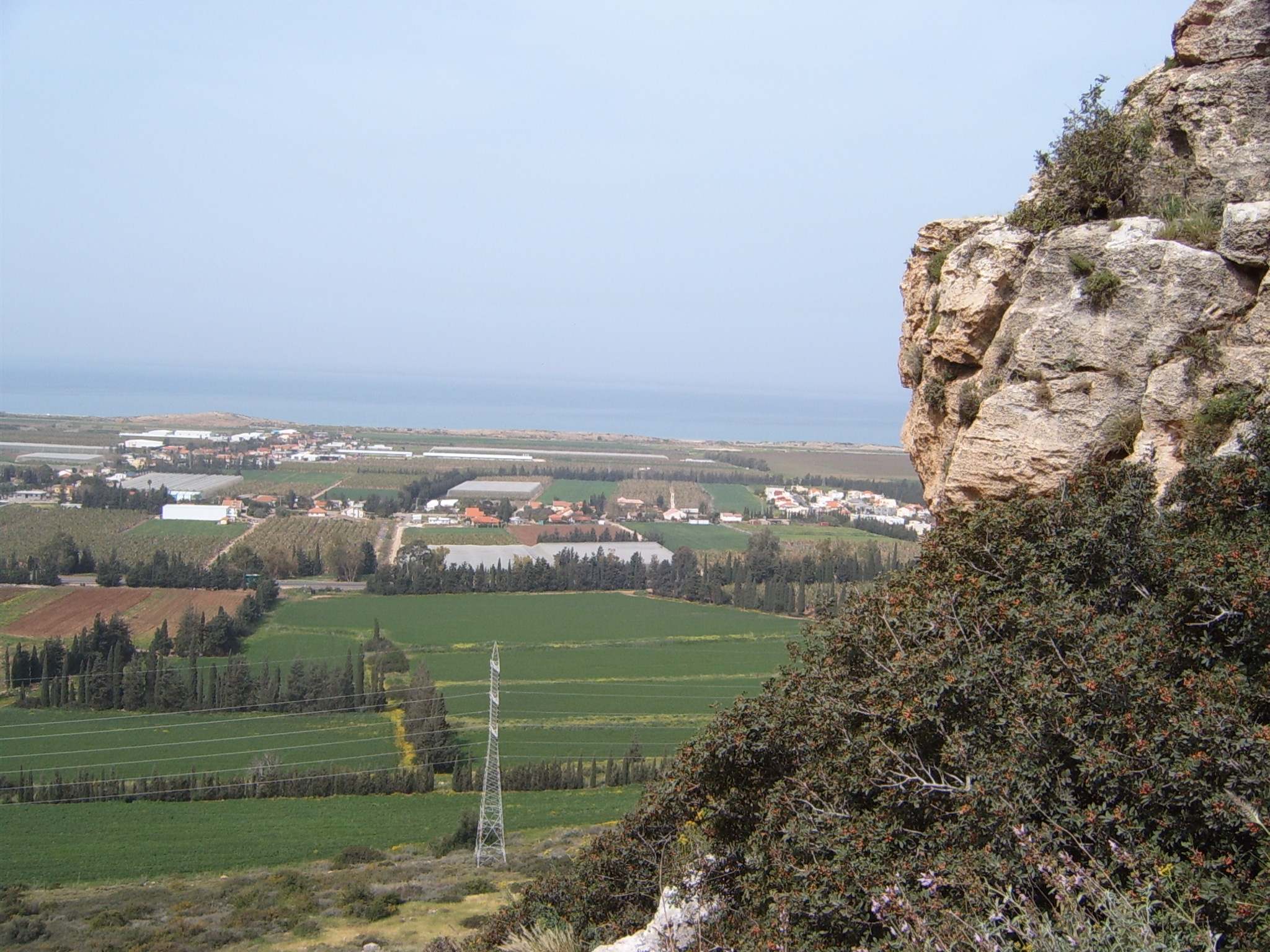
The view from Mount Carmel across the Coastal Plain to the Mediterranean Sea

The area was historically fertile in Biblical times, some of it being continually farmed ever since, although much turned over time into swampland, having to be converted back by Zionist pioneers. Today, the area is the center of the country's citrus farms, and contains some of the country's most successful agricultural settlements. The plain has soils made of two sorts of thick river deposits; one dark and heavy – ideal for growing field crops, and the other thin and sandy – ideal for growing citrus fruits.

Despite its length, the plain is only crossed by two significant rivers; the Yarkon, which is 27 kilometres (17 mi) long flowing from the Petah Tikva area into the Mediterranean, and the Kishon which is 43 kilometres (27 mi) long, flowing into the Gulf of Haifa.

== Human geography ==
About 57% of Israel's population lives in the coastal plain, much of them in the Tel Aviv (Gush Dan) and Haifa metropolitan areas. It is the most predominantly Jewish geographical region of Israel and accordingly the most predominantly Jewish region in the world, as Jews make up over 96% of the population in this region compared to 75% in the Negev, 70% in the Israeli portion of the Judean Mountains, and only 50% in the Galilee, and the Golan Heights.

About 4,320,000 people live on the Israeli Coastal Plain. 4,200,000 million of them are Jews (97.2%), and 120,000 are Israeli Arabs. This accounts for approximately one-third of the world Jewish population, and almost three-quarters of Israeli Jews.

The Israeli Coastal Plain has been populated for thousands of years, with the Pre-Pottery Neolithic B (PPNB) village of Atlit-Yam dating back some 9000 years. The PPNB village was swallowed by the sea due to a rise in sea level caused by the melting glaciers at the end of the last Ice Age. Recent research has concluded that 5,500 years ago, during the Bronze Age, the Coastal Plain was a populated commercial and settlement center, and it is thought that at this time climate change led to the flooding of the area and the creation of many swamps, forcing a shift in human settlement patterns.

== Regions ==
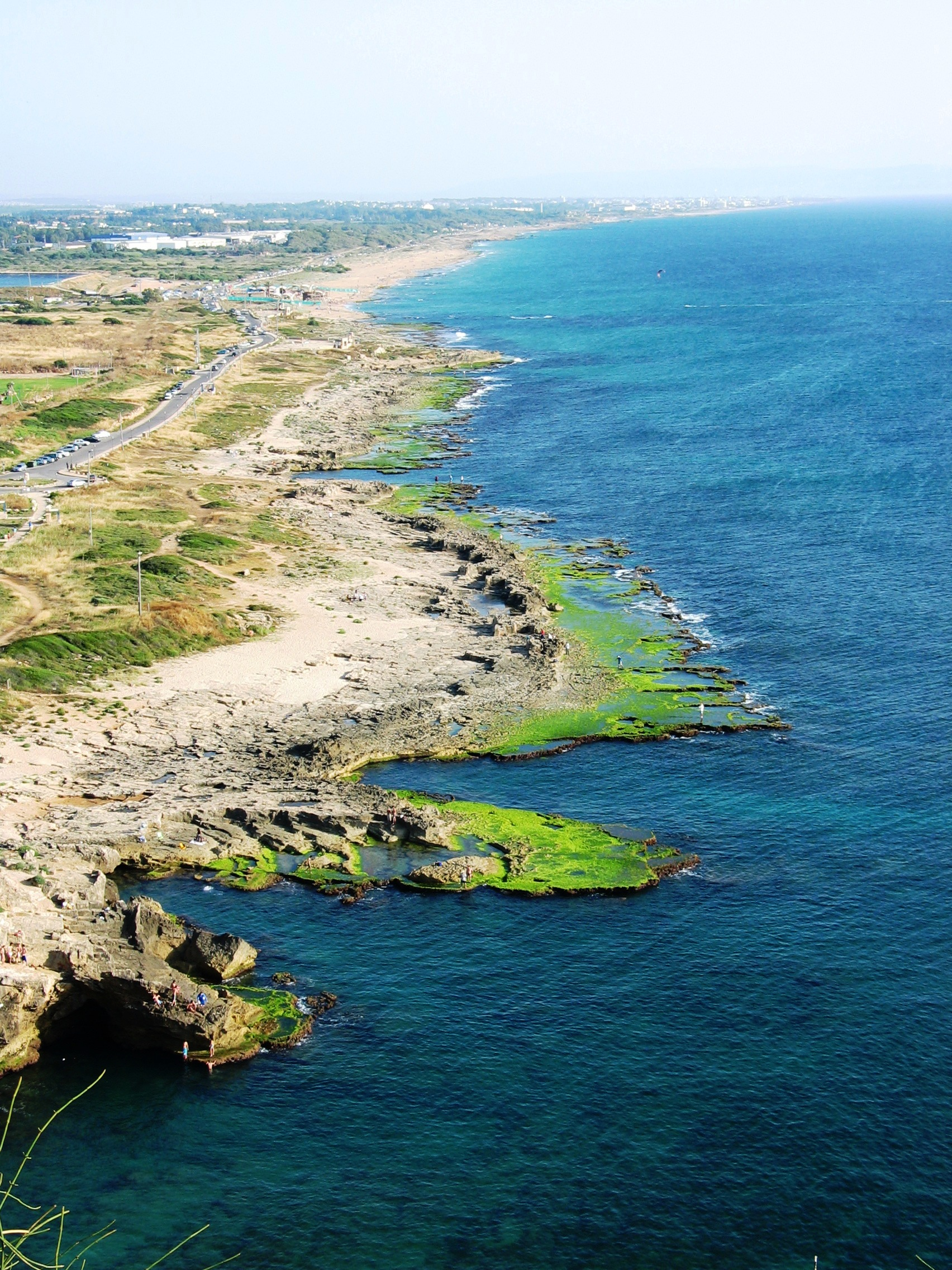
The rocky coastline of Rosh HaNikra in the far north of the country

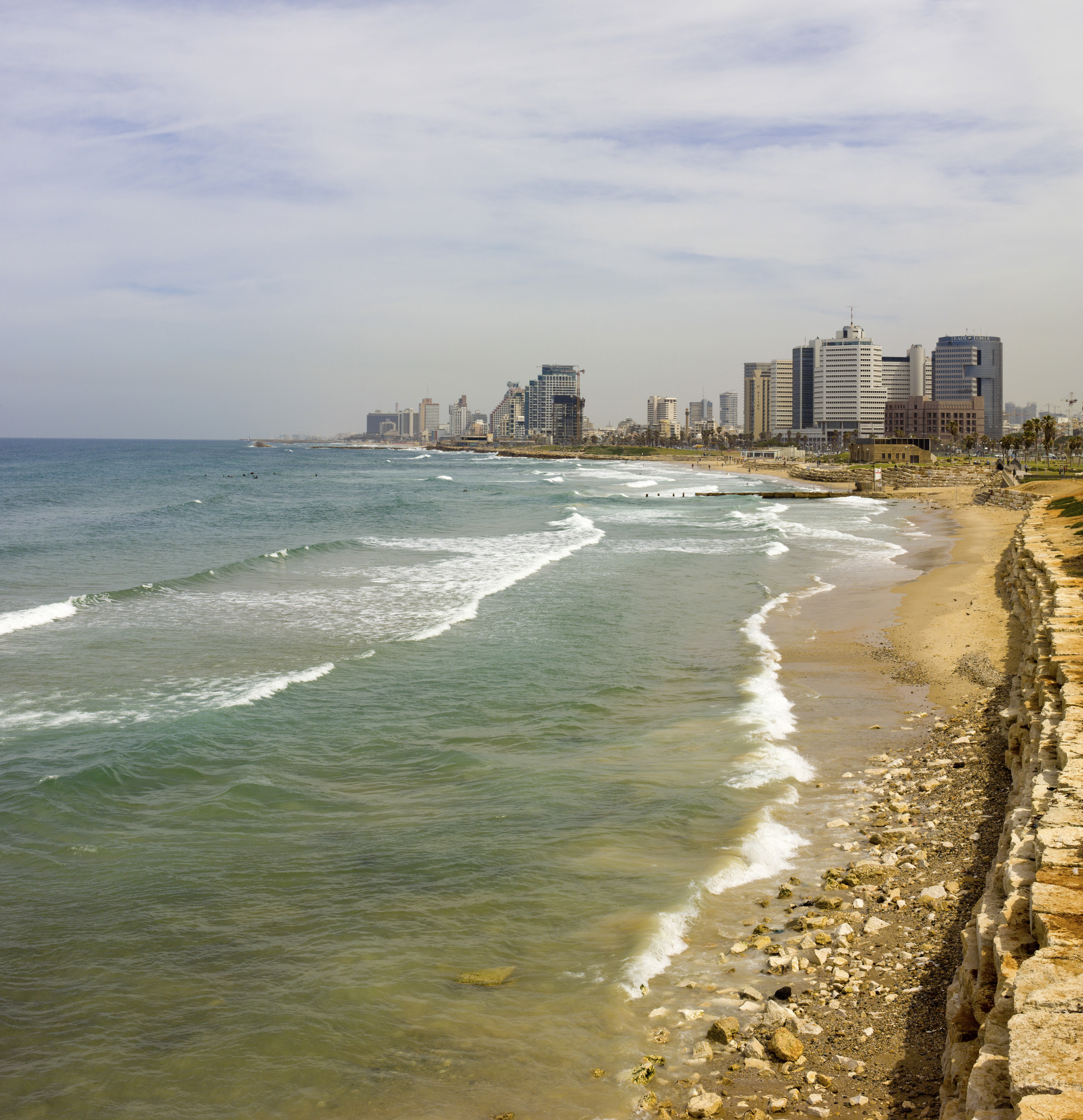
Tel Aviv's coastline (seen from Jaffa) is highly urbanized

The coastal plain includes the following geographical regions (from north to south):

=== Northern Coastal Plain ===
The Northern Coastal Plain or Plain of Asher stretches from Israel's third-largest city, Haifa, northwards to Rosh HaNikra on the Israel-Lebanon border. It separates the Western Galilee and the Jezreel Valley from the Mediterranean. Its southern segment borders the Jezreel Valley and is known as the Plain of Zebulun. It is a fertile region containing the city of Nahariya and many moshavim and kibbutzim. There are many small islands and islets off the coast in this region. Often regarded as a separate region is the Acre coastal plain, which is crowded with urban areas including Acre and the northern suburbs of Haifa, known as the Krayot, as well as more agricultural areas.

=== Hof HaCarmel ===
The Hof HaCarmel (lit. "Carmel Coast") region is the Northern Coastal Plain section stretching along the Mount Carmel range, from Haifa (more exactly: Rosh HaCarmel, the Mount Carmel cape that reaches almost all the way to the sea), down to Nahal Taninim south of Zikhron Ya'akov. The soil of the Hof HaCarmel plain is rich and apart from the main city of Haifa in the north, most settlement here is made up of farming communities. The Hof HaCarmel Regional Council is an administrative unit which largely, but not fully, corresponds to the Hof HaCarmel geographic region.

=== Sharon Plain ===
The Sharon plain is the next stage down the Coastal Plain, running from Nahal Taninim (Zikhron Ya'akov) to Tel Aviv's Yarkon River. This area is Israel's most densely populated, containing a number of large towns and cities including Netanya and Herzliya as well as smaller communities inland.

=== Central Coastal Plain ===
The Israel's Central Coastal Plain also known as Judean Coastal Plain, is running from northern Tel Aviv's Yarkon River to the northern tip of the Gaza Strip marked by Nahal Shikma, the Central Coastal Plain contains cities such as Bat Yam, Rishon LeZion, Ashdod and Ashkelon, as well as agricultural communities.

=== Southern Coastal Plain ===
The Southern Coastal Plain, also known as the Negev Coastal Plain, extends south and southwest from the mouth of Nahal Lachish and merges with the coastal plain of the Sinai Peninsula. The physical geographical region crosses political boundaries, encompassing parts of Israel and the Gaza Strip.

The Israeli Southern Coastal Plain is divided into two subdivisions:

- the Besor region, a savanna-type area with a relatively large number of communities, in the north
- the Agur-Halutza region in the south which is very sparsely populated.

== See also ==
- List of beaches in Israel
