= Claudette Schreuders =

South African artist

- Born: February 6, 1973 (age 53); Pretoria, South Africa
- Education: Michaelis School of Fine Art, University of Cape Town University of Stellenbosch
- Occupation: Artist
- Website: Claudette Schreuders

Claudette Schreuders (born February 6, 1973) is a South African sculptor and painter operating out of Cape Town, South Africa. She is known mainly for her carved and painted wooden figures, which have been exhibited independently and internationally in galleries and museums. She is the first South African artist to have a sculpture acquired by the Metropolitan Museum of Art. Schreuders has been a finalist for both the Daimler Chrysler Award (South Africa) and the FNB Vita Art Prize (South Africa), which is South Africa's version of the Turner Prize.

== Early life and education ==
Schreuders was born in Pretoria (Tshwane), Gauteng Province, South Africa on 6 February 1973. She is first-generation South African born to Dutch parents. Schreuders' adolescence was during the period leading up to the end of apartheid in 1994.

She attended Linden High School in Johannesburg and graduated in 1990. She attended Stellenbosch University, where she graduated with a Bachelor of Fine Arts in 1994, after which she attended the Michaelis School of Fine Art at the University of Cape Town for her Master of Fine Arts (1997).

== Career ==
Schreuders began exhibiting her work in 1998, with a show titled Family Tree. Her earliest bodies of work were Burnt by the Sun (2001), Crying in Public (2002), The Long Day (2004), and The Fall (2007). She began exclusively with wood carving but has since expanded to produce bronze sculptures, lithographic prints, etchings, and drawings.

Her work has been shown in the Museum of Modern Art, the Metropolitan Museum of Art, the National Museum of African Art at the Smithsonian Institution, the Nobel Peace Center, the British Museum, and the Fowler Museum at the University of California, Los Angeles. She has two public sculptures. One is in Cape Town's Nobel Square: statues of the four South African Nobel Peace Prize laureates Nelson Mandela, FW de Klerk, Archbishop Desmond Tutu and Albert Lutuli. The other is in the Aga Kahn Walk in Nairobi, Kenya: a seven-foot wooden figure titled Thomas.

== Style ==
Two Hands by Claudette Schreuders. Jelutong wood and enamel paint, 31 1/8 x 18 1/2 x 12 5/8 in. (79.1 x 47 x 32.1 cm). Purchased by the Metropolitan Museum of Art.

Her work has been praised as a "mastery of carving" by the Metropolitan Museum of Art and compared to the work of the other sculptors Jeff Koons and William Kentridge. It has also been described as an "exploration of self-identity, cultural discomfort and a strong if clouded spirituality" and the depiction of figures who appear "monolithic, stoic and timeless" and "reflect the ambiguities of the search for an 'African' identity in the post-apartheid era" and "the malleability of an African identity in the wake of apartheid." Art critic Okwui Enwezor has said that her work "proposes a new language resulting from a synthesis of African and European figural forms."

Her wooden figures rarely deviate from what Schreuders has established as her personal style. First, her work is often autobiographical. Her first six bodies of work represented different phases of her life: her graduate show reflected her life as a student; her second collection reflected her time in residencies in foreign countries; her third reflected on the reception of her work, and the following works concerned the birth of her first child and domestic life. Schreuders states that “I enjoy art in which you can see the life where it comes from. Art that is solely about art is not as attractive to me as when there is life outside the work.” The wood she often uses to carve her figures is jacaranda; a wood readily available in Pretoria, her hometown. Second, the bodies are "stocky figures with slightly oversized heads and hands, carved in wood and rendered with enamel paint." Third, her work has "small solitary figures with the aura of invisible or indeterminate narrative silences [and] generally expressionless faces that mask any overt or strong feelings." Fourth, her depictions of everyday South African life comment on the residue of South Africa's colonial past and her own relationship with South African history. For instance, one sculpture is of "a black woman with a white child on her back" and "the child is built up out of cuts, as if the child is going to fall apart into slices the moment the woman unties the blanket." Fifth her figures often have "vacant stares" and a "rigidity, even paralysis of movement" communicating that "all is not what it seems."

== Influences ==
Her wood carved statues often begin from a single piece of wood, akin to traditional African art practices, especially the West African colon statues and Baule Blolo sculptures native to the Ivory Coast. Colon sculptures originated as figures for indigenous rituals, but as decolonization infiltrated African society Europeans began having them commissioned as portraits of themselves. Christopher Steiner explains the importance of colon figures as a "symbol of social status ... [whose] very ownership by a Western signifies the reappropriation of Africa and is thus prized as an image that pays homage to the conquest of the continent." Schreuders has stated that the colon figures "were crucial to me in how I wanted my sculptures to look" due to their living quality.

== Exhibits and Residences ==
Notable Solo Exhibitions
Title	Location	Year
In the Bedroom	Jack Shainman Gallery, New York, USA	2019
Note to Self	Jack Shainman Gallery, New York, USA	2016
Great Expectations	Stevenson, Cape Town, South Africa	2013
Close, Close	Jack Shainman Gallery, New York, USA	2011
The Long Day: Sculpture by Claudette Schreuders	University Art Gallery, San Diego State University, San Diego, California; Hand Art Center, Richmond, Virginia; Atlanta College of Art Gallery, Atlanta, Georgia, USA; Warren Siebrits, Johannesburg, South Africa; Arizona State University Art Museum, Tempe, Arizona	2005
Claudette Schreuders: Six Stories	Klein Karoo National Arts Festival, Oudtshoorn, South Africa	2002

Notable Group Exhibitions
Title	Location	Year
9 More Weeks	Stevenson Gallery, Johannesburg, South Africa	2018
Impressions from South Africa, 1965 to Now	Museum of Modern Art, New York, USA	2011
Strength and Convictions: The Life and Times of the South African Nobel Peace Prize Laureates	Iziko South African National Gallery, Cape Town, South Africa; Nobel Peace Center, Oslo, Norway	2009
Mami Wata: Arts for Water Spirits in Africa and its Diasporas	Fowler Museum at UCLA, Los Angeles; Chazen Museum of Art, University of Wisconsin, Madison; National Museum of African Art, Smithsonian Institution, Washington DC; Mariners' Museum, Newport News, Virginia; Cantor Center for Visual Arts, Stanford University, California, USA	2008
Since 2000: Printmaking Now	Museum of Modern Art, New York, USA	2006
Conversation with Art, on Art - Bauhaus to Contemporary Art: From the Daimler Chrysler Art Collection	Tokyo Opera City Art Gallery, Japan	2006
Personal Affects: Power and Poetics In Contemporary South African Art	Museum for African Art and Cathedral of St. John the Divine, New York, USA	2004
Voices of South Africa	British Museum, London, UK	2000
Liberated Voices: Contemporary Art form South Africa	Museum for African Art, New York; Austin Museum of Art, Texas; Cantor Center for Visual Arts at Stanford University, California; University of Arizona Museum of Art, Tucson, USA	1999
Lake Naivasha International Artists	National Museum, Nairobi, Kenya	1998
Earth and Everything: Recent Art From South Africa	Arnolfini, Bristol; Center for Contemporary Arts, Glasgow; Firstcite Contemporary Art, Colchester, Essex; Wrexham Arts Centre, UK	1997

Notable Collections
Collection	Place
DaimlerChrysler Art Collection	Berlin, Germany
Iziko South African National Gallery	Cape Town, South Africa
Johannesburg Art Gallery	Johannesburg, South Africa
Metropolitan Museum	New York, USA
Michaelis School of Fine Art	University of Cape Town, South Africa
Museum of Modern Art	New York, USA
Parliament of South Africa	Cape Town, South Africa
RBC Dann Rauscher Art Collection	Minneapolis, USA

Residencies
Title	Location	Year
Lux Art Institute Artist Residency	Encinitas, California, USA	2011
Art Omi International Artist Residency	New York, USA	2001
Aftershave International Artists Workshop	Jos, Nigeria	1999
Lake Naivasha International Artist Residency	Kenya	1998
Gasworks Studios International Residency	London, UK	1996

== External Sources ==
Official website
