= Mohammed El-Leissy =

Australian politician and comedian

Mohammed El-leissy

Personal details
- Born: 1985 (age 40–41) Brunswick, Victoria, Australia
- Party: Greens
- Education: RMIT University
- Occupation: Community worker
- Profession: Politician

Mohammed El-leissy (born 1985) is an Australian former politician, comedian, and community worker of Egyptian descent. He is best known for being a contestant on the first series of The Amazing Race Australia in 2011.

== Early life ==
El-leissy's parents came to Australia in the 1960s. He was born in Brunswick, Melbourne, Australia to parents of Egyptian descent, and he grew up in Canberra. In 2010, El-leissy graduated from RMIT University with a degree in Youth Work.

== Radio and television career ==
El-leissy has spoken extensively around issues of multiculturalism and community issues in Australia. He has appeared on Sky News, Sunrise, The Project on Network Ten, SBS's Insight as well as a regular contributor to ABC's News Breakfast. Along with having written for the Herald Sun and ABC's The Drum.

From 2005 to 2010, El-leissy hosted a variety of community radio programs on both Student Youth Network and 3CR. He was also a board member of the Community Radio Foundation. He also hosts Kalam TV.

In May 2011, El-leissy appeared as a contest and on the first series of The Amazing Race Australia, Seven's local adaptation of the long-running US series on Channel Seven with his friend Mostafa Haroun (Mos), who works part-time in the gift shop at Melbourne Zoo. They were eliminated after five weeks.

From June to August 2010, El-leissy's television show, Kalam TV, was launched on Channel 31, a 13-episode series challenging Australian perceptions of the Arab world through an entertaining mixture of variety and comedy.

== Stand-up career ==
Mohammed "Mo" El-leissy

Comedy career
- Years active: 2010–present
- Medium: Stand-up
- Genres: Observational humour, Self-deprecation, Satire, Character comedy
- Subjects: Stereotypes, Racism, Islamic humour

In 2007, El-leissy became a state-finalist in the Triple J Raw Comedy Award competition and went on later that year to perform in the Fear of a Brown Planet show. In 2008, he performed in Who is Abdul Smith at Melbourne Fringe Festival.

In April 2009, he performed Greens fundraising comedy act Mo the Plumber with Rucker Ward's Greens Councillor at the time Trent McCarthy. In 2011, he performed his comedy show World Mix Tape. He performed both shows at the Melbourne Fringe Festival and Melbourne International Comedy Festival.

In late 2012, he performed at Falls Festival in Victoria, Tasmania and Western Australia.

== Political career ==
In 2008, El-leissy was the Greens candidate in the Darebin Council elections.

In April 2011, 12 months after his pre-selection and only one month before the election, he withdrew from contesting the 27 November State Election.

== Other work ==
Since 2006, El-leissy has been a multicultural youth worker. He previously worked as a community worker with the Islamic Council Victoria.

He sits on the National Leaders Group for the White Ribbon Foundation as well as the Victorian Multicultural Commission's Regional Advisory Council for North West Metro.

From 2007 to 2009, he was a member of the Victorian Premier's Multifaith Multicultural Youth Network and was a participant of the Governor's Roundtable into Multicultural Policy. In 2009 he was a speaker at the International Parliament of World Religions. In 2007 to 2008, he was also a board member of EastWeb, an organisation helping to provide small grants to disadvantaged community organisations.

In 2008, he visited Indonesia as a participant of DFAT's Australia-Indonesia Muslim exchange program. In 2011, he was invited at the request of the State Department to visit the United States as part of the International Visitors Leadership Program and toured seven cities meeting political, community and religious leaders.

El-leissy is also qualified imam.

== Personal life ==
In 2010, El-leissy visited Egypt, the country of his descent, for the first time.
