= Statue of Vitus, Charles Bridge =

Statue in Prague, Czech Republic

Coordinates: 50°05′13″N 14°24′28″E

Statue of Vitus
- Socha svatého Víta (Czech)
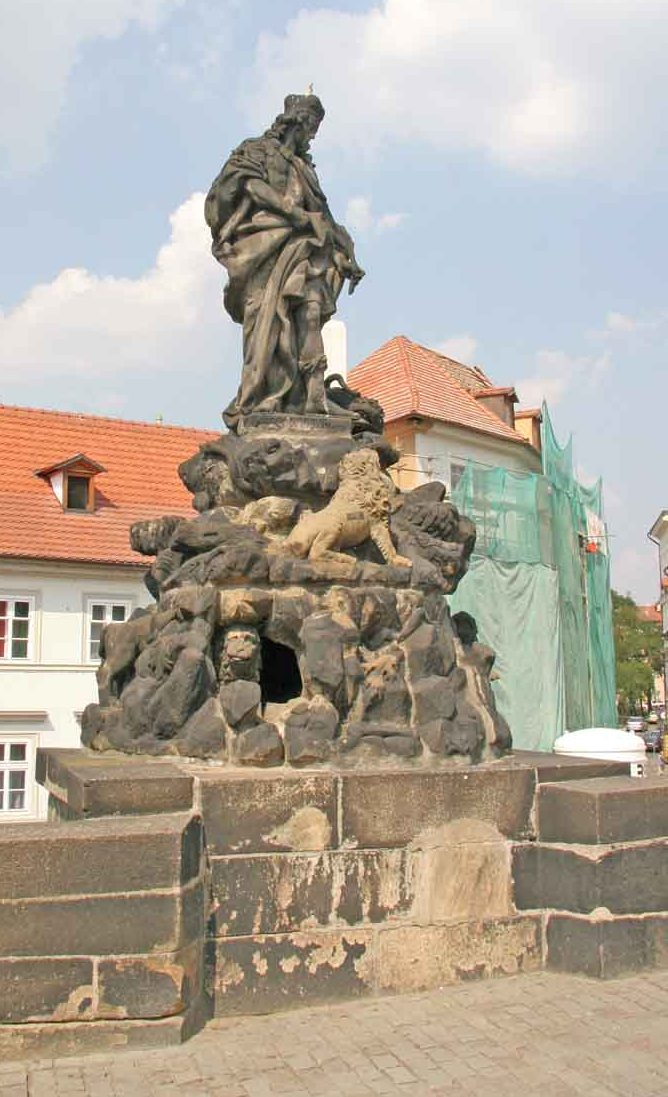
- The statue in 2006
- Artist: Ferdinand Brokoff
- Subject: Vitus
- Location: Prague, Czech Republic

A statue of Vitus (Czech: Socha svatého Víta) by Ferdinand Brokoff is installed on the north side of the Charles Bridge in Prague, Czech Republic, depicting Saint Vitus.
