= Powder Tower, Prague =

Powder Tower
- Prašná brána
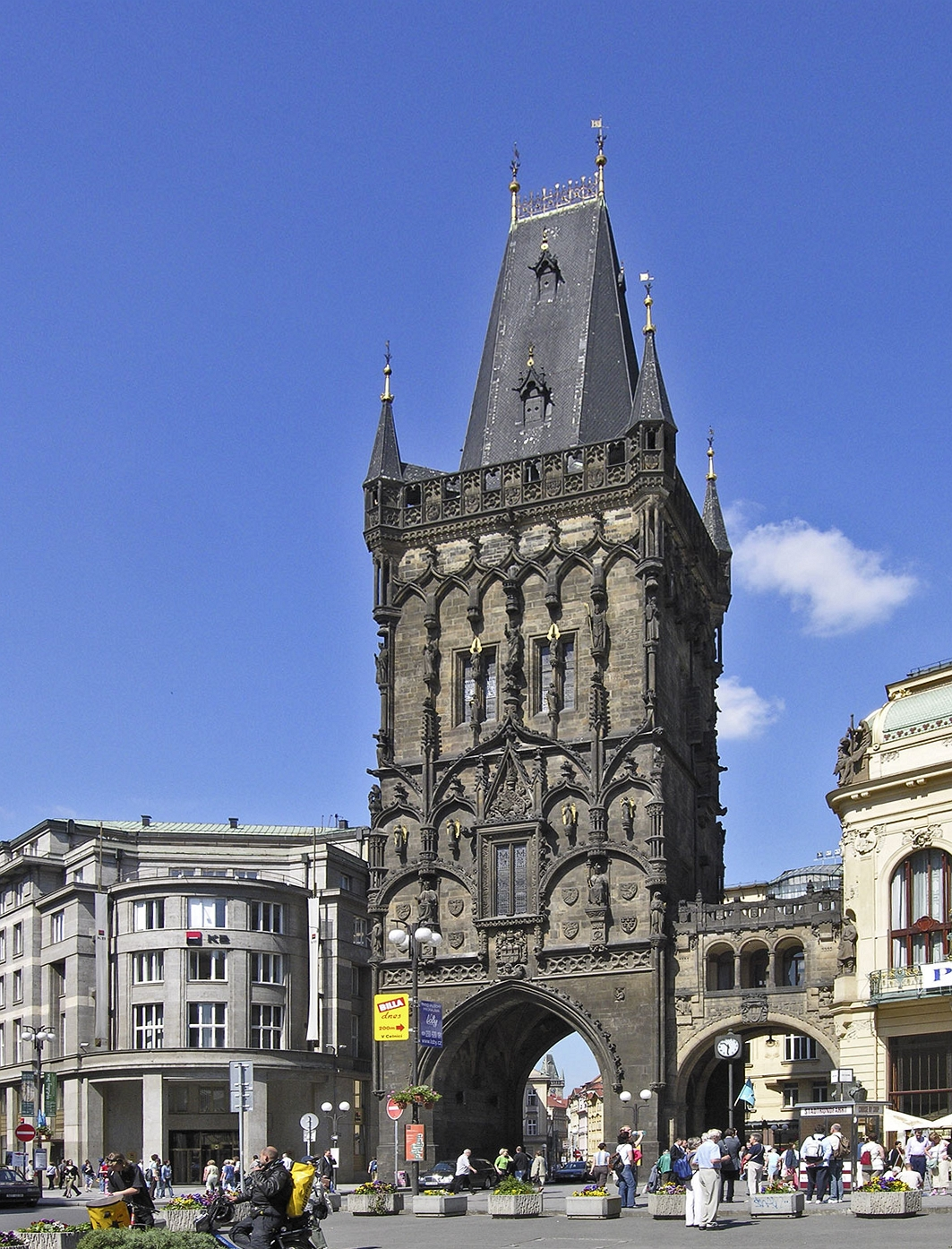
- Powder Gate
- Alternative names: Powder Gate

General information
- Type: Tower
- Architectural style: Gothic
- Location: Prague, Czech Republic
- Coordinates: 50.0872°N 14.4278°E
- Construction started: 1475
- Renovated: 1876

Height
- Height: 65 meters

The Powder Tower or Powder Gate (Czech: Prašná brána) is a Gothic tower in Prague, Czech Republic. It is one of the original city gates. It separates the Old Town from the New Town.

Powder Tower, as with many historical sites in Prague, undergoes periodic preservation and restoration. The most recent treatment began Summer 2024 and is scheduled to be completed in October. Jiří Pospíšil, Deputy Mayor for Culture and Tourism stated "It is our duty to take care of Prague's heritage buildings, which are a symbol of Prague and the legacy of our ancestors ... Now, in cooperation with Prague City Tourism, we are starting the repair of the Powder Tower, and I am very happy that the tower will have a literal new coat."

== History ==
The Powder Tower is one of the original 13 city gates in Old Town, Prague. Its construction began in 1475. The tower was intended to be an attractive entrance into the city, instead of a defensive tower. The foundation stone was placed by Vladislav II. The city council gave Vladislav II the tower as a coronation gift. While it was being built, it was called the New Tower. The look of the tower was inspired by the work of Peter Parler on the Charles Bridge.

Vladislav II had to relocate due to riots, so the tower building stopped. He returned in 1485 to live back in Prague Castle, where he lived for the rest of his life, along with the rest of the Kings of Bohemia who lived in Prague. Kings would not return to use the tower or Royal Court until using it for coronation ceremonies starting again in 1836, where they would pass through the tower to go to St. Vitus Cathedral.

Despite its name the Powder Tower was never used to store gunpowder. The gate suffered considerable damage during the Battle of Prague. The sculptures on the tower were replaced in 1876 during the reconstruction performed by Josef Mocker and the clock was removed from it.

== Gallery ==
The tower before 1892, photo by František Fridrich

The tower between 1880 and 1893, photo by Karel Ferdinand Bellmann
