= Nobel Square =

Public square in Cape Town, South Africa

Coordinates: 33.906583°S 18.419722°E

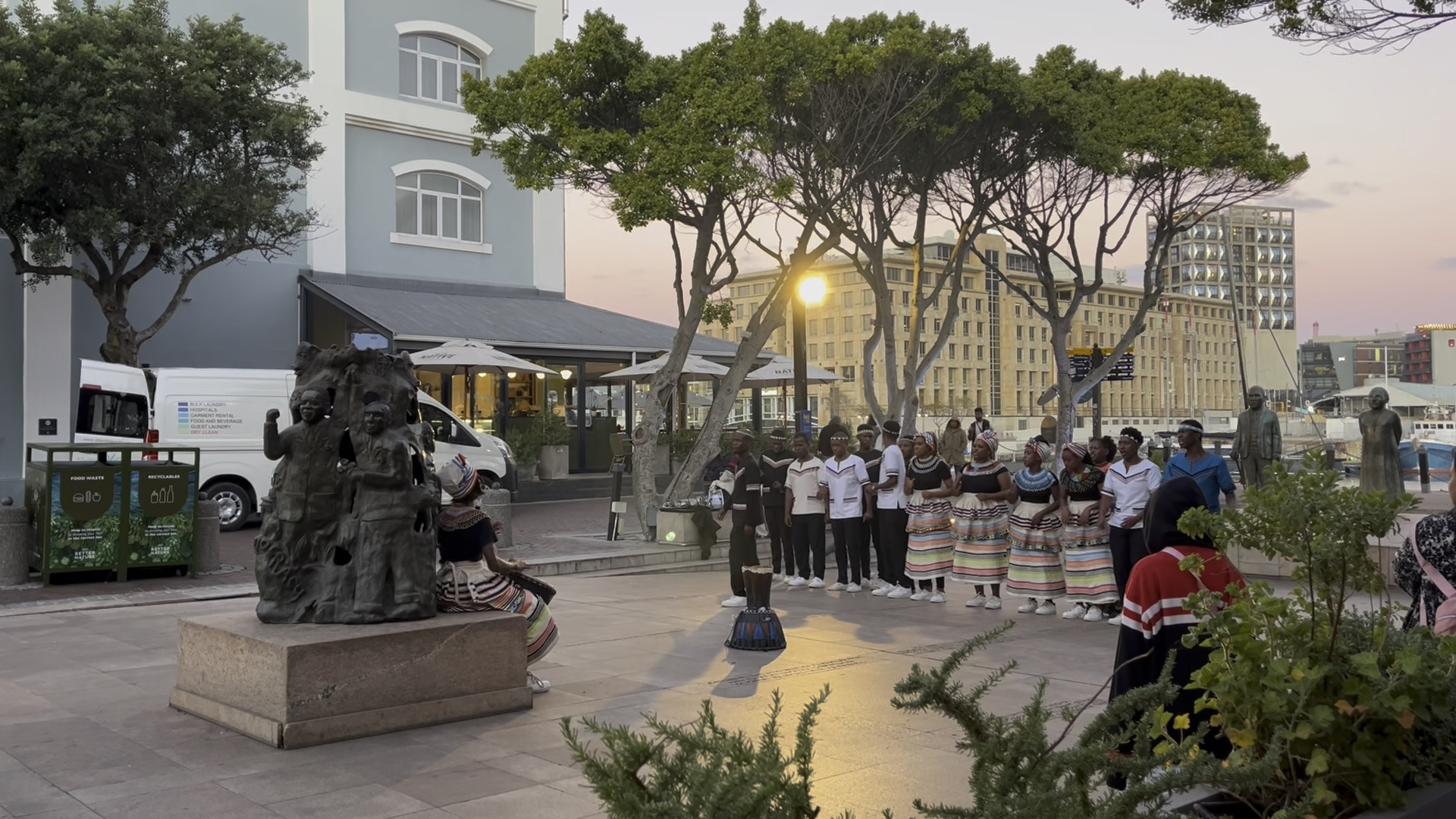
Nobel Square

Nobel Square is a public square in the Victoria & Alfred Waterfront neighborhood of Cape Town, South Africa. It opened in December 2005 and includes sculptures of the country's four Nobel Peace Prize winners, Albert Lutuli, Desmond Tutu, F. W. de Klerk, and Nelson Mandela. The square was the brainchild of Ebrahim Rasool, Premier of Western Cape from 2004 to 2008, and his predecessor Marthinus van Schalkwyk. Supported by the government of the Western Cape, the project was launched after consultations with Lutuli's family and the still-living Prize winners, who attended the unveiling with Lutuli's daughter and the Norwegian Ambassador to South Africa. The statues, slightly taller than the four people depicted, are arranged in a semicircle with their backs to Table Mountain. Quotes of each figure are inscribed on the ground in front of them. A fifth sculpture, entitled "Peace and Democracy," represents the role of women and children in the anti-apartheid movement. All four sculptures are bronze and stand on a 386-m^{2} granite surface. A competition invited ten artists from around South Africa to submit proposals, with Claudette Schreuders's entry inspiring the four sculptures of Nobel winners and Noria Mabasa's idea selected for "Peace and Democracy."
