= List of beaches in Israel =

This is an incomplete list of beaches in Israel broken down by bodies of water they are on. These beaches are known for their clear blue water along four distinct bodies of water around Israel. In total there are 137 beaches in Israel.

== Red Sea ==
List of beaches along the Red Sea, also known in Israel as the Reed Sea, located in southern Israel:

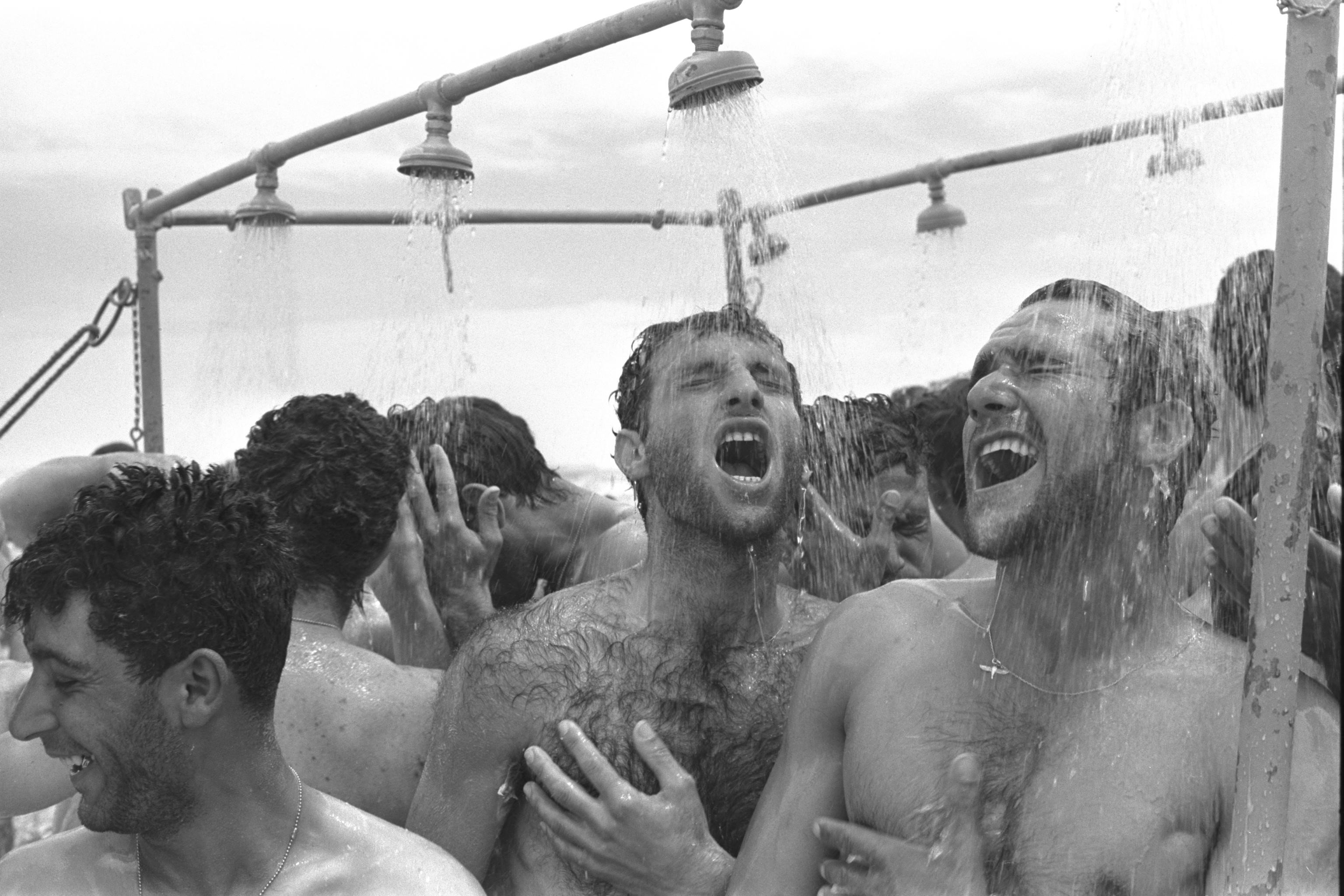
Israeli soldiers enjoy a field shower near Eilat in 1967

- 9Beach – Opened in Eilat in 2009 is located near a number of bars and the mall.
- Bar Beach – Located in Eilat is a small beach located near a reef.
- Club Med Beach – Located in southern Eilat is open to hotel guests and the public, and offers basketball and tennis courts, volleyball, archery targets, wind surfing, snorkeling and a dance floor.
- Coral Beach – Located in the Coral Beach Nature Reserve in Eilat
- Dan Hotel Beach – Is a private beach in northern Eilat, owned privately by Dan Hotels for the guests.
- Dekel Beach – Located in Eilat is best known for its Friday night Kabbalat Shabbat service.
- Dolphin Reef Beach – Located in Eilat near the Dolphin Reef
- Electric Company Beach – Located in Eilat offers marine equipment rentals.
- Golden Beach – Known locally as Hof HaZahav is located in Eilat, right near the Dan Hotel Beach.
- HaSh'hafim Beach – Translated as Seagulls Beach enjoy clear blue water due to the lack of boats being allowed in the nearby water.
- Isrotel Princess Hotel Beach – Located in Eilat near Coral Reef with snorkel equipment available for rent.
- Kisuski Beach – Located in Eilat is popular with those who wish to rent water sports equipment and snorkels.
- Migdalor Beach – Located in Eilat right near the Ben-Gurion University of the Negev campus
- Moriah Beach – Located in Eilat in front of the Leonardo Plaza Hotel.
- Royal Beach Hotel Beach – Owned by the Royal Beach Hotel, however is open to the public free of charge.
- Sun Bay Beach – Located in northern Eilat near the border with Jordan.
- Village Beach – Located in southern Eilat is popular due to their large night time beach parties.

== Mediterranean Sea ==
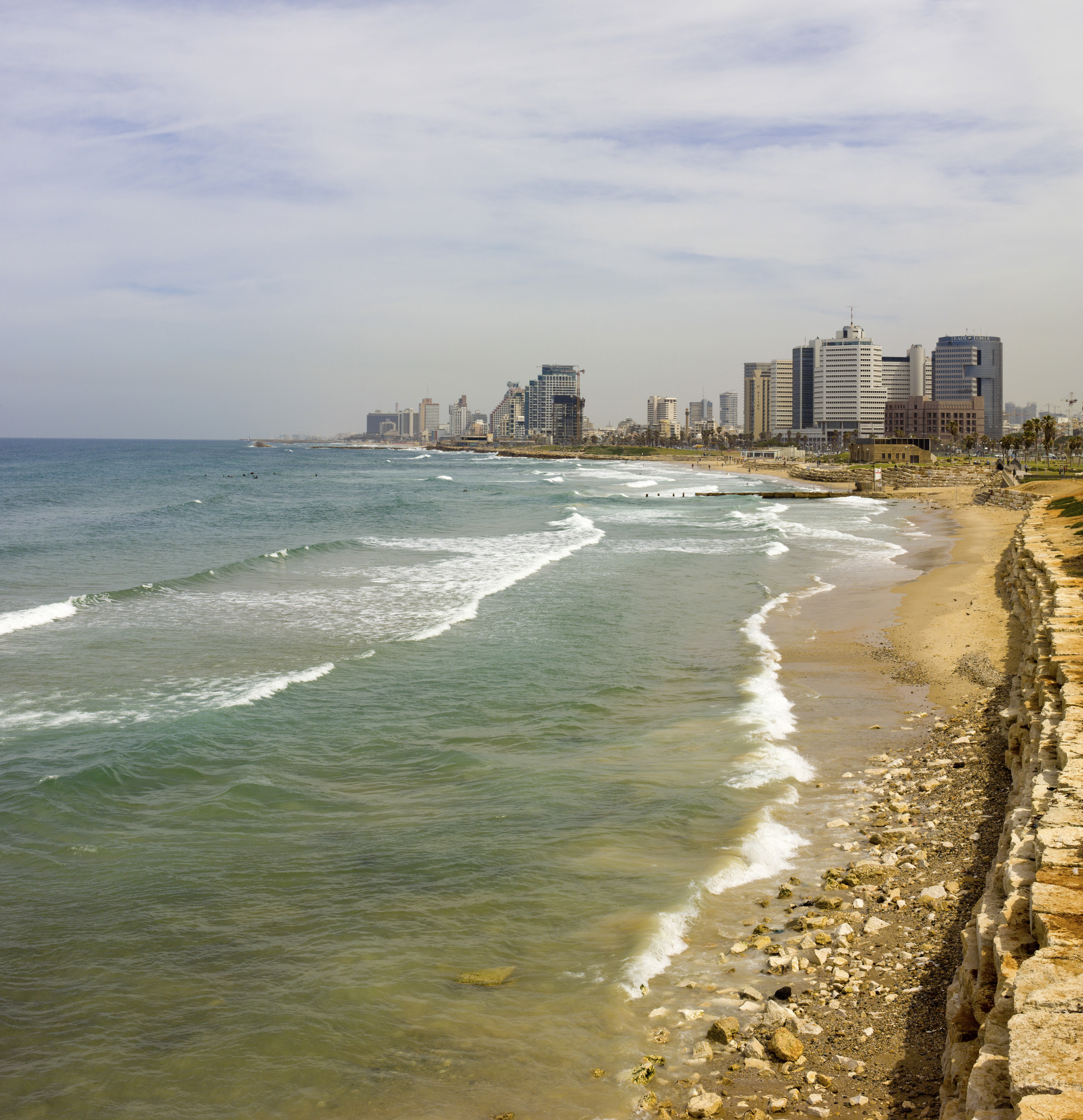
Tel Aviv

List of beaches along the Mediterranean Sea:

- Alma Beach – Located along Tel Aviv’s border with Jaffa.
- Aqueduct Beach – Located along the aqueducts used to bring water to the ancient city of Caesarea and is part of the Caesarea Maritima.
- Banana Beach – Located in Tel Aviv, is very popular among the younger crowd, and movies are shown free of charge on a large screen on the beach at night.
- Bograshov Beach – Located off the promenade in the center of Tel Aviv
- Carmel Beach – Located in Haifa, is popular especially due to its proximity to the Carmel Beach Railway Station
- Charles Clore Beach – Located in Tel Aviv next to Charles Clore Park
- Dado South Beach – Sometimes just called South Beach, is located in Haifa
- Dor Beach – Located in the town of Dor 15 minutes from Haifa
- Drummers Beach – Located at the end of the beach strip in Tel Aviv, gains its name from the large number of drum circles which can often be found there on Friday afternoons.
- Frishman Beach – Located in Tel Aviv near the hotels.
- Givat Aliyah Beach – Located in Jaffa is best known for its large rock formations and arches.
- Gordon Beach – Located on Gordon Street in Tel Aviv, is popular among tourists due to the proximity to the hotels.
- HaBonim Beach – Located in northern Israel and is popular among those who wish to camp overnight on the beach.
- Hilton Beach – Sometimes called Atzmaut Beach; located in Tel Aviv, is the only beach in the city which allows dogs there, and is very popular among the homosexual community.
- Metzitzim Beach – Formerly Sheraton Beach, located in Tel Aviv
- Nahsholim Beach – Located next to kibbutz Nahsholim in northern Israel.
- Nordau Beach – The only beach in Tel Aviv that caters for the religious community, with different days' access for men and women.
- Tzuk Beach – Also known as Cliff Beach, is located in southern Tel Aviv.
- Jerusalem Beach – Despite the name, this beach is located in Tel Aviv.
- Gil's Beach - Located in Ashdod.
- Sandy Beach - Located in Ashdod.
- Mei Ami Beach - Located in Ashdod.
- Lido Beach - Located in Ashdod.
- Miami Beach - Located in Ashdod.
- Oranim Beach - Located in Ashdod.
- Palmahim Beach - Located in Palmahim.
- HaKshatot Beach - Located in Ashdod.
- Yud-Alef Beach - Located in Ashdod.
- Reviera Beach - Located in Ashdod.
- Nitzanim Beach – Located south of Ashdod.
- Hasela Beach - Located in Ashkelon.
- Hofit Beach - Located in Ashkelon.
- Barnea Beach - Located in Ashkelon.
- Ha-Gan Beach - Located in Ashkelon.
- Bar Kohba Beach - Located in Ashkelon.
- Delila Beach - Located in Ashkelon.
- Zikim Beach – Located south of Ashkelon.
- Sironit Beach – Located in Netanya.
- Poleg Beach – Located in Netanya.
- Amphi Beach – Located in Netanya.
- Onot Beach – Located in Netanya.

== Dead Sea ==
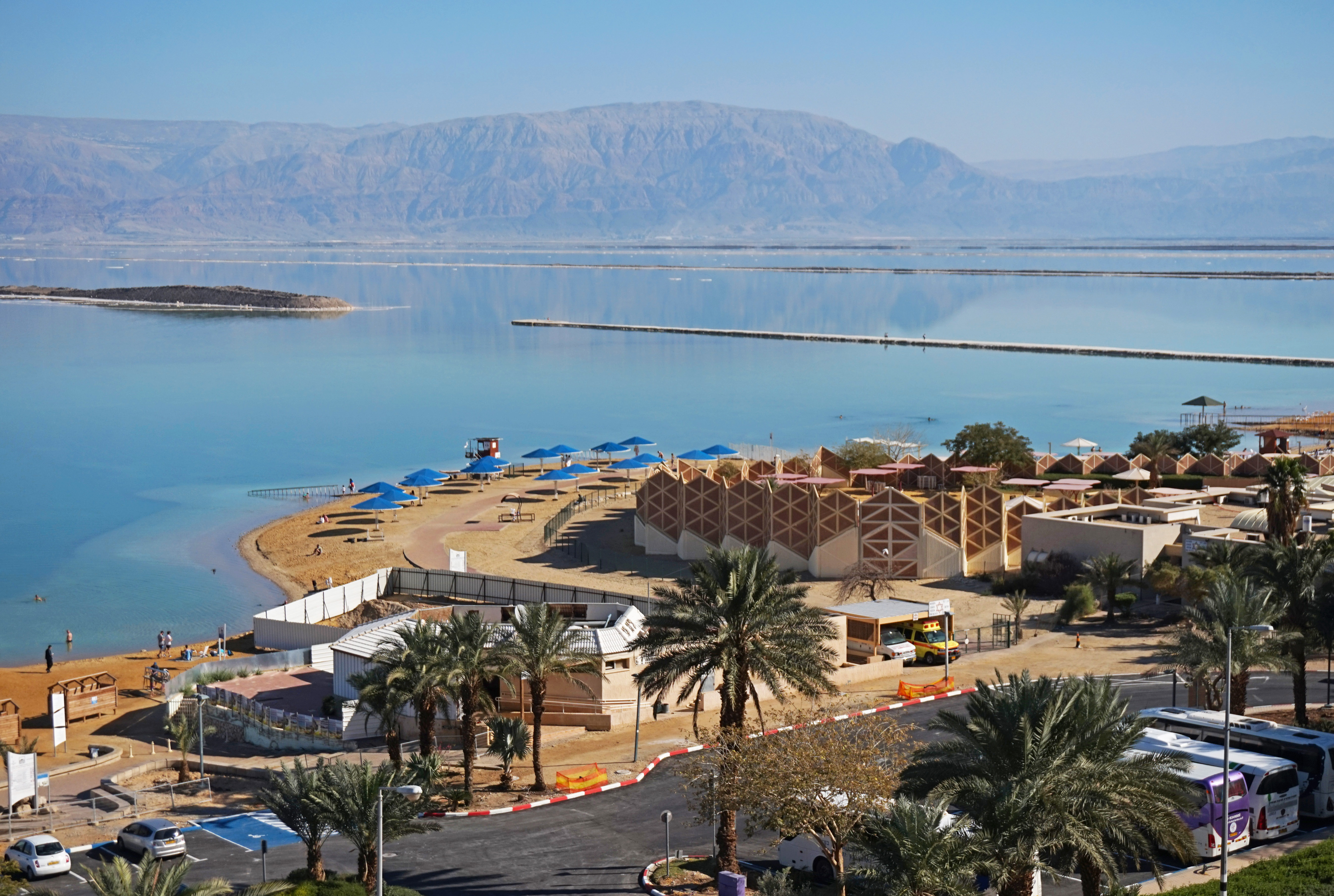
Ein Bokek

List of beaches along the Dead Sea:

=== Northern basin ===
For the beaches on the West Bank section of the Dead Sea shore, see List of beaches in Palestine (includes Kalia, Neve Midbar, and Biankini; Mineral Beach is closed indefinitely due to sinkholes).

- Ein Gedi Spa – south of Ein Gedi.

==== Closed due to sinkholes ====
- Ein Gedi Beach – near historical Ein Gedi and north of Ein Gedi Spa, abandoned due to sinkholes.

=== Southern basin resorts ===
- Ein Bokek beach – near the Ein Bokek shopping center, Israel
- Neve Zohar beach, Israel

== Kinneret (Sea of Galilee) ==
List of beaches along the Kinneret, known in English as the Sea of Galilee:

- Ein Gev Resort Village Beach – Located in the Ein Gev Resort

== See also ==
- List of beaches
- Israel national beach soccer team
