= Almog =

Israeli settlement and kibbutz in the West Bank

Almog: אַלְמוֹג (Hebrew)
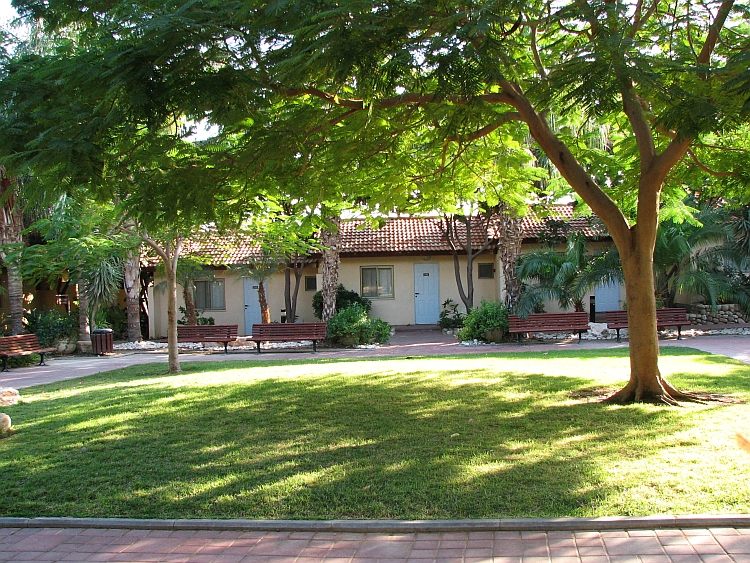

- Location within the Central West Bank
- Coordinates: 31°47′23″N 35°27′40″E
- Country: Palestine
- District: Judea and Samaria Area
- Council: Megilot
- Region: West Bank
- Affiliation: Kibbutz Movement
- Founded: 1977 (Nahal outpost); 1979 (civilian kibbutz)
- Founder: Nahal
- Population (2024): 347

Almog (Hebrew: אַלְמוֹג, lit. 'Coral') is an Israeli settlement and kibbutz in the West Bank, near the northwestern shore of the Dead Sea in the Jordan Rift Valley. Established as a Nahal settlement in 1977 and converted into a civilian kibbutz in 1979, it is named after Yehuda Almog, a pioneer of Jewish settlement and industrial development in the Dead Sea region during the Mandatory Palestine period.

The community is located near the site of Beit HaArava, a Jewish kibbutz established in 1939 with which Yehuda Almog was closely associated. The original Beit HaArava was evacuated during the 1948 Arab–Israeli War.

Almog is administered by the Megilot Regional Council and is affiliated with the Kibbutz Movement. In 2024 its population was 347.

The international community considers Israeli settlements in the West Bank illegal under international law, but the Israeli government disputes this.

== History ==
=== Historical background and namesake ===
Almog is named in memory of Yehuda Almog (1896–1972), originally Yehuda Kopolevitz, a prominent figure in the Third Aliyah and the development of Jewish communities and industry around the Dead Sea.

Born near Vilnius in the Russian Empire, Almog became involved in the Zionist pioneer movement HeHalutz and worked alongside Joseph Trumpeldor. He immigrated to Palestine in 1919 and was among the founders of Gdud HaAvoda, a pioneering labour organisation established in the early 1920s. He was also involved in the establishment of kibbutz Ramat Rachel, near Jerusalem.

During the 1930s, Almog became closely associated with the development of the Dead Sea region. From 1934 onwards, he worked to improve the conditions of Jewish workers employed in the potash industry at Sodom and promoted the establishment of permanent agricultural communities in the surrounding desert.

The industry had developed under the British Mandate through the activities of Moshe Novomeysky, Moshe Langotsky, Yehuda Almog and other pioneers. The Palestine Potash Company established operations at the northern end of the Dead Sea in 1930 and subsequently expanded production southwards to Sodom in 1934. The enterprise became one of the largest industrial operations in Mandatory Palestine.

Yehuda Almog also played a role in the establishment of the nearby kibbutz Beit HaArava in 1939. He encouraged members of Zionist youth movements to settle in the northern Dead Sea region and helped secure access to land controlled by the Palestine Potash Company for the establishment of an agricultural settlement.

Beit HaArava became known for its experiments in reclaiming saline soil through irrigation with fresh water from the Jordan River. The kibbutz developed agricultural fields and other facilities in an environment previously regarded as unsuitable for cultivation.

The original Beit HaArava was evacuated in May 1948 during the 1948 Arab–Israeli War and subsequently destroyed. Its residents relocated to other Jewish communities, eventually establishing the kibbutzim of Gesher HaZiv and Kabri in northern Israel.

Although the present-day Almog was established decades later at a different location, its name commemorates Yehuda Almog's contribution to the development of the Dead Sea region before Israeli independence.

=== Establishment of the kibbutz (1977–1979) ===
Following Israel's capture of the West Bank from Jordan during the Six-Day War in 1967, Israeli settlements were established in the northern Dead Sea region, including Kalya and Mitzpe Shalem.

Almog was founded in 1977 as a Nahal settlement, combining military service with agricultural settlement. The outpost was established in the northern Dead Sea area, near the road connecting Jerusalem with Jericho and the Dead Sea.

In January 1979, the outpost was converted into a civilian kibbutz. The founding civilian group consisted principally of young people from existing Israeli kibbutzim affiliated with the United Kibbutz Movement.

The new kibbutz adopted the name Almog in commemoration of Yehuda Kopolevitz Almog, whose activities in the 1930s and subsequent decades had contributed to the establishment of Jewish communities and industries around the Dead Sea.

The kibbutz developed as a secular agricultural community and became affiliated with the Kibbutz Movement. Its economic activities subsequently expanded to include tourism and hospitality.

=== Land and settlement development ===
According to the Applied Research Institute–Jerusalem (ARIJ), Israel confiscated 524 dunams of unproductive land from the Palestinian locality of Nabi Musa in 1977 for the construction of Almog.

The establishment of Almog formed part of the wider development of Israeli settlements in the northern Dead Sea and Jordan Valley areas following 1967.

Over subsequent decades, Almog developed residential facilities, agricultural enterprises and tourism services. It also became a destination for visitors travelling between Jerusalem, Jericho and the Dead Sea.

== Economy ==
=== Agriculture ===
Agriculture has been a principal economic activity at Almog since its establishment as a kibbutz. The community developed farming operations adapted to the hot and arid climate of the northern Dead Sea region.

Its agricultural activities have included date-palm plantations, field crops, banana cultivation, dairy farming and poultry production.

The region's high temperatures and extended growing season provide conditions suitable for certain crops, particularly date palms. The development of agriculture in Almog also reflects the longer history of experimental desert cultivation associated with nearby Beit HaArava.

=== Tourism and hospitality ===
Tourism became another significant part of the kibbutz's economy. Almog developed a holiday village offering guest accommodation, recreational facilities and access to attractions around the Dead Sea and the Judaean Desert.

The kibbutz is situated near Qumran, the archaeological site associated with the discovery of the Dead Sea Scrolls. Tourism descriptions of Almog have also identified a small museum or exhibition displaying reproductions of the scrolls.

In March 2025, it was reported that the neighbouring kibbutz of Kalya had signed a 20-year agreement to lease Almog's holiday resort, comprising 81 guest rooms. The agreement provided for renovation of the accommodation and facilities, with the resort to be managed as part of Kalya's expanding tourism operations.

== See also ==
- Beit HaArava
- Kalya
- Megilot Regional Council
- Dead Sea Works
- Qumran
