= Ovnat =

Israeli settlement in the West Bank

Ovnat: אָבְנַת (Hebrew)

Hebrew transcription(s)
  - Official: Avenat, Avnat
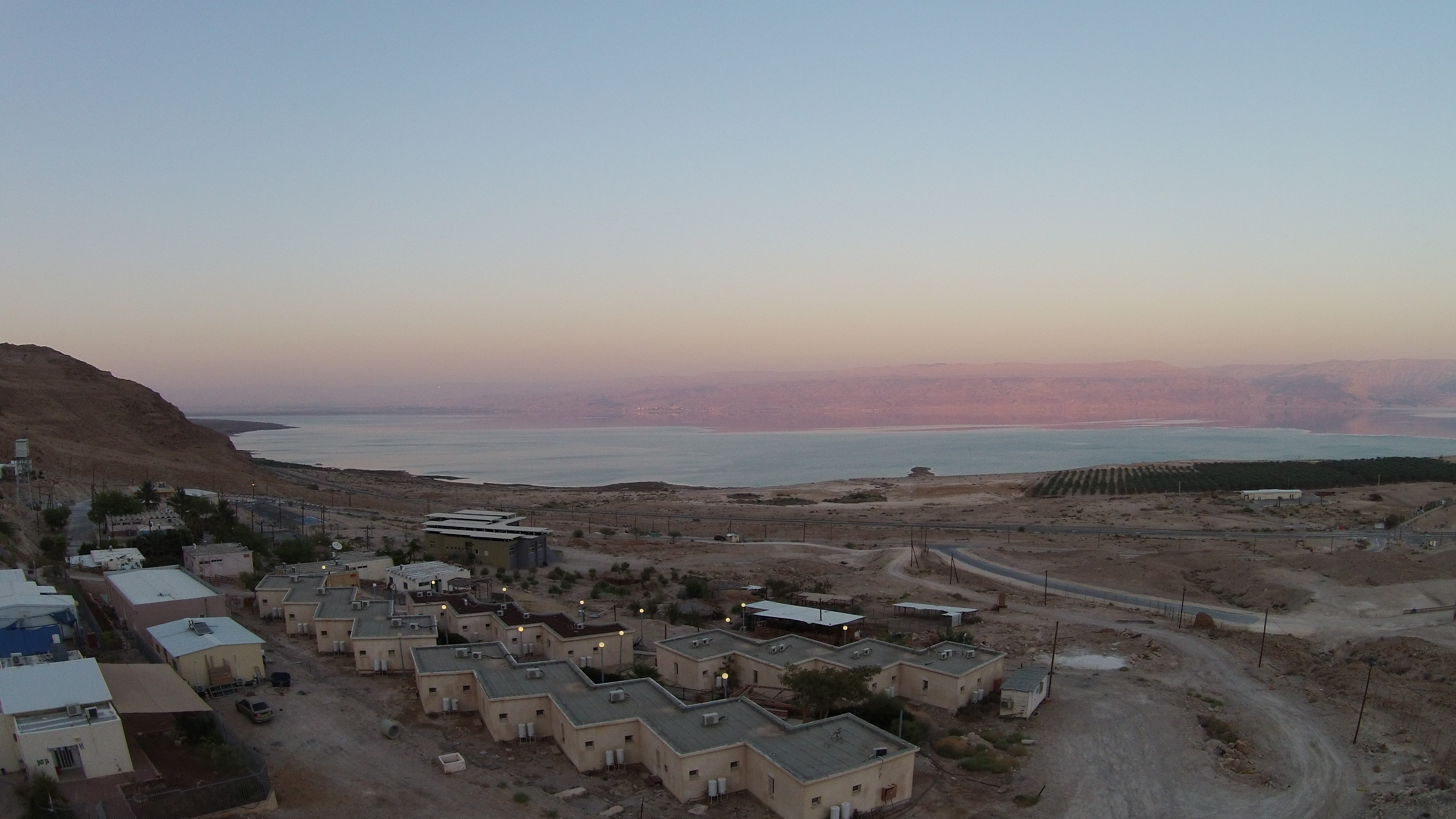

- Location within the Southern West Bank
- Coordinates: 31°40′45″N 35°26′12″E
- Country: Palestine
- District: Judea and Samaria Area
- Council: Megilot
- Region: West Bank
- Founded: 2004
- Population (2024): 292

Ovnat (Hebrew: אׇבְנַת) is a small Israeli settlement in the West Bank, Palestine, on the western shore of the Dead Sea, about 7 km (4 mi) south of Kalya and 12 km (7 mi) north of Mitzpe Shalem. It falls under the jurisdiction of Megilot Regional Council. In 2024 it had a population of 292.

The international community considers Israeli settlements in the West Bank illegal under international law, but the Israeli government disputes this.

== History ==
The settlement was established as a Nahal outpost named Nahal Kidron in January 1987. According to the Palestinian NGO ARIJ, Israel confiscated 124 dunams of land from the Palestinian town of al-Ubeidiya in order to construct Ovnat.

In June 1998, the Megilot Regional Council signed a contract with a private company to operate a college for complementary medicine and computer studies at the site. The contract was signed under an agreement between the Settlement Division and the council, which authorized the council to operate the compound whose leasehold rights belonged to the Settlement Division. In October 1998, the company began operating the college.

Since 2003, a therapeutic boarding school for at-risk youth from religious homes, called "Yiftah", has operated at the site. Some of the settlement's residents work there. In addition, the settlement operates a day care center, a nursery, and a kindergarten. The settlement's children also study at the regional school in Kalya.

In 2004, the settlement was civilianized.

The settlement's name was changed from "Nahal Kidron" to "Avnat" in order to avoid confusion with the moshav Kidron in the Shfela. The name Avnat is symbolic and modeled after Biblical-style names such as Osnat and Basemath.

Nearby, south of the settlement, the Kidron Stream flows into the Dead Sea, and north of it Wadi Mazin also flows into the sea. About half a kilometer east of the settlement is Metsad Kidron.

The settlement covers 85 dunams, and in 2011 it had 24 residential units. At the beginning of 2015, the settlement opened 20 plots for construction, facing east toward the landscapes of the Dead Sea and the Moab Mountains.

In March 2025, the Security Cabinet decided to grant Avnat, along with 12 additional settlements of similar status, independent status. Until then, the settlement had officially been considered part of nearby Mitzpe Shalem, although it functioned independently. In November of that year, the settlement received official status.
