= Beit HaArava =

Israeli settlement and kibbutz in the West Bank

Beit HaArava: בֵּית הָעֲרָבָה (Hebrew)
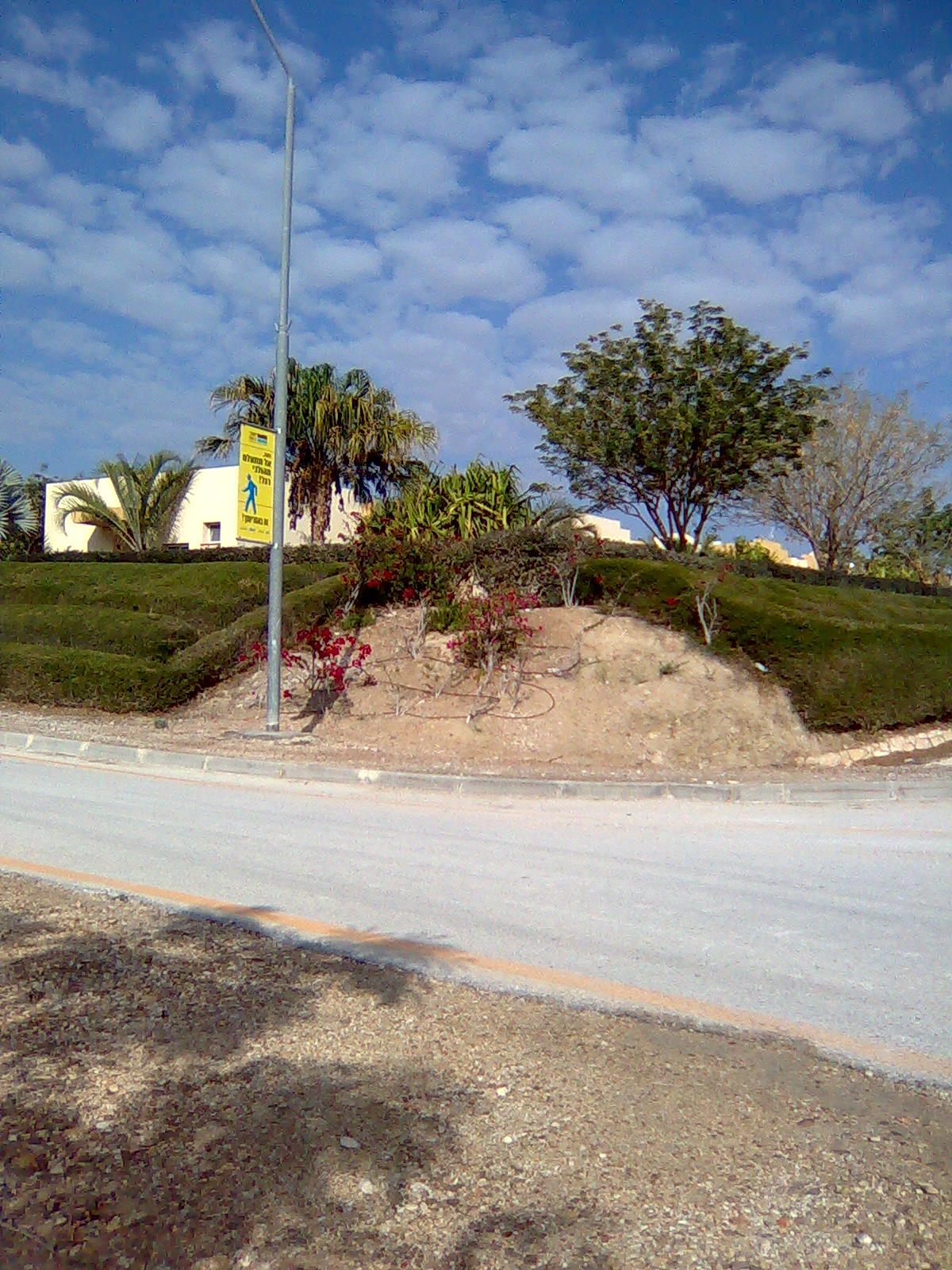
- Etymology: House of the Arava
- Location within the Central West Bank
- Coordinates: 31°48′30″N 35°28′33″E
- Country: Palestine
- District: Judea and Samaria Area
- Council: Megilot
- Region: West Bank
- Founded: 1939 (original kibbutz); 1980 (re-establishment)
- Founder: Youth Aliyah members
- Population (2024): 609

Beit HaArava (Hebrew: בֵּית הָעֲרָבָה, lit. 'House of the Arabah') is an Israeli settlement and kibbutz in the West Bank, near the Dead Sea and Jericho. It takes its name from an earlier Jewish kibbutz established in the area in 1939, during Mandatory Palestine. The original community was evacuated during the 1948 Arab–Israeli War and subsequently destroyed. Its former residents went on to establish two kibbutzim in northern Israel.

A new community bearing the same name was established several kilometres from the original site in 1980 as a Nahal outpost. It became a civilian kibbutz in 1986 and relocated to its present site in 2000.

The present-day community is located near Beit HaArava Junction, at the intersection of Highway 1 and Highway 90, and falls under the jurisdiction of Megilot Regional Council. In 2024 it had a population of 609.

The international community considers Israeli settlements in the West Bank illegal under international law, but the Israeli government disputes this.

== History ==
=== Original kibbutz (1939–1948) ===
Beit HaArava was originally established in 1939 by Jewish pioneers associated with Zionist youth movements, including immigrants from Germany and other parts of Central Europe. Some of the founders had fled Nazi Germany and arrived in Mandatory Palestine through Youth Aliyah.

The kibbutz was established on land belonging to the Palestine Potash Company, near its operations on the northern shore of the Dead Sea. The original settlers included members of the Mahanot HaOlim youth movement. The community initially functioned partly as a residential settlement for workers employed in the nearby potash industry.

David Coren, later a member of the Knesset, was among the founders.

The kibbutz took its name from the biblical settlement of Beth-arabah, mentioned in the Book of Joshua (Joshua 18:22). The Hebrew name refers to the Arabah, the arid region extending towards the Dead Sea.

==== Agricultural development ====
Beit HaArava became known for its agricultural experiments and the successful cultivation of highly saline soil. The land surrounding the northern Dead Sea had previously been considered unsuitable for conventional agriculture because of its exceptionally high salt content.

The settlers developed a method of reclaiming the soil by flooding it with fresh water brought from the Jordan River, allowing accumulated salts to be washed below the level of plant roots. This process enabled the cultivation of vegetables, fruit trees and animal fodder.

The community also established fish ponds, orchards and other agricultural facilities. Its produce became known for ripening early because of the region's warm climate.

The achievements of the kibbutz were documented in the film House in the Desert, which won a documentary award at the Venice Film Festival in 1947. The film and the community's agricultural development were subsequently described by writer Irwin Shaw in a 1949 article for The New Yorker.

According to the Jewish National Fund, Beit HaArava became particularly associated with the reclamation of land that had not previously supported cultivation.

==== Evacuation and destruction in 1948 ====
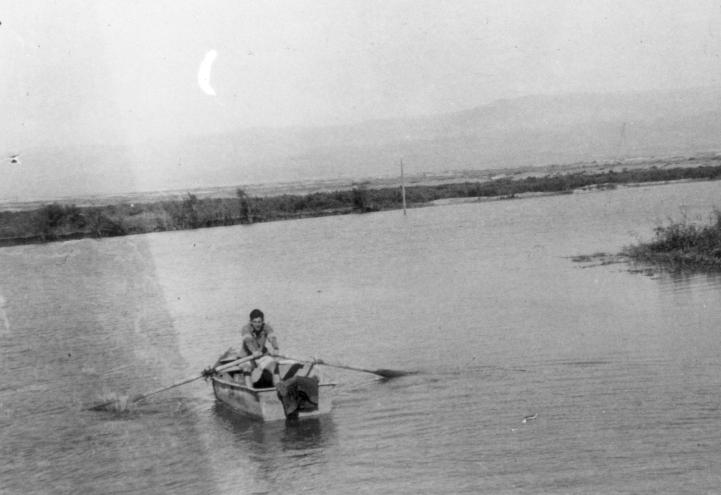
Working the fish ponds at Beit HaArava in the 1940s.

By 1947, Beit HaArava had a population of more than 200 residents.

During the 1948 Arab–Israeli War, the kibbutz and the nearby Jewish community of Kalya became increasingly isolated as fighting spread through the Jordan Valley and the northern Dead Sea region.

Following the outbreak of the war, access to Beit HaArava was severely restricted. The fall of Gush Etzion to the Arab Legion and the entry of Transjordanian forces into the conflict further threatened the isolated settlements.

Efforts were made to reach an arrangement concerning the security of the communities, including contacts with Transjordan's King Abdullah. Ultimately, the decision was taken to evacuate the northern Dead Sea settlements.

On 15 May 1948, the evacuation of non-combatants from Beit HaArava was ordered. On 20 May, following the assessment that the northern Dead Sea area could no longer be defended, the remaining residents were evacuated. They travelled by boat across the Dead Sea to the Jewish-controlled area at Sodom.

The abandoned kibbutz was subsequently destroyed. According to Encyclopaedia Judaica, the Arab Legion razed the settlement after its evacuation. A contemporary account by Irwin Shaw reported that the departing settlers had demolished some structures before Arab forces arrived and completed the destruction.

The original settlement was not rebuilt following the war. By the time Israeli forces reached the area in 1967, little remained of the former kibbutz, and the reclaimed agricultural land had largely returned to its previous saline condition.

The evacuated residents were initially accommodated at kibbutz Shefayim. They subsequently divided into two groups, which established Gesher HaZiv and Kabri in the Western Galilee in 1949.

The history of the original kibbutz was later documented by kibbutz-movement historian Zvi Dror in his 1994 book Shutfut Bema'aseh Habria (literally, "Participating in the Act of Creation").

=== Establishment of new settlement in 1980 ===
Following Israel's capture of the West Bank from Jordan in the Six-Day War of 1967, Israeli settlements were established in the northern Dead Sea region, including Kalya and Almog.

In 1980, a new Nahal outpost named Beit HaArava was established several kilometres from the site of the original kibbutz. The new community adopted the name and historical heritage of its predecessor, although it did not occupy precisely the same location.

The outpost became a civilian community in 1986 and was affiliated with the kibbutz movement. In 2000, Beit HaArava relocated approximately two kilometres westwards to its present permanent site.

According to the Applied Research Institute–Jerusalem (ARIJ), Israel expropriated 506 dunams of land from the Palestinian locality of Nabi Musa in 1980 for construction associated with Beit HaArava.

The present-day kibbutz maintains a connection with the history of the original community established in 1939. Its historical heritage forms part of the community's identity, despite the interruption between the evacuation of the original kibbutz in 1948 and the establishment of the new settlement in 1980.

== Economy ==
Agriculture has historically been a significant economic activity at Beit HaArava. The original kibbutz specialised in reclaiming saline land for cultivation, while the later community has been associated with the cultivation of dates, vineyards and other crops.

The Beit HaArava area was also the site of a major experimental solar pond power station during the 1980s. The facility used saline water to collect and store solar heat, which was then converted into electricity.

The installation comprised two solar ponds with surface areas of approximately 210,000 m² and 40,000 m² respectively, covering a combined area of 250,000 m². The associated power station had a generating capacity of 5 MW and was connected to the electricity grid in 1984.

The project was among the largest solar pond electricity-generation experiments undertaken at the time. Its construction, operation and performance were documented by H. Z. Tabor and B. Doron in a 1990 paper published in the journal Solar Energy.
