= Beit Hogla =

Israeli settlement near Jericho

Beit Hogla: בית חגלה (Hebrew)
- Location within the Central West Bank
- Coordinates: 31°49′16″N 35°30′26″E
- Country: Israel
- District: Judea and Samaria Area
- Council: Megilot
- Region: West Bank
- Founded: 1983

Beit Hogla is a Israeli settlement near Jericho.

== History ==
The settlement was first established in July 1983 as a Nahal settlement, named first "Mul Nevo" (lit. opposite Mount Nevo). The Settlement was never transformed in to a civilian settlement, and in 1993 was made in to a military outpost.

According to the Sasson Report, the place was established in 1993 as a small farm.

In July 2015 Arabs broke into the farm and attacked the locals. This led in 2016 to the establishment of a community named "Roeh Nevo".

In February 2023, The Security Cabinet of Israel granted official recognitions to the settlement. In July 2024 the Israeli Civil Administration approved a building plan for the settlement, witch included also the nearby "Kedem Arava".
