= Nabi Musa =

Holy site in Jericho, West Bank, Palestine

- Village

Arabic transcription(s)
  - Arabic: ٱلنَّبِي مُوْسَى
  - Latin: An-Nabi Musa (official); Nebi Musa (unofficial)
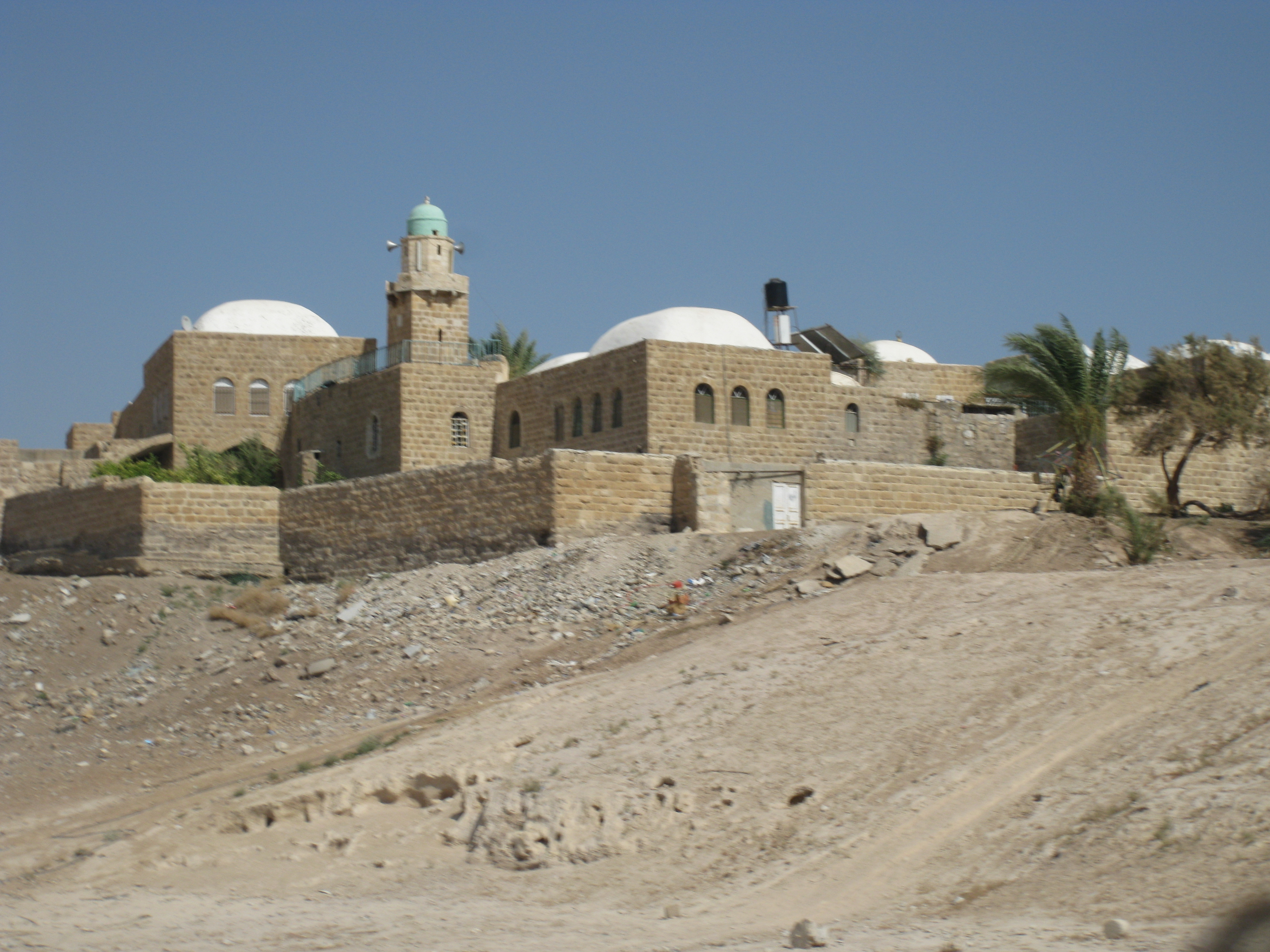
- Nabi Musa, 2010

- Location of Nabi Musa in the State of Palestine Nabi Musa (the West Bank)
- Coordinates: 31°47′11″N 35°25′52″E
- State: State of Palestine
- Governorate: Jericho

Government
  - Type: Local Development Committee

Area
  - Total: 122.2 km^{2} (47.2 sq mi)

Population (2017)
  - Total: 343
  - Density: 2.81/km^{2} (7.27/sq mi)
- Name meaning: "Prophet Moses"

Nabi Musa (Arabic: ٱلنَّبِي مُوْسَى, romanized: Al-Nabī Mūsā, lit. 'the Prophet Moses', also transliterated as Nebi Musa) is primarily a Muslim holy site near Jericho in Palestine, where a local Muslim tradition places the tomb of Moses (called Musa in Islam). The compound is centered on a mosque which contains the tomb of the Prophet. It used to be the site of an eponymous seven-day-long religious festival that was celebrated annually by Palestinian Muslims, beginning on the Friday before Good Friday in the Orthodox calendar used by the Greek Orthodox Church of Jerusalem. Considered in the political context of 1920 as "the most important Muslim pilgrimage in Palestine", the festival was built around a collective pilgrimage from Jerusalem to what was understood to be the Tomb of Moses. A great building with multiple domes marks the mausoleum of Moses.

Nabi Musa is also a Palestinian administrative territorial unit in the Jericho Governorate on the West Bank, with an area of c. 113 km^{2} and situated south of Jericho, in which 66 Palestinian households were counted in 2007, a population defined in 2012 as "nomads" (see West Bank Bedouin). By 2017, Nabi Musa district had a population of 343 residents.

== Location ==
The shrine of Nabi Musa lies 11 km (6.8 mi) south of Jericho and 20 km (12 mi) east of Jerusalem, in the Judaean Desert. A side road to the right of the main Jerusalem-Jericho road, about 2 km (1.2 mi) beyond the sign indicating sea level, leads to the site.

== "Tomb of Moses" tradition ==
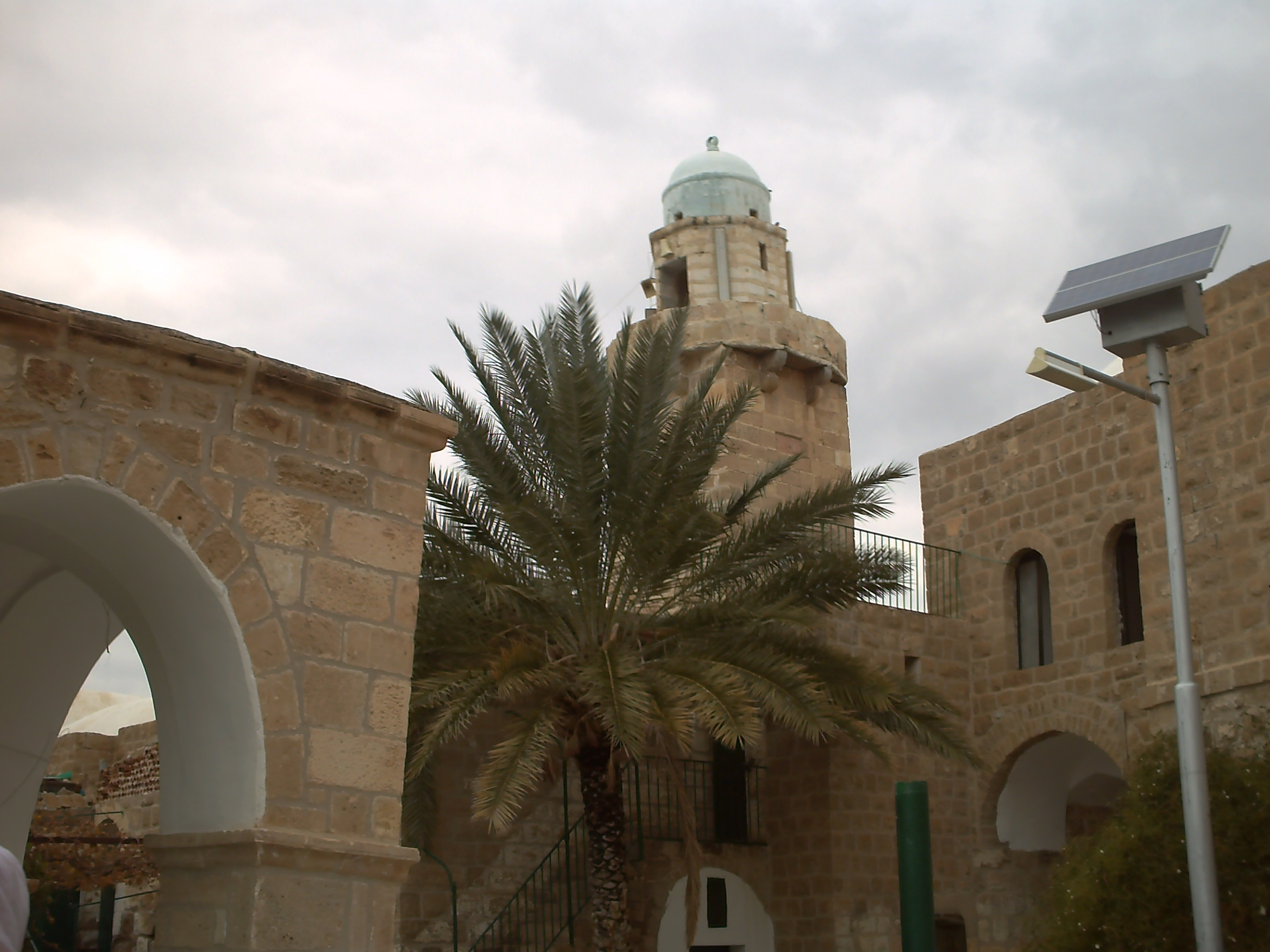
The maqam of Nabi Musa

=== Death and burial of Moses in Islam ===
In a hadith narrated by Abu Hurairah (Bukhari: 3407):

"The Angel of Death was sent to Moses when he came to Moses, Moses slapped him on the eye. The angel returned to his Lord and said,

"You have sent me to a servant who does not want to die."

Allah said, "Return to him and tell him to put his hand on the back of an ox and for every hair that will come under it, he will be granted one year of life."

Moses said, "O Lord! What will happen after that?"

Allah replied, "Then death."

Moses said, "Let it come now."

Moses then requested Allah to let him die close to the Sacred Land so much so that he would be at a distance of a stone's throw from it."

Abu Huraira added, "Allah's Messenger (ﷺ) said, 'If I were there, I would show you his grave below the red sand hill on the side of the road."

=== Tradition and scholarly theories ===
In Islam, Moses' burial place is also considered to be unknown. However, local Muslim tradition places the "Tomb of Moses" at the maqam (Muslim shrine) of Nabi Musa ("Prophet Moses"). It is not known when this tradition has first emerged. The Jerusalem-Jericho road was one of the primary routes used by Mediterranean Arabs to make a pilgrimage to Mecca. The site where the shrine stands since the 13th century is located at what would have marked the end of the first day's march in that direction. Originally, it was simply a point from which pilgrims could rest, look across the Jordan Valley, catch a glimpse of Mount Nebo where (as suggested by the Hebrew Bible) the tomb of Moses used to be, and venerate it from this spot.

It seems that by the time when Mamluk sultan Baibars visited the site in 1269 while returning from his hajj, "there must have been some association", since he set about building an extensive shrine. Murphy-O'Connor considers that gradually, the lookout point for Moses' distant gravesite beyond the Jordan was confused with Moses' tomb itself, laying the ground for the cultic importance Nabi Musa was to acquire in the Sunni reverence of saints (walis). According to Uri M. Kupferschmidt, it appears to have become a fixed point in the local Muslim calendar from the time of Saladin. In any case, tradition holds that the spot where the shrine now stands was shown to Saladin in a dream, which prompted him to build a mosque at the site, later expanded by Baibars.

The Arab geographer Mujir al-Din from Jerusalem, writing in the 1490s, admits that the tradition has only a weak chance of authenticity, but that Nabi Musa still is the most popular among several sites with similar claims.

The Taiyabi and Dawoodi Bohra Isma'ili sects also believe in this tradition.

== Festival date ==
Although being a religious Muslim festival, its date is set in relation to the Greek Orthodox calendar: the main event, which took one week, always started on the Friday preceding Good Friday. Starting in the mid-19th century, the participants gathered in Jerusalem already in the week before that, and prayers were held in the city. Then followed the week-long celebrations at the shrine, and after that, the pilgrims returned to Jerusalem on the day the Orthodox Christians celebrated Holy Thursday. The next day, on Friday, which coincided with Orthodox Good Friday, the Muslim crowds went in procession to Al-Aqsa Mosque and the Dome of the Rock. On that Friday and the following Saturday (Orthodox Easter Eve), the participants left Jerusalem with flags and music.

== History ==
=== Ayyubid beginnings ===
Popular Palestinian tradition holds that the festival was inaugurated in the time after Saladin's recapture of Jerusalem from the Crusaders in 1187. The mainstream opinion among historians is that the shrine was built by Baibars some eight decades later, and that the Saladin myth is a 19th-century reaction to Western encroachment; this, however, doesn't preclude some scholars from finding merit in the Saladin narrative. In modern times, the holiday has been popularly associated with Saladin as a symbol for the victorious struggle against the West, embodied by the Crusaders. It is claimed that Saladin, after defeating the Europeans, wanted to ensure that future Crusades wouldn't take advantage of the large annual Easter pilgrimage to Jerusalem in order to again wrestle the Holy City from the Muslims. To this end, the participants in the Nabi Musa mawsim, or celebrations, would ensure the city's protection. This is however not documented.

=== Mamluk period ===
In 1269, the Mamluk sultan Baybars built a small shrine there as part of a general policy he adopted after conquering towns and rural areas from Lebanon to Hebron from the Kingdom of Jerusalem. The shrines were mainly dedicated to prophets and companions of the Prophet, and their maintenance was funded by a waqf, an endowment from properties that formerly belonged to the Latin Church. In the case of Nabi Musa, the waqf fund was secured from ecclesiastical assets expropriated in nearby Jericho.

Baibars' construction inscription is still to be seen. It indicates the year the shrine was built, AH 668 (1269-70 CE), and the fact that he "ordered the building of this noble sacred place over the tomb of Moses" while he was returning from Hajj towards Jerusalem. Although the sultan's secretary doesn't mention the construction, one of his biographers, Ibn Shaddad al-Halabi, does so, albeit with little detail. The inscription is full of praise for Baibars' military prowess and, other than other similar plaques of its age, is written in easily legible script and placed low enough as to be read by the visitor, letting everyone know about Baibars' might and piety.

Baibars al-Bunduqdari's constructive piety set a precedent for others. Over the late medieval period, hostels for travellers were built adjacent to the shrine, and the hospice in its present form was completed in the decade between 1470 and 1480.

=== Ottoman period ===
During Ottoman rule, Nabi Musa would be visited by Muslim pilgrims returning from the Hajj in Mecca on their way to Syria. Pilgrims visiting the shrine would have departed from the main body of the caravan east of the Jordan to visit Jerusalem and stopped in Nabi Musa en route to the city. The Nabi Musa site effectively served as a halting station for such pilgrims. Its permanent staff provided pilgrims with food and supplies, as well as religious services and information about the safety conditions of the route to Jerusalem, which was often subject to raids or robberies by the Bedouin present in the area. In the mid-16th century, Muhammad Celebi al-Naqqash, the Ottoman official charged with restoring the walls of Jerusalem, was assigned with rehabilitating the Nabi Musa complex.

Around 1820, the Ottoman authorities had to almost fully rebuild the shrine complex, which had, over the previous centuries, fallen into a grave state of dilapidated disrepair. In addition, they promoted a festive pilgrimage to the shrine that would always coincide with the Orthodox Christian celebration of Easter, creating a counter-balance to the Christian ceremonial activity in the city. This 'invention of tradition', as such imaginative constructs are called, made the pageantry of the Nabi Musa pilgrimage a potent symbol of both political and religious identity among Muslims from the outset of the modern period.

Over the 19th century, thousands of Muslims would assemble in Jerusalem, trek to Nabi Musa, and pass three days in feasting, prayer, games and visits to the nearby tomb of Moses' shepherd, Hasan er-Rai. They were then entertained, as guests of the waqf, before returning on the seventh day triumphantly back to Jerusalem.

James Finn, the British Consul in Jerusalem (1846–1863), described the "Neby Moosa pilgrimage" as follows:

The Neby Moosa pilgrimages—to the reputed tomb of the prophet Moses, near the Dead Sea (on the West)—have been instituted so as to coincide with the Christian pilgrimages to the Holy Sepulchre, and the influx of devout Moslems was doubtless intended to counterbalance the effect of so many thousands of sturdy Christians being present in Jerusalem. The Moslems come from every part of the Mohammedan world—from India, Tartary, even to the confines of China, from all the countries of Central Asia, and also from Egypt, Nubia, Morocco, the Eastern shores of Africa, as well as from Arabia proper and the Turkish provinces in Europe and Asia.
These pilgrims—for the most part extremely fanatical, and in a high state of religious excitement—are a formidable and dangerous body of men. During the continuance of the Russian war these Moslem pilgrims were wrought up to an extra pitch of fervour and ostentatious demonstration. There was always danger lest, in the crowded streets and bazaars, through which they forced their processions, they might come into collision with some equally fervid pilgrims on the Christian side. In this case a passing fray might, in the twinkling of an eye, be turned into downright fight, and fight could scarcely end otherwise than in massacre. We always breathed more freely when the Moslem pilgrimages were over, and when their noisy drumming and shouting were at an end, and the usual quiet of Jerusalem was restored.

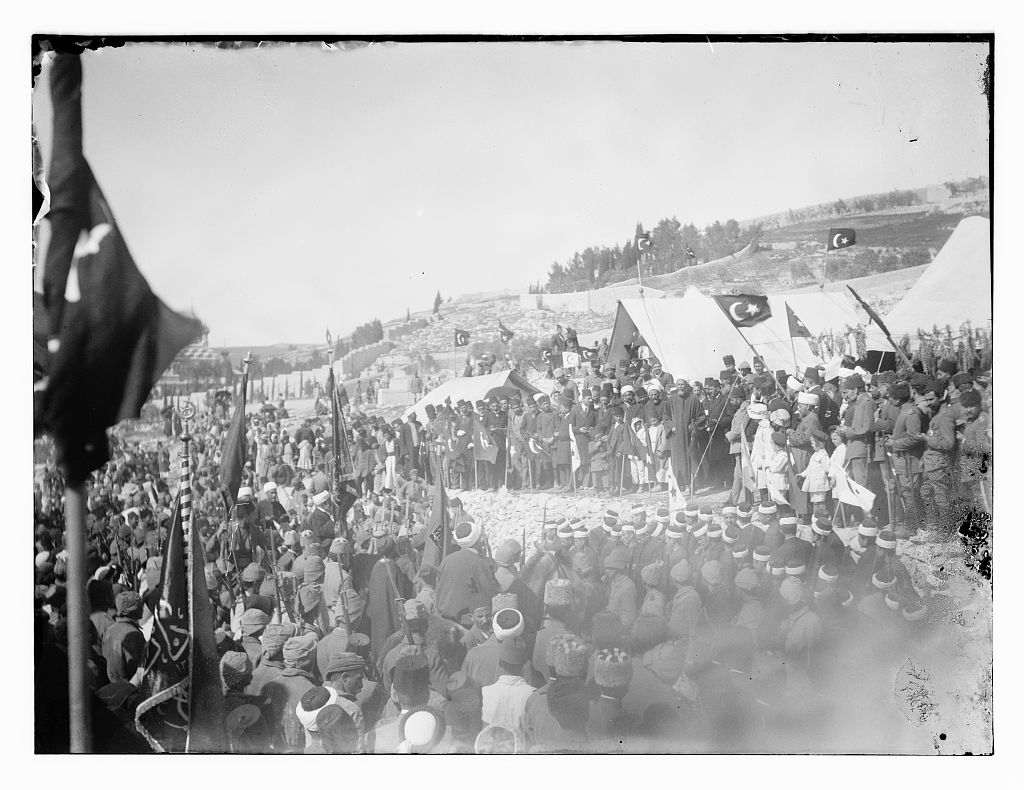
Ottoman flags fly over the Nabi Musa procession for the last time, in 1917

As part of the mid-19th-century Ottoman modernisation and reform period, the newly created local council for Jerusalem was put in charge of organising the Nabi Musa festivities. Its members, all of which belonged to the rich and influential families of the city, changed the main emphasis from the desert shrine to Jerusalem. The festival had taken its traditional shape since the start of the Ottoman era in the 16th century, but now it was restructured, with the main events focusing on the Haram ash-Sharif, with the district mufti of Jerusalem already playing a distinct role which would only increase later on.

In the late 19th century, the Ottomans appointed the al-Husayni family as official custodians of the shrine and hosts of the festival, though their connection with the cult may date back to the previous century. According to Yehoshua Ben-Aryeh, the governor of Jerusalem Rauf Pasha (1876–1888), was the first to attempt to exploit the festival to incite Muslims against Christians. Ilan Pappé offers a different view:

'It is more likely, however, that the governor and his government were rather apprehensive of such an anti-Christian uprising as it could stir instability and disorder at a time when the central government was trying to pacify the Empire. This had been indeed the impression of the engineer (seconded to the Palestine Exploration Fund) Claude Conder. The Hebrew paper, Ha-havazelet, at the time blessed the Ottoman government for imposing law and order in the Nabi Musa affair. The travelogues of Francis Newton testify as well to a peaceful execution of the ceremonies. Indeed, the Turkish government must have acted here against popular feelings, shared by the Husaynis as the masters of the ceremony that Nabi Musa was celebrated in the most unfavourable conditions for the Muslims. It was the iron fist imposed by the Turks that prevented the situation from deteriorating into an all out riot.'

The procession moved off from Jerusalem under a distinctive Nabi Musa banner which the Husaynis conserved for the annual occasion in their al-Dar al-Kabira (the Great House). On arriving at the shrine, the al-Husaynis and another rising Jerusalem family of notables (A'ayan), the Yunis clan, were required to provide two meals a day over the week for all worshippers. Once their vows were taken, or vows previously taken were renewed, they were offered to the festival. The priestly family conducting events would provide about twelve lambs, together with rice, bread, and Arab butter, for a communal meal every day. It was customary to bring young boys aged five, six or older to the two major Palestinian annual pilgrimage sites of Nebi Musa and Nebi Rubin, where they would be circumcised. Sheep were sacrificed in front of the maqam door, and the blood of the victim was smeared on the threshold.

Writing in the early 20th century, Samuel Curtiss recorded that an estimated 15,000 people from all over the country attended the Nabi Musa festival every year.

=== British period ===
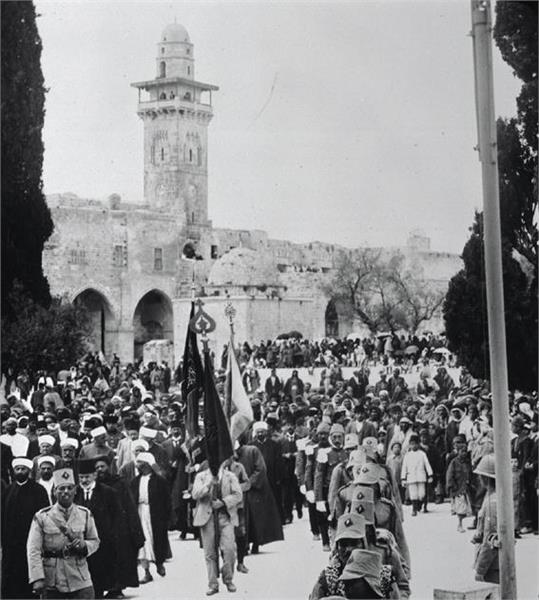
Nabi Musa pilgrimage (on the Temple Mount), before setting out from Jerusalem 1936 CE

For some years from 1919 onwards, pilgrims made their trek back from Jericho to Jerusalem to the sound of English military music.

The anti-Jewish and anti-British 1920 Nebi Musa riots took their starting point during that year's Nebi Musa pilgrimage, with Arabs attacking Jews in the Old City of Jerusalem and causing several deaths. The young Hajj Amin al-Husseini, who had held an anti-Zionist speech to the masses before the riots broke out, was pointed out by the British authorities as the principal instigator, which only helped him gain in popularity among the Arabs. After analysing the situation, the British took steps to appoint him Grand Mufti of Jerusalem, in the hope that he would help them maintain order in the future.

In 1921, while in the process of becoming Grand Mufti, Amin al-Husseini started redesigning the festival according to his view of the national interest of the Palestinian Arabs. A representative of the Jerusalem elites, he pursued a balancing act, avoiding direct confrontation with the British authorities, while transforming the festival from a religious one focused on the area between Nablus north of Jerusalem, and Hebron to its south, to a nationalist event of the entire British-ruled Palestine. By detaching Palestine from the Ottoman Empire and uniting several former distinct provinces under this new name, for which they organised both a civilian representation for its Arab inhabitants, and a religious one for the Muslim majority, the British had created the base and institutions for the development of a burgeoning national identity. Even Palestinian Christians came to Jerusalem during the festival to support the nationalist cause. Hajj Amin al-Husseini, as custodian of the Nabi Musa pilgrimage and as the head of the Supreme Muslim Council, became the architect of a new concept for the Nabi Musa festival, which he very energetically used as a tool for his national and political plans.

The 1922 census of Palestine does not mention Nabi Musa, but the 1931 census lists Nabi Musa as home to three Muslims, all living in one house. The 1938 village statistics lists Nabi Musa as having 967 residents (692 non-Jews and 275 Jews). The 1945 village statistics lists Nabi Musa, along with the northern Palestine Potash Commission, as having 2,650 residents (1,330 Muslims, 1,270 Jews, 30 Christians, and 20 others).

In 1937, during the Arab revolt in Palestine, Hajj Amin al-Husseini had to flee the country. With the Mufti abroad and the revolt suppressed by the British Army, the festival shrunk in scale and lost the political dimension it had gained in the previous decades. The 1937 decline has not been reverted until the present day.

=== Jordanian period ===
During the 1948 Arab-Israeli war, Jordan took over and eventually annexed the West Bank in 1950. The Jordanian authorities were aware of the potential of the Nabi Musa festival of stirring Palestinian nationalist feelings and riots, and immediately after the 1951 assassination of King Abdullah I by a Palestinian Arab connected to the powerful al-Husayni family, which were also the custodians of Nabi Musa, they suspended the mass gathering in Jerusalem and the procession, allowing only for the celebrations at the desert sanctuary to be held.

=== 1967 and aftermath ===
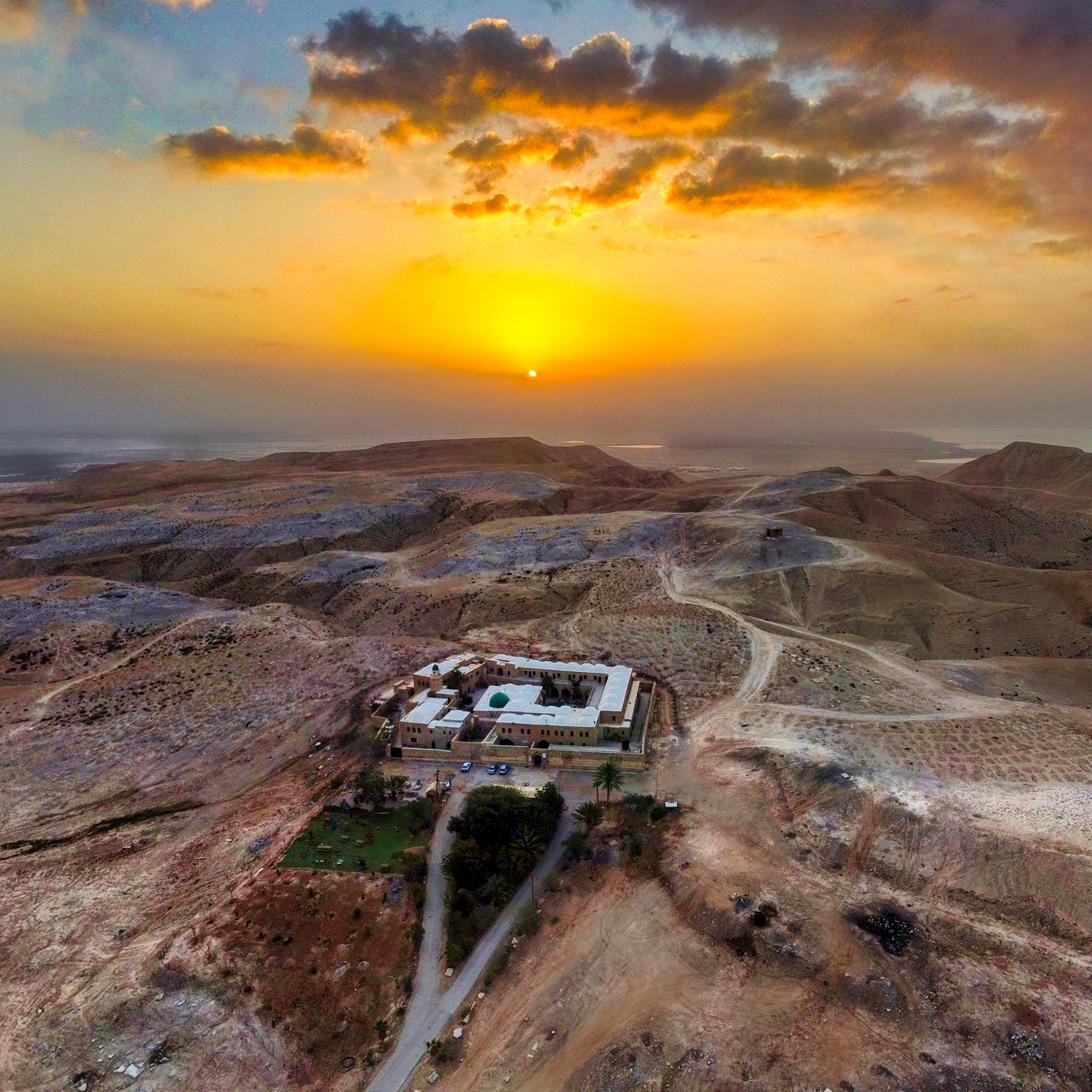
Spring 2022 aerial view of Nabi Musa

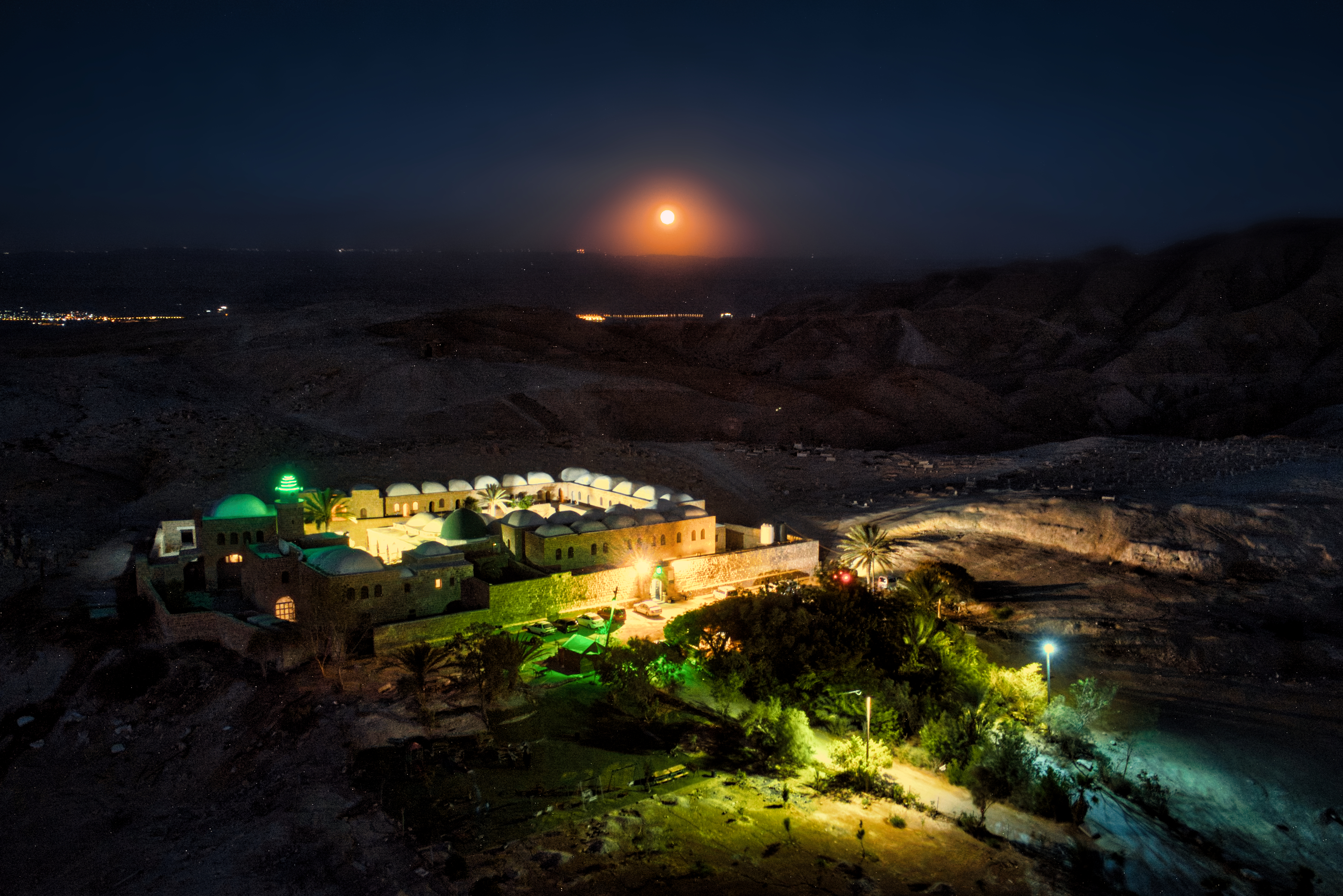
Moonrise of a Supermoon in June 2022

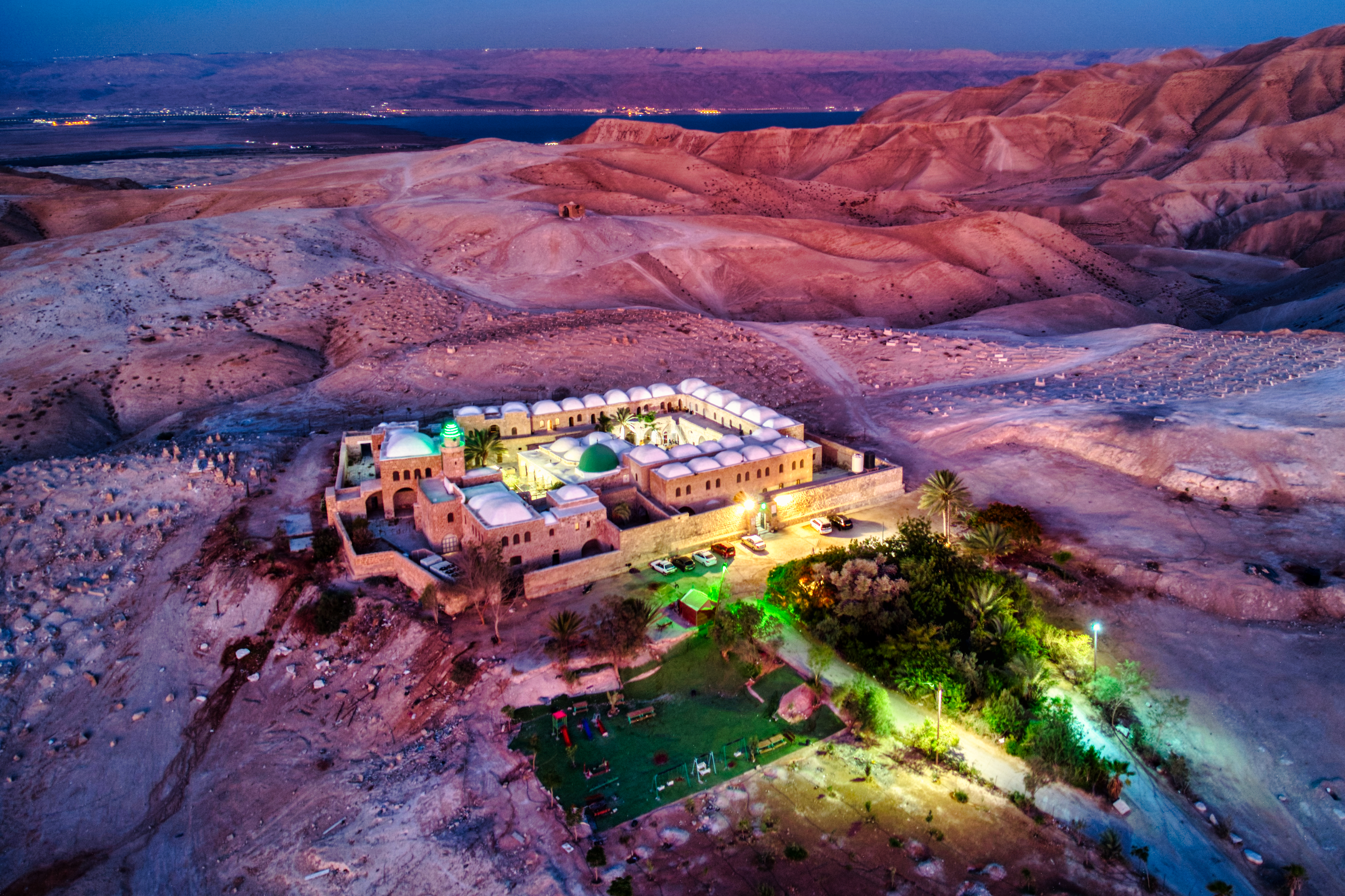
Sunset in June 2022

After the 1967 Six-Day War, Israel occupied the West Bank. In 1987 the pilgrimage from Jerusalem to Nabi Musa was authorised again, but after the outbreak of the First Intifada in December, the festival was again prohibited.

Since 1995, control over the tomb itself has been allocated to the Palestinian National Authority.

After the Oslo Accords (1993, 1995), the Palestinian Authority took charge of organising the pilgrimage, but without any events taking place in Jerusalem. The festivities combine a nationalist and political, as well as a religious and traditional character.

Between 1997 and 2000 the festival did take place, but after the September 2000 outbreak of the Second Intifada, Israeli authorities banned it again until it being renewed in 2007.

==== Israeli settlement activity ====
After 1967, Israel constructed several Israeli settlements in the West Bank near Nabi Musa, in addition to tourist sites, using Nabi Musa-owned land:

- 1977: 524 dunams for Almog
- 1978: 968 dunams for Mitzpe Yeriho
- 1980: 618 dunams for Vered Yeriho
- 1980: 506 dunams for Beit HaArava
- 472 dunams for the northern Dead Sea tourist beaches ("Attractzia")
- 692 dunams for Dead Sea-North ponds (now Og Reservoir for sewage treatment)
- 1,147 dunams for tourist site "Lido Yehuda"

After the 1995 accords, 1.7% of Nabi Musa's land was classified as the Palestinian enclaves of Area A' the remaining 98.3% are designated the fully Israeli-controlled territory of Area C.

== Description ==
=== Shrine ===
It is an enclosed structure composed of several other structures, topped with domes.

=== Shrine of Hasan ar-Ra'ai ===
The large tomb two kilometres south of the maqam is traditionally identified as that of Moses' shepherd, Hasan al-Ra'ai.

=== Sitna Aiesha ===
Sitna Aiesha (meaning our lady Aiesha) is another small maqam near the Nabi Musa complex.

=== Moses rocks ===
Negev Bedouin tribes produced oil from the bituminous shale rocks found in the area around the shrine to Moses which they called "Moses rocks" (Arabic: إِحْجَار مُوْسَى, romanized: Iḥjār Mūsā). The Bedouin not only shared in the belief surrounding the sanctity of the site, but further believed that God had blessed this place where Moses was buried with 'fire rocks' and water wells. Tawfiq Canaan, in his work Mohammedan Saints and Sanctuaries (1927), noted that the black rocks around the shrine would burn when placed in fire and were also used as amulets after being cut into square and triangular forms and inscribed with protective texts.

== Gallery ==
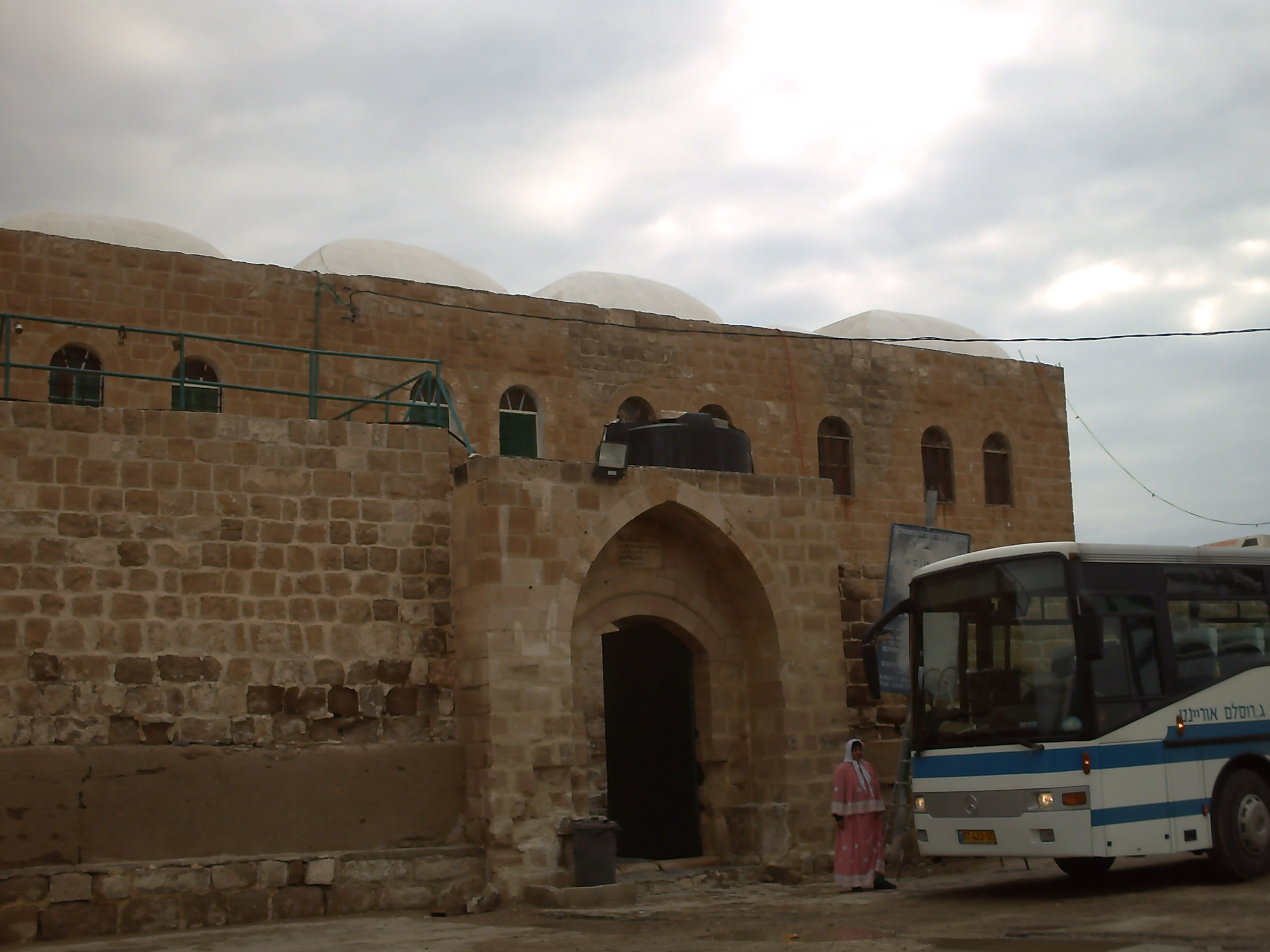
Main gate

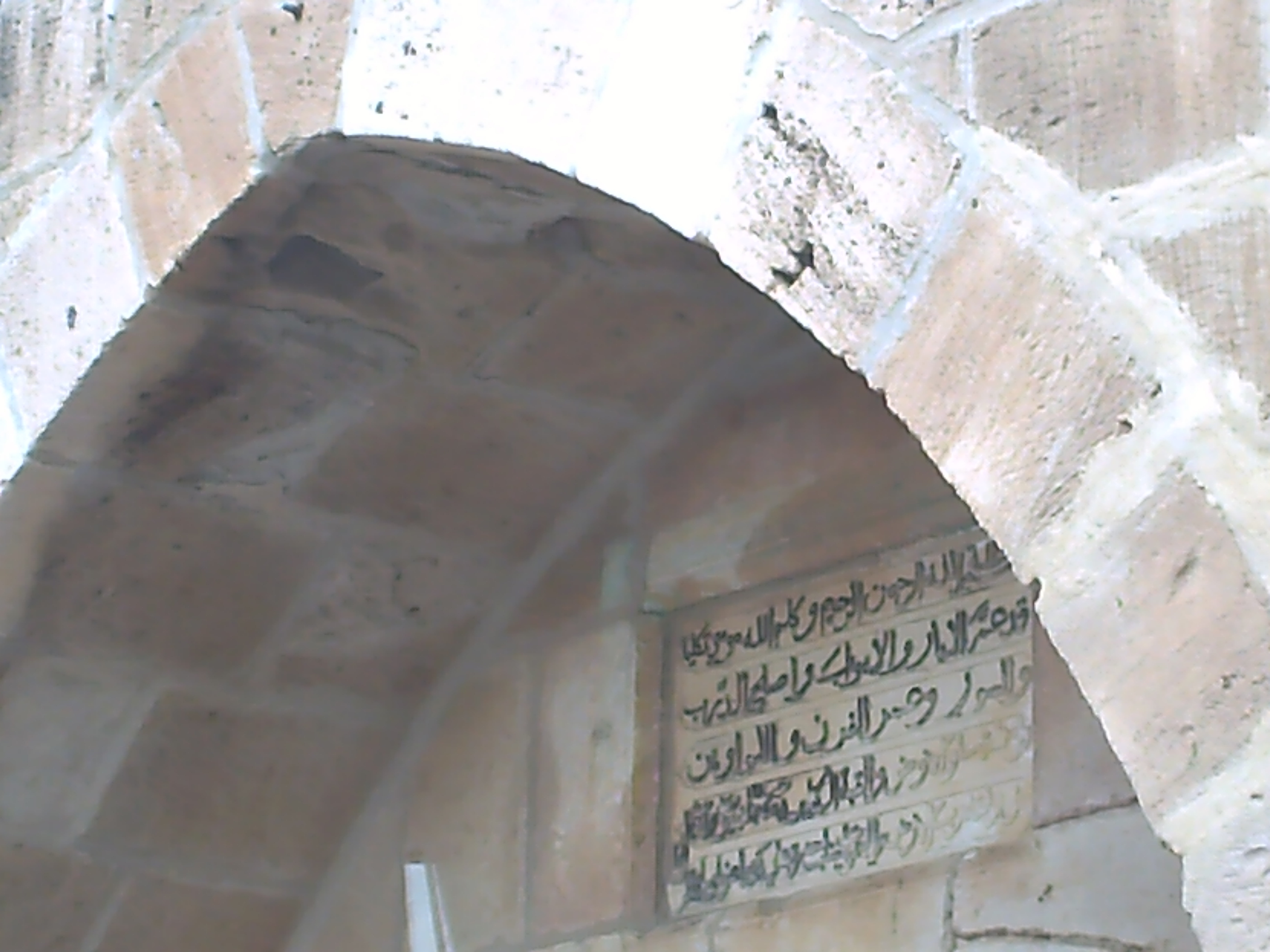
Inscription plaque at the main gate

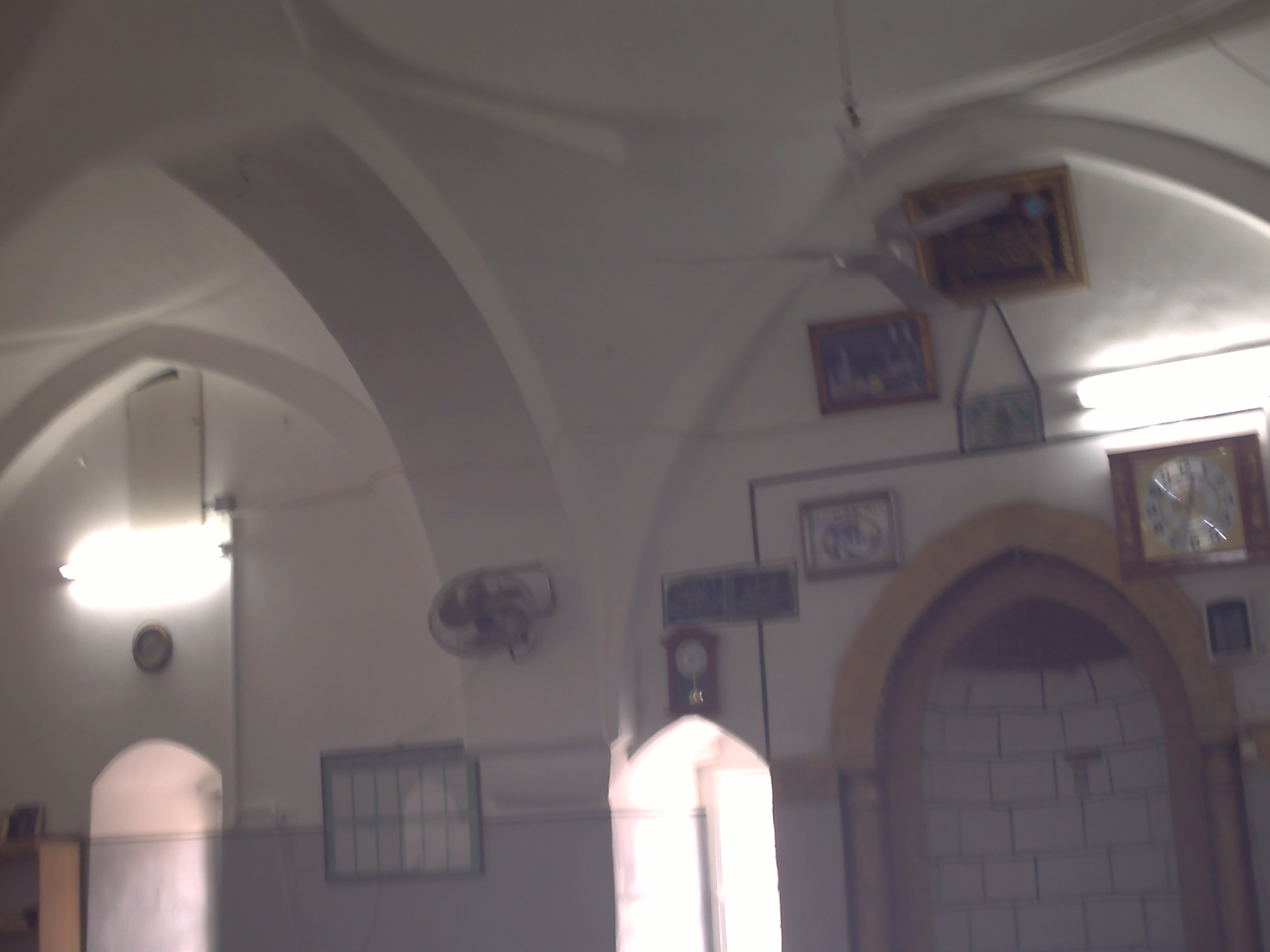
Interior

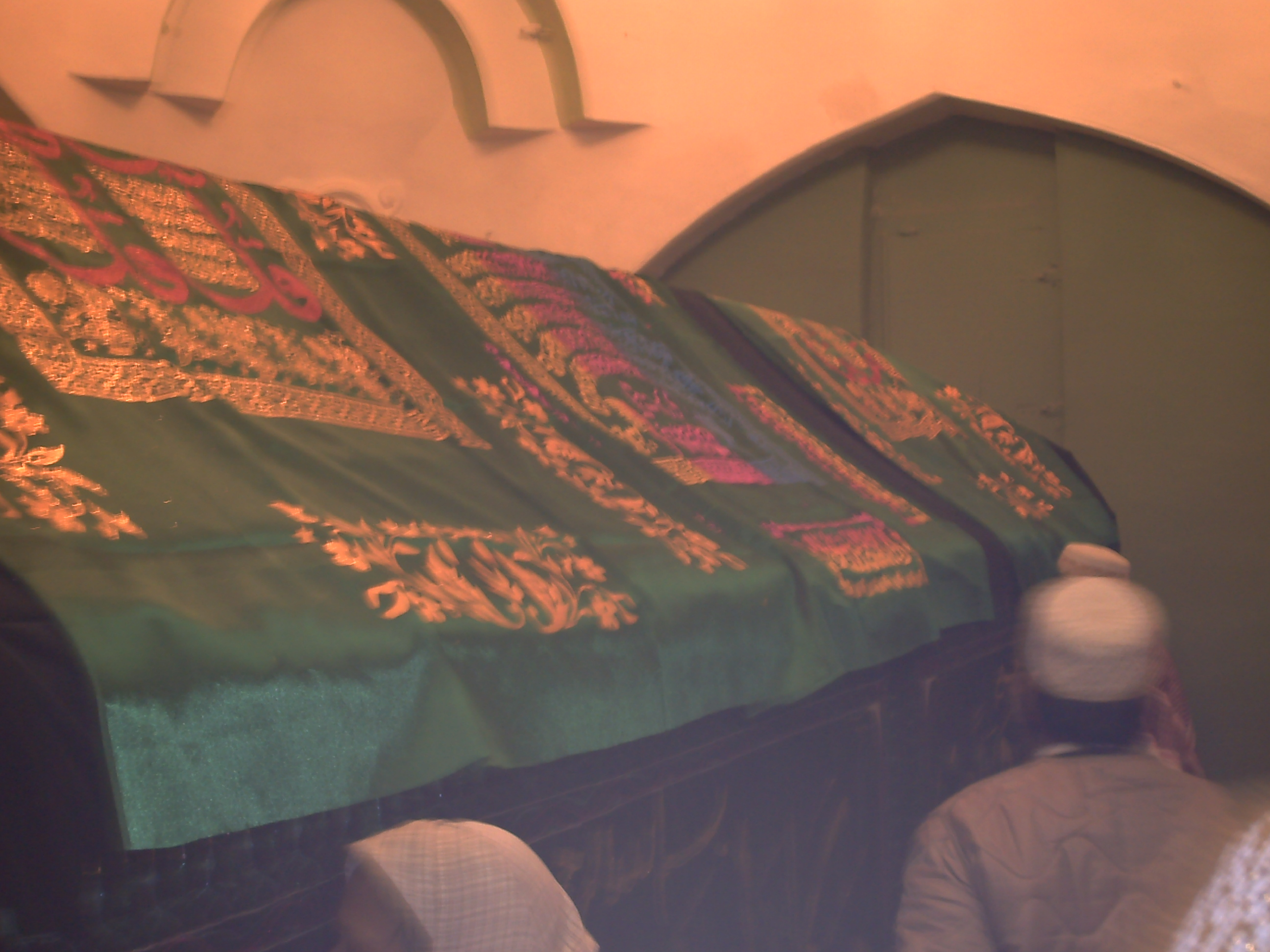
The cenotaph of Moses

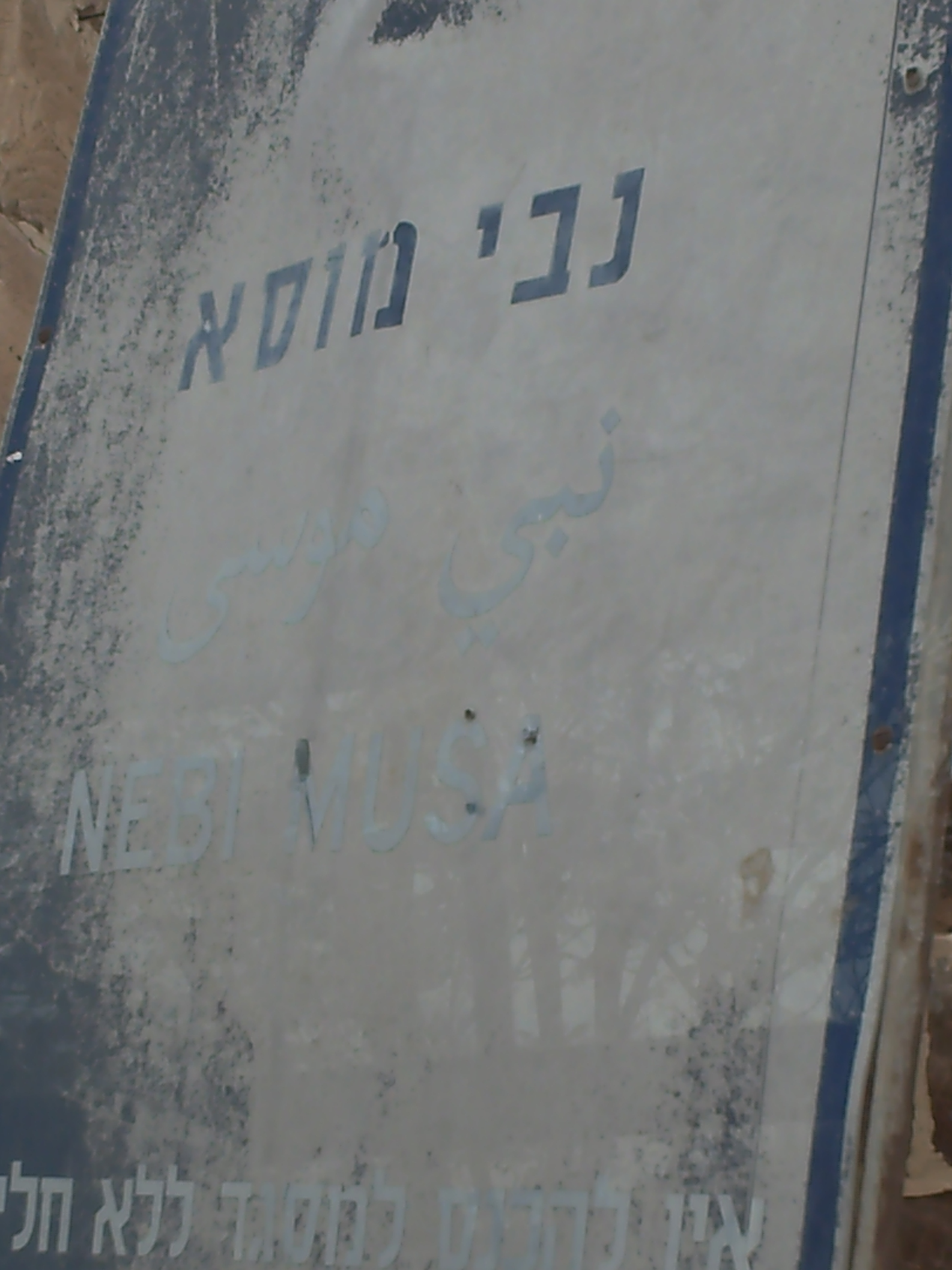
Trilingual sign, 1970

== Procession: old descriptions ==
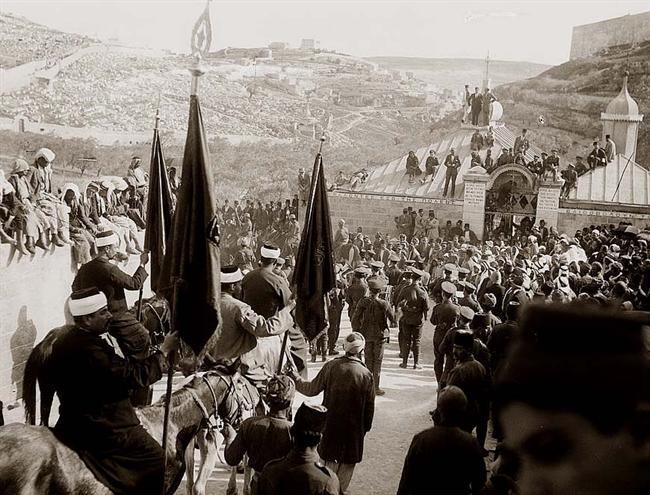
Prelude to the 1920 Nebi Musa riots, Nabi Musa festival, Jerusalem, 1920

The journalist Philip Perceval Graves, the brother of the poet and mythographer Robert Graves, described the re-entry of worshipers from the countryside into Jerusalem as they passed through the Jaffa Gate in a book published in 1923:

As they entered the old city, the enthusiasm of the crowds reached its highest intensity. Men with the set blank stare of extreme excitement danced round and round, bareheaded, their long locks flying wildly as they revolved. . . Last came the green banner of Hebron surrounded by a guard of ten wiry swordsmen. Proudly they walked with their flag, until they came to where the narrow Street of David plunges down into the labyrinth of the old city. For the last time they whirled their bright blades above their heads and disappeared into the shadows of the streets.

In Letters from Jerusalem: During the Palestine Mandate (1922–25), Eunice Holliday describes the procession to the Tomb of Moses in a letter to her mother as follows:

"The procession was the queerest thing I have ever seen, a more disorganised affair you could not imagine, but then that is typical of the country. The people came along in batches, just a crowd with banner of silk, of all colours, then a crowd dancing - Arabic dancing is a joke - then a crowd singing and waving swords or sticks and, interspersed, groups of mounted police and soldiers to see there was no fighting. Quite the nicest part of the day was to see all the fellaheen (peasants from the villages) in their new clothes. The colours were wonderful, bright pink, purple or blue velvet coats, yellow dresses with embroideries in red and green et cetera, and all wore a white veil. It was a gorgeous sight [...]"

== Palestinian population ==
The census conducted in 1931 by the British Mandate authorities counted at Nabi Musa a population of three males in one house.

The 2007 census undertaken by the Palestinian Central Bureau of Statistics (PCBS) registered a residential population of 309 in 65 housing units, a rise from 45 in 1997 and constituting a "Palestinian local development committee".

In 2012, Nabi Musa has been defined as a "Palestinian locality in the Jericho Governorate" which "has no local authority; as the residents of the locality are nomads who keep moving from one area to another."

== See also ==
- 1920 Nebi Musa riots
- Nabi Rubin
- Religious significance of the Syrian region

== Bibliography ==
- Abu-Rabia, Aref (2001). A Bedouin Century: Education and Development Among the Negev Tribes in the Twentieth Century. Berghahn Books. p. 57. ISBN 1-57181-832-4.
- Amitai, R. (2013). David J Wasserstein, Ami Ayalon (ed.). Some remarks on the inscription of Baybars at Maqam Nabi Musa. Routledge Studies in Middle Eastern History (reprint ed.). Routledge. pp. 45–53. ISBN 9781136579172.
- "An Nabi Musa Locality Profile" (PDF). Palestinian Localities Study. The Applied Research Institute–Jerusalem (ARIJ). 2012. Archived from the original (PDF) on 2017-11-13.
- Boltanski, Emma (December 2005). "The Sanctuary of Nabi Musa". This Week in Palestine. Archived from the original on April 19, 2021.
- Canaan, T. (1927). Mohammedan Saints and Sanctuaries in Palestine. London: Luzac & Co.
- Curtiss, Samuel Ives (2004). Primitive Semitic Religion Today: A Record of Researches, Discoveries and Studies in Syria, Palestine and the Sinaitic Peninsula (Originally published by Fleming H. Revell, 1902 ed.). Wipf and Stock. pp. 163–4, 178. ISBN 9781725210233.
- Dumper, Michael (2002). The Politics of Sacred Space: The Old City of Jerusalem in the Middle East Conflict. Lynne Rienner Publishers. p. 147. ISBN 9781588262264.
- Finn, J. (1878). Elizabeth Anne Finn (ed.). Stirring Times: Or Records from Jerusalem Consular Chronicles of 1853 to 1856. Vol. II. London: C. Kegan Paul & Co. pp. 222–223.
- Frenkel, Yehoshua (1997). Lev, Yaacov (ed.). The Impact of the Crusades on Rural Society and Religious Endowments: The Case of Medieval Syria (Bilad al-Sham). The Medieval Mediterranean: Peoples, Economies and Cultures, 400–1453. Vol. 9. Brill. pp. 237–248. ISBN 9789004100329.
- Friedland, Roger; Hecht, Richard (1996). Bryan F. LeBeau and Menahem Mor (ed.). The Nebi Musa Pilgrimage and the Origins of Palestinian Nationalism. Omaha, Nebr.: Creighton University Press. pp. 89–118. ISBN 9781881871156.
- Gonen, Rivka (2003). Contested Holiness: Jewish, Muslim, and Christian Perspectives on the Temple. Brooklyn, New York: KTAV Publishing House. p. 138. ISBN 9780881257984.
- Graves, P. (1923). Palestine: The Land of Three Faiths. London: Jonathan Cape. p. 97 (cited in Hunt Janin, Four Paths to Jerusalem: Jewish, Christian, Muslim, and Secular Pilgrimages: 1000 BCE to 2001 CE, McFarland, Jefferson, North Carolina 2002 p.193). ISBN 9780786412648.
- Halabi, Awad (2015). Lena Jayyusi (ed.). Islamic Ritual and Palestinian Nationalism: Al-Hajj Muhammad Amin al-Husayni and the Nabi Musa Festival, 1921-1937. Olive Branch Press. pp. 139–161. ISBN 9781566567879.
- Halabi, Awad; Andrew Strathern (2018). Pamela J. Stewart (ed.). "The Transformation of the Prophet Moses Festival in Late Ottoman Jerusalem (1850–1917): From Traditional Pilgrimage to Civil Ritual". Journal of Ritual Studies. 32 (2): 1–15. JSTOR 45217795.
- Hobsbawm, E. (1983) [1983]. Eric Hobsbawm and Terence Ranger (ed.). Introduction: Inventing Traditions. Cambridge and New York: Cambridge University Press. pp. 1–14. ISBN 9780521437738.
- Holliday, Eunice; Holliday, John C. (1997). Letters from Jerusalem: During the Palestine Mandate. The Radcliffe Press. pp. 22–23. ISBN 1860640850.
- Ibn Katheer (2001). Noha Kamal Ed-Din (ed.). The Death of Moses (2nd ed.). Al-Mansoura, Egypt: Dar al-Manarah For Translation, Publishing & Distribution. p. 243. ISBN 977-6005-17-9.
- Kupferschmidt, Uri M. (1987). The Supreme Muslim Council: Islam Under the British Mandate for Palestine. The Encyclopaedia of Islam, Volume 6, Part 105106 (no online access). Brill. p. 231. ISBN 978-9-0040-7929-8.
- Lonely Planet guide 2010 (Amelia Thomas, Michael Kohn, Miriam Raphael & Dan Savery Raz) (2010). Israel & the Palestinian Territories. Lonely Planet. p. 319. ISBN 9781741044560.
- Manna, A. (1983). Yehoshua Ben-Arieh and Israel Bartal (ed.). The Development of the Cultural Identity of Arab Society in the Land of Israel (in Hebrew). Jerusalem: Keter Publishing. pp. 178–180.
- Marti, Karl; Schick, C. (1880). "Mitteilungen von Baurat C. Schick in Jerusalem über die alten Lauren und Klöster in der Wüste Juda". Zeitschrift des Deutschen Palästina-Vereins. 3: 1–43. (Marti and Schick, 1880, p. 16)
- Mills, Eric, Assistant Chief Secretary of the Palestine government (1932). Census of Palestine 1931 (PDF). Jerusalem. p. 45.
- Murphy-O'Connor, J. (2008). The Holy Land: An Oxford Archaeological Guide from Earliest Times to 1700. Oxford Archaeological Guides (5 ed.). Oxford University Press. pp. 417–418. ISBN 978-0-1915-2867-5.
- Pappé, Ilan (2000). "The Rise and Fall of the Husaynis, 1840-1922 (part 1)". Jerusalem Quarterly (10): 27–38. doi:10.70190/jq.I10.p27.
- Sorek, Tamir (2013). "Calendars, Martyrs, and Palestinian Particularism under British Rule". Journal of Palestine Studies. 43 (1 (Autumn 2013)). University of California Press on behalf of the Institute for Palestine Studies: 6-23 [19, footnote 4]. doi:10.1525/jps.2013.43.1.6. JSTOR 10.1525/jps.2013.43.1.6.
- Swedenburg, Ted (1999). Ilan Pappé (ed.). Chapter 7: The Role of the Palestinian Peasantry in the Great Revolt (1936-1939). London: Routledge. pp. 129–167 [137–138].
- Vermeulen, Urbain (2001). Egypt and Syria in the Fatimid, Ayyubid, and Mamluk Eras III: Proceedings of the 6th, 7th and 8th International Colloquium Organized at the Katholieke Universiteit Leuven in May 1997, 1998, and 1999. Peeters Publishers. p. 364. ISBN 9789042909700.
