= Megilot Regional Council =

Israeli regional council in the West Bank

Coordinates: 31°49′34.17″N 35°25′56.52″E

Megilot מגילות
- Regional council (from 1981)
- Interactive map of Megilot
- Region: Israel
- District: Judea and Samaria Area

Government
  - Head of Municipality: Aryeh Cohen

Population (2024)
  - Total: 2,786
- Website: Official website

Megilot Regional Council (Hebrew: מועצה אזורית מגילות, Mo'atza Azorit Megilot), also Megilot Dead Sea Regional Council, is a regional council in the Judean Desert of Israel, near the western shores of the Dead Sea. It covers seven Israeli settlements. With only about 2,800 residents, it is one of Israel's smallest regional councils. Its municipal offices are located in Vered Yeriho.

== Etymology ==
The name "Megilot" means scrolls. It refers to the fact that the Dead Sea Scrolls were discovered in Qumran, which lies within the council's governing area, near Kalya.

== Communities ==
There are seven communities in the council: four kibbutzim, one moshav, and two other communities.

=== Kibbutzim ===
- Almog
- Beit HaArava
- Mitzpe Shalem
- Kalya

=== Moshav ===
- Vered Yeriho

=== Other communities ===
- Beit Hogla
- Ovnat

== Demographics ==
Historical population
Year	Pop.	±%
1983	400	—
1995	600	+50.0%
2008	1,000	+66.7%
2022	2,243	+124.3%
2024	2,786	+24.2%

== Voting Patterns ==
In the 2022 election, 56 percent of voters in the regional council voted for the parties of the center-left coalition led by Yair Lapid, while 44 percent voted for the parties of the right-wing coalition led by Benjamin Netanyahu and 0.1 percent voted for the Arab parties.

In the 2026 election, 47 percent of voters in the regional council voted for the parties of the center-left coalition led by Gadi Eisenkot, while 42 percent voted for the parties of the right-wing coalition led by Benjamin Netanyahu and no votes were cast for the Arab parties. An additional 5 percent voted for the Reservists, and 6.2 percent voted for Amcha Yisrael. Voter turnout increased 33 percent from the 2022 election.
