= Vered Yeriho =

Israeli settlement in the West Bank

Vered Yeriho: וֶרֶד יְרִיחוֹ (Hebrew)
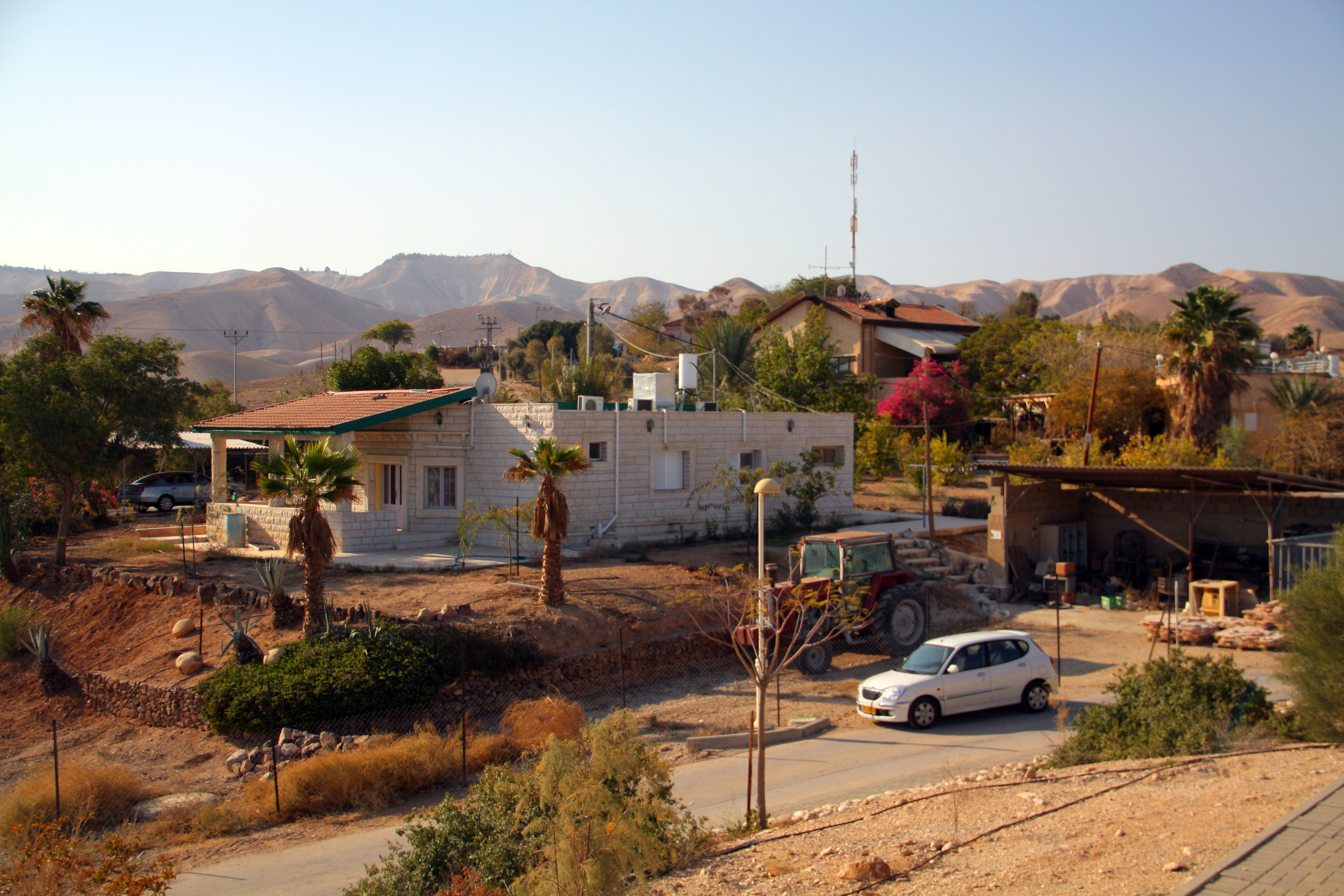
- Rose of Jericho

- Location within the Central West Bank
- Coordinates: 31°49′35″N 35°25′54″E
- Country: Palestine
- District: Judea and Samaria Area
- Council: Megilot
- Region: West Bank
- Affiliation: Agricultural Union
- Founded: 1979
- Population (2024): 420

Vered Yeriho (Hebrew: וֶרֶד יְרִיחוֹ, lit. 'Rose of Jericho') is an Israeli settlement organized as a moshav in the West Bank. Located near Jericho in the Jordan Valley, it falls under the jurisdiction of Megilot Regional Council. In 2024 it had a population of 420.

The international community considers Israeli settlements in the West Bank illegal under international law, but the Israeli government disputes this.

== History ==
=== Establishment ===
The settlement was established following a split between the secular and religious groups in the community of Mitzpe Yeriho, which had been founded in 1977, after a decision by the Ministerial Committee on Settlement to resolve the dispute. The establishment of the new community began in April 1980. A core group affiliated with the Agricultural Union settled the site in November 1980; however, the secular residents of Mitzpe Yeriho refused to join them, arguing that they did not wish to settle in the Jordan Valley but rather near the existing settlement, which was closer to Jerusalem.

According to the Palestinian NGO ARIJ, in 1978 Israel confiscated 618 dunams of land from the site of Nabi Musa in order to construct Vered Yeriho. In the area of Vered Yeriho, an ancient structure dating to the late 7th and early 6th centuries BC, from the period of the Kingdom of Judah, was discovered. It is unclear whether the structure served as a fort, a farmstead, or a cultic site. A 1.04-meter-long double-edged sword from the Iron Age (Israelite period) was also discovered at the site. It is the largest Iron Age sword found in Israel.

The inauguration ceremony for the settlement took place on 30 December 1980 in the presence of Minister of Agriculture Ariel Sharon.

Temporarily, the moshav was called Mitzpe Yeriho B. Its permanent name, Vered Yeriho, was taken from the verse "I grew tall like a palm tree in En-gedi, and like rose plants in Jericho" from the Book of Sirach.

=== 1980s and 1990s ===
From its first day the community suffered from economic difficulties. The settlers financed the construction of houses and agricultural infrastructure out of their own pockets through the Agricultural Union. The rapidly rising inflation in Israel in 1984 and 1985 worsened the crisis, and in 1986 the residents were forced to abandon the settlement after the national water company Mekorot cut off the settlement's water supply due to unpaid water bills. In the 1990s, as part of the Moshavim debt arrangement and following the enactment of the Gal Law, the moshav's debts were written off.

Following the Gaza–Jericho Agreement in May 1994, the city of Jericho was transferred to the control of the Palestinian Authority, including the Aqabat Jaber refugee camp, located about 500 meters north of the settlement. The area subsequently experienced economic growth. Increased tourism led many residents to abandon agriculture and establish bed and breakfast accommodations. In 1998, the Jericho Casino was opened near the moshav and attracted hundreds of Israeli gamblers each day. Residents of the moshav set up a currency-exchange booth near the casino.

=== Since 2000 ===
In September 2000, the outbreak of the Second Intifada brought the casino's activity to a halt and caused the collapse of tourism in the area, resulting in renewed economic difficulties for the community. On 13 November 2000, gunmen under the command of Tawfik Tirawi fired at Vered Yeriho from the casino building. The Israel Defense Forces responded by firing tank shells at the building, partially destroying it. In April 2001 the casino was quickly renovated and prepared to reopen, but the IDF began prohibiting Israeli civilians from entering Area A, and it remained abandoned.

In 2009, the construction company Bnei Amana began building houses as part of a community expansion project in the moshav.
