= Highway 90 (Israel–Palestine) =

Highway in Israel and Palestine

Coordinates: 31°22′24″N 35°23′02″E

Highway 90
- כביש 90
- Highway 90 highlighted in red
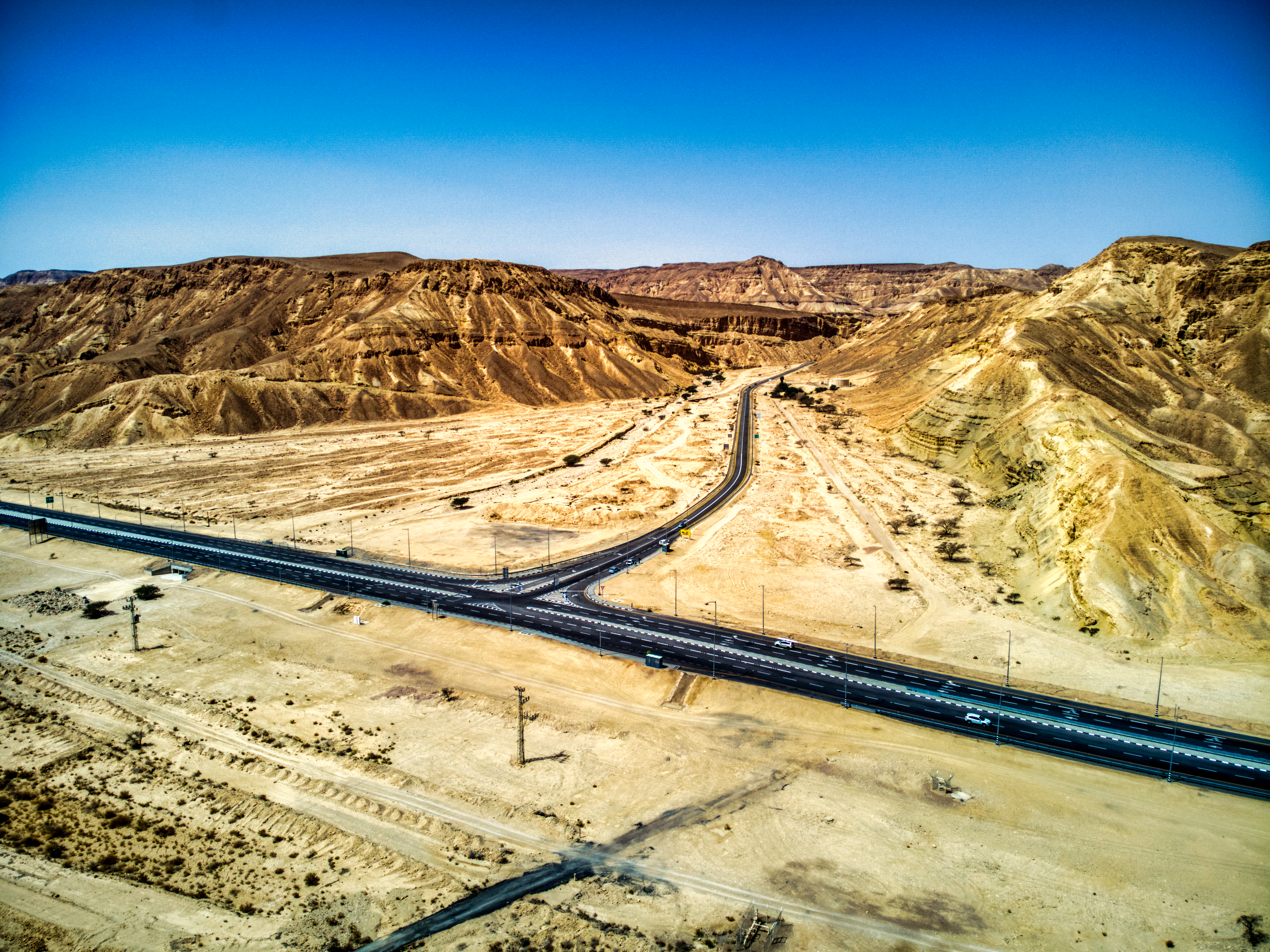
- Ketura Junction

Route information
- Length: 478.7 km (297.5 mi)

Major junctions
- South end: Taba Border Crossing with Egypt
- North end: Fatima Gate Border Crossing with Lebanon

Location
- Country: Israel

Highway system
- Roads in Israel; Highways
| ← Highway 89 | → Highway 91 |

Highway 90 is the longest Israeli road, at about 480 kilometres (300 mi), and stretches from Metula and the northern border with Lebanon, along the western side of the Sea of Galilee, through the Jordan Valley, along the Dead Sea's western bank (making it the world's lowest road), through the Arava Valley, and until Eilat and the southern border with Egypt on the Red Sea. The central section of the road traverses the Israeli-occupied West Bank. While it passes near the city of Jericho, it runs through Area C and does not enter areas controlled by the Palestinian Authority.

The Arava Highway segment is the main link from the resort and port city of Eilat towards the country's centre and, at times, handles a heavy mix of local, tourist and commercial trucking traffic on the two-lane road (one lane in each direction). That, coupled with the monotonous nature of the desert landscape around it and the lack of a physical barrier between the opposing lanes of traffic, makes the road particularly prone to traffic accidents, which often occur at high speeds – earning it the nickname "The Red Road."

== Highway ==
The section of Highway 90 passing through the Jordan Valley was dedicated as Derekh Gandi (Gandhi's Road) after the late Rehavam Zeevi, an Israeli Minister of Tourism.

The section of Route 90 passing the Dead Sea is named Dead Sea Highway and is the lowest road in the world. It is along this stretch of road that Masada, Ein Gedi nature reserve, Ein Gedi Spa, Qumran Caves, and Ahava are located. It is here that Route 90 intersects with Route 1, making it a major international tourism artery for travellers between the Sea of Galilee, Jerusalem and the Dead Sea.

There is no actual four-way intersection with Route 1. When travelling south along 90 from the Jordan Valley, the road intersects the eastern end of Route 1 at Beit HaArava Junction. Route 90 continues by turning left at the junction, then again turns south. A short distance later, Route 90 continues via a right turn at Lido Junction.

The section of Route 90 passing through the Arabah is named Arava Highway. When built, the Arabah section of the proposed Railway to Eilat will be located near the Arava Highway in many places along the route.

== History ==
The northernmost section of the highway, from Tiberias to Metula, is the oldest, having existed since the Ottoman period.

Until the 1960s, a series of separate roads existed where the highway is today. After the Six-Day War, a section in the northern Dead Sea area was completed, making these roads contiguous. In the early 1980s, the road was assigned the number 90.

In October 2007, Israeli Transport Minister Shaul Mofaz announced that the 170 km section of Highway 90 between Arava Junction and Eilat would be renovated, widened and repaved in stages to a four-lane configuration with a physical barrier in the middle and rest stops every 45 kilometres. Initial announced funding was NIS125 million; the total project budget for all stages of widening is NIS2.3 billion (equivalent to over US$650 million in 2013 dollars). As of the fall of 2013, 40 km of the highway had been widened by the National Roads Company, from Eilat to Yotvata.

On 9 November 2018, Route 90 collapsed above Kidron Stream, 10 km south to Kalya, near Ovnat, due to a flood that created a sinkhole.

As of 2020, the section between Yotvata and Ketura (to the intersection with Highway 40) is undergoing widening. No date has been set yet for widening the long stretch of highway between Ketura and the Arava Junction.

== Checkpoints ==
Route 90 has two permanent checkpoints: the Beit She'an-Bardala checkpoint in the north, near Sdei Trumot and the Bezeq Stream, and one in the south just north of Ein Gedi. Palestinians living in the West Bank are not allowed to pass these checkpoints unless permits from the Israeli authorities are obtained. According to B'Tselem, at the Beit She'an-Bardala checkpoint, during certain agricultural seasons, Palestinian trucks transporting agricultural produce are allowed to cross twice a week. Palestinians are often stopped and turned back for not having the correct papers, at the Beit Ha'arava checkpoint leading to the Dead Sea.

== Accidents ==
Route 90 is one of Israel's most dangerous highways. Between 2003 and 2018, there were over 2,250 road accidents on Route 90, in which 223 people were killed and over 6,450 people were hurt, 700 of them seriously. Oz Dror, spokesperson for Or Yarok, the Association for Safer Driving in Israel, said in 2018: "Route 90 continues to claim victims and take lives as a result of a shaky infrastructure that is not forgiving of drivers' mistakes. It is always easier to blame the driver and the human factor, but the Ministry of Transport and Road Safety is also responsible. The road was paved 50 years ago, and many years ago, it was necessary to improve the infrastructure and turn it from a red road to a safe road. A separation railing must be installed between the lanes to prevent head-on accidents as early as tomorrow morning to prevent the next casualty. Road accidents are not fate but failure."

On 6 January 2022, a traffic collision between a truck and minibus killed eight people and injured two others in the West Bank. The crash occurred at Petzal Junction. President of Palestine Mahmoud Abbas declared a day of mourning. Defence Minister of Israel Benny Gantz tweeted his condolences to the victims. On 7 January, the day after the accident, many Palestinians gathered in Aqraba, a Palestinian town in Samaria, for the joint funeral.

== Attempts to block ==
While blocking a route is a criminal offence in Israel, some attempts to block the road have been made in recent years.

- During March 2011 Israeli social workers' demonstrations, an attempt was made to block route 90.
- In April 2011, a group of people attempted to cycle from Nablus to Jericho, partially on road 90, as a celebration of Israeli rule over the West Bank.
- On 14 April 2012, approximately 200 cyclists tried to join the road and were stopped by Lt. Col. Eisner. The incident became an international scandal resulting in Eisner being suspended.
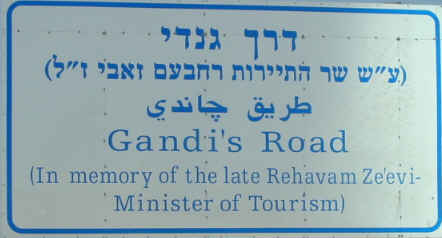
A memorial road sign on Route 90 dedicating the route in memory of the late Rehavam Zeevi

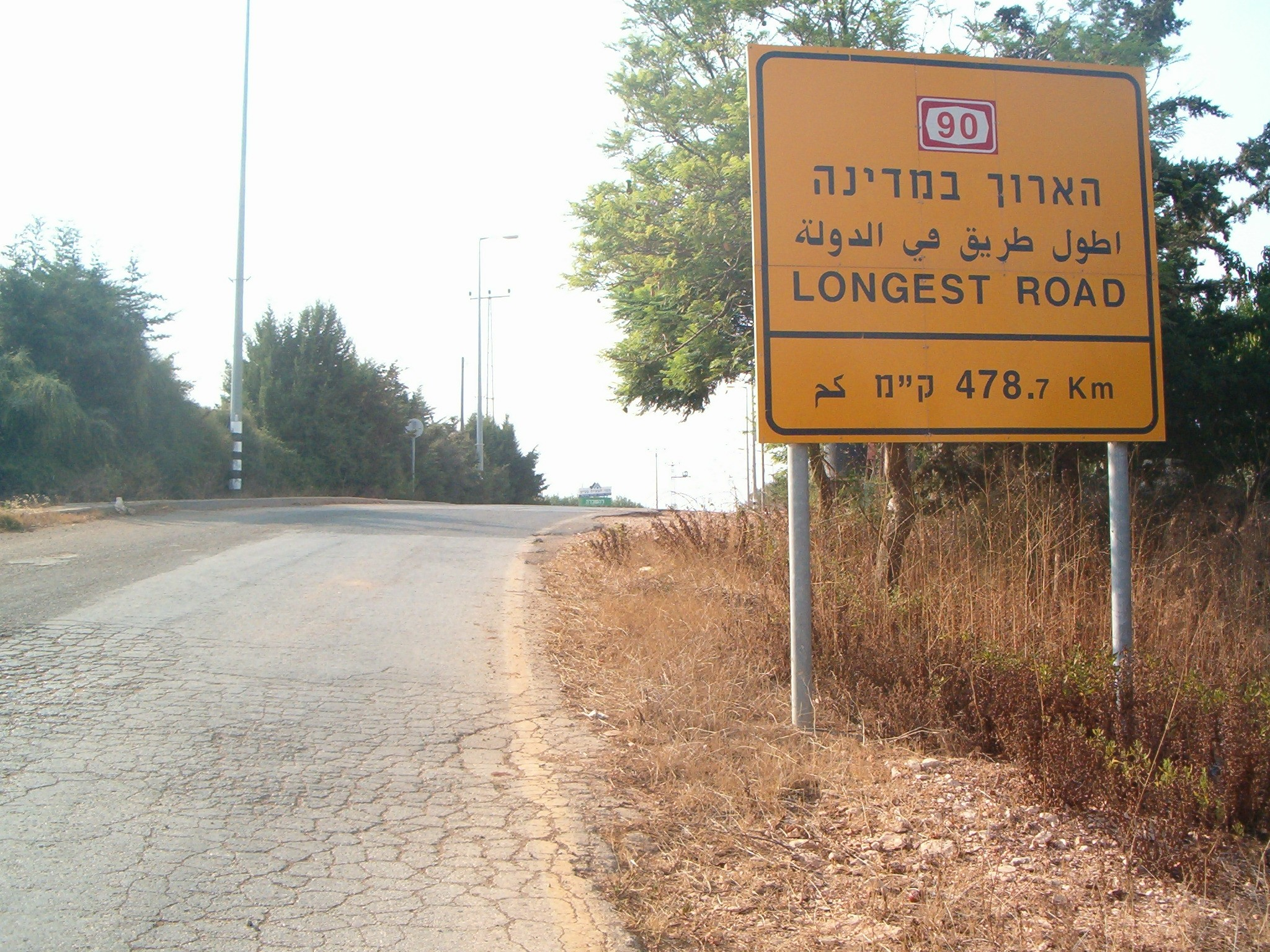
A sign near the north edge of Route 90: the country's longest road – 478.7 kilometres

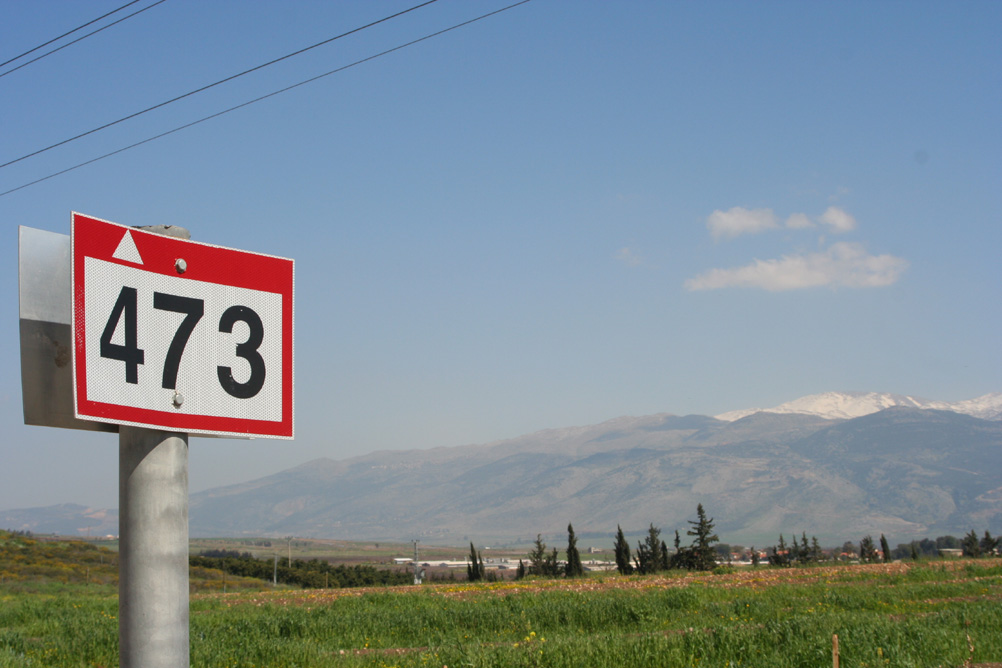
Route 90 near Kfar Giladi, in the Hula Valley and below Mt. Hermon

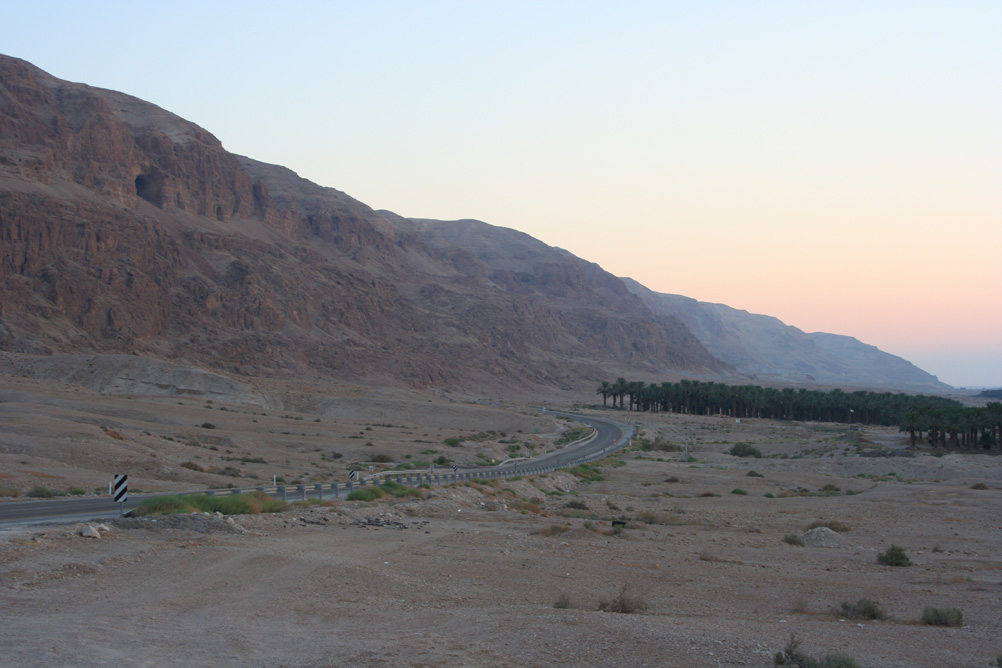
Route 90 along the Dead Sea

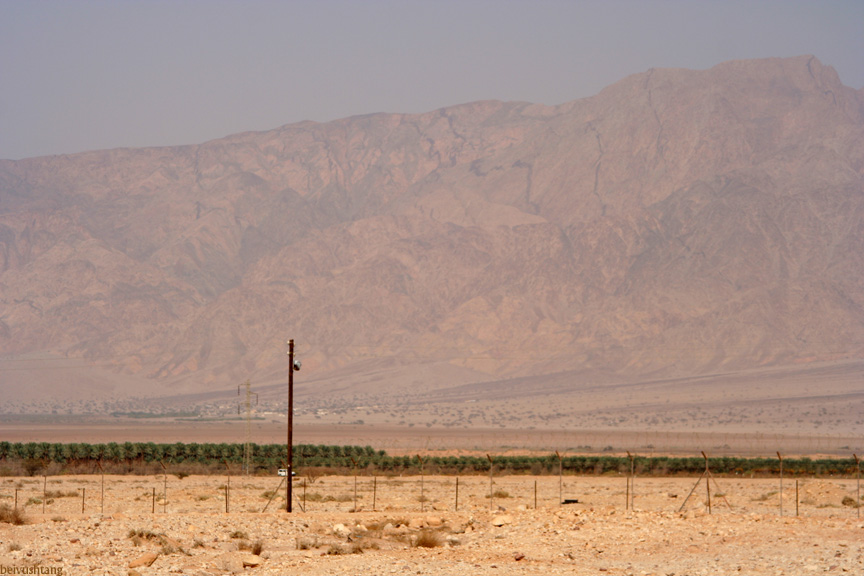
Route 90 in the Arava, just north of Eilat

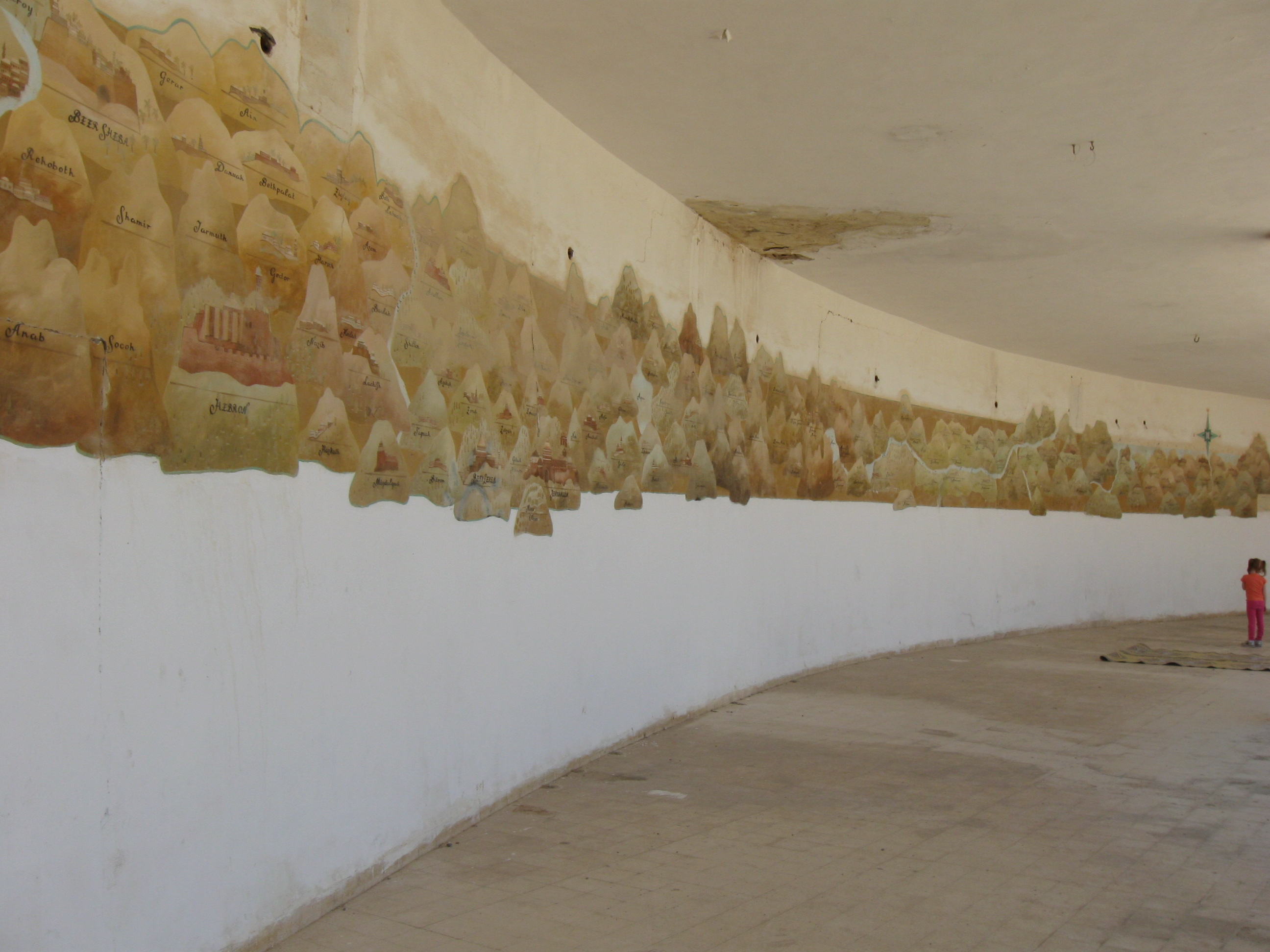
Wall painting in an abandoned restaurant near Lido junction

== See also ==
- Highway 65 (Jordan) – The parallel road on the Jordanian side of the border
- Tsemah Junction at the southern tip of the Sea of Galilee
