= Kalya =

Israeli settlement in the West Bank

Kalya: קַלְיָה (Hebrew)
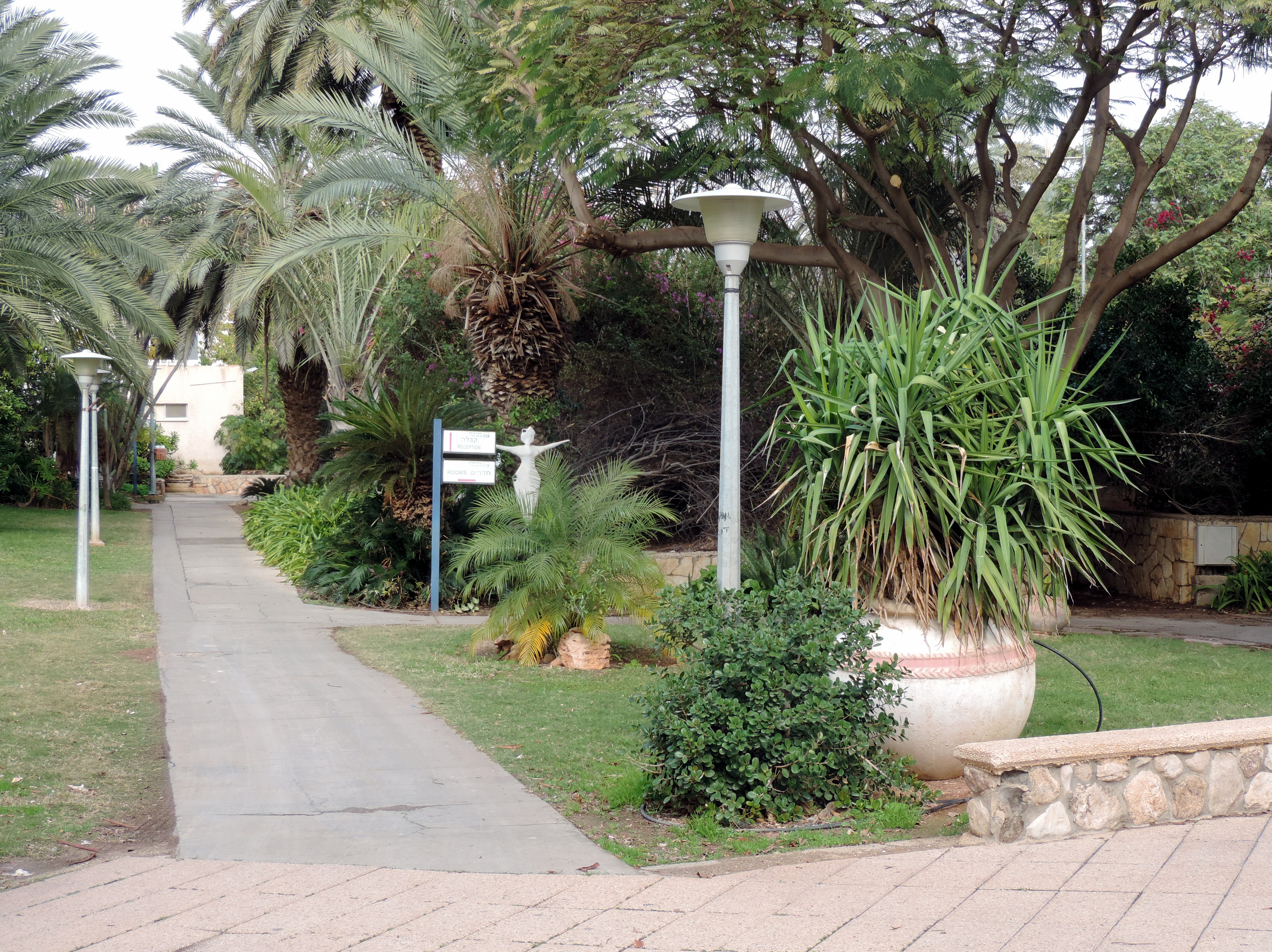
- Kibbutz Kalya

- Location within the Central West Bank
- Coordinates: 31°44′55″N 35°27′58″E
- Country: Palestine
- District: Judea and Samaria Area
- Council: Megilot
- Region: West Bank
- Affiliation: Kibbutz Movement
- Founded: 1929 (original); 1968 (current)
- Founder: Dead Sea Works employees
- Population (2024): 585
- Website: www.kalia.org.il

Kalya (Hebrew: קַלְיָה) is an Israeli settlement organized as a kibbutz in the West Bank. It was originally established in 1929 but was occupied and destroyed by the Jordanians in 1948; it was later rebuilt in 1968 after the Six-Day War. Located on the northern shore of the Dead Sea, 360 meters below sea level, it falls under the jurisdiction of Megilot Regional Council. In 2024 it had a population of 585.

The international community considers Israeli settlements in the West Bank illegal under international law, but the Israeli government disputes this.

== Etymology ==
The name Kalya is derived from kalium, the Latin name for potassium, a chemical found in abundance in the region. Kalya is also a Hebrew acronym for "קם לתחייה ים המוות" (Kam Litkhiya Yam HaMavet), literally, the Dead Sea has returned to life.

== History ==
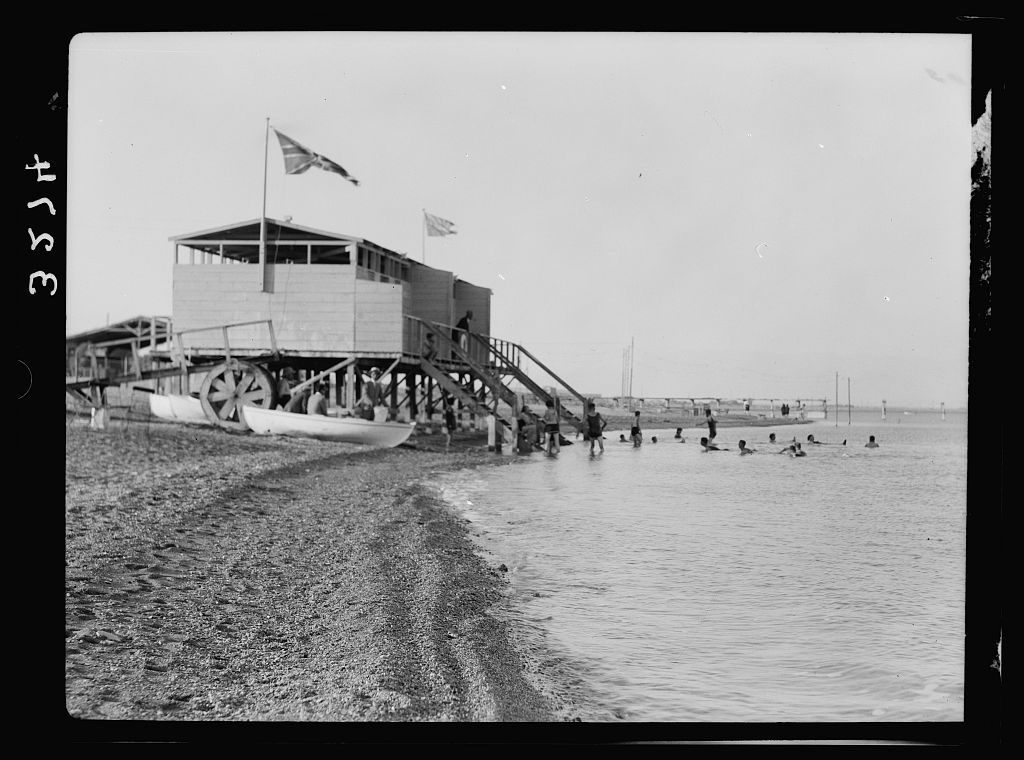
Kalya beach, 1920

The kibbutz was first established during the British Mandate era. Moshe Novomeysky, a Jewish engineer from Siberia, won the British government tender for potash mining on the Dead Sea's northern shore, the marshland surrounding the plant was drained and housing was built to accommodate employees of the Palestine Potash Company. The company, chartered in 1929, set up its first plant on the north shore of the Dead Sea at Kalya and produced potash, or potassium chloride, by solar evaporation of the brine. It employed both Arabs and Jews.

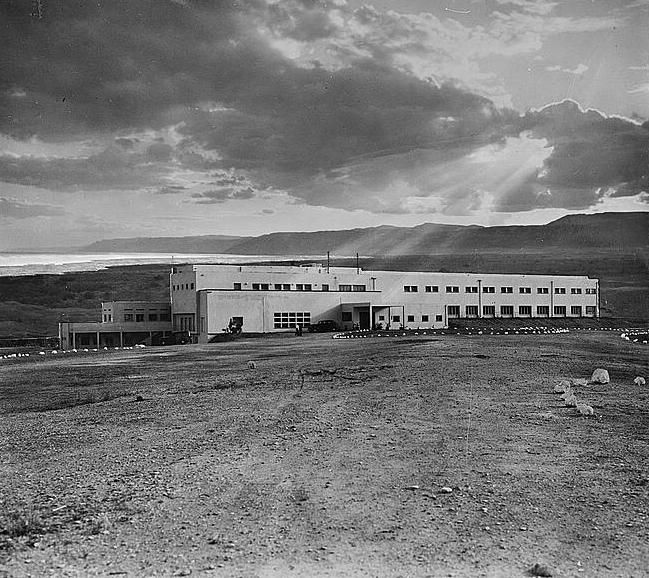
Kalya Hotel in the 1930s

Kalya was spared violence in the 1936–39 Arab revolt due to good relations with the Arabs; the plant employed many Arab laborers from Jericho. Despite negotiations between the kibbutz leadership and Jordan's Arab Legion to preserve the kibbutz under Jordanian control at the time of the 1948 Arab–Israeli War, the imprisonment of Jews in the Jordanian-held Naharayim complex and the Kfar Etzion massacre led David Ben-Gurion to call for the residents' evacuation and their consolidation in the southern Dead Sea. Residents of Kalya and nearby Beit HaArava ultimately fled by boat on 20 May 1948, and the two kibbutzim were destroyed by the Jordanians. The area remained unpopulated save a Jordanian military camp.

Following Israel's occupation of the West Bank from Jordan in the 1967 Six-Day War, Kalya was re-established as a paramilitary Nahal settlement in 1968, the first in the area. Civilians temporarily settled in the deserted Jordanian army camp in 1972 while planting the first date palms and building permanent houses. The completed homes were populated in 1974.

According to ARIJ, Israel expropriated 955 dunums of land in 1968 from the Palestinian village of as-Sawahira ash-Sharqiya in order to construct Kalya.

== Economy ==
Kalya has a population of 300 and depends mainly on agriculture, primarily consisting of dairy farming and raising date palms, watermelons and cherry tomatoes. The kibbutz also runs the Israel Nature and Parks Authority visitor's centre of the nearby Qumran Caves, where the Dead Sea Scrolls were found. At one time, the kibbutz operated a water park.

The kibbutz serves as a rest stop between Jerusalem and Ein Gedi due to its proximity to the Beit HaArava Junction between Highway 90 and Highway 1.

=== Beach ===
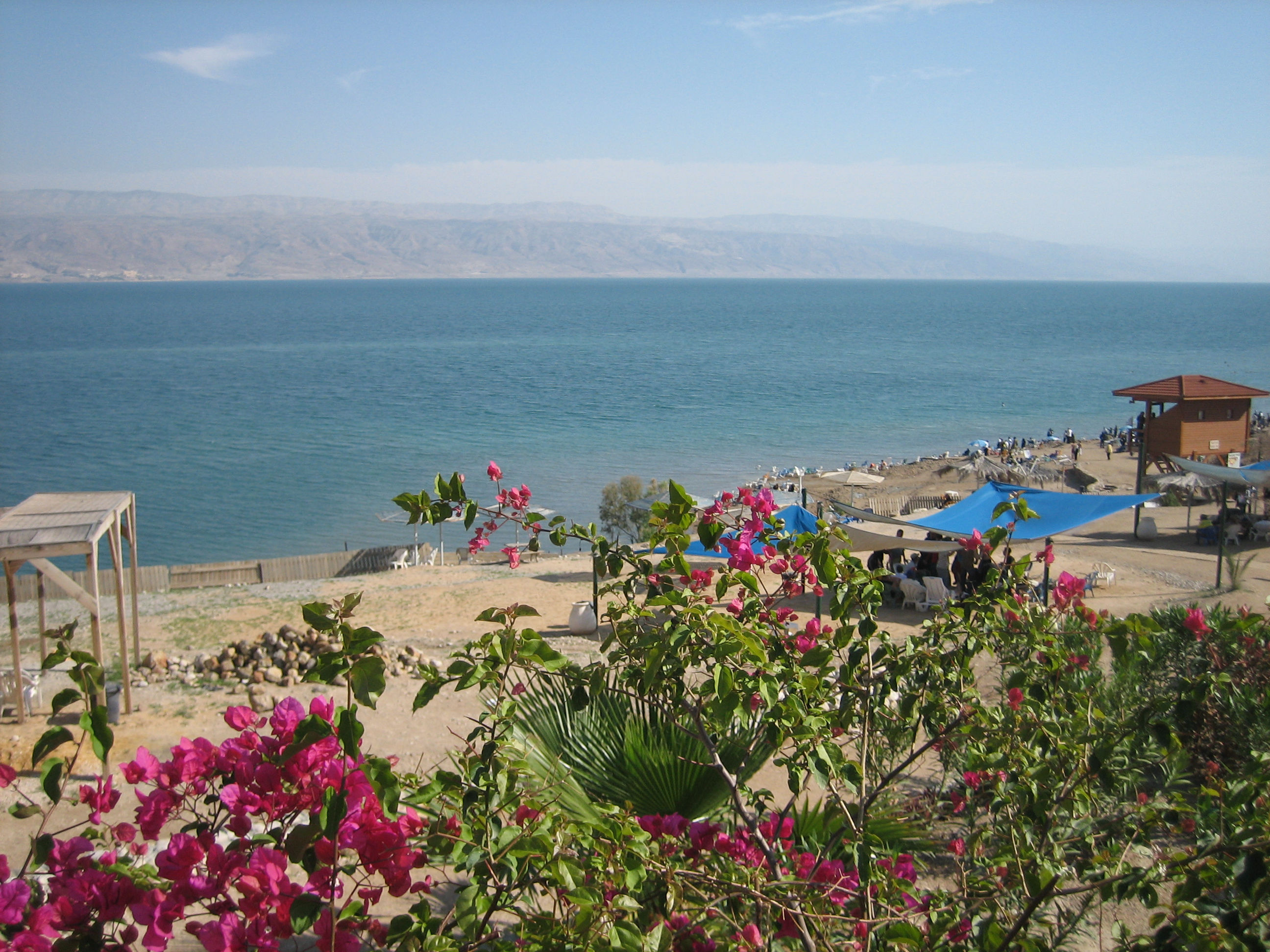
Kalya Beach today

A private beach run by the kibbutz is popular with Israelis, Christian pilgrims and tourists. The wooden building near the seashore where people can drink, eat and chat is rightly called the lowest bar in the world (–417), some lower of the entrance one. Since the easing of travel restrictions in the West Bank and the removal of major roadblocks, Palestinians also come to swim there. However, Palestinians were regularly barred from reaching any Dead Sea beaches for fear that Arab presence would cause loss of Jewish customers for establishments along the shore. This was enforced by the Israeli military at Beit Ha'arava checkpoint on Highway 90.
