= Lisan Peninsula =

Coordinates: 31°15′N 35°27′E

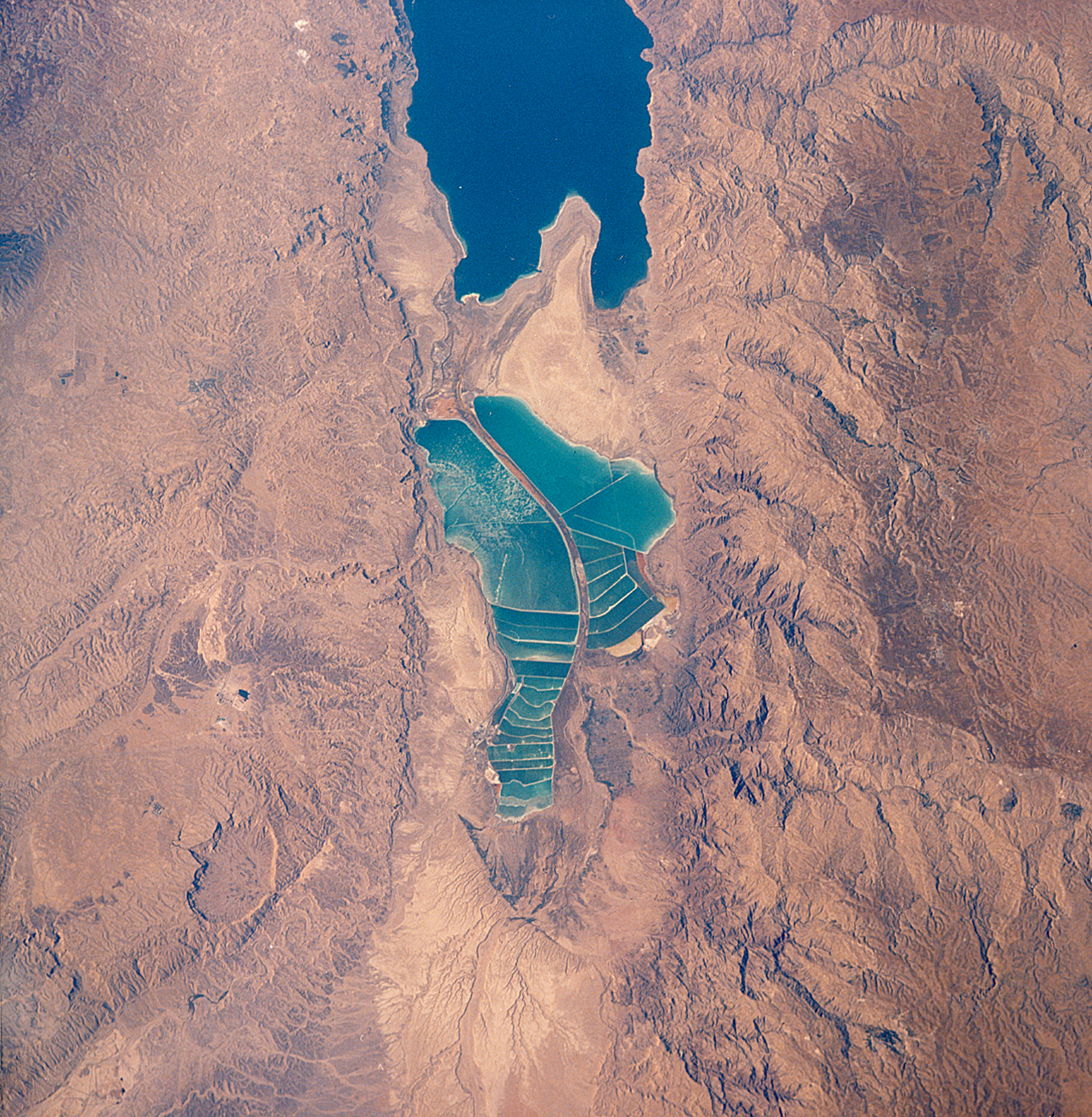
The Lisan Peninsula has expanded until it now completely severs the Dead Sea into two parts

The Lisan Peninsula is a large spit of land that now separates the North and the South basins of the Dead Sea. Its name is Arabic for "tongue". The peninsula, located entirely within Jordanian territory, separates the northern section of the Dead Sea from its shallow southern part. The northern tip is labeled as Cape Costigan, in memory of Christopher Costigan, an Irish explorer who perished in 1835 from heat and thirst after being stranded on the sea for days. He took the first known boat ride on the sea in modern times. The south-western tip is labeled as Cape Molyneux, in memory of Thomas Howard Molyneux, an officer in the British Royal Navy who explored the Dead Sea in August 1847 and perished following his return from the journey.

The dried water strait between the Lisan and the western coast of the Dead Sea is named Lynch Strait, after William Francis Lynch who explored the Dead Sea area in 1848.

Similarly to the nearby Mount Sodom (Jebel Usdum), the peninsula is largely made up of white calcareous sediment containing beds of salt and gypsum, rising to 600 feet (180 m) on its eastern side.

== Archaeology ==
Archaeological work on the Lisan Peninsula has revealed several ancient monasteries. One of these is the Lavra Monastery of Dayr al-Qaṭṭār, a small single-aisled church with adjoining domestic rooms, preserved wall remains, and a white mosaic floor marked by an interlaced cross. Surrounding the monastery are hermits' cells cut into the marl, with carved crosses and Greek-language graffiti, including the name of a hermit called Elias. The site was probably used by ascetics traveling from the Judaean Desert, which lies to the west.

About three kilometers to the northwest lies the hermitage of Qaṣr aṭ-Ṭūba, a partly carved, partly built complex of rooms arranged around open corridors and a paved southern courtyard. Its walls feature crosses and a Greek inscription naming four hermits, Agapios, Konstantinos, Makarios, and Ioannis, and nearby excavations have uncovered a water cistern and inscribed papyri fragments.

== See also ==
- Zahrat adh-Dhraʻ 2
