= Zahrat adh-Dhraʻ 2 =

Neolithic archaeological site on the Lisan Peninsula, Jordan

Zahrat adh-Dhraʻ 2 (ZAD 2)
- Location within Jordan
- 31.255°N 35.566111°E
- Type: Tell
- Periods: PPNA / PPNB
- Cultures: Neolithic
- Region: Jordan

Site notes
- Area: 2,000 square metres (0.20 ha)
- Excavation dates: 1999, 2001, 2002
- Archaeologists: Phillip C. Edwards
- Condition: Ruins

Zahrat adh-Dhraʻ 2 or ZAD 2 is an early Neolithic archeological site 1 mile (1.6 km) north of the village of edh-Dhra on the Lisan Peninsula, in modern-day Jordan.

The site is a low, small tell mound, located in what is now an arid region that would have been far more hospitable during the settlement's occupation. It sits at an altitude of 650 feet (200 m) below sea level. Excavations were carried out to a depth of 1.5 metres (4.9 ft) in 1999 by Phillip C. Edwards of La Trobe University. Several rounded stone buildings were found with plaster floors although lime-firing pyrotechnology was probably not used in their preparation. Archaeobotanical studies suggested that cultivation of wild crops was likely to have occurred on site. A large number of flint tools were found including sickles, picks, axes, drills, arrowheads and scrapers made from local flint sources. A few examples of stone tools made from other materials such as quartz, obsidian and quartzite were discovered. Other discoveries included a ceramic figure, greenstone, some copper ore and two incised fragments of burnt limestone showing geometric designs suggesting early Neolithic use of art and symbols. Radiocarbon dates for the site range between 9140 and 8470 BC. This has suggested occupation during the Pre-Pottery Neolithic A and possibly during the transitional phase into the Pre-Pottery Neolithic B between 8800 and 8600 BC that was identified in 2002 by Danielle Stordeur and Frédéric Abbès.

Ghattas Jeries Sayej analyzed the lithic assemblage from the site providing comparison with other sites in the southern Levant. He found little discernible difference between the Khiamian and Sultanian assemblages and argued for an extension of the PPNA and later start of the PPNB in the Southern Levant around 9200 BP.
