= Dead Sea =

Salt lake in the Levant

- البحر الميت (Arabic); ים המלח (Hebrew)
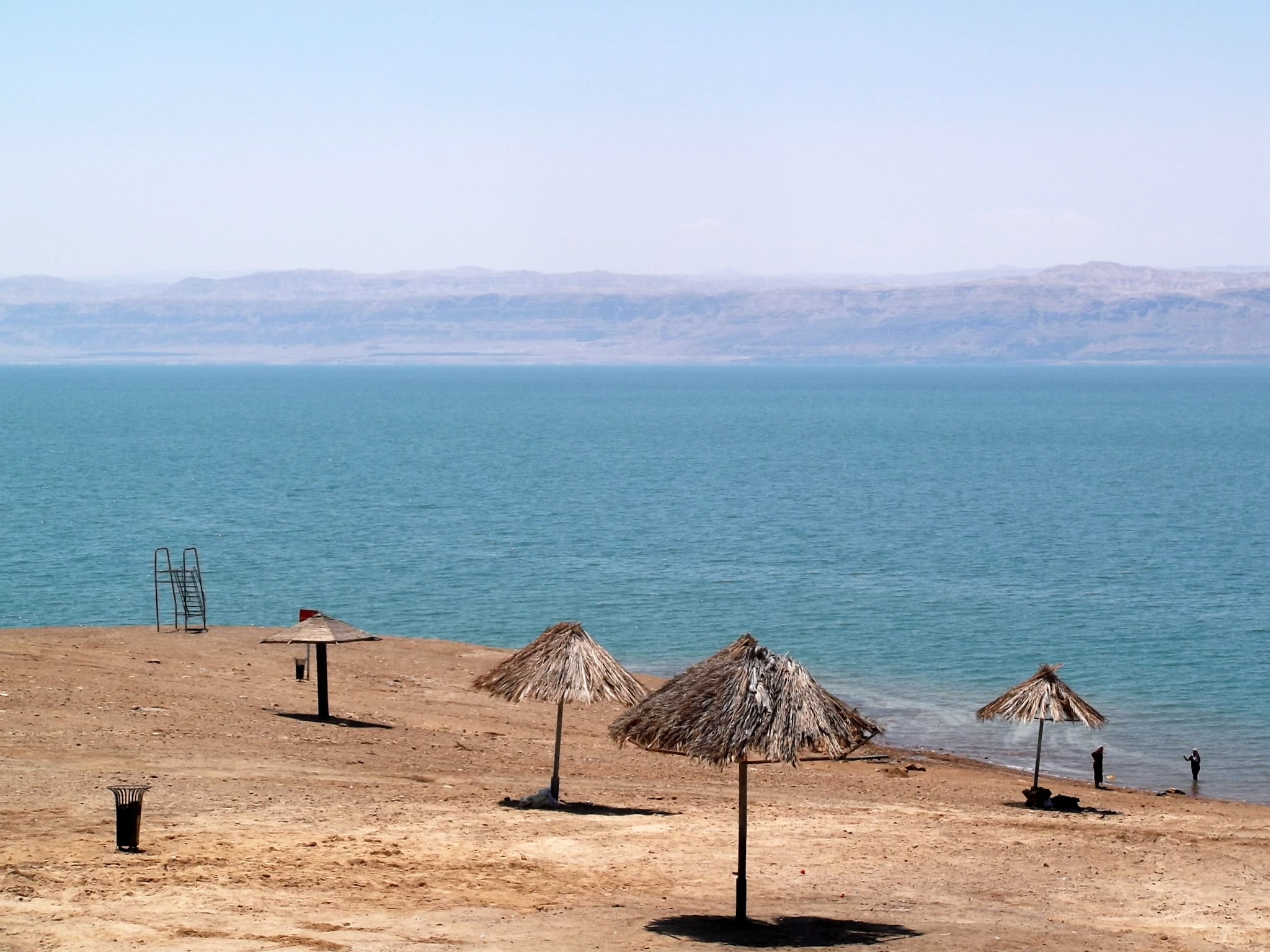
- A view of the sea from the Jordanian shore with the hills of the West Bank in the background

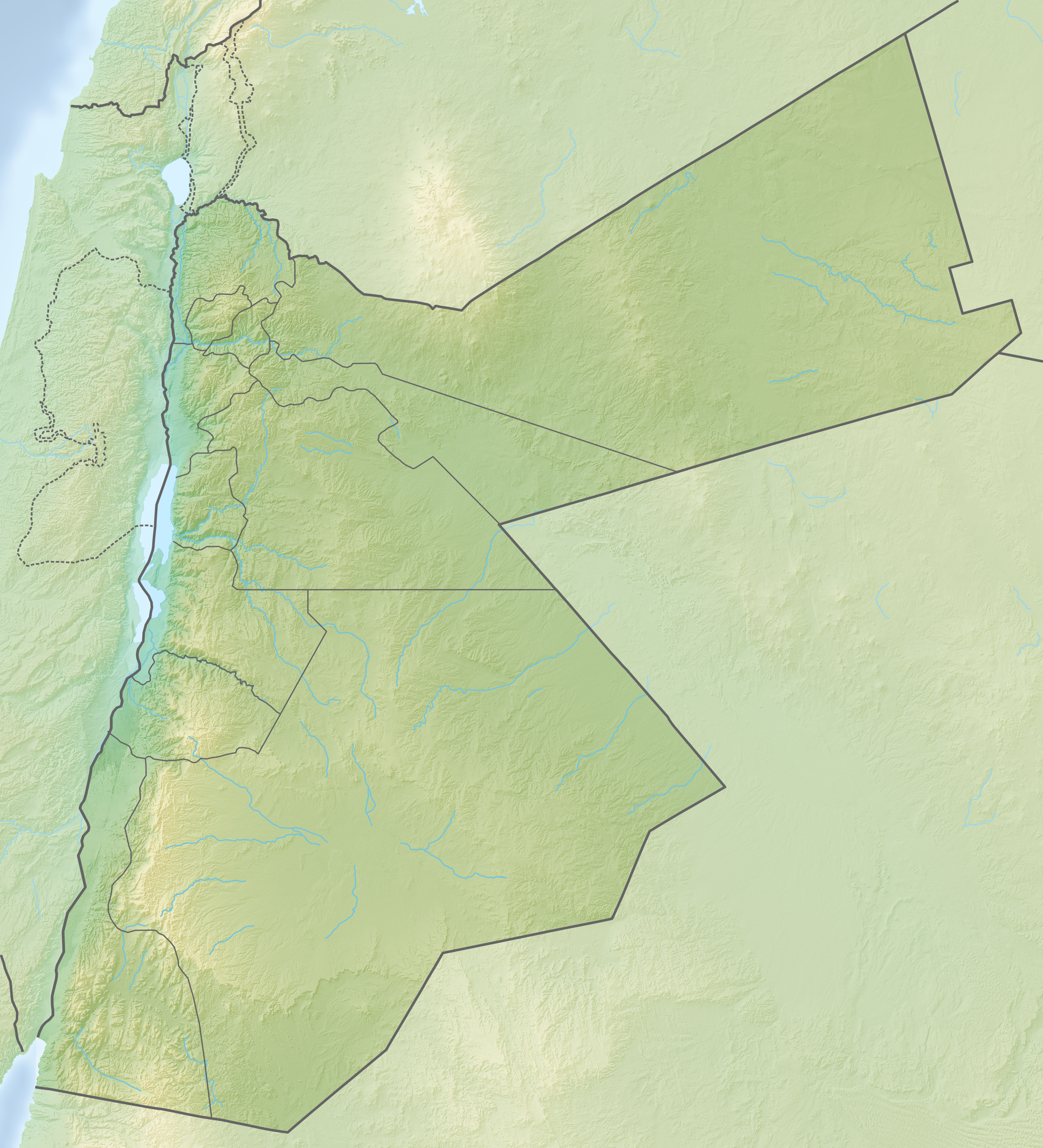
- Location in Jordan Location in Israel and Palestine
- Location: West Asia
- Coordinates: 31°30′N 35°30′E
- Lake type: Endorheic; Hypersaline
- Primary inflows: Jordan River
- Primary outflows: None
- Catchment area: 41,650 km^{2} (16,080 sq mi)
- Basin countries: Jordan, Palestine (Israeli-occupied West Bank), Israel
- Max. length: 50 km (31 mi) (northern basin only)
- Max. width: 15 km (9.3 mi)
- Surface area: 605 km^{2} (234 sq mi) (2016)
- Average depth: 188.4 m (618 ft)
- Max. depth: 298 m (978 ft) (elevation of deepest point, 728 m (2,388 ft) BSL [below sea level], minus current surface elevation)
- Water volume: 114 km^{3} (27 cu mi)
- Shore length^{1}: 135 km (84 mi)
- Surface elevation: −439.78 m (−1,443 ft) (2025)
- ^{1} Shore length is not a well-defined measure.

The Dead Sea (Arabic: اَلْبَحْر الْمَيِّت, romanized: al-Baḥr al-Mayyit; or اَلْبَحْر الْمَيْت, al-Baḥr al-Mayt; Hebrew: יַם הַמֶּלַח, romanized: Yam hamMelaḥ), also known by other names, is a landlocked salt lake bordered by Jordan to the east, the West Bank to the west and Israel to the southwest. It lies in the endorheic basin of the Jordan Rift Valley, and its main tributary is the Jordan River.

As of 2025, the lake's surface is 439.78 metres (1,443 ft) below sea level, making its shores the lowest land-based elevation on Earth. It is 304 m (997 ft) deep, which makes it the deepest hypersaline lake in the world. With a salinity of 342 g/kg, or 34.2% (in 2011), it is one of the world's saltiest bodies of water, 9.6 times as salty as the ocean—and has a density of 1.24 kg/L, which makes swimming similar to floating. This salinity makes for a harsh environment in which plants and animals cannot flourish, hence its name. The Dead Sea's main, northern basin is 50 kilometres (31 mi) long and 15 kilometres (9 mi) wide at its widest point.

The Dead Sea has attracted visitors from around the Mediterranean basin for thousands of years. It was one of the world's first health resorts, and it has been the supplier of a wide variety of products, from asphalt for Egyptian mummification to potash for fertilisers. Today, tourists visit the sea on its Israeli, Jordanian and West Bank coastlines.

The Dead Sea is receding at a swift rate; its surface area today is 605 km^{2} (234 sq mi), having been 1,050 km^{2} (410 sq mi) in 1930. Multiple canal and pipeline proposals, such as the scrapped Red Sea–Dead Sea Water Conveyance project, have been made to reduce its recession.

== Names ==
The English name "Dead Sea" is a calque of the Arabic name, itself a calque of earlier Greek and Latin names, in reference to the scarcity of aquatic life caused by the lake's extreme salinity. Historical English names include the Salt Sea, Lake of Sodom from the biblical account of its destruction and Lake Asphaltites from Greek and Latin.

The name "Dead Sea" occasionally appears in Hebrew literature as Yām HamMāvet (ים המוות), 'Sea of Death'. However, the most common name for the lake in both biblical and modern Hebrew—and also its oldest known name—is the 'Sea of Salt' (Hebrew: ים המלח, romanized: Yām HamMelaḥ). Other Hebrew names for the lake also mentioned in the Bible are the Sea of Arabah (Hebrew: ים הערבה, romanized: Yām Ha'Ărāvâ) and the Eastern Sea (Hebrew: היםהקדמוני, romanized: HaYām HaQadmōnî). In the Talmud, it is called 'Sea of Salt' or 'Sea of Sodom'.

The Arabic name is al-Bahr al-Mayyit (البحر الميت), or usually without the article al-. It is also known in Arabic as the 'Sea of Lot' (Arabic: بحر لوط, romanized: baḥr Lūṭ, or بُحَيْرَة Buhayrat, بَحْرَة Bahret, or بِرْكَة لوط Birket Lūṭ) from the nephew of Abraham whose wife was said to have turned into a pillar of salt during the destruction of Sodom and Gomorrah. Less often, it has been known in Arabic as the Sea of Zoara (بَحْر صُوغَر) from a formerly important city along its shores.

Because of the large volume of ancient trade in the lake's naturally occurring free-floating bitumen, its usual names in ancient Greek and Roman geography were some form of Asphalt Lake (Ancient Greek: Ἀσφαλτίτης, romanized: Asphaltítēs; or no: Ἀσφαλτίτις Λίμνη, romanized: Asphaltítis Límnē; Latin: Lacus Asphaltites) or Asphalt Sea (Ἀσφαλτίτης Θάλασσα, Asphaltítēs Thálassa).

It was also known as the 'Dead Sea' (Ancient Greek: Νεκρά Θάλασσα, romanized: Nekrá Thálassa; Latin: Mare Mortuum). Another ancient name is the "Jewish Sea," (Latin: Iudaicum mare), a term used by the second-century Roman historian Tacitus.

== Geography ==
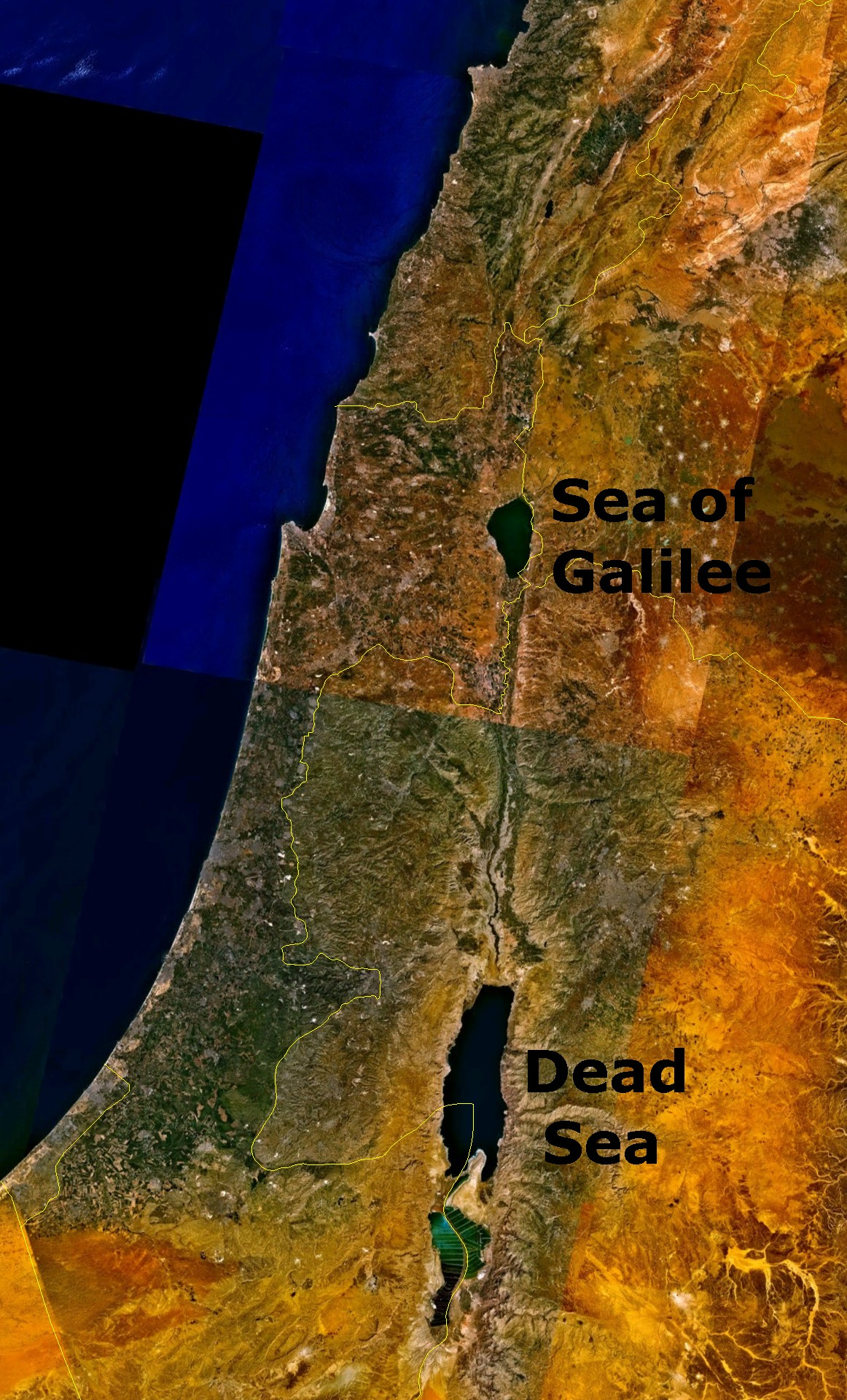
Satellite photograph, showing the location of the Dead Sea east of the Mediterranean Sea

The Dead Sea is a salt lake bordered by Jordan to the east and Palestine's Israeli-occupied West Bank and Israel to the west. It is an endorheic lake, meaning there are no outlet streams.

The Dead Sea lies in the Jordan Rift Valley, a geographic feature formed by the Dead Sea Transform (DST). This left lateral-moving transform fault lies along the tectonic plate boundary between the African Plate and the Arabian Plate. It runs between the East Anatolian Fault zone in Turkey and the northern end of the Red Sea Rift offshore of the southern tip of Sinai.

Water feeds into the Dead Sea from various sources, many small or intermittent, including:

- Jordan River, international border from the north
- Arava Stream (Wadi Arava), international border from the south
- Wadi Mujib (Arnon Stream), Jordan, Karak Governorate
- Wadi Darga (Wadi Darajeh, Nahal Darga, or Nahal Dragot), West Bank
- Wadi al-Hasa (Brook of Zered), Jordan, boundary between Karak Governorate and Tafilah Governorate
- Nahal Arugot (Wadi Areijeh or Wadi Argot), mouth at Ein Gedi, Israel
- Wadi Wala, Jordan side
- Wadi Zarqa Ma'in, Jordan side
- Nahal Tur, West Bank
- Nahal Og, West Bank
- Groundwater seepage
- Direct rainfall

(Wadi is the Arabic term for a river valley with a small or intermittent stream; Nahal is the equivalent in Hebrew. The two terms are often used interchangeably in English names for the same body of water.)

The water of Wadi Hassa is now completely consumed in Jordan. The Jordan River, which passes through the Sea of Galilee, has been substantially diverted. It currently only contributes about one-sixth of the inflow to the Dead Sea, less than direct rainfall.

There are also small perennial springs under and around the Dead Sea, forming pools and quicksand pits along the edges.

The Wadi Mujib valley, 420 m below the sea level in the southern part of the Jordan valley, is a biosphere reserve, with an area of 212 km^{2} (82 sq mi). Rainfall is scarcely 100 mm (4 in) per year in the northern part of the Dead Sea and barely 50 mm (2 in) in the southern part. The Dead Sea zone's aridity is due to the rainshadow effect of the Judaean Mountains. The highlands east of the Dead Sea receive more rainfall than the Dead Sea itself.

To the west of the Dead Sea, the Judaean mountains rise less steeply and are much lower than the mountains to the east. Along the southwestern side of the lake is a 210 m (700 ft) tall halite mineral formation called Mount Sodom.

== Geology ==
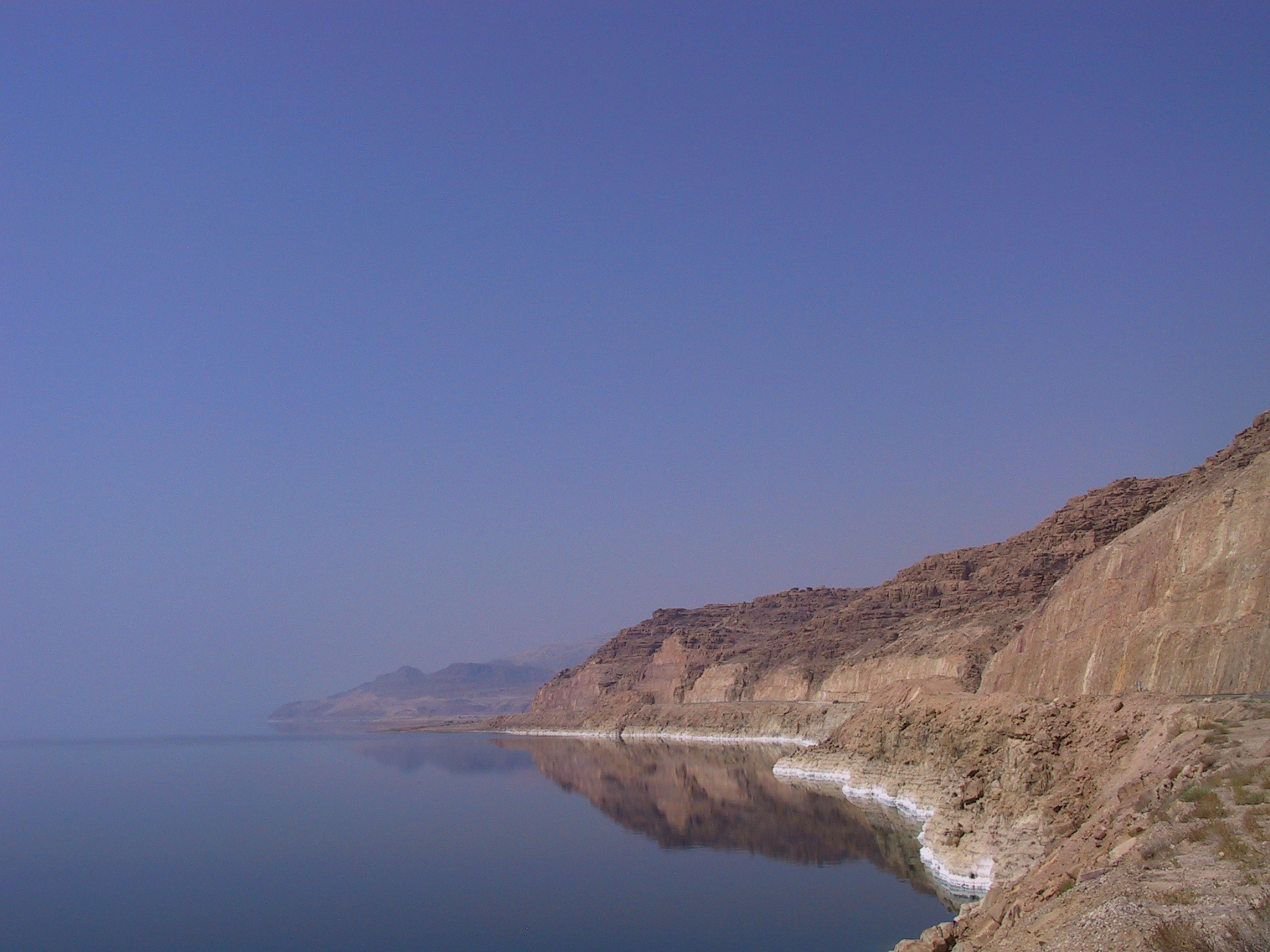
The Jordanian shore of the Dead Sea, showing salt deposits left behind by falling water levels

=== Formation theories ===
There are two contending hypotheses about the origin of the low elevation of the Dead Sea. The older hypothesis is that the Dead Sea lies in a true rift zone, an extension of the Red Sea Rift, or even of the Great Rift Valley of eastern Africa. A more recent hypothesis is that the Dead Sea basin is a consequence of a "step-over" discontinuity along the Dead Sea Transform, creating an extension of the crust with consequent subsidence.

=== Sedom Lagoon ===
During the late Pliocene-early Pleistocene, what is now the valley of the Jordan River, Dead Sea, and the northern Wadi Arabah was repeatedly inundated by waters from the Mediterranean Sea. The waters formed in a narrow, crooked bay that is called by geologists the Sedom Lagoon, which was connected to the sea through what is now the Jezreel Valley. The floods of the valley came and went depending on long-scale changes in the tectonic and climatic conditions.

The Sedom Lagoon extended at its maximum from the Sea of Galilee in the north to somewhere around 50 km (30 mi) south of the current southern end of the Dead Sea, and the subsequent lakes never surpassed this expanse. The Hula Depression was never part of any of these water bodies due to its higher elevation and the high threshold of the Korazim block separating it from the Sea of Galilee basin.

=== Salt deposits ===
The Sedom Lagoon deposited evaporites mainly consisting of rock salt, which eventually reached a thickness of 2.3 km (1.43 mi) on the old basin floor in the area of today's Mount Sedom.

=== Lake formation ===
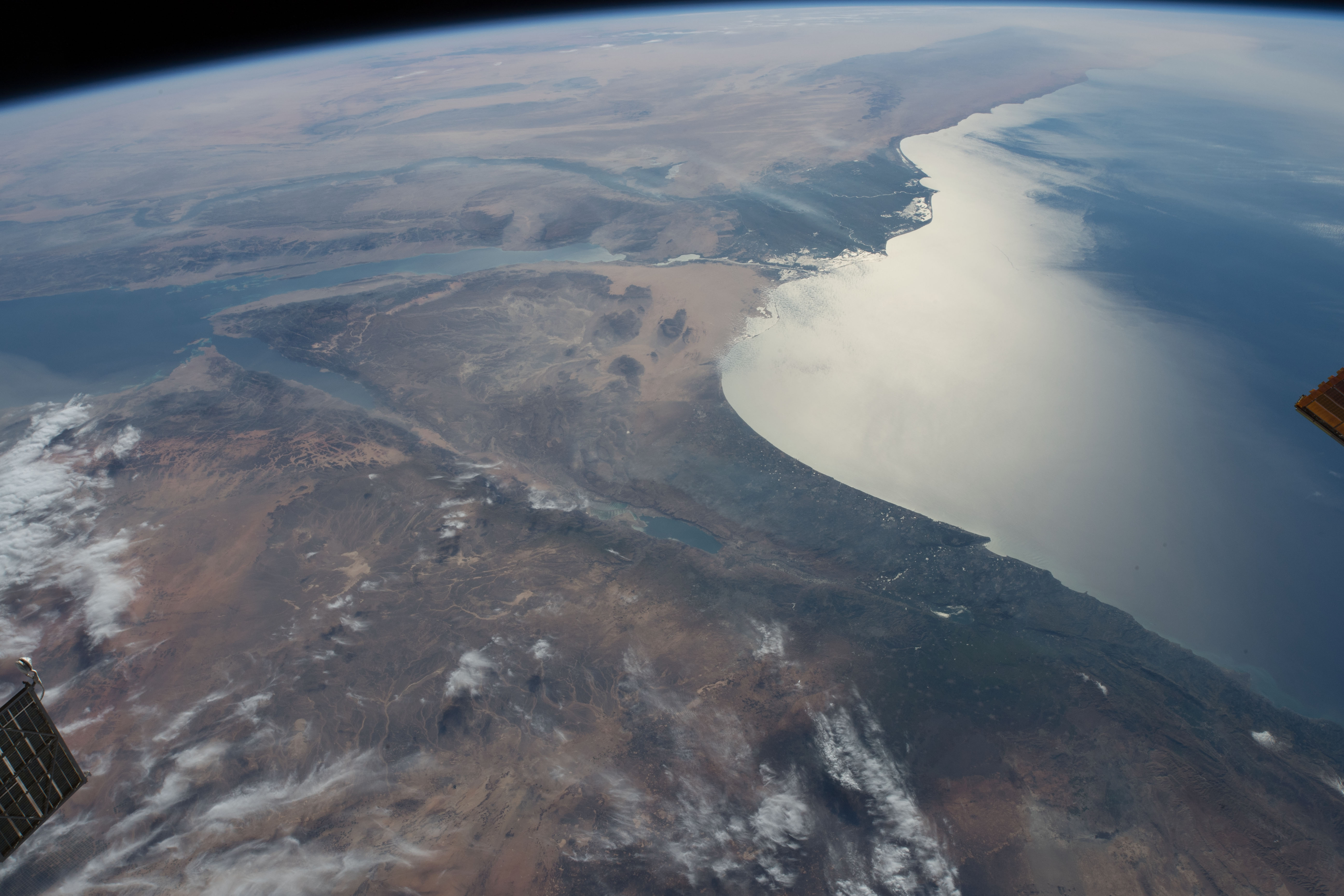
NASA photo showing depth of the Dead Sea basin (slightly below center). The Mediterranean Sea is on the right, with the Suez Canal visible connecting it to the Red Sea on left (slightly above center).

According to Kafri, during the late Neogene, i.e. in the Pliocene (ended c. 2.5 million years ago), the eustatic sea level was at 50–100 metres above the current sea level, thus flooding the northern valleys connecting the Mediterranean Sea with the Jordan Rift Valley, which led to the creation of a crooked-shaped lagoon. This high eustatic sea level situation subsequently came to an end, and the ocean could no longer flood the area. Thus, the long lagoon became a landlocked lake, which – due to the high evaporation rate – retreated toward the lower, southern part of the rift valley. However, Mordechai Stein considers the formation process as not yet clarified, speaking of a late Pliocene-early Pleistocene process in which tectonics might also have played a part in blocking water ingression from the Mediterranean to its former bay or lagoon.

The first prehistoric lake to follow the Sedom Lagoon is named Lake Amora (which possibly appeared in the early Pleistocene; its sediments developed into the Amora (Samra) Formation, dated to over 200–80 kyr BP), followed by Lake Lisan (c. 70–14 kyr) and finally by the Dead Sea.

=== Lake salinity ===
The water levels and salinity of the successive lakes (Amora, Lisan, Dead Sea) have either risen or fallen as an effect of the tectonic dropping of the valley bottom, and due to climate variation. As the climate became more arid, Lake Lisan finally shrank and became saltier, leaving the Dead Sea as its last remainder.

From 70,000 to 12,000 years ago, Lake Lisan's level was 100 to 250 m (330 to 820 ft) higher than its current level, possibly due to lower evaporation than in the present. Its level fluctuated dramatically, rising to its highest level around 26,000 years ago, indicating a very wet climate in West Asia. Around 10,000 years ago, the lake's level dropped dramatically, probably even lower than today. During the last several thousand years, the lake has fluctuated approximately 400 m (1,300 ft), with some significant drops and rises. Current theories as to the cause of this dramatic drop in levels rule out volcanic activity; therefore, it may have been a seismic event.

=== Salt mounts formation ===
In prehistoric times, great amounts of sediment collected on the floor of Lake Amora. The sediment was heavier than the salt deposits and squeezed the salt deposits upwards into what are now the Lisan Peninsula and Mount Sodom (on the southwest side of the lake). Geologists explain the effect in terms of a bucket of mud into which a large flat stone is placed, forcing the mud to creep up the sides of the bucket. When the floor of the Dead Sea dropped further due to tectonic forces, the salt mounts of Lisan and Mount Sodom stayed in place as high cliffs (see salt dome).

== Climate ==
The Dead Sea has a hot desert climate (Köppen climate classification BWh), with year-round sunny skies and dry air. It has less than 50 millimetres (2 in) mean annual rainfall and a summer average temperature between 32 and 39 °C (90 and 102 °F). Winter average temperatures range between 20 and 23 °C (68 and 73 °F). The region has weaker ultraviolet radiation, particularly the UVB (erythrogenic rays). Given the higher atmospheric pressure, the air has a slightly higher oxygen content (3.3% in summer to 4.8% in winter) as compared to oxygen concentration at sea level. Barometric pressures at the Dead Sea were measured between 1061 and 1065 hPa and clinically compared with health effects at higher altitude. (This barometric measure is about 5% higher than sea level standard atmospheric pressure of 1013.25 hPa, which is the global ocean mean or ATM.) The Dead Sea affects temperatures nearby because of the moderating effect a large body of water has on climate. During the winter, sea temperatures tend to be higher than land temperatures, and vice versa during the summer months. This is the result of the water's mass and specific heat capacity. On average, there are 192 days above 30 °C (86 °F) annually.

Climate data for Dead Sea, Sedom (390 m below sea level)
Month	Jan	Feb	Mar	Apr	May	Jun	Jul	Aug	Sep	Oct	Nov	Dec	Year
Record high °C (°F)	26.4 (79.5)	30.4 (86.7)	33.8 (92.8)	42.5 (108.5)	45.0 (113.0)	46.4 (115.5)	47.0 (116.6)	44.5 (112.1)	43.6 (110.5)	40.0 (104.0)	35.0 (95.0)	28.5 (83.3)	47.0 (116.6)
Mean daily maximum °C (°F)	20.5 (68.9)	21.7 (71.1)	24.8 (76.6)	29.9 (85.8)	34.1 (93.4)	37.6 (99.7)	39.7 (103.5)	39.0 (102.2)	36.5 (97.7)	32.4 (90.3)	26.9 (80.4)	21.7 (71.1)	30.4 (86.7)
Daily mean °C (°F)	16.6 (61.9)	17.7 (63.9)	20.8 (69.4)	25.4 (77.7)	29.4 (84.9)	32.6 (90.7)	34.7 (94.5)	34.5 (94.1)	32.4 (90.3)	28.6 (83.5)	23.1 (73.6)	17.9 (64.2)	26.1 (79.0)
Mean daily minimum °C (°F)	12.7 (54.9)	13.7 (56.7)	16.7 (62.1)	20.9 (69.6)	24.7 (76.5)	27.6 (81.7)	29.6 (85.3)	29.9 (85.8)	28.3 (82.9)	24.7 (76.5)	19.3 (66.7)	14.1 (57.4)	21.9 (71.4)
Record low °C (°F)	5.4 (41.7)	6.0 (42.8)	8.0 (46.4)	11.5 (52.7)	19.0 (66.2)	23.0 (73.4)	26.0 (78.8)	26.8 (80.2)	24.2 (75.6)	17.0 (62.6)	9.8 (49.6)	6.0 (42.8)	5.4 (41.7)
Average precipitation mm (inches)	7.8 (0.31)	9.0 (0.35)	7.6 (0.30)	4.3 (0.17)	0.2 (0.01)	0.0 (0.0)	0.0 (0.0)	0.0 (0.0)	0.0 (0.0)	1.2 (0.05)	3.5 (0.14)	8.3 (0.33)	41.9 (1.65)
Average precipitation days	3.3	3.5	2.5	1.3	0.2	0.0	0.0	0.0	0.0	0.4	1.6	2.8	15.6
Average relative humidity (%)	41	38	33	27	24	23	24	27	31	33	36	41	32
Source: Israel Meteorological Service

== Chemistry ==
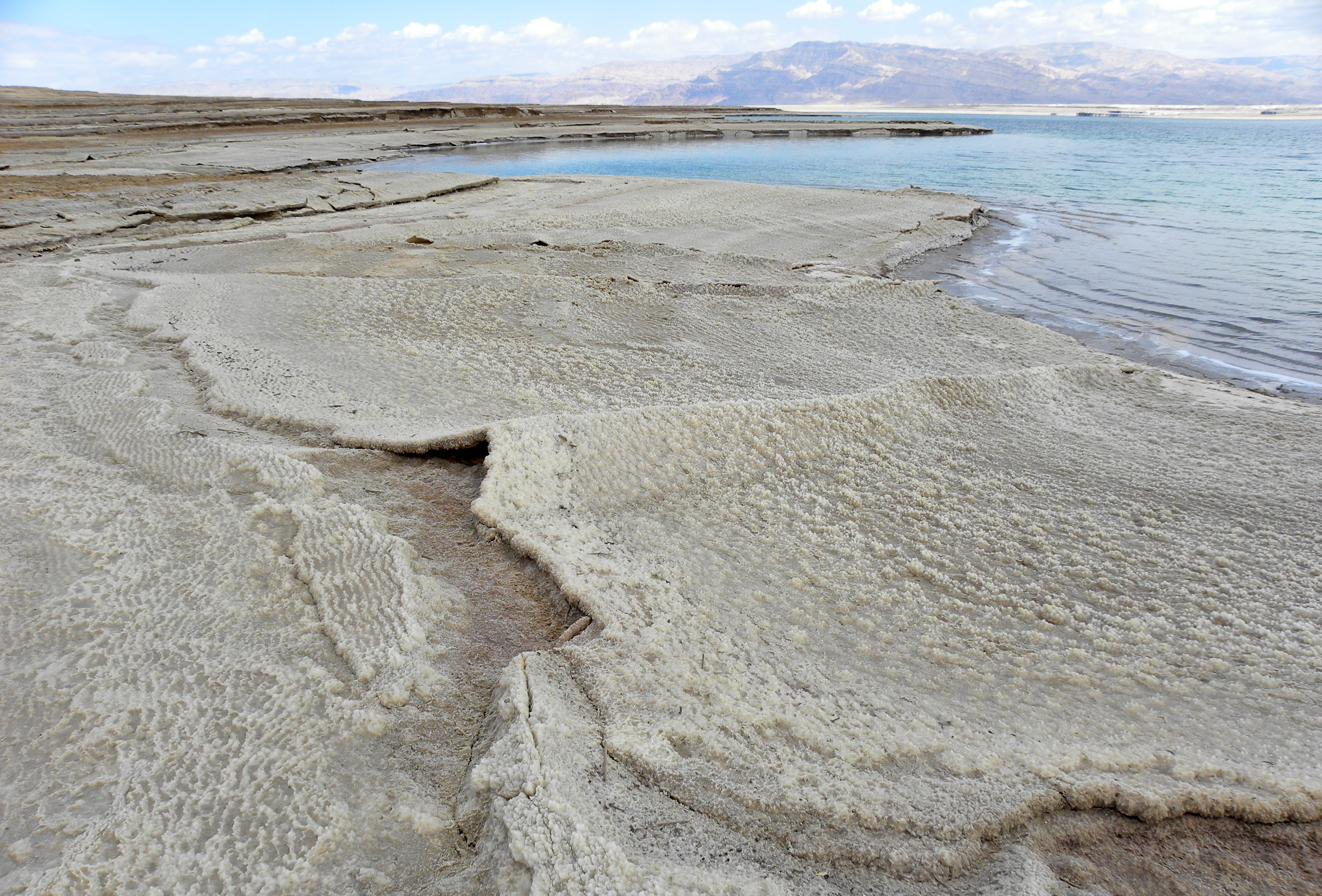
Halite deposits (and teepee structure) along the western Dead Sea coast

With 34.2% salinity (in 2011), the Dead Sea is one of the world's saltiest bodies of water, though Lake Vanda in Antarctica (35%), Lake Assal in Djibouti (34.8%), Lagoon Garabogazköl in the Caspian Sea (up to 35%) and some hypersaline ponds and lakes of the McMurdo Dry Valleys in Antarctica (such as Don Juan Pond (44%)) have reported higher salinities.

In the 19th century and the early 20th century, the surface layers of the Dead Sea were less salty than today, which resulted in an average density in the range of 1.15–1.17 g/cm^{3} instead of the present value of around 1.25 g/cm^{3}. A sample tested by Bernays in the 19th century had a salinity of 19%. By the year 1926, the salinity had increased (although it was also suspected that the salinity varies seasonally and depends on the distance from the mouth of the Jordan).

Until the winter of 1978–79, when a major mixing event took place, the Dead Sea was composed of two stratified layers of water that differed in temperature, density, age, and salinity. The topmost 35 meters (115 ft) or so of the Dead Sea had an average salinity of about 30%, and a temperature that swung between 19 and 37 °C (66 and 99 °F). Underneath a zone of transition, the lowest level of the Dead Sea had waters of a consistent 22 °C (72 °F) temperature, salinity of over 34%, and complete saturation of sodium chloride (NaCl). Since the water near the bottom is saturated with NaCl, that salt precipitates out of solution onto the sea floor.

Beginning in the 1960s, water inflow to the Dead Sea from the Jordan River was reduced as a result of large-scale irrigation and generally low rainfall. By 1975, the upper water layer was saltier than the lower layer. Nevertheless, the upper layer remained suspended above the lower layer because its waters were warmer and thus less dense. When the upper layer cooled so its density was greater than the lower layer, the waters mixed (1978–79). For the first time in centuries, the lake was a homogeneous body of water. Since then, stratification has begun to redevelop.

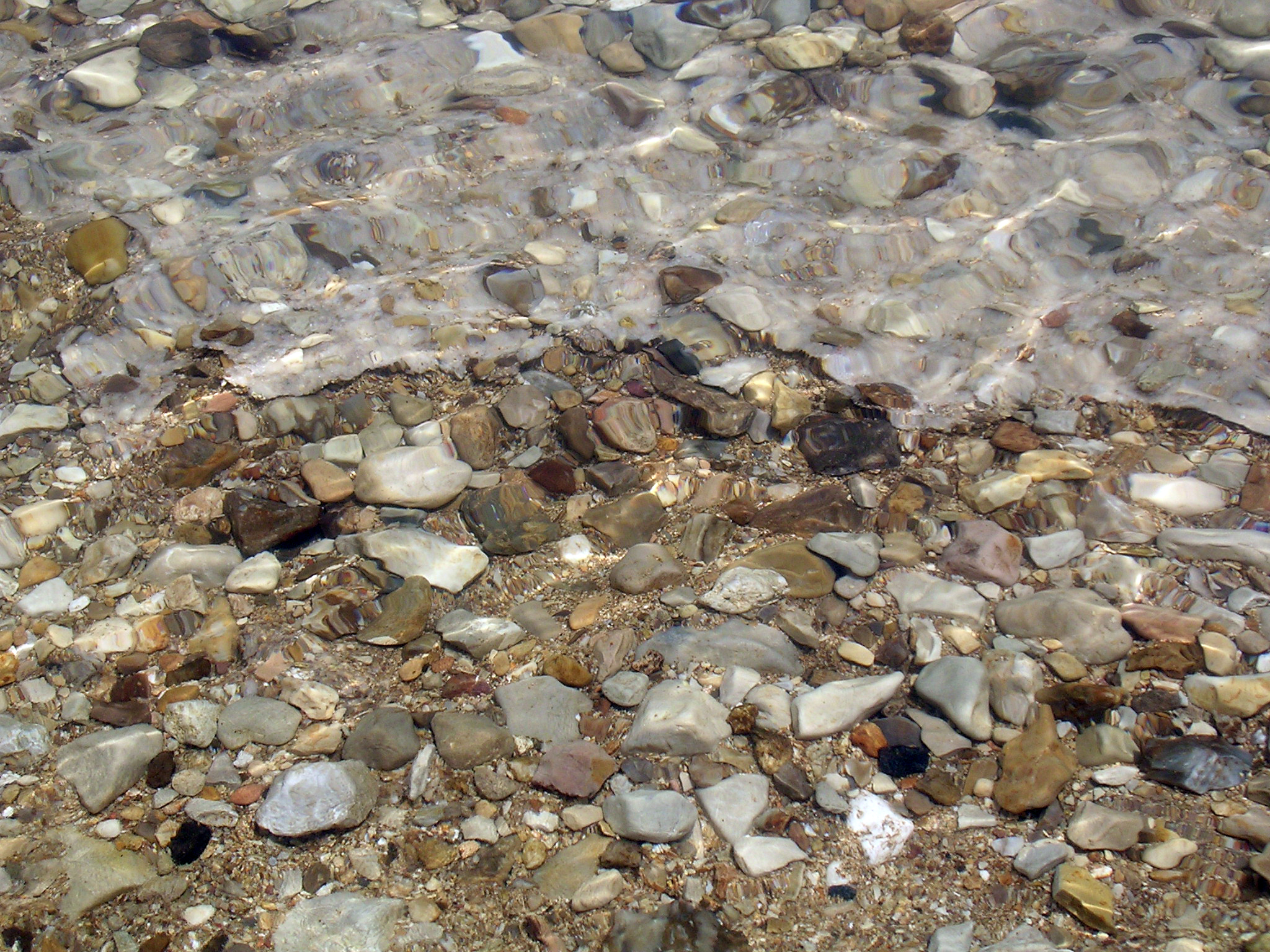
Pebbles cemented with halite on the western shore of the Dead Sea near Ein Gedi

The mineral content of the Dead Sea is very different from that of ocean water. The exact composition of the Dead Sea water varies mainly with season, depth and temperature. In the early 1980s, the concentration of ionic species (in g/kg) of Dead Sea surface water was Cl^{−} (181.4), Br^{−} (4.2), SO_{4}^{2−} (0.4), HCO_{3}^{−} (0.2), Ca^{2+} (14.1), Na^{+} (32.5), K^{+} (6.2) and Mg^{2+} (35.2). The total salinity was 276 g/kg. These results show that the composition of the salt, as anhydrous chlorides on a weight percentage basis, was calcium chloride (CaCl_{2}) 14.4%, potassium chloride (KCl) 4.4%, magnesium chloride (MgCl_{2}) 50.8% and sodium chloride (NaCl) 30.4%. In comparison, the salt in the water of most oceans and seas is approximately 85% sodium chloride. The concentration of sulfate ions (SO_{4}^{2−}) is very low, and the concentration of bromide ions (Br^{−}) is the highest of all waters on Earth.

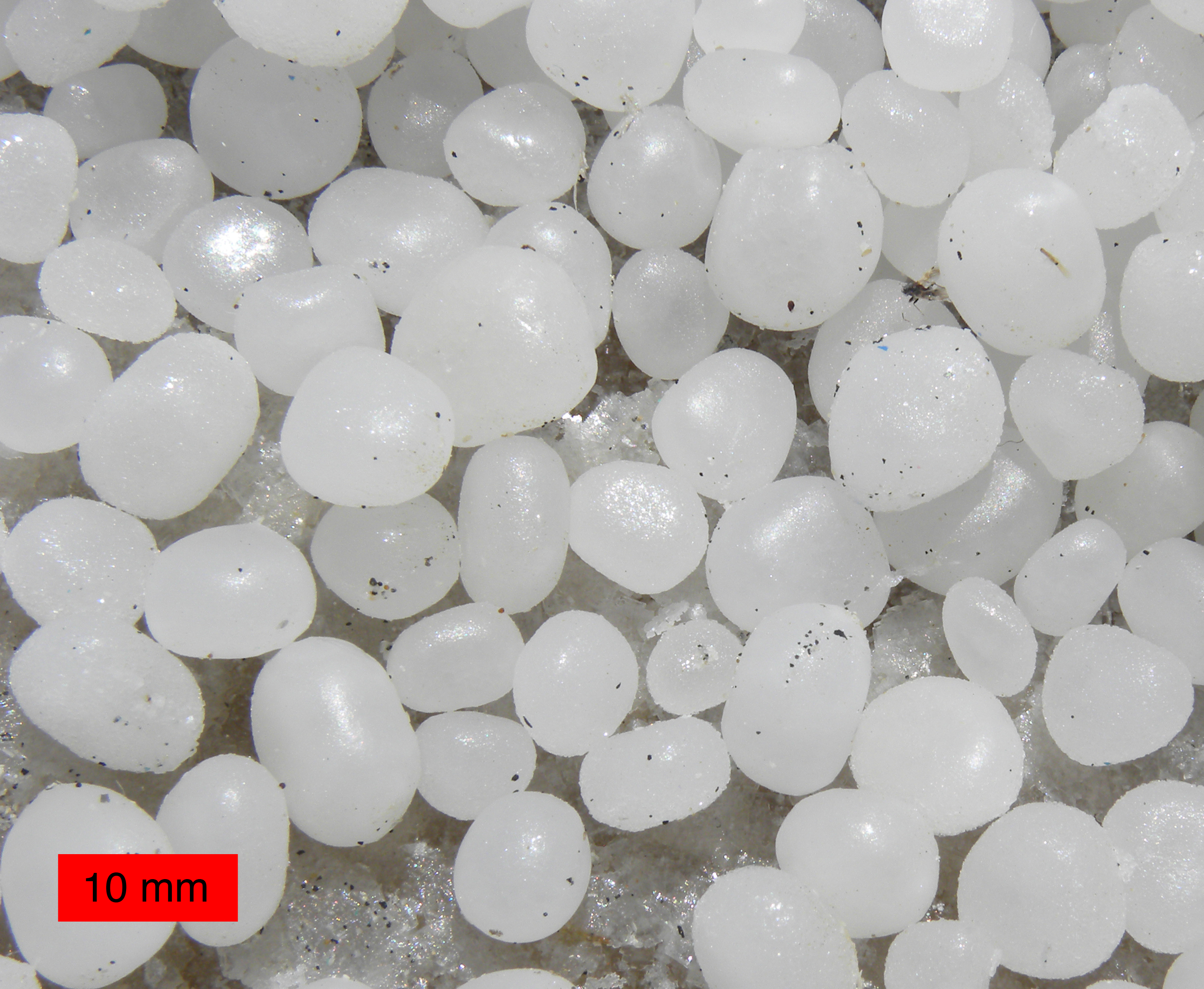
Beach pebbles made of halite; western coast

The salt concentration of the Dead Sea fluctuates around 31.5%. This is unusually high and results in a nominal density of 1.24 kg/L. Anyone can easily float in the Dead Sea because of natural buoyancy. In this respect the Dead Sea is similar to the Great Salt Lake in Utah in the United States.

An unusual feature of the Dead Sea is its discharge of asphalt. From deep seeps, the Dead Sea constantly spits up small pebbles and blocks of the black substance. Asphalt-coated figurines and bitumen-coated Neolithic skulls from archaeological sites have been found. Egyptian mummification processes used asphalt imported from the Dead Sea region.

== Putative therapies ==
The Dead Sea area has become a location for health research and potential treatment for several reasons. The mineral content of the water, the low content of pollens and other allergens in the atmosphere, the reduced ultraviolet component of solar radiation, and the higher atmospheric pressure at this great depth each may have specific health effects. For example, persons experiencing reduced respiratory function from diseases such as cystic fibrosis seem to benefit from the increased atmospheric pressure.

The region's climate and low elevation have made it a popular center for assessment of putative therapies:

- Climatotherapy: Treatment which exploits local climatic features such as temperature, humidity, sunshine, barometric pressure and special atmospheric constituents
- Heliotherapy: Treatment that exploits the biological effects of the sun's radiation
- Thalassotherapy: Treatment that exploits bathing in Dead Sea water

There is evidence that the unique attenuation and spectrum of UV rays near the Dead Sea contribute to effective photoclimatherapy for psoriasis, in part because the reduced exposure to solar radiation allows for longer periods of sunbathing.

Rhinosinusitis patients receiving Dead Sea saline nasal irrigation exhibited improved symptom relief compared to standard hypertonic saline spray in one study.

Dead Sea mud pack therapy has been suggested to temporarily relieve pain in patients with osteoarthritis of the knees. According to researchers of the Ben Gurion University of the Negev, treatment with mineral-rich mud compresses can be used to augment conventional medical therapy.

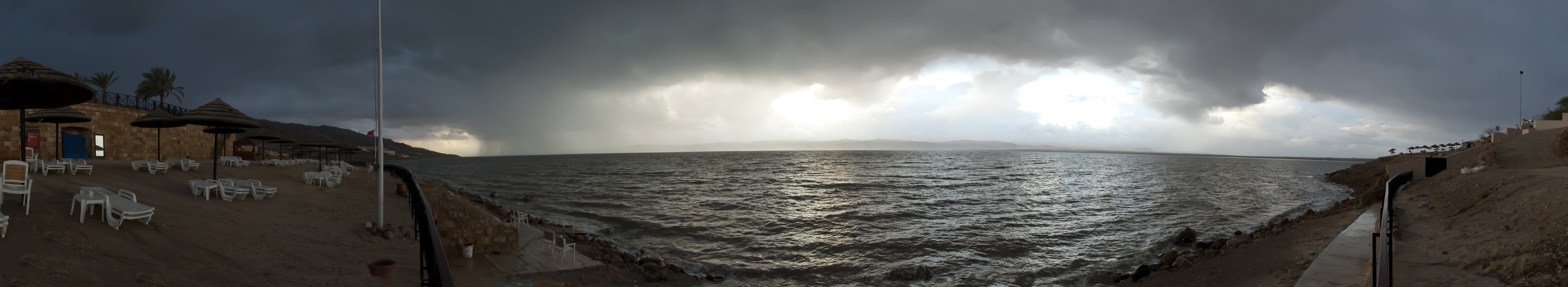
Panorama of the Dead Sea from the Mövenpick Resort, Jordan

== Life forms ==
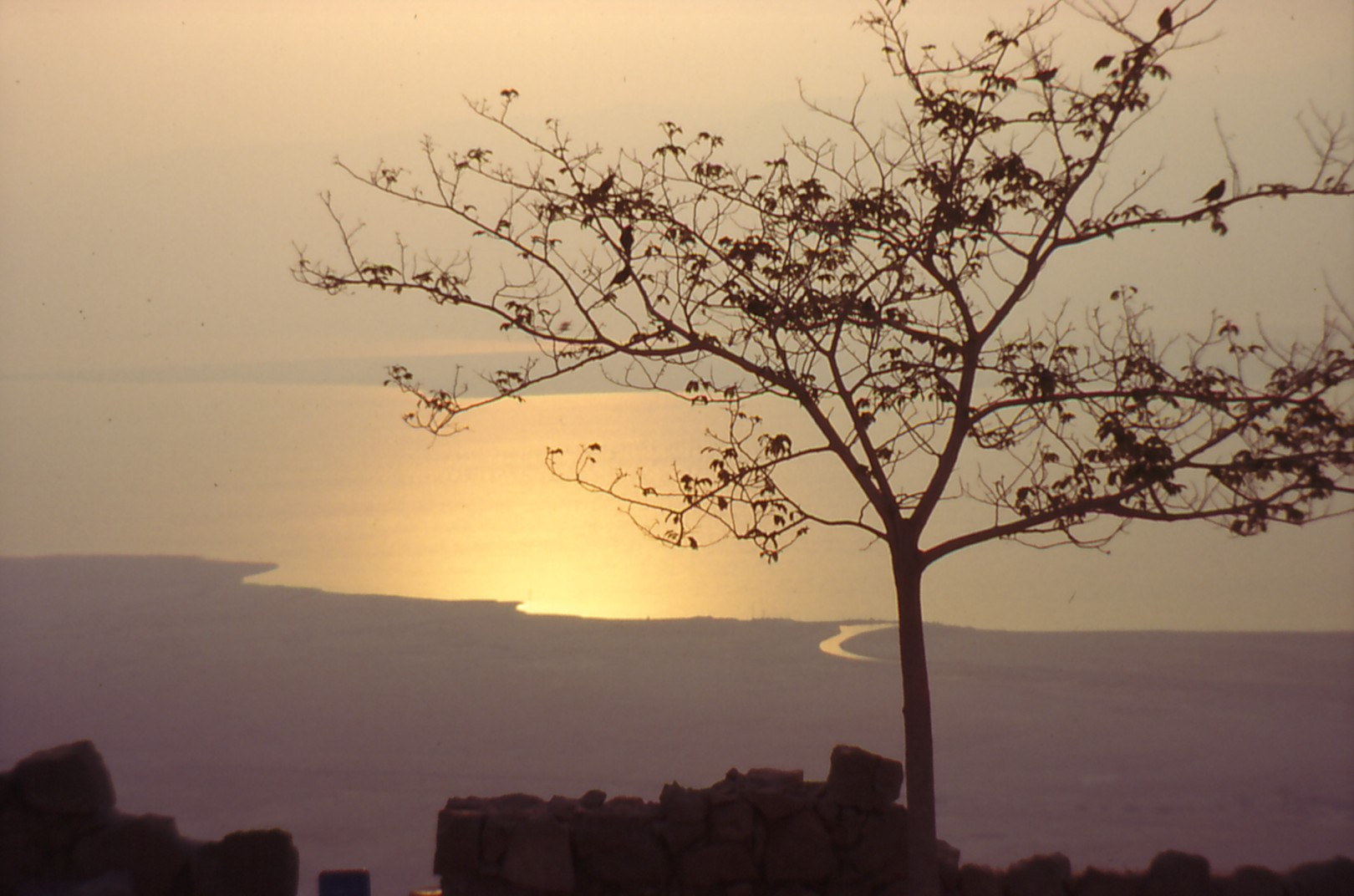
Dead Sea in the morning, seen from Masada

The sea is called "dead" because its high salinity prevents macroscopic aquatic organisms, such as fish and aquatic plants, from living in it, though minuscule quantities of bacteria and microbial fungi are present.

In times of flood, the salt content of the Dead Sea can drop from its usual 35% to 30% or lower. It temporarily comes to life in the wake of rainy winters. In 1980, after one such rainy winter, the normally dark blue Dead Sea turned red. Researchers from Hebrew University of Jerusalem found it to be teeming with an alga called Dunaliella. Dunaliella in turn nourished carotenoid-containing (red-pigmented) halobacteria, whose presence caused the color change. Since 1980, the basin has been dry and the algae and the bacteria have not returned in measurable numbers.

In 2011 a group of scientists from Be'er Sheva, Israel and Germany discovered fissures in the floor of the Dead Sea by scuba diving and observing the surface. These fissures allow fresh and brackish water to enter. They sampled biofilms surrounding the fissures and discovered numerous species of bacteria and archaea.

== Human settlement ==
There are several small communities near the Dead Sea. These include Ein Gedi, Neve Zohar and the Israeli settlements in the Megilot Regional Council: Kalya, Mitzpe Shalem and Avnat. There is a nature preserve at Ein Gedi, and several Dead Sea hotels are located on the southwest end at Ein Bokek near Neve Zohar. Highway 90 runs north–south on the Israeli side for a total distance of 565 km (351 mi) from Metula on the Lebanese border in the north to its southern terminus at the Egyptian border near the Red Sea port of Eilat.

Potash City is a small community on the Jordanian side of the Dead Sea, and others including Suweima. Highway 65 runs north–south on the Jordanian side from near Jordan's northern tip down past the Dead Sea to the port of Aqaba.

== Human history ==
=== Biblical period ===
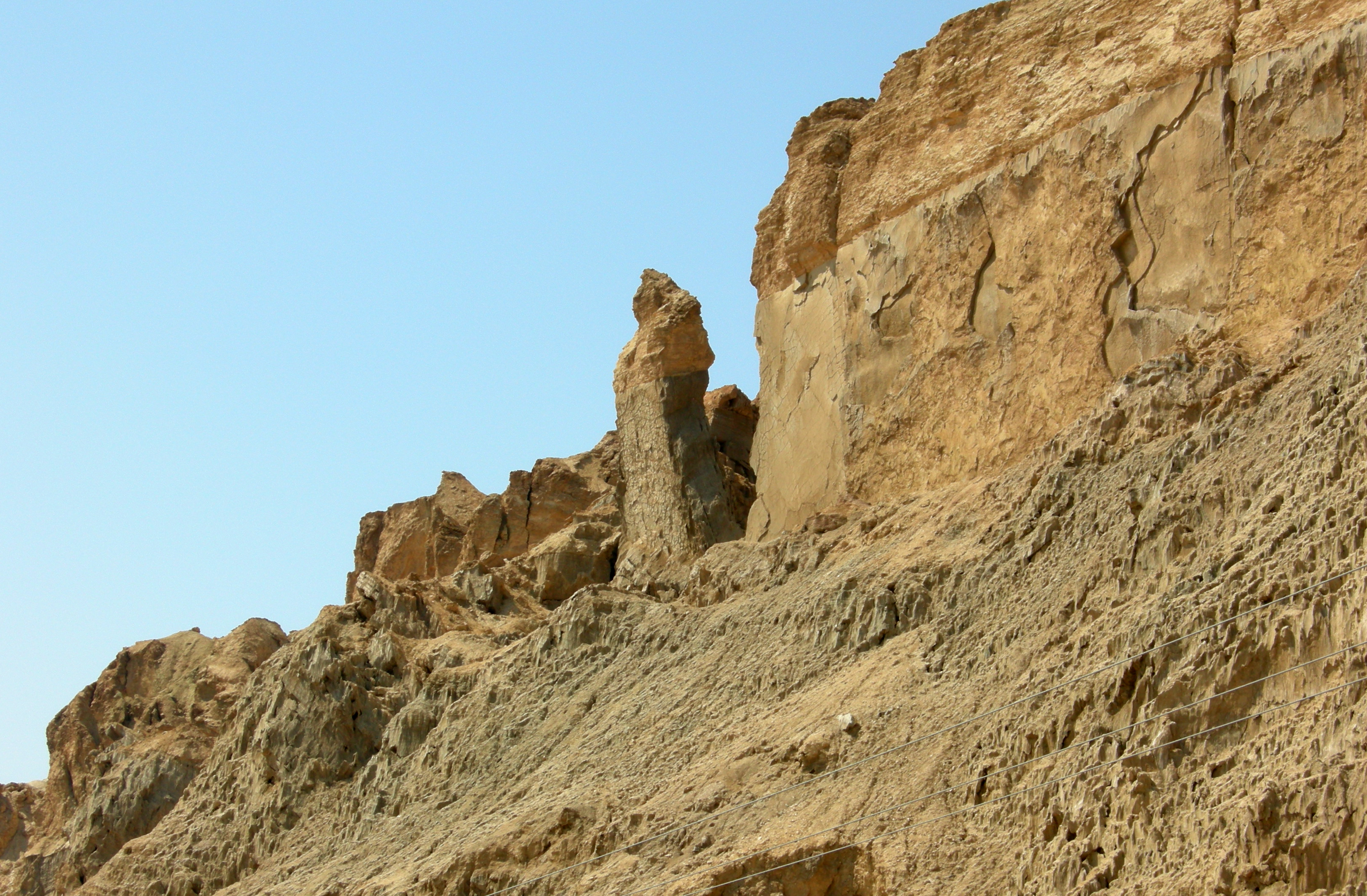
Mount Sodom, Israel, showing the so-called "Lot's Wife" pillar (made of halite like the rest of the mountain)

Dwelling in caves near the Dead Sea is recorded in the Hebrew Bible as having taken place before the Israelites came to Canaan, and extensively at the time of King David.

Just northwest of the Dead Sea is Jericho. Somewhere, perhaps on the southeastern shore, would be the cities mentioned in the Book of Genesis which were said to have been destroyed in the time of Abraham: Sodom and Gomorrah (Genesis 18) and the three other "Cities of the Plain", Admah, Zeboim and Zoar (Deuteronomy 29:23). Zoar escaped destruction when Abraham's nephew Lot escaped to Zoar from Sodom (Genesis 19:21–22). Before the destruction, the Dead Sea was a valley full of natural tar pits, which was called the vale of Siddim. King David was said to have hidden from Saul at Ein Gedi nearby.

In Ezekiel 47:8–9 there is a specific prophecy that the sea will "be healed and made fresh", becoming a normal lake capable of supporting marine life. A similar prophecy is stated in Zechariah 14:8, which says that "living waters will go out from Jerusalem, half of them to the eastern sea [likely the Dead Sea] and half to the western sea [the Mediterranean]."

During the First Temple period, the kingdom of Judah ruled the western shore of the Dead Sea, while Moab controlled the eastern shore. To the south were the Edomites. Judah established several fortresses along its side of the sea. Development in this area was likely driven by new economic opportunities arising from the Dead Sea's natural resources, including salt, bitumen, as well as cash crops. Both Ein Gedi and Jericho on Judah's side were vital centers for cultivating the highly prized Judean date palms during this time. Ein Gedi thrived as a major economic hub in the final century of Judah, before its destruction on the eve of the Babylonian captivity.

=== Hellenistic and Roman period ===
Greek and Jewish writers report that the Nabateans had monopolistic control over the Dead Sea.

Again if, as is fabled, there is a lake in Palestine, such that if you bind a man or beast and throw it in it floats and does not sink, this would bear out what we have said. They say that this lake is so bitter and salty that no fish live in it and that if you soak clothes in it and shake them it cleans them. — Aristotle, Meteorology

Archaeological evidence shows multiple anchorages existing on both sides of the sea, including in Ein Gedi, Khirbet Mazin (where the ruins of a Hasmonean-era dry dock are located), Numeira and near Masada. Josephus identified the Dead Sea in geographic proximity to the ancient Biblical city of Sodom. However, he referred to the lake by its Greek name, Asphaltites.

Herod the Great, king of Judaea, built or rebuilt several fortresses and palaces along the western shore of the Dead Sea, with Masada being the most famous. Another historically important fortress was Machaerus (מכוור), on the eastern bank, where, according to Josephus, John the Baptist was imprisoned by Herod Antipas and died.

During the Hellenistic and Roman periods, some Essenes, an ascetic Jewish sect, settled along the western shore of the Dead Sea. Roman historian Pliny the Elder identifies their location with the words, "on the west side of the Dead Sea, away from the coast... [above] the town of Engeda" (Natural History, Bk 5.73). Based on this, It is widely accepted, though still debated, that the Jewish community at Qumran was part of the Essene sect, and that the "Dead Sea Scrolls" discovered in nearby caves during the 20th century were their library.

The Dead Sea region was active during the First Jewish–Roman War (66–73 CE). Early in the conflict, a group of Sicarii, a radical Jewish sect, seized control of the fortress of Masada and killed the Roman garrison stationed there. After their leader was killed in Jerusalem, the Sicarii fled to Masada and took refuge in the fortress. In 68 CE, Roman commander Vespasian, tasked with suppressing the Jewish revolt, arrived at the Dead Sea and tested its buoyancy by throwing bound, non-swimmer captives into the water. Archaeological evidence suggests that around this time, the Qumran community was destroyed. The Sicarii at Masada continued to resist the Romans after the destruction of the Second Temple in 70 CE, holding out until 73/74 CE, when a siege by the Roman Legio X Fretensis resulted in the deaths of 960 inhabitants by suicide, according to Josephus. The Roman camps surrounding Masada were constructed by Jewish slaves who received water from nearby towns, which were supplied with drinking water from the Ein Feshcha springs and other nearby sweetwater sources.

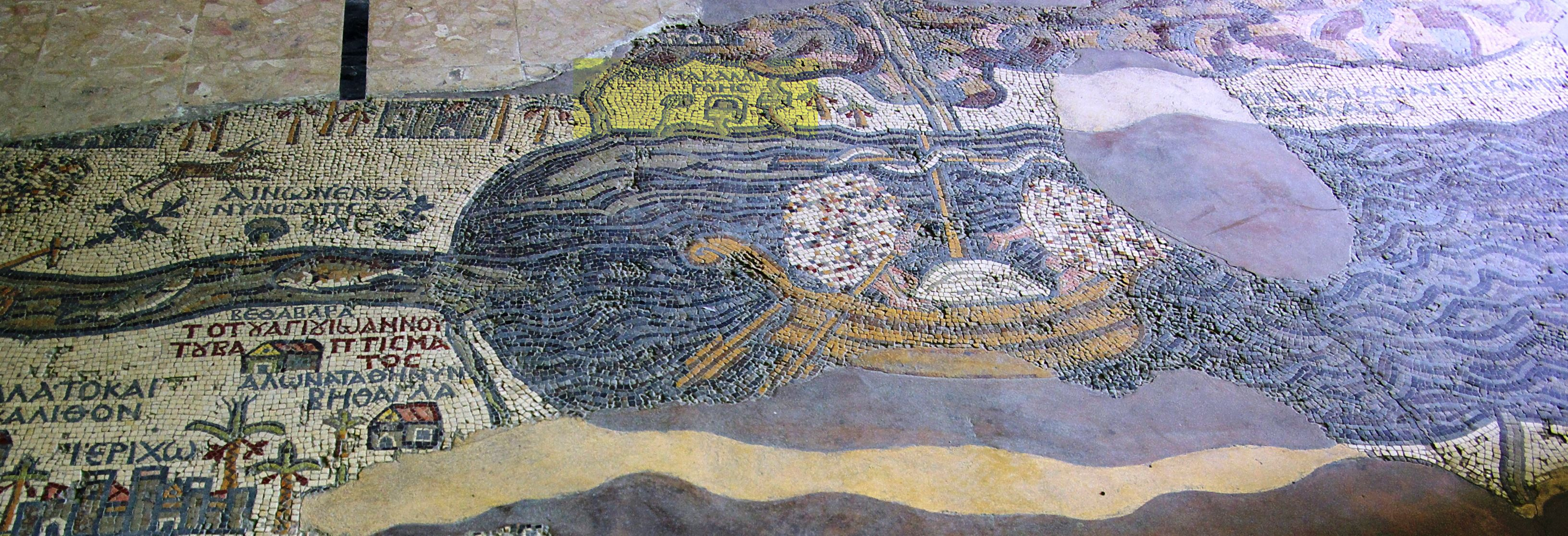
A cargo boat on the Dead Sea as seen on the Madaba Map, from the 6th century AD

The town of Ein Gedi, mentioned many times in the Mishna, produced persimmon for the temple's fragrance and for export, using a secret recipe. "Sodomite salt" was an essential mineral for the temple's holy incense, but was said to be dangerous for home use and could cause blindness.

=== Byzantine period ===
The sixth-century mosaic known as the Madaba Map indicates that trade across the Dead Sea was very prevalent during the Byzantine period.

Connected with the Judean wilderness to its northwest and west, the Dead Sea was a place of escape and refuge. The remoteness of the region attracted Greek Orthodox monks since the Byzantine era. Their monasteries, such as Saint George in Wadi Kelt and Mar Saba in the Judaean Desert, are places of pilgrimage.

The Jewish village of Ein Gedi, which had been continuously inhabited since the 5th century BCE, was destroyed in the 7th century by a devastating fire.

=== Medieval period ===
From the seventh century onwards, the Dead Sea area entered a period of decline and its population decreased. The cultivation of sugarcane near the northern and southern shores of the lake began to develop during the Crusader period and reached its peak under the Mamluks.

=== Modern times ===
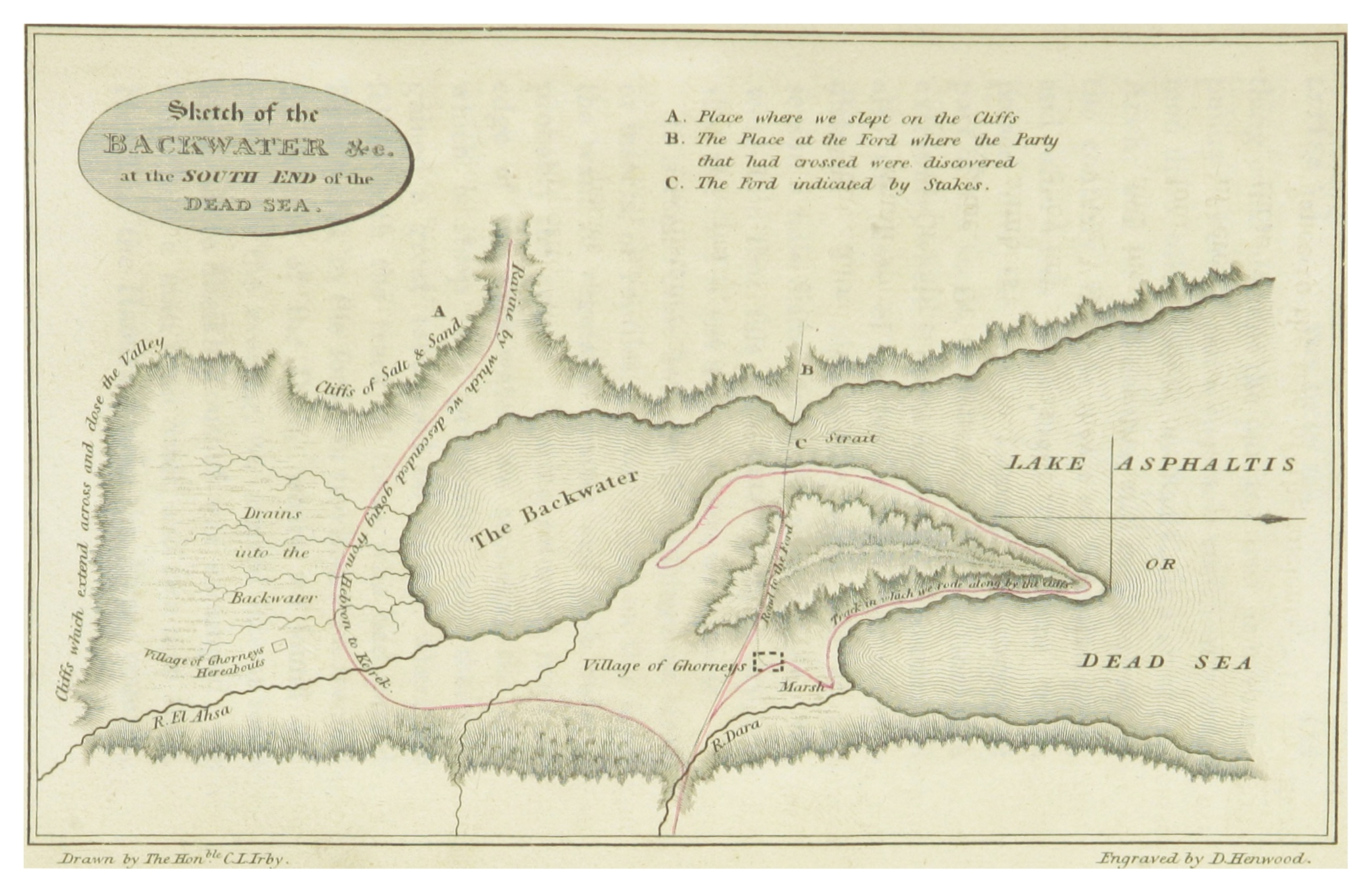
The southern basin of the Dead Sea as of 1817–18, with the Lisan Peninsula and its ford (now named Lynch Strait). North is to the right.

In the 19th century the River Jordan and the Dead Sea were explored by boat primarily by Christopher Costigan in 1835, Thomas Howard Molyneux in 1847, William Francis Lynch in 1848, and John MacGregor in 1869. The full text of W. F. Lynch's 1849 book Narrative of the United States' Expedition to the River Jordan and the Dead Sea is available online. Charles Leonard Irby and James Mangles travelled along the shores of the Dead Sea already in 1817–18, but didn't navigate on its waters.

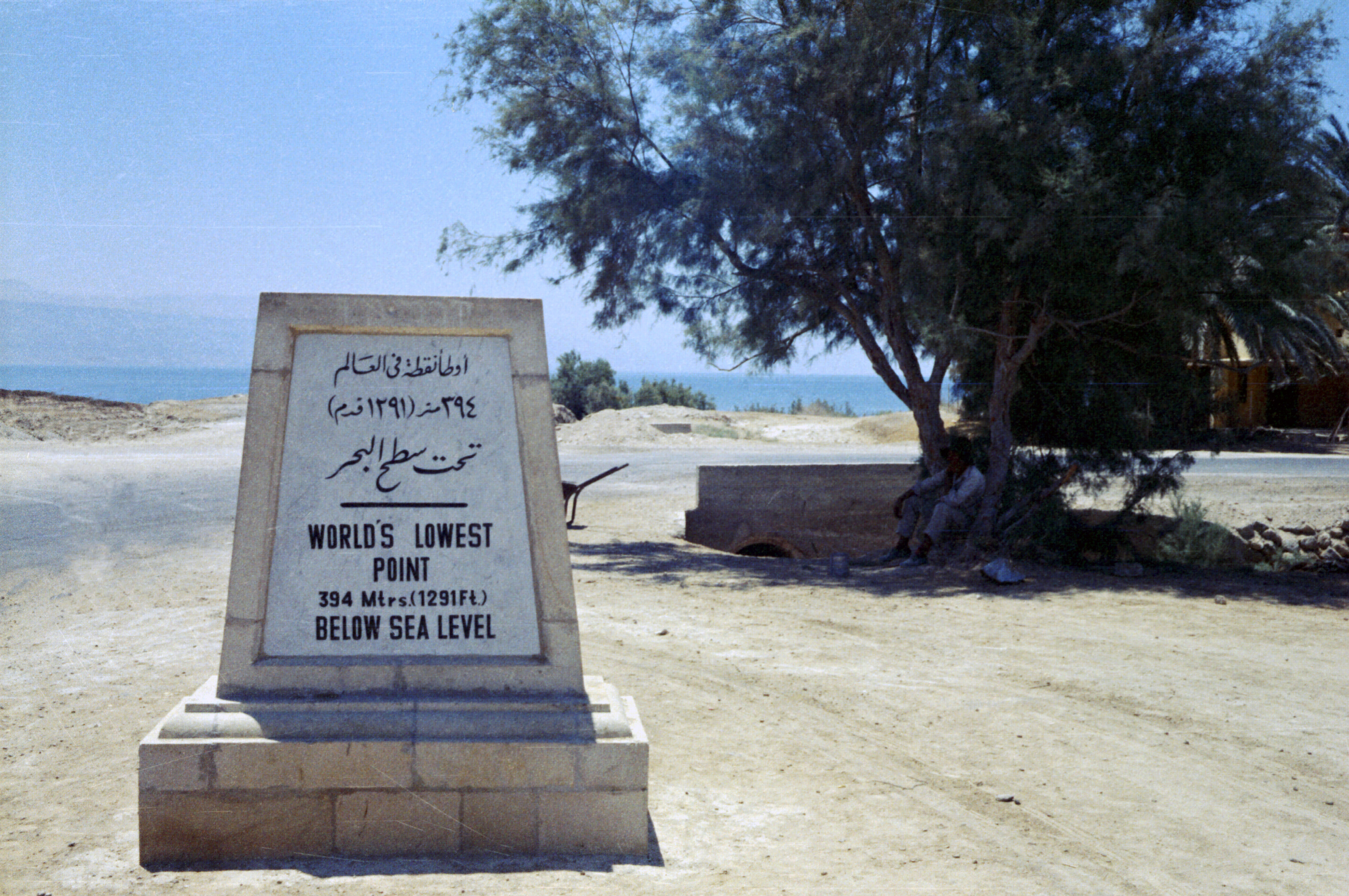
World's lowest (dry) point, Jordan, 1971

Explorers and scientists arrived in the area to analyze the minerals and research the unique climate.

After the find of the "Moabite Stone" in 1868 on the plateau east of the Dead Sea, Moses Wilhelm Shapira and his partner Salim al-Khouri forged and sold a whole range of presumed "Moabite" antiquities, and in 1883 Shapira presented what is now known as the "Shapira Strips", a supposedly ancient scroll written on leather strips which he claimed had been found near the Dead Sea. The strips were declared to be forgeries and Shapira took his own life in disgrace.

The 1922 census of Palestine lists 100 people (68 Muslims and 32 Christians) with "Dead Sea & Jordan" as their main locality. The 1931 census shows a sharp increase with 535 people (264 Muslims, 230 Jews, 21 Christians, 17 Druze, and three with no religion) listing "Dead Sea" as their main village/town. The 1938 nor 1945 village statistics does not give a number for the general Dead Sea area.

In the late 1940s and early 1950s, hundreds of Jewish religious documents dated between 150 BCE and 70 CE were found in caves near the ancient settlement of Qumran, about one mile (1.6 kilometres) inland from the northwestern shore of the Dead Sea (presently in the West Bank). They became known and famous as the Dead Sea Scrolls.

The world's lowest roads, Highway 90, run along the Israeli and West Bank shores of the Dead Sea, along with Highway 65 on the Jordanian side, at 393 m (1,289 ft) below sea level.

== Tourism and leisure ==
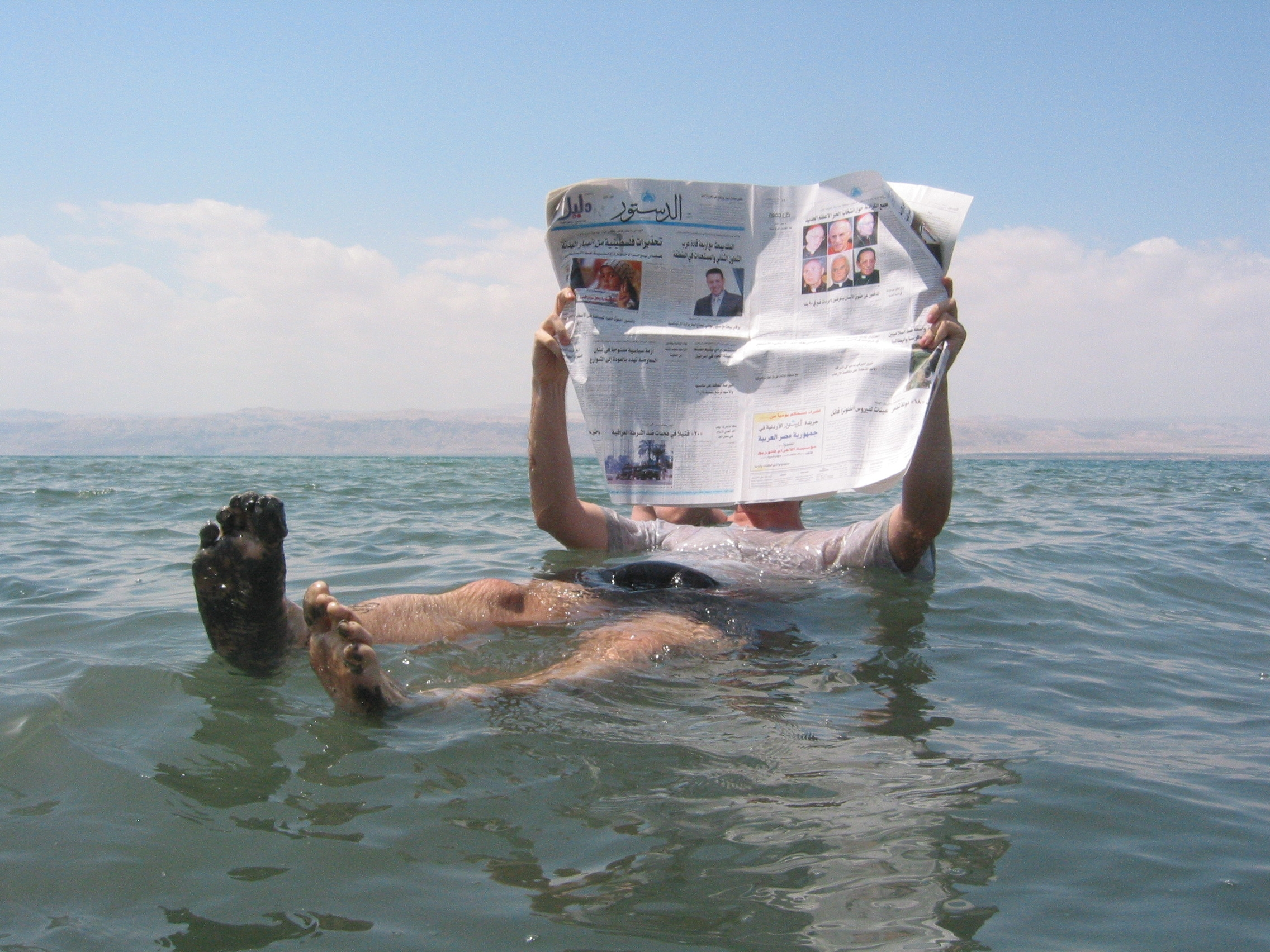
A person floating because of the highly saline water, with no need to swim to stay afloat reading a newspaper in the water is popular tourist photo setup

=== British Mandate period ===
A golf course named for Sodom and Gomorrah was built by the British at Kalia on the northern shore.

=== Israel ===
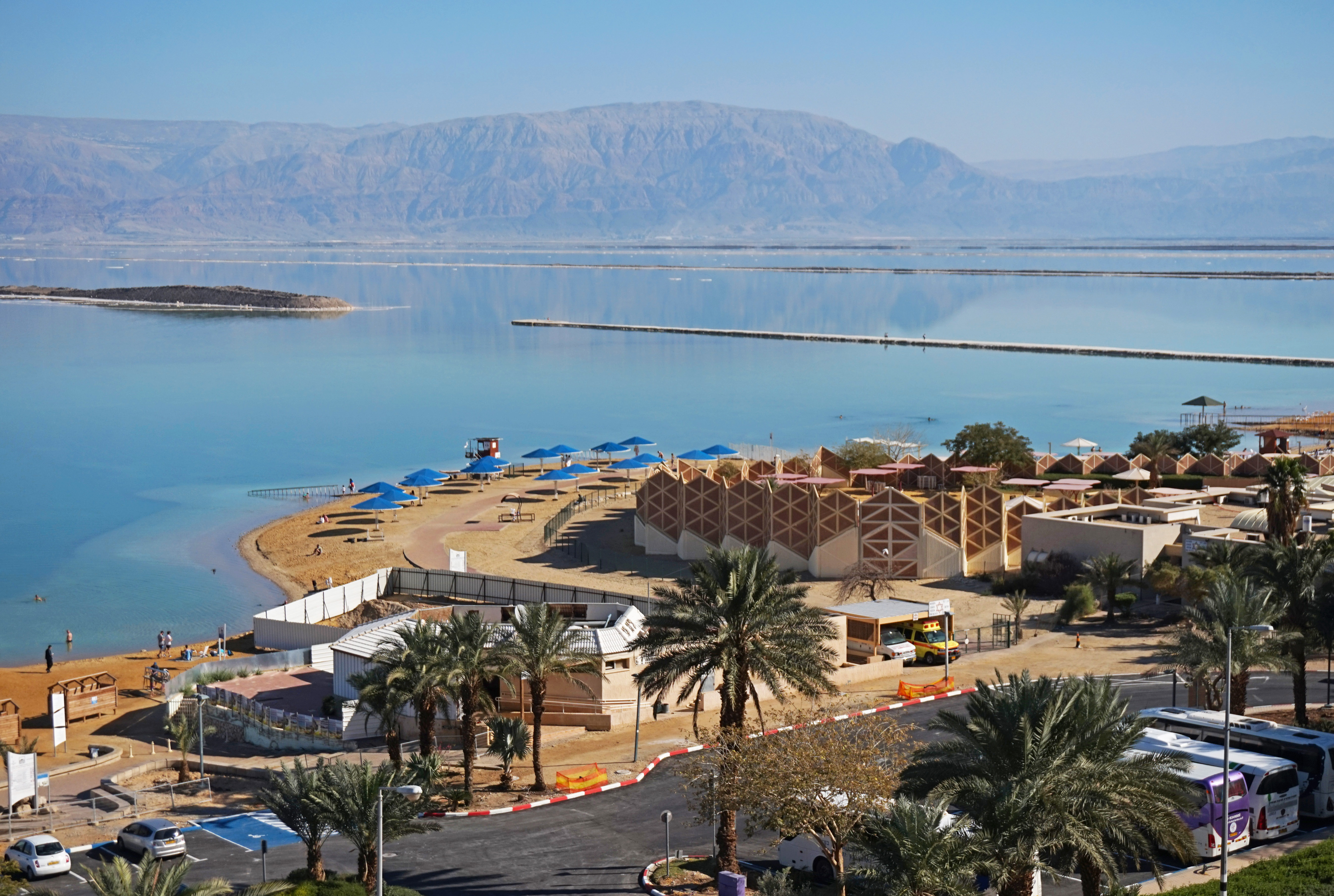
Ein Bokek, a resort on the Israeli shore

The first major Israeli hotels were built in nearby Arad, and since the 1960s at the Ein Bokek resort complex.

Israel has 15 hotels along the Dead Sea shore, generating total revenues of $291 million in 2012. Most Israeli hotels and resorts on the Dead Sea are on a six-kilometre (3.7-mile) stretch of the southern shore.

=== Jordan ===
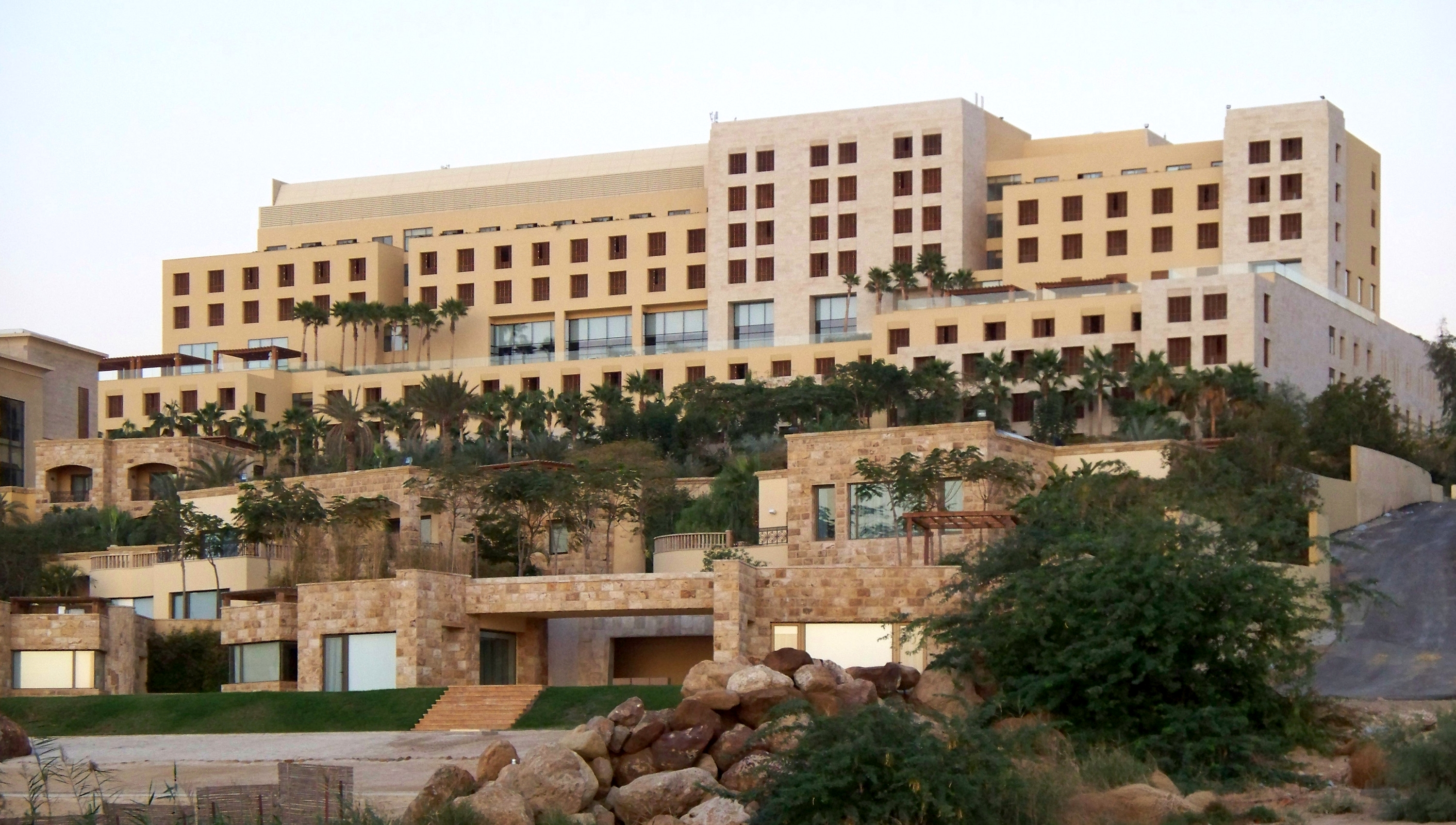
Kempinski Hotel, one of the many hotels on the Jordanian shore

On the Jordanian side, nine international franchises have opened seaside resort hotels near the King Hussein Bin Talal Convention Center, along with resort apartments, on the eastern shore of the Dead Sea. The 9 hotels have boosted the Jordanian side's capacity to 2,800 rooms.

On 22 November 2015, the Dead Sea panorama road was included along with 40 archaeological locations in Jordan, to become live on Google Street View.

=== Palestine (West Bank) ===
The portion of Dead Sea coast which Palestinians could possibly eventually manage is about 40 kilometres (25 miles) long. The World Bank estimates that such Dead Sea tourism industry could generate $290 million of revenues per year and 2,900 jobs. However, Palestinians have been unable to obtain construction permits for tourism-related investments on the Dead Sea. According to the World Bank, officials in the Palestinian Ministry of Tourism and Antiquities state that the only way to apply for such permits is through the Joint Committees established under the Oslo Agreement, but the relevant committee has not met with any degree of regularity since 2000.

== Chemical industry ==
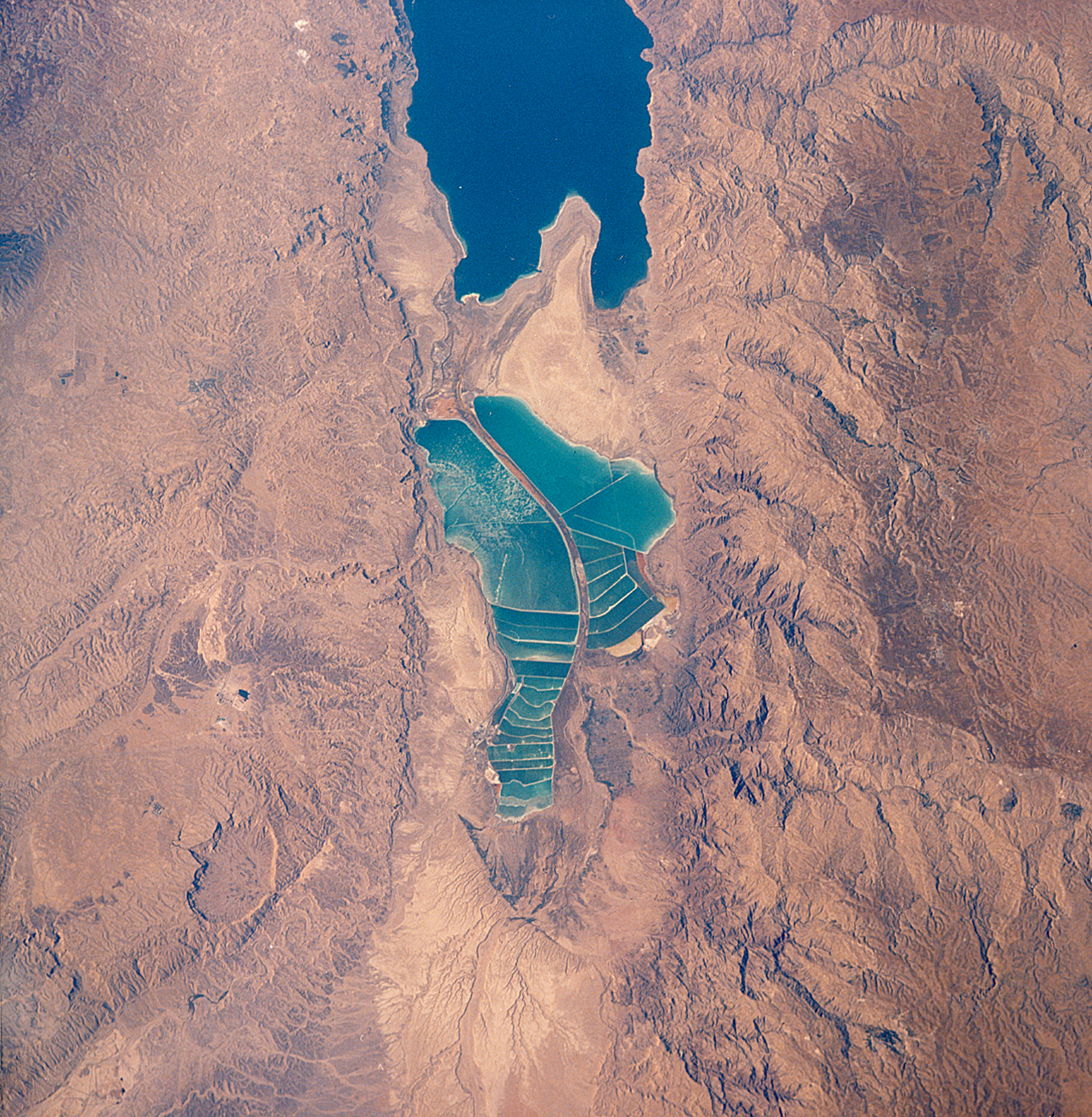
View of salt evaporation pans on the Dead Sea, taken in 1989 from the Space Shuttle Columbia (STS-28). The southern half is separated from the northern half at what used to be the Lisan Peninsula because of the fall in level of the Dead Sea.

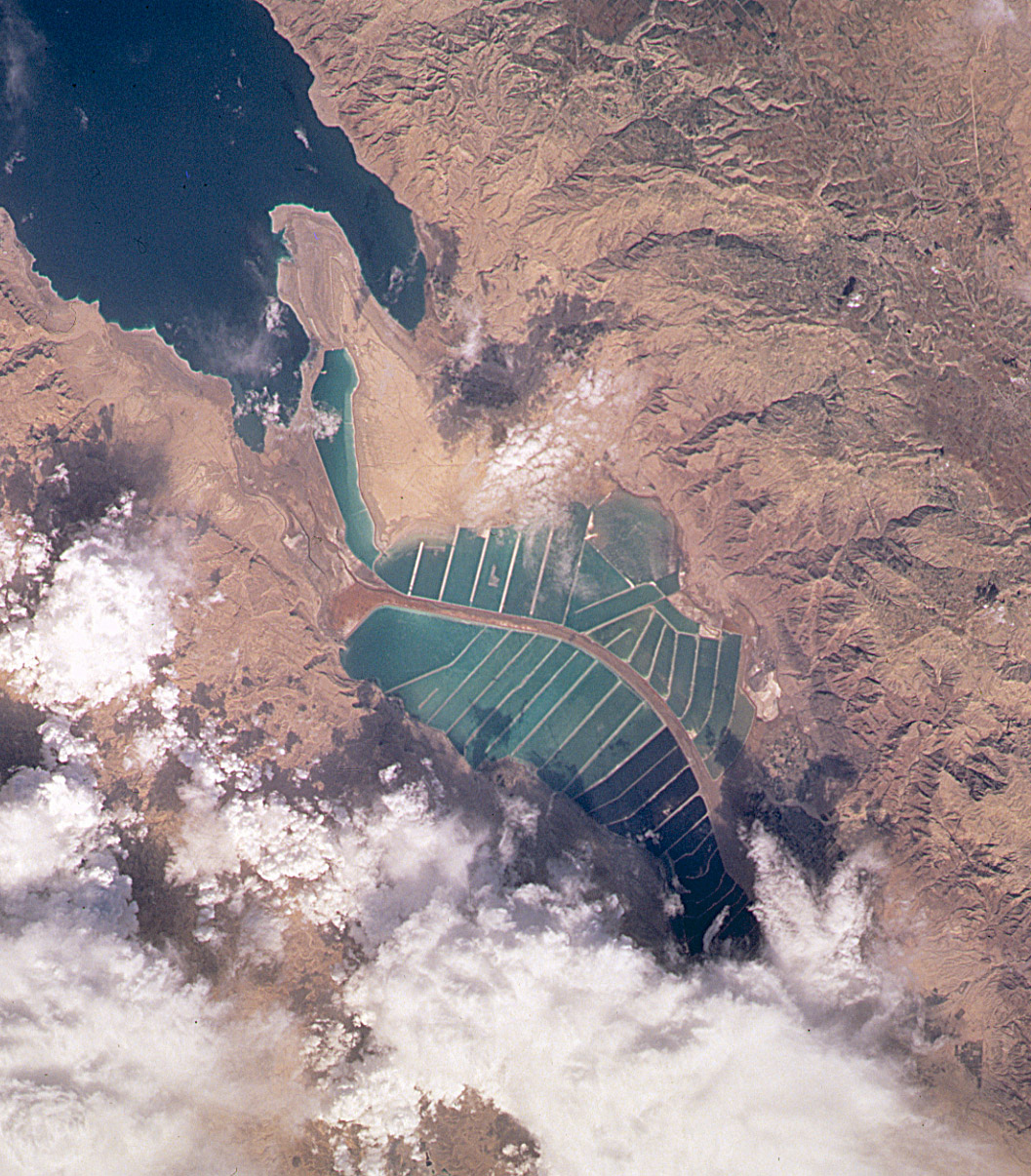
View of the mineral evaporation ponds almost 12 years later (STS-102). A northern and small southeastern extension were added and the large polygonal ponds subdivided.

=== British Mandate period ===
In the early part of the 20th century, the Dead Sea began to attract interest from chemists who deduced the sea was a natural deposit of potash (potassium chloride) and bromine. A concession was granted by the British Mandatory government to the newly formed Palestine Potash Company in 1929. Its founder, Siberian Jewish engineer and pioneer of Lake Baikal exploitation, Moses Novomeysky, had worked for the charter for over ten years having first visited the area in 1911. The first plant, on the north shore of the Dead Sea at Kalya, commenced production in 1931 and produced potash by solar evaporation of the brine. Employing Arabs and Jews, it was an island of peace in turbulent times. In 1934 a second plant was built on the southwest shore, in the Mount Sodom area, south of the 'Lashon' region of the Dead Sea. Palestine Potash Company supplied half of Britain's potash during World War II. Both plants were destroyed by the Jordanians in the 1948 Arab–Israeli War.

=== Israel ===
The Dead Sea Works was founded in 1952 as a state-owned enterprise based on the remnants of the Palestine Potash Company. In 1995, the company was privatized and it is now owned by Israel Chemicals. From the Dead Sea brine, Israel produces (2001) 1.77 million tons potash, 206,000 tons elemental bromine, 44,900 tons caustic soda, 25,000 tons magnesium metal, and sodium chloride. Israeli companies generate around US$3 billion annually from the sale of Dead Sea minerals (primarily potash and bromine), and from other products that are derived from Dead Sea Minerals.

=== Jordan ===
On the Jordanian side of the Dead Sea, Arab Potash (APC), formed in 1956, produces 2.0 million tons of potash annually, as well as sodium chloride and bromine. The plant is located at Safi, South Aghwar Department, in the Karak Governorate.

Jordanian Dead Sea mineral industries generate about $1.2 billion in sales (equivalent to 4 percent of Jordan's GDP).

=== West Bank ===
The Palestinian Dead Sea Coast is about 40 kilometres (25 miles) long. The Palestinian economy is unable to benefit from Dead Sea chemicals due to restricted access, permit issues and the uncertainties of the investment climate. The World Bank estimates that a Palestinian Dead Sea chemicals industry could generate $918M incremental value added per year, "almost equivalent to the contribution of the entire manufacturing sector of Palestinian territories today".

=== Extraction ===
Both Dead Sea Works Ltd. and Arab Potash use extensive salt evaporation pans that have essentially diked the entire southern end of the Dead Sea for the purpose of producing carnallite, potassium magnesium chloride, which is then processed further to produce potassium chloride. The ponds are separated by a central dike that runs roughly north–south along the international border. The power plant on the Israeli side allows production of magnesium metal (by a subsidiary, Dead Sea Magnesium Ltd.).

Due to the popularity of the sea's therapeutic and healing properties, several companies have also shown interest in the manufacturing and supplying of Dead Sea salts as raw materials for body and skin care products.

== Recession and environmental concerns ==
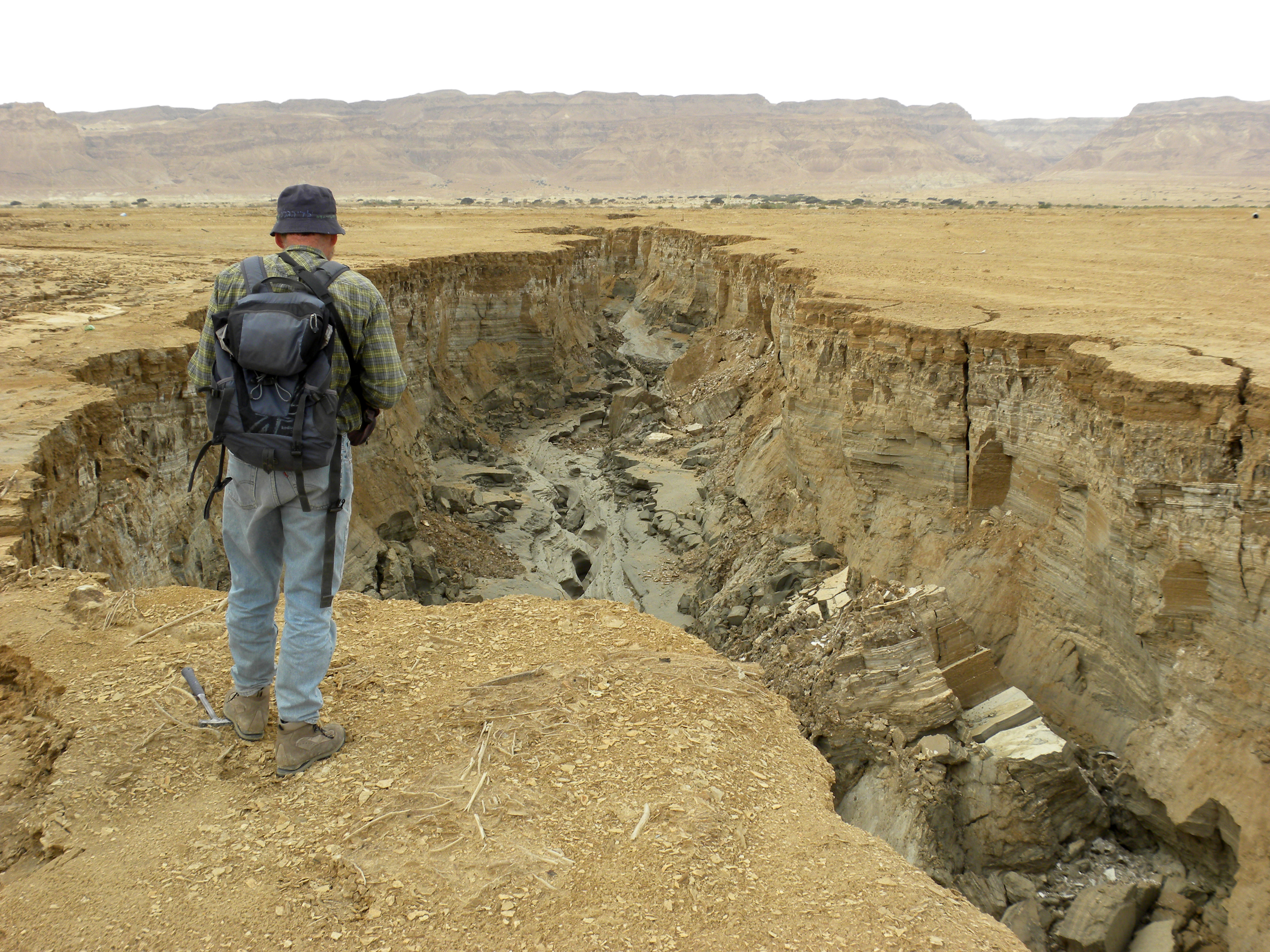
Gully in unconsolidated Dead Sea sediments exposed by recession of water levels. It was excavated by floods from the Judean Mountains in less than a year.

=== Receding shoreline ===
Since 1930, when its surface was 1,050 km^{2} (410 sq mi) and its level was 390 m (1,280 ft) below sea level, the Dead Sea has been monitored continuously. The Dead Sea has been rapidly shrinking since the 1960s because of diversion of incoming water from the Jordan River to the north as part of the National Water Carrier scheme, completed in 1964. The southern end is fed by a canal maintained by the Dead Sea Works, a company that converts the sea's raw materials. From a water surface of 395 m (1,296 ft) below sea level in 1970 it fell 22 to 418 m (72 to 1,371 ft) below sea level in 2006, reaching a drop rate of 1 m (3 ft) per year. By 2025 it reached a height of 439 m (1,440 ft) below sea level, a drop of more than 1 m (3 ft) per year. As the water level decreases, the characteristics of the Sea and surrounding region may substantially change.

As of 2021, the surface of the Sea has shrunk by about 33 percent since the 1960s, which is partly attributed to the much-reduced flow of the Jordan River since the construction of the National Water Carrier project, and the amount of water from the rains reaching the Dead Sea has diminished even further since flash floods started pouring into the sinkholes left by its shrinkage. The EcoPeace Middle East, a joint Israeli-Palestinian-Jordanian environmental group, has estimated that the annual flow into the Dead Sea from the Jordan is as of 2021 less than 100,000,000 cubic metres (3.5×10^{9} cu ft) of water, compared with former flows of between 1,200,000,000 cubic metres (4.2×10^{10} cu ft) and 1,300,000,000 cubic metres (4.6×10^{10} cu ft).

Year	Water level (m)	Surface (km^{2})
1930	−390	1050
1980	−400	680
1992	−407	675
1997	−411	670
2004	−417	662
2010	−423	655
2016	−430.5	605
2025	−439	554

Sources: Israel Oceanographic and Limnological Research, Haaretz, Jordan Valley Authority.

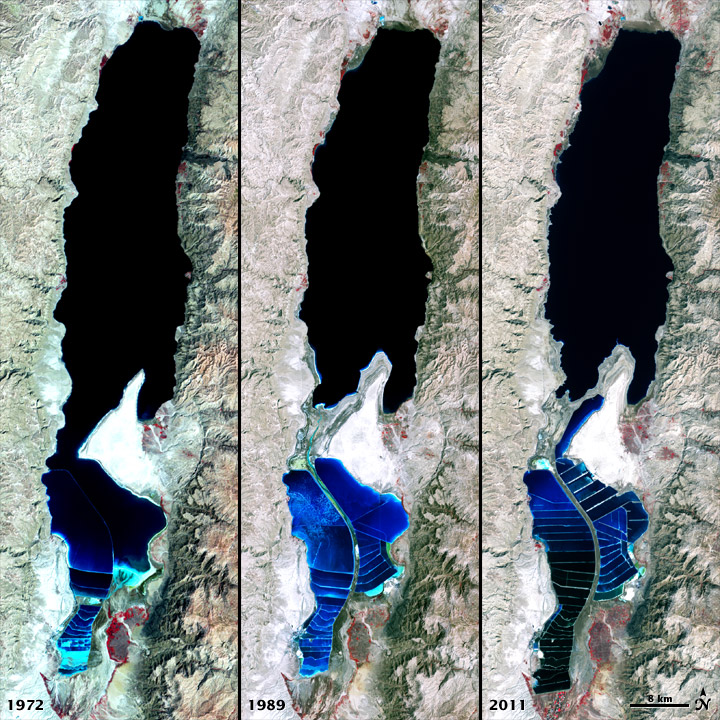
Views in 1972, 1989, and 2011 compared

==== Sinkholes and their impact ====
The Dead Sea level drop has been followed by a groundwater level drop, causing brines that used to occupy underground layers near the shoreline to be flushed out by freshwater. This is believed to be the cause of the recent appearance of large sinkholes along the western shore—incoming freshwater dissolves salt layers, rapidly creating subsurface cavities that subsequently collapse to form these sinkholes. As of 2021 Ein Gedi, on the western coast, has been subject to a large number of sinkholes appearing in the area, attributed to the decline in the water level of the Dead Sea.

As a result of the sinkholes, most beach resorts along the west shore of the northern basin had to be shut down, with just three remaining near the basin's northwest tip (see List of beaches in Palestine: Dead Sea).

=== Link to the Red Sea ===
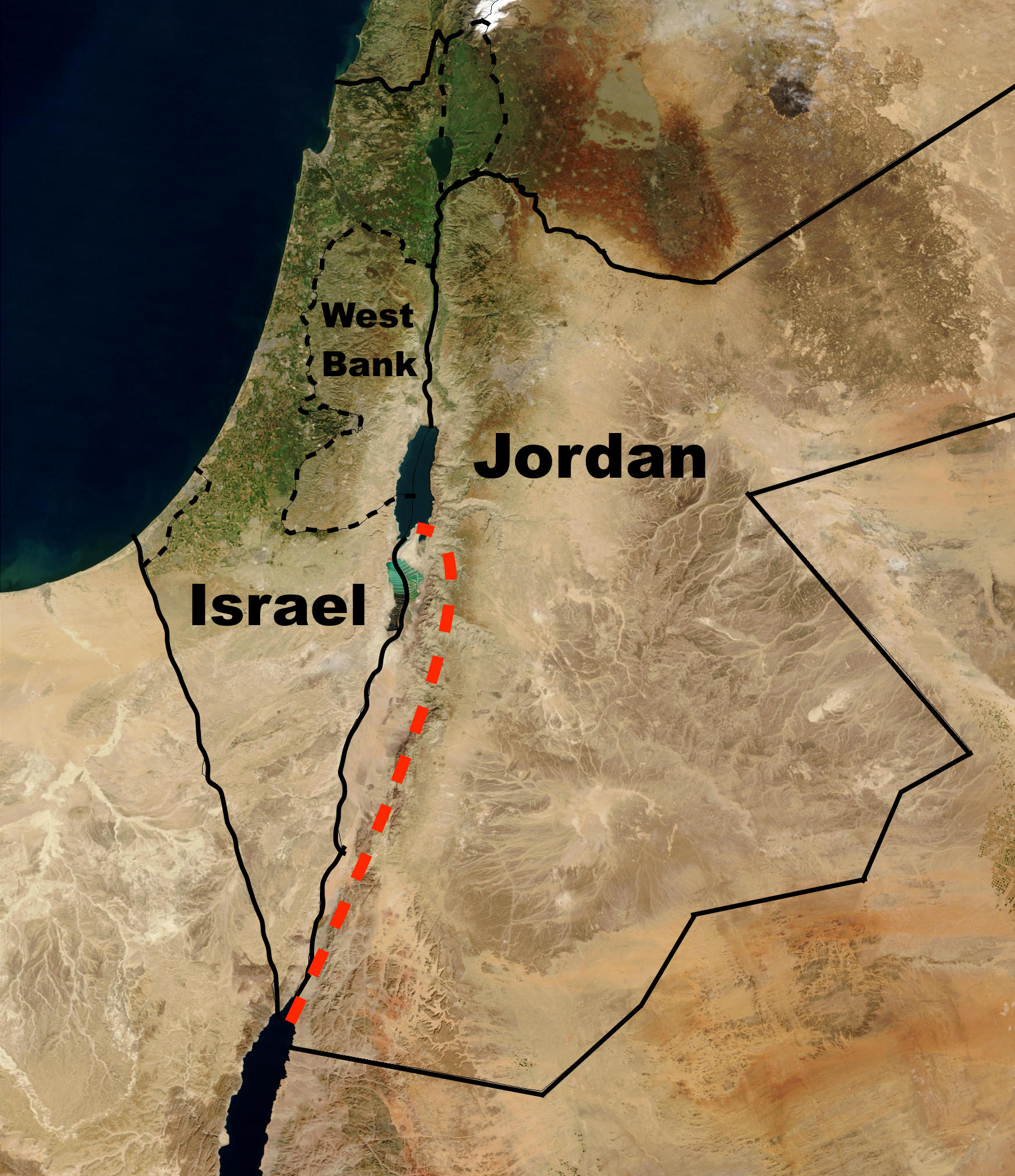
The proposed Red Sea–Dead Sea Water Conveyance

In May 2009 at the World Economic Forum, Jordan introduced plans for a "Jordan National Red Sea Development Project" (JRSP). This is a plan to convey seawater from the Red Sea near Aqaba to the Dead Sea. Water would be desalinated along the route to provide fresh water to Jordan, with the brine discharge sent to the Dead Sea for replenishment. Israel has expressed its support and will likely benefit from some of the water delivery to its Negev region.

At a regional conference in July 2009, officials expressed concern about the declining water levels. Some suggested industrial activities around the Dead Sea might need to be reduced. Others advised environmental measures to restore conditions such as increasing the volume of flow from the Jordan River to replenish the Dead Sea. Currently, only sewage and effluent from fish ponds run in the river's channel. Experts also stressed the need for strict conservation efforts. They said agriculture should not be expanded, sustainable support capabilities should be incorporated into the area and pollution sources should be reduced.

In October 2009, the Jordanians accelerated plans to extract around 300 million cubic metres (11 billion cubic feet) of water per year from the Red Sea, desalinate it for use as fresh water and send the waste water to the Dead Sea by tunnel, despite concerns about inadequate time to assess the potential environmental impact. According to Jordan's minister for water, General Maysoun Zu'bi, this project could be considered as the first phase of the Red Sea–Dead Sea Water Conveyance.

In December 2013, Israel, Jordan and the Palestinian Authority signed an agreement for laying a water pipeline to link the Red Sea with the Dead Sea. The pipeline would be 180 km (110 mi) long and is estimated to take up to five years to complete. In January 2015 it was reported that the level of water was dropping by 1 m (3.3 ft) a year.

On 27 November 2016, the Jordanian government shortlisted five consortia to implement the project. Jordan's ministry of Water and Irrigation said that the $100 million first phase of the project would begin construction in the first quarter of 2018, and would be completed by 2021. The project was officially abandoned in June 2021, having never broken ground.

== See also ==
- Aral Sea
- List of bodies of water by salinity
- List of drying lakes
- List of places on land with elevations below sea level
- Mediterranean–Dead Sea Canal
- Benjamin Elazari Volcani
- PEF rock with the Dead Sea level reference line used between 1900 and 1913
