= Christopher Costigan =

Irish priest and explorer

Christopher Costigan (12 May 1810 – 26 August 1835) was an Irish priest noted for his geographical exploration of the Jordan River and the Dead Sea.

Costigan became interested in the geography of the Holy Land while studying for the priesthood in Ireland. With no formal training in either sailing, navigation or geographical exploration, he arrived in Beirut in August 1835 where he bought a small boat and hired a Maltese sailor to be his crew. He transported the boat by sea to Acre, and then overland to Tiberias on the Sea of Galilee, with the intent of sailing down the Jordan from there to the Dead Sea. His timing was ill-advised, as the Jordan River was often unnavigable in the August dry season, and he and his mate needed to portage their boat on several occasions. When his mate would go no further, Costigan abandoned his effort to sail the length of the Jordan after eight days, and instead traveled overland the remainder of the distance to the Dead Sea, arriving weakened by insufficient water supplies on the way.

Once he arrived at the Dead Sea, Costigan, having run out of his supplies of fresh water, resorted to drinking the water of the sea, leading to further dehydration and fever. Before his illness incapacitated him, he spent several days sailing back and forth about the sea, taking depth soundings. Eventually, too ill to continue, he was taken by his mate to a local monastery and sent from there by donkey to Jerusalem for care. He died along the way and was buried on Mount Zion.

Costigan is remembered today as the first modern European explorer of Jordan River and Dead Sea, and is memorialized in the naming of Cape Costigan, the northernmost tip of the Lisan Peninsula.

== Sources ==
- "'The unfortunate Costigan', first surveyor of the Dead Sea". History Ireland. 25 February 2013.
- "Christopher Costigan". Palestine: Information with Provenance (PIWP database).
- Costello, Con (1978). "Letter to the editor: Christopher Costigan". Irish Geography. 11 (1): 214. doi:10.1080/00750777809555737.
- Haddadin, Munther J. (2002). Diplomacy on the Jordan: International Conflict and Negotiated Resolution (Illustrated ed.). Springer Science & Business Media. p. 5. ISBN 9780792375272.
- "History of the Dead Sea". DeadSea.com. July 2016.
