= Mount Sodom =

Hill in Israel

Coordinates: 31°4′19″N 35°23′49″E

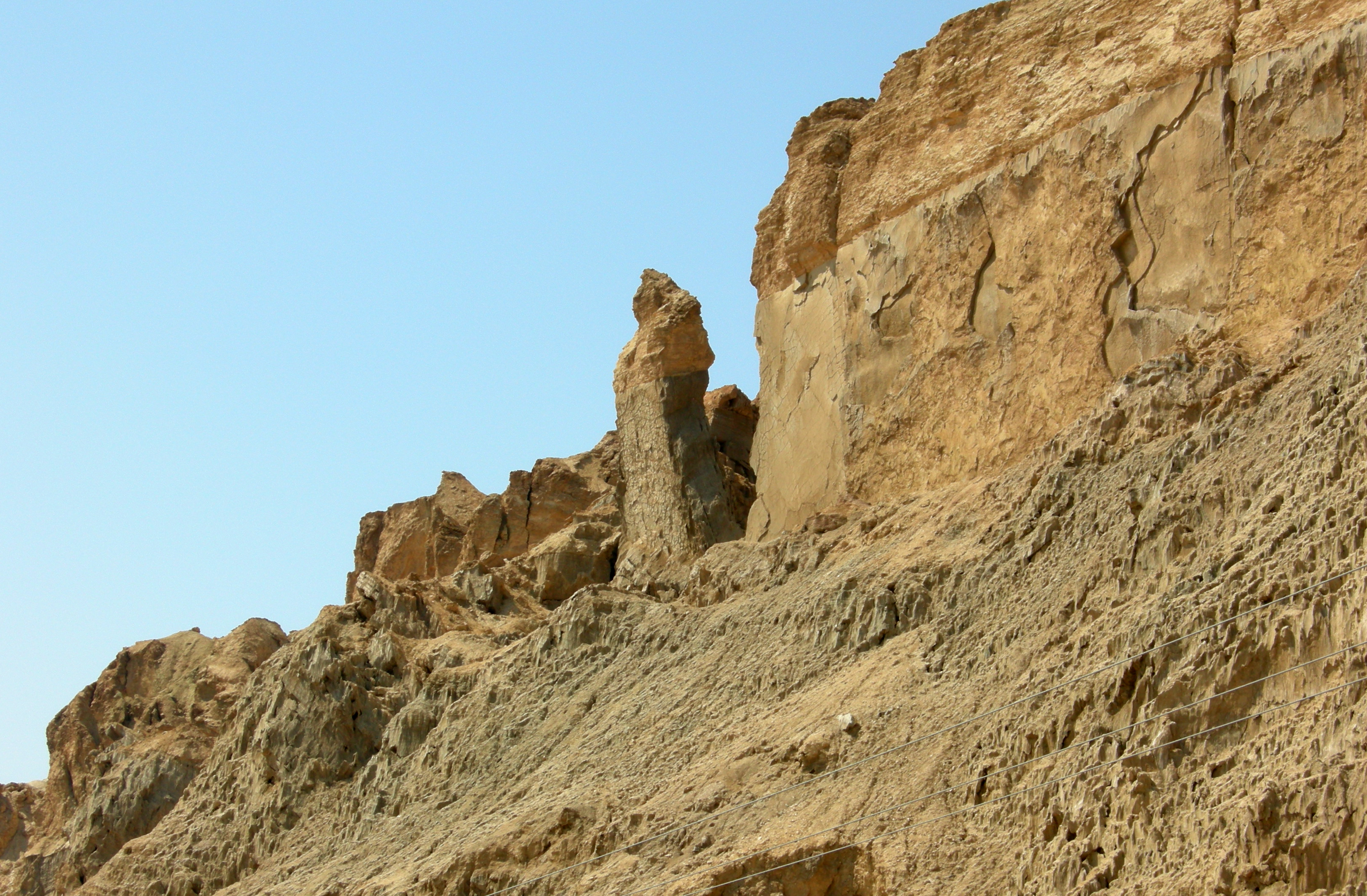
The "Lot's Wife" pillar on Mount Sodom, Israel, made of halite

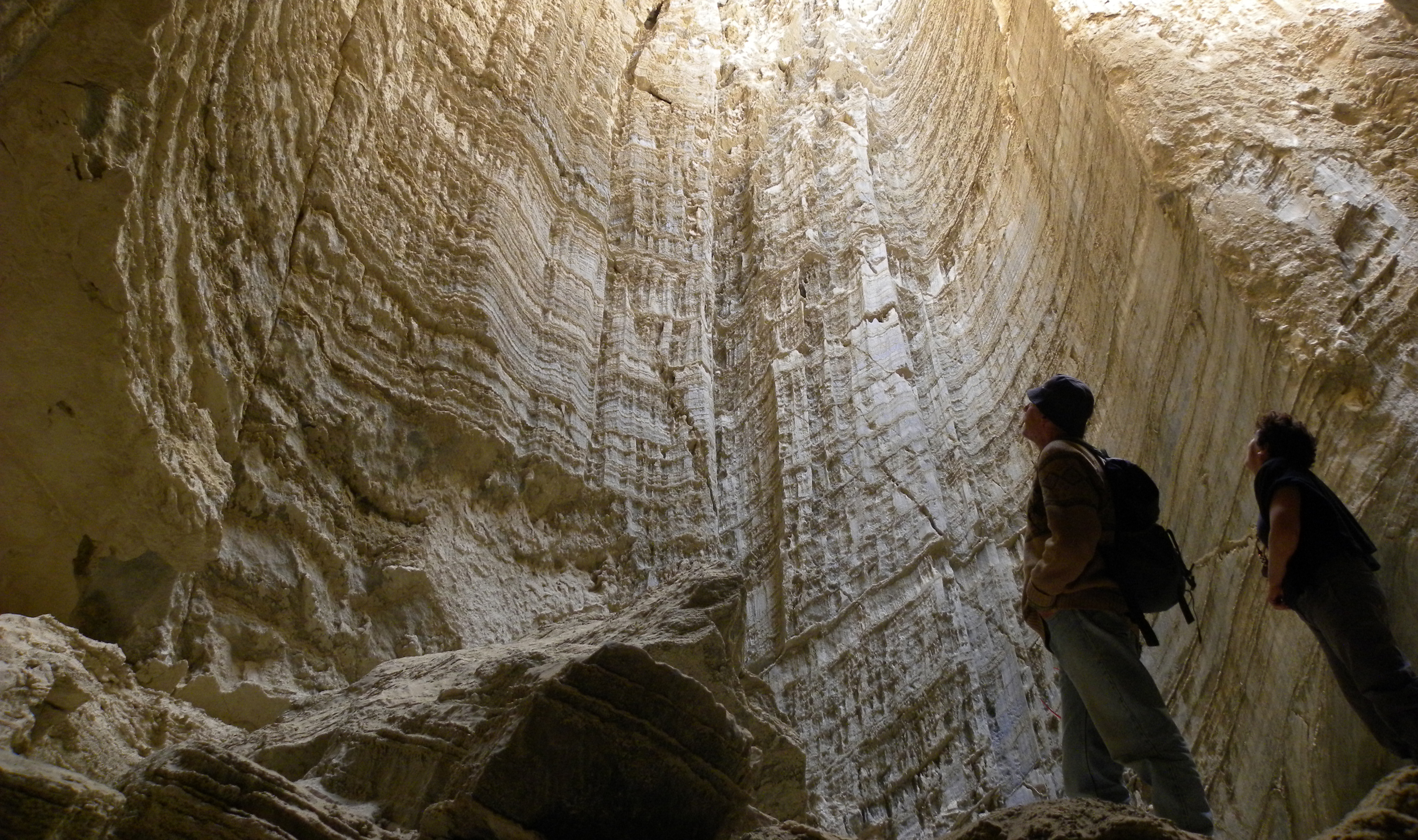
Salt cave in Mount Sodom

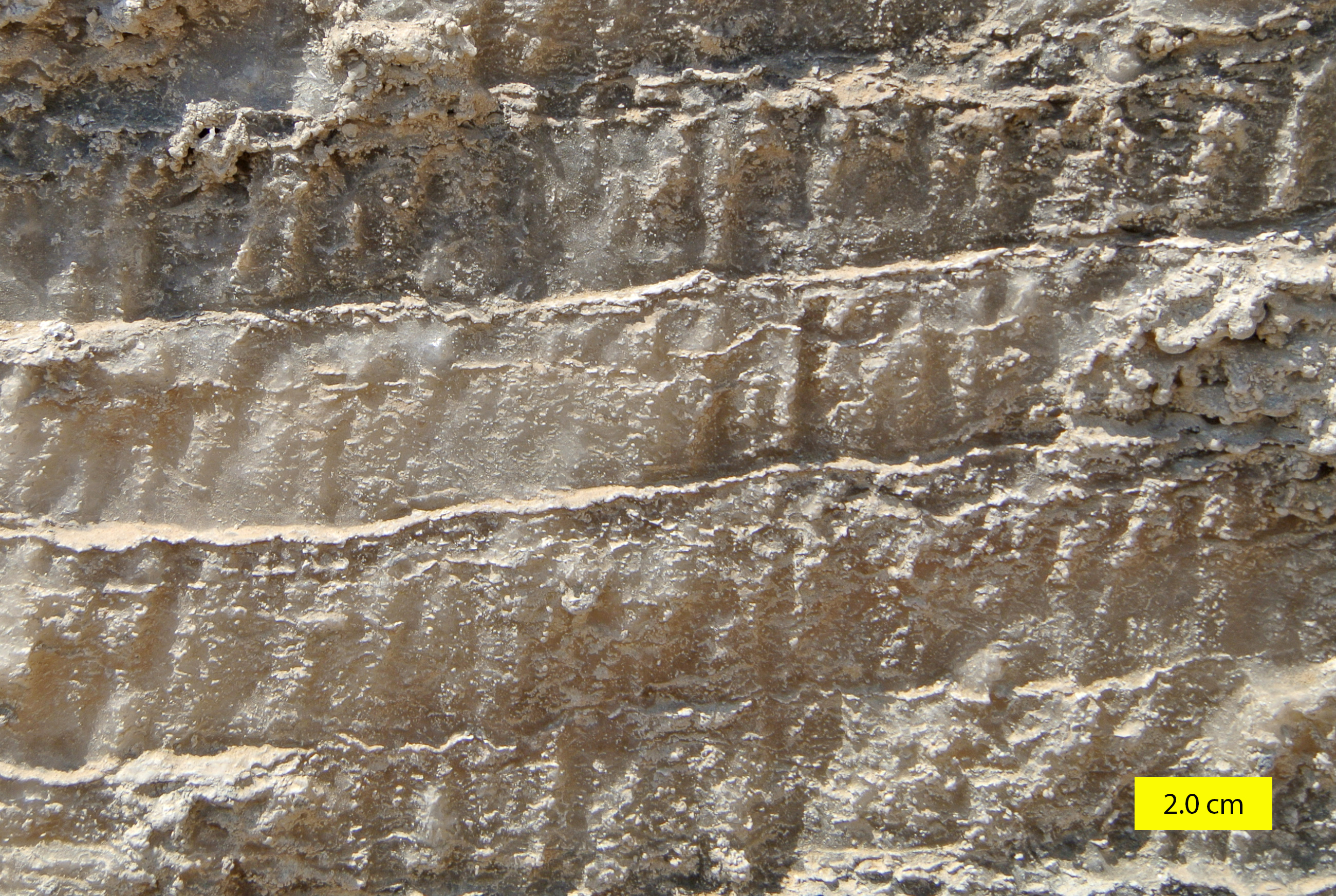
Bedded halite at Mount Sodom

Mount Sodom (Hebrew: הר סדום, Har Sedom) is a hill along the southwestern part of the Dead Sea in Israel; it is part of the Judaean Desert Nature Reserve. It takes its name from the biblical city of Sodom, whose destruction is the subject of a narrative in the Bible.

== History ==
Mount Sodom began its rise hundreds of thousands of years ago and continues to grow taller at a rate of 3.5 millimetres (0.14 in) a year.

Movements of the Great Rift Valley system, along with the pressure generated by the slow accumulation of earth and rock, pressed down on the layers of salt, creating Mount Sodom. It is about 80% salt, 220 metres (720 ft) high, capped by a layer of limestone, clay and conglomerate that was dragged along as it was squeezed up from the valley floor.

It is approximately 8 kilometres (5 mi) long, 5 kilometres (3 mi) wide, and 226 metres (742 ft) above the Dead Sea water level, yet 170 metres (557 ft) below world mean sea level. Because of weathering, some portions have separated. One of these pillars is known as "Lot's wife", in reference to the Biblical account of the destruction of Sodom and Gomorrah.

== See also ==
- Judean Desert
- Nature reserves of Israel
- Tourism in Israel
