= David Coren =

Israeli politician (1917–2011)

- דוד קורן
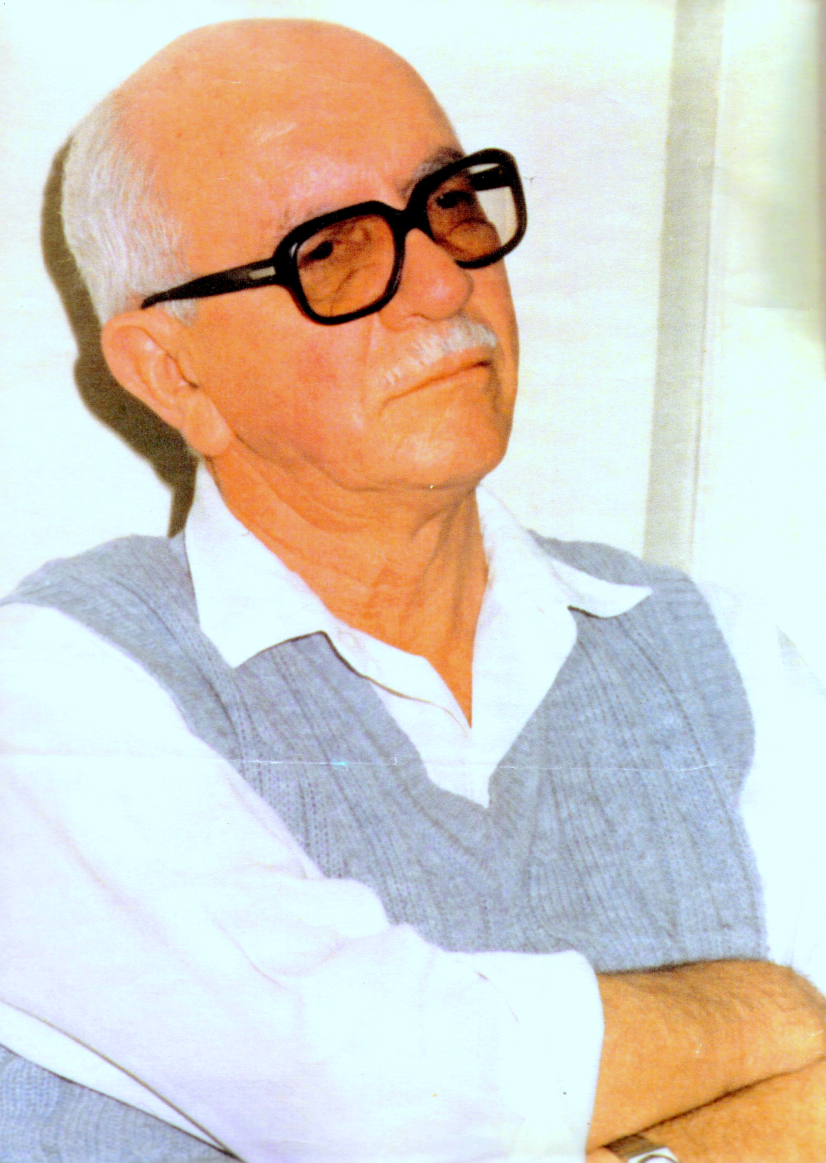

Faction represented in the Knesset
- 1969–1977: Alignment

Personal details
- Born: 8 June 1917 Jerusalem, Ottoman Empire
- Died: 14 January 2011 (aged 93)

David Coren (Hebrew: דוד קורן; 8 June 1917 – 14 January 2011) was an Israeli politician who served as a member of the Knesset for the Alignment between 1969 and 1977. He also served as head of Sulam Tzur Regional Council and as president of the Western Galilee College.

== Biography ==
Born David Coronel in Jerusalem in 1917, Coren was educated at the Rehavia Gymnasium, before studying at the Hakhshara in Na'an a Teachers Seminary in Ramat Rachel and for a year at the Hebrew University of Jerusalem. A member of HaMahanot HaOlim, he lived in the movement's commune in Tel Aviv from 1936 to 1938. Between 1938 and 1939 he worked as a labourer at the Sodom Dead Sea Factory, and was one of the founders of kibbutz Beit HaArava in 1939, where he met his wife Hana Fenet.

In 1939 he was a founder of kibbutz Beit HaArava, where he lived until 1948. He became a member of kibbutz Gesher HaZiv in 1949, where he lived until his death.

Following the establishment of the Israeli Air Force in 1948, Koren was appointed head of the personnel department at the request of David Ben-Gurion. Coren worked as an education officer in the Nahal from 1951 to 1952, after which he left the army and returned to working in Gesher HaZiv, where he taught in an elementary school and served as its principal. He subsequently founded Sulem Tzur high school, where he continued to teach. Returning to the military, between 1959 and 1961 he was head of the Youth and Nahal Section of the Ministry of Defense. He also headed the Administration section of the Israeli Air Force. In 1968 he became head of the Sulam Tzur Regional Council, but left the post before the end of the year.

A member of Rafi and subsequently the Labor Party into which Rafi merged in 1968, in 1969 he was elected to the Knesset on the list of the Alignment, an alliance of Labor and Mapam. He was re-elected in 1973, but lost his seat in the 1977 elections. He became head of Sulam Tzur Regional Council again in 1979, serving until 1981. From 1979 until 1980 he chaired the Union for Developing the Western Galilee, and from 1981 until 1983 chaired the Friends of Nahariya Regional Hospital. After Sulam Tzur merged into Mateh Asher Regional Council in 1982, he served as deputy head until 1991, also serving as chairman of the Western Galilee College (which he had helped found) between 1985 and 2003.

He died in 2011 aged 93.
