= Sodom Dead Sea Factory =

Coordinates: 31.0725°N 35.3982°E

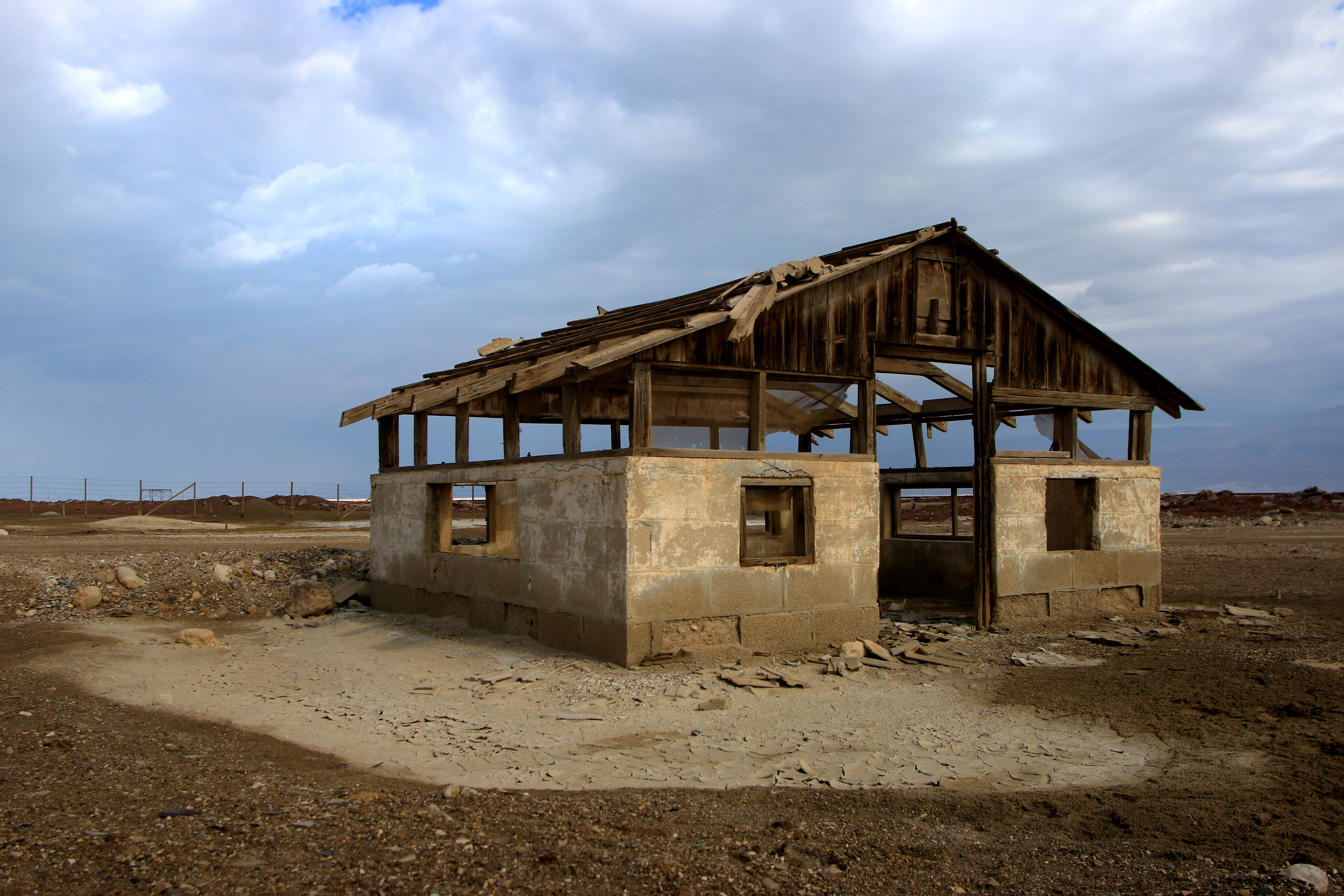
One of the shacks in the workers' camp

The Sodom Dead Sea Factory, including the Sodom Workers' Camp, is one of the two factories founded on the west bank of the Dead Sea by Jewish entrepreneurs before the founding of the State of Israel. It was founded by Moshe Novomeysky with the help of a British engineer in 1934. It was created to expand the ability to extract minerals from the sea through evaporation ponds in shallow waters. In the Palestine Potash Company's final year, the factory was responsible for 80% of the company's production and became profitable.

The factory has historically housed not only workers, but some of their families as well. In 1940, some 300 people lived on the factory's ground, including 40 women and 20 children. Until the founding of Revivim in 1943, the factory was also the southernmost location where Jews permanently lived in Mandatory Palestine. At the time, it was only possible to reach the factory by boat from the northern Dead Sea.

The Sodom Workers' Camp is defined as a heritage site in Israel. As of 2020, part of the factory is being restored to serve as a visitors' center for the Dead Sea Works.
