= Arava Stream =

Stream in Israel

Coordinates: 31°19′44″N 35°25′45″E

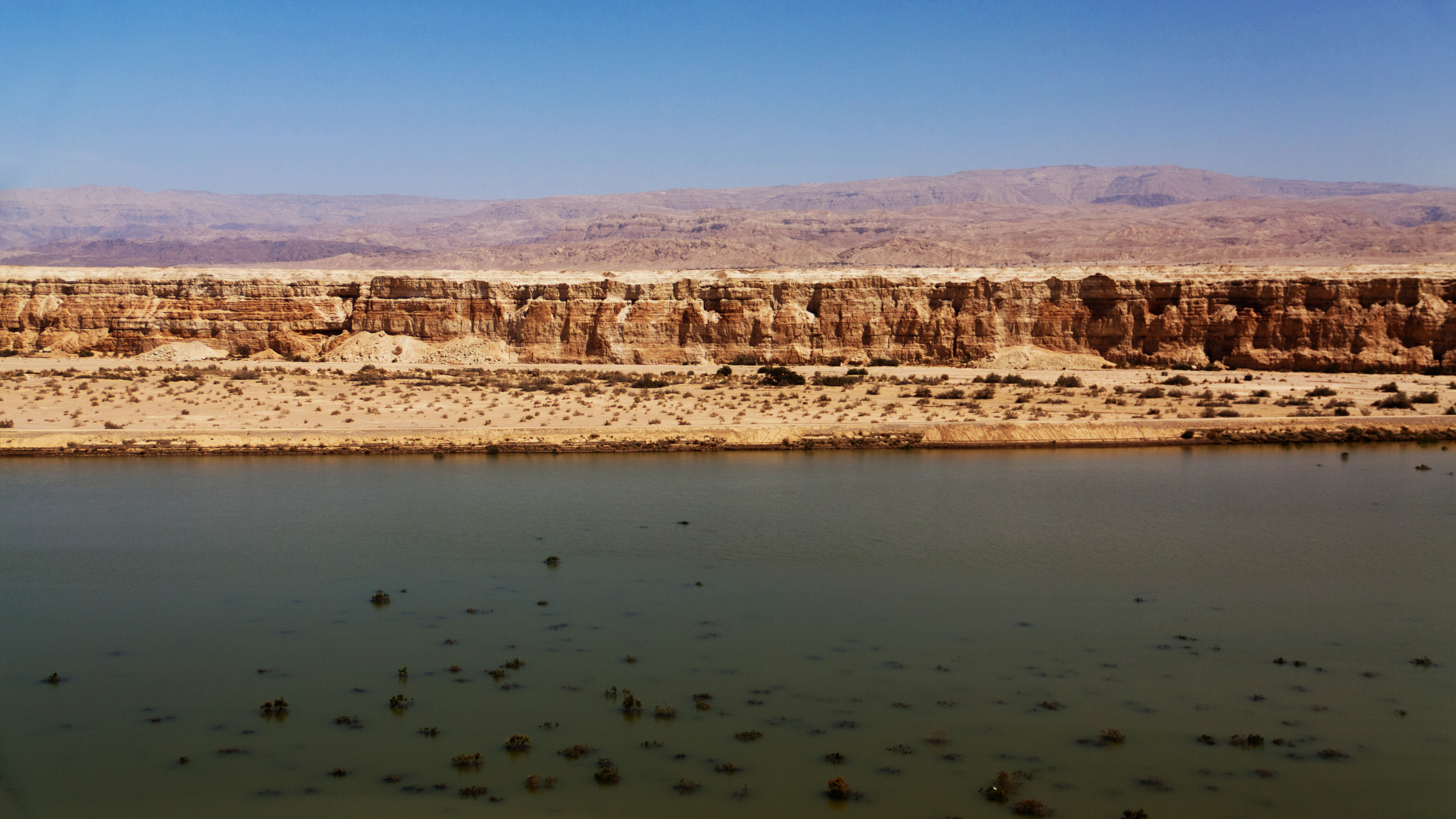
Nahal HaArava

The Arava Stream (Hebrew: נחל הערבה, Nahal HaArava) is an intermittent stream (occasionally flowing in the rainy, winter season) that flows from the approximate mid-point of the Arava desert in Israel's Southern District northward. It is 89 km long, and in many parts, serves as the actual border between Israel and Jordan. The stream originates on the crest of the Notza Ridge, which forms the watershed divide between the Dead Sea and the Red Sea, and from which all streams in the Arava desert flow either north to the Dead Sea or south to the Red Sea. The stream's prominent tributaries include: Nahal Paran, Nahal Barak, Nahal Tzin, Nahal Tzafit, and Nahal Nekorot. In addition to Israel and Jordan, parts of its drainage basin are in the Sinai Peninsula, Egypt.

== Northern flow ==
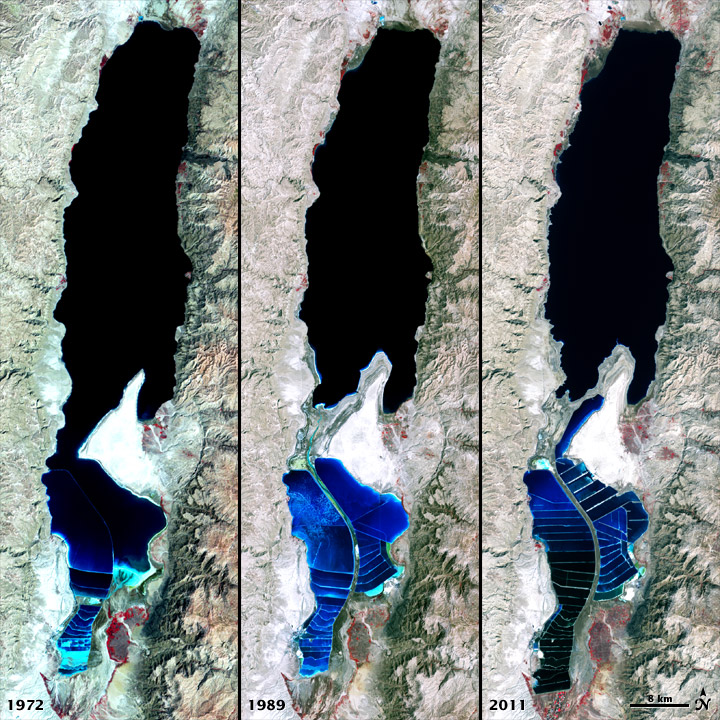
This series of Landsat photos shows the mouth Arvara Stream moving from the old southern shore of the Dead Sea to the southern end of the northern basin. In the two most recent photos, a narrow strip of land is visible along the international border, passing between evaporation ponds. The stream travels along this strip.

The stream flows into the area of evaporation ponds in what used to be the southernmost end of the Dead Sea and divides these ponds into the Israel area (managed by the Dead Sea Works) and the Jordan area. After passing the evaporation ponds, it drains into the Dead Sea parallel to the brine drain channel. After the Dead Sea basin was severed into the northern and southern parts, the area between them turned into dry seabed. It is a dangerous area due to sinkholes and land mines, and the entrance there is prohibited. The banks of the Arava Stream (and the brine channel) had become eroded in the area, and the continued erosion endangers the stability of the evaporation ponds. Also the seasonal floods of the stream present danger to the chemical plants in the Mount Sodom area.

A correspondent of Kan 11 TV channel Oren Aharoni wrote a series of articles about the northern path of the Arava Stream and dubbed it a new "secret river" because it is mostly unknown to the general public.

== Hydrology and sedimentation ==
The Arava Stream functions as a primary drainage arterial for a massive transboundary catchment basin. Within the borders of Israel and Jordan alone, the drainage basin covers an area of over 2,840 square kilometers, and expands significantly further when including its Egyptian tributaries in the Sinai Peninsula. The riverbed architecture is defined by an active channel composed of coarse gravel, embedded within a broader, older alluvial plain composed of fine-grained silty-clay sediment.

Due to the regional hyper-arid climate, the stream experiences intense, episodic winter flash floods. These events carry enormous quantities of suspended sediment and mineral particulates eroded from the desert floor northward. When the floodwaters reach the northern terminus and discharge into the Dead Sea, they generate a massive, visually striking sediment plume. This dynamic water-colour phenomenon can extend for several square kilometers across the surface of the Dead Sea before the suspended mineral materials gradually settle to the lake floor.

== Tourism and infrastructure ==
Sections of the stream's path serve as a scenic and geopolitical backdrop for regional tourism, most notably along the "Arava Peace Road" (Hebrew: דרך השלום). This route runs in close proximity to the international border and the stream's natural channel, passing through agricultural landscapes and rugged desert terrain. A key vantage point along this route is the "Peace Lookout" (Hebrew: מצפה השלום), situated atop a steep clay cliff that offers expansive panoramic views directly over the riverbed of the Arava Stream, the nearby agricultural fields of the Arava settlements, and the Edom Mountains within Jordan.
