= Premier Dead Sea =

Israeli cosmetic and skincare product manufacturer

Dead Sea Premier Cosmetics Laboratories
- Native name: פרמייר מעבדות ים המלח
- Type: Private
- Industry: Cosmetics; skincare
- Founded: 1990
- Headquarters: Israel
- Key people: George Smoot
- Products: Skincare products; Dead Sea mineral cosmetics
- Brands: Premier Dead Sea
- Parent: Hadan Group
- Website: premier-deadsea.com

Dead Sea Premier Cosmetics Laboratories (Hebrew: פרמייר מעבדות ים המלח) is an Israeli cosmetics and skincare company that manufactures its products using mineral components extracted from the Dead Sea. It was founded in 1990 and is part of Hadan Group, which has been specializing in cosmetics since 1979.

== History ==
In 1990, a group of Russian researchers studied the effects of space travel on astronauts. Part of their clinical research was to address the effects of sagging skin, which resulted in developing Premier's first products. In the same year Premier's Center for Research was established together with its current owners, and five skincare products were developed. In 1994, Premier's first products received awards in the cosmetic field in Europe. In 1997, Premier launched its own skincare line in Israel and later abroad. By 1999, Premier Cosmetics held the largest share of cosmetics exports from Israel to Japan, and is currently one of the biggest cosmetics exporter from Israel.

== Current skincare products ==
Premier's skincare products are based on Dead Sea mud, which is believed to have benefits for deep cleansing and stimulation of the skin, combined with Dead Sea water and minerals, that are said to improve the metabolism, stimulate blood circulation and aid in the natural repair of cells.

Premier's skincare ranges include: First skincare line produced by the company, which includes bestselling products such as the award-winning Miracle Noir Mask. “Biox” skincare (2007), described as a non-surgical and affordable alternative to cosmetic procedures. “Ageless Future” skincare (2008) which is described as a cosmetic line which revives cellular metabolism. “Quartz Gem” skincare (2012), an anti-aging products enriched with Rose Quartz powder. In 2013, this line won the “Cosmopolitan Best of the Best” award. “Supreme” skincare(2013), a high-end anti-aging range aimed for the luxury market.

In November 2020, the company signed up American astrophysicist and cosmologist George Smoot as head of research for their NUNA advanced technology anti-aging medical device development. Smoot was chosen to lead Premier's medical research team in developing a home use anti-wrinkle medical device and a comprehensive cosmetic skin care line using advanced FDA certified anti-aging technologies.

== Signing Mariah Carey as company face ==
In July 2017 the company announced it has teamed with singer Mariah Carey to promote its products. Carey reportedly received $1.4 million for the collaboration.

== Awards ==
Dead Sea Premier Cosmetics Laboratories has received different awards over the years: GCI Magazine Award (2004), HBA International Award (2004, 2005, 2007, 2008), The Council for a Beautiful Israel (2012, 2013), Centrum Kosmetyki, Israel Cosmetics Industries Association and the Cosmetics Business Innovation Award (2013).

== Controversy ==
=== BDS ===
Although Dead Sea Premier Cosmetics' laboratories and suppliers operate within Israel's undisputed territories, the company has become a target for boycott-of-Israel campaigns, particularly in the United Kingdom and Ireland. Most economic boycotts against Israel target businesses running from within the disputed occupied territories, but some campaigners do not always distinguish between the two regions. BDS does not currently enlist Premier Dead Sea on its list of brands to boycott.

=== Selling Tactics ===
Unconnected to any economic boycotts of Israel is the international concern over the pervasive use of aggressive and often deceptive sales tactics by employees of so-called Dead Sea Cosmetics retailers at shopping malls worldwide. As a leading brand of Dead Sea skincare, this reflects heavily on the company's business even when uninvolved directly.

== See also ==
- Ahava, Israeli skincare company of Dead Sea-based products
- Dead Sea salt
