= Ahava =

Israeli cosmetics company

Ahava Dead Sea Laboratories, Limited
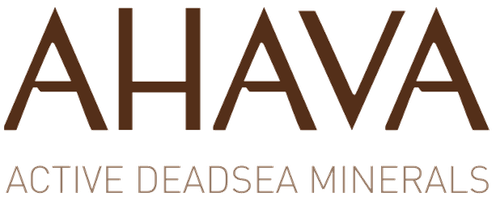
- Type: Private
- Industry: Cosmetics
- Founded: 1988; 38 years ago
- Headquarters: Lod, Israel
- Products: Skin care
- Revenue: $150 million
- Owner: Fosun International
- Number of employees: 200
- Website: http://www.ahava.com/

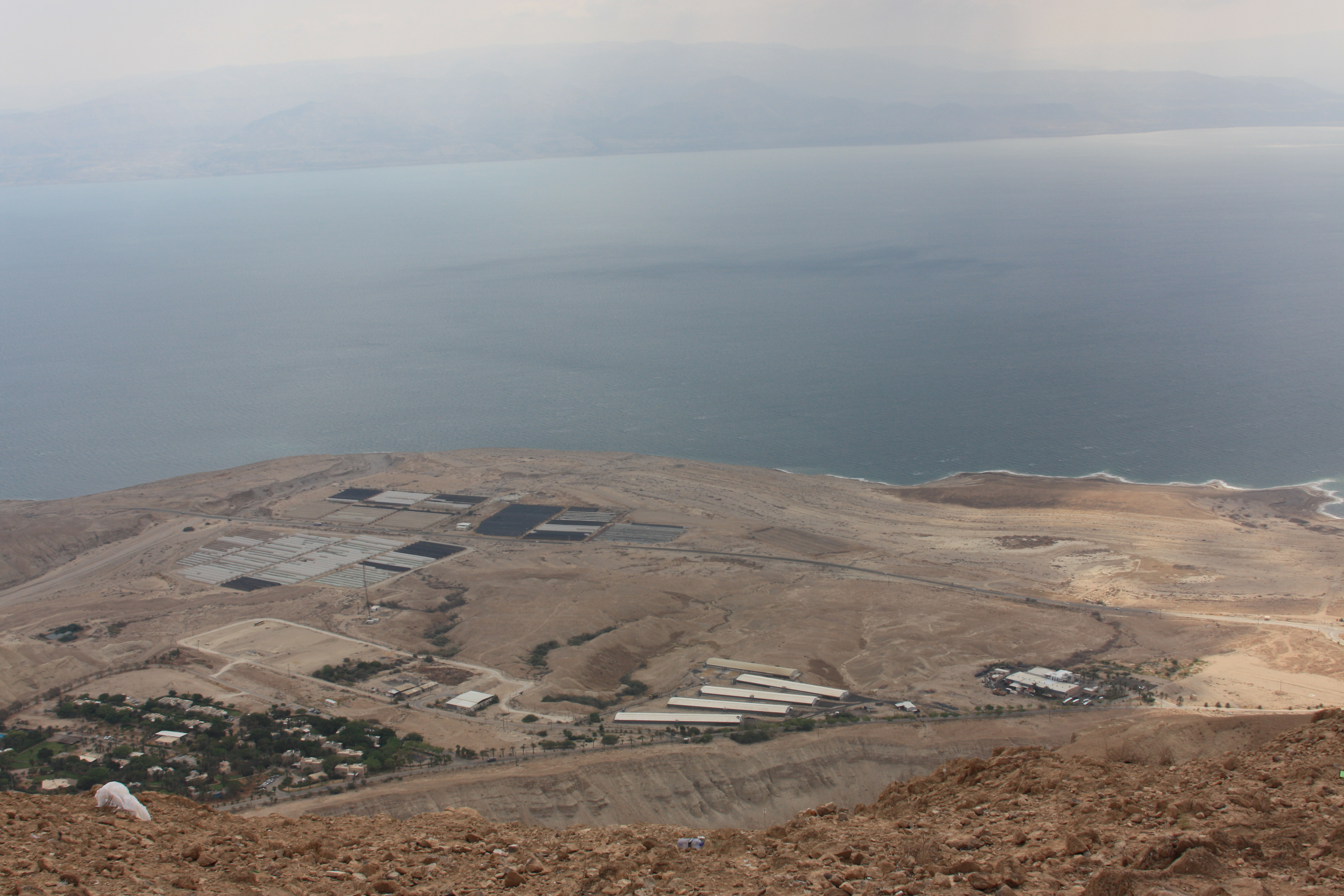
Ahava factory

Ahava Dead Sea Laboratories, Limited (Hebrew: אהבה, Love) is an Israeli cosmetics company with headquarters in Lod that manufactures skin care products made of mud and mineral-based compounds from the Dead Sea. As of 2015, Ahava's income was more than US$150 million a year. In 2015, the Chinese conglomerate Fosun International agreed to purchase a controlling share of the company, which has been valuated to ca. NIS 300 million ($77 million USD). A subsidiary, AHAVA Cosmetics GmbH is based in Wiesbaden, Germany.

Ahava products have been the target of the Boycott, Divestment and Sanctions movement because of its operations in an Israeli settlement in the West Bank. The company's main manufacturing plant and showroom were in Mitzpe Shalem, (Note: See map) an Israeli settlement and kibbutz located on the West Bank's Dead Sea shore.

== History ==
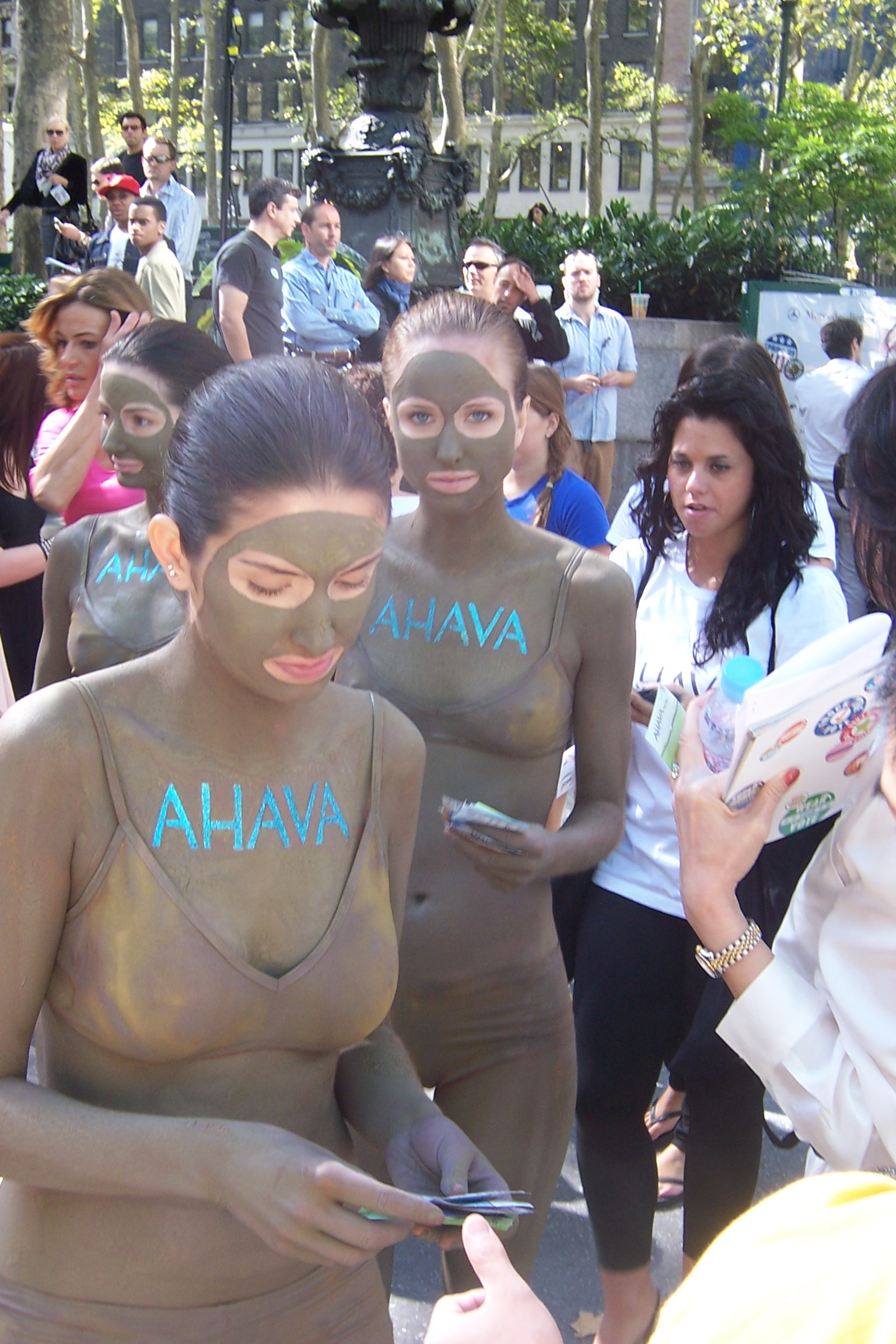
Models wearing and distributing Ahava products at New York Fashion Week in 2009

Ziva Gilad, a spa technician, came up with the idea of marketing Dead Sea mud after watching women tourists scooping up the mud to take home. Ahava was founded in 1988 as a single stand selling bottles of body scrub to tourists, generating $1 million that year.

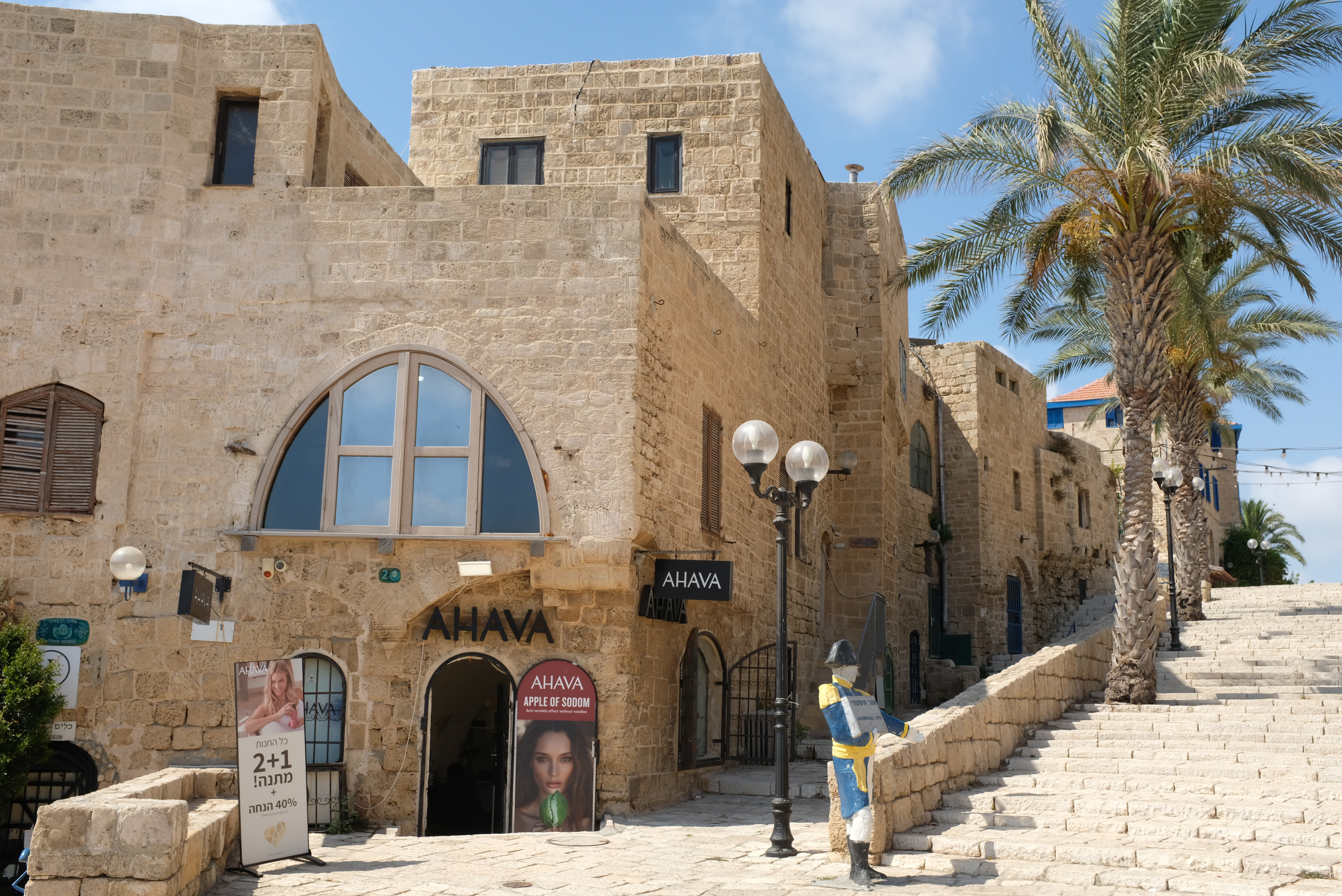
Ahava store in Jaffa, Israel, in 2021

As of 2010, Ahava is the only cosmetics company licensed by the Israeli government that is legally permitted to mine raw materials at the Dead Sea. On the Jordanian side of the Dead Sea, there are approximately fifty small companies producing cosmetics, but only 15 have a global presence. Israel has imported raw materials for its Dead Sea mud cosmetics from Jordan since 1994.

In 2009, Ahava took on new shareholder Shamrock Holdings, the investment company owned by Disney Family, which purchased 20% of Ahava Dead Sea Laboratories from its existing shareholders. The company has 200 employees, 180 of them in Israel.

In 2009, the company reported sales of nearly $150 million a year. In the United States, the largest overseas market for Ahava products, the company signed distribution deals with Lord & Taylor, Nordstrom and the beauty-supply chain Ulta.

In 2011, Elana Drell Szyfer, former Senior Vice President of Global Marketing for Estee Lauder, was appointed general manager of Ahava North America. In 2013, Szyfer left to work for Kenneth Cole Productions.

As of 2011, Ahava's shareholders included Hamashbir Holdings, Gaon Holdings, Kibbutz Ein Gedi, Kibbutz Mitzpe Shalem and Kibbutz Kalya. Of these kibbutzim, Mitzpe Shalem and Kalya are located north of the Green Line, in the West Bank. As of 2015, Ahava is controlled by Gaon Holdings, the Livnat family and Shamrock Holdings who together own 53% of the company; Kibbutz Mitzpeh Shalem holds 35%, Kibbutz Kalia 5.8%, and a group of local kibbutzim another 6.7%.

In 2015, the Chinese conglomerate Fosun International agreed to purchase a controlling share of the company, which as a whole has been valuated to ca. NIS 300 million (USD 77 million).

In March 2016, under its new ownership, it was reported that Ahava is moving its factory at Kibbutz Mitzpe Shalem to the Tamar Regional Council in order to avoid the EU directives against trade with companies operating in illegal settlements and pressure from the international BDS movement. However, a statement given by Ahava announcing the opening of an additional facility at Ein Gedi did not mention the closure of the existing plant at Mitzpeh Shalem.

== Products ==
Ahava product lines include a basic product for all skin types; other products for dry, sensitive skin and for men’s skin; and anti-aging products for face and body. Product lines include hand cream, foot cream, facial cleanser, body milk, facial nourishing cream, facial moisturizer, moisturizing shower cream and body cream. Some products claim to use citrus and citrus products as a source of vitamins and minerals.

Dead Sea mud, alone or in combination with other ingredients, is believed to have benefits for deep cleansing and stimulation of the skin. Minerals extracted from Dead Sea water such as calcium, magnesium and potassium, are said to improve the metabolism, stimulate circulation and aid in the natural repair of cells. In 2009, Ahava's Dermud range of skincare products was shown to have protective, anti-oxidant and anti-inflammatory properties that antagonize biological effects of UVB radiation on skin, reducing skin photodamage, photoaging, oxidative stress and inflammation in skin pathologies.

Therapy with mud packs for conditions such as osteoarthritis is relatively expensive and requires the assistance of a therapist and a treatment room. In the wake of these limitations, Ahava developed mud compresses used in the home which are heated in a microwave oven or a pot of hot water and placed over painful joints. A clinical research by the Ben Gurion University of the Negev, supported in part by a grant from "Ahava" concluded that the group treated with natural mud compresses had a reduction of 20% or more in Knee Osteoarthritis pain scores at treatment completion, at one month, and at three months, compared to the control group.

Embracing the trend toward more natural ingredients in cosmetics, Ahava purifies its own water and, according to the company, employs minimally invasive techniques to harvest mud and minerals. Ingredients are not tested on animals and Ahava products are packaged in recyclable containers.

== Scientific research ==
Ahava is one of several Israeli cosmetics companies researching nanotechnology applications. The company has established an R&D program to research nanoemulsion and nanosuspension with mud nanoparticles.

Ahava operates its own laboratory for cell and organ culture. It is the coordinator of SkinTreat (FP-7) and a partner in nanoReTox (FP-7) founded by Cellage, a European research consortium the specializes in skin cellular Ageing (FP-5). Ahava developed a laboratory model for in-vitro NP screening that is employed for studying inflammatory processes using UV- irradiated human skin organ cultures.

== Controversy ==
=== West Bank location and mud extract ===
There was a controversy about whether Ahava is in breach of international law, due to the location of the factory on the West Bank section of the Dead Sea shore. According to a 2012 report by Who Profits?, Ahava extracted mud from the occupied portion of the Dead Sea shore. Ahava was the only company that has an Israeli permit to extract mud for commercial purposes.

Ahava's factory itself was located in the occupied West Bank, triggering global protests. Ahava was licensed to extract mud from the West Bank section of the Dead Sea coast. According to human rights organization B'Tselem, several Israeli commercial ventures in the West Bank, including Ahava, breached the Hague Convention on the Law and Customs of War on Land, which prohibits exploitation of resources in occupied territory.

=== Ahava's position ===
Ahava's position was that the facility in Mitzpe Shalem was legal and that there did not exist a recognized right of any people's other than Israel to the West Bank, also reminding the mud as excavated from the Israeli part of the Dead Sea. Ahava's CEO has threatened legal action against boycotters.

=== Boycott campaigns ===
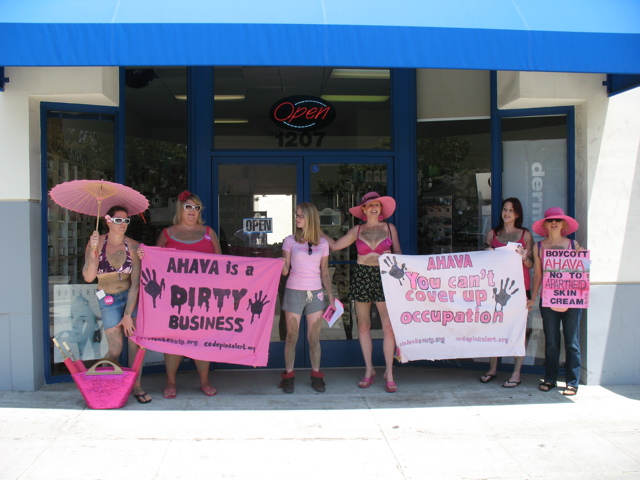
Code Pink staging a protest against Ahava in Los Angeles in 2009

Boycott campaigns have been organized by organizations such as Code Pink, which said that Ahava's products come from "stolen Palestinian natural resources in the occupied territory of the Palestinian West Bank", and are produced in Mitzpe Shalem.

==== European Union ====
In 2012, the British Natural History Museum was denounced in a letter signed by a group of 21 prominent academics and cultural figures for participating in a joint European Union-funded research programme with Ahava. The signatories said that "[Ahava-DSL] extracts, processes and exports Palestinian resources to generate profits that fund an illegal settlement. Israel's settlement project has been held... to break international law. Organisations which aid and abet this process may well themselves be found to be in violation." The museum said Ahava-DSL was chosen from a list approved by the European Commission and they "would not participate in any academic or educational boycotts that could restrict academic freedom".

As part of the economic agreement between Israel and the European Union, Israel cannot label products made in the West Bank as "made in Israel"; products made in the West Bank are subject to higher tariffs compared to products made in Israel. In November 2009, Dutch MP Van Bommel (Socialist Party) asked Dutch FM Verhagen (CDA) whether or not Ahava products that were marketed at the time in the Netherlands originated from the Palestinian Territories. If so, Ahava would not be entitled to a tax-exemption at Dutch customs. Verhagen promised to launch an investigation through the Dutch customs authority. In February 2010, the state-secretary of Economic Affairs Heemskerk responded to Van Bommel through a letter to the Dutch Parliament, saying records for the years 2007–2009 indicated that Dutch customs had not given tax-exemption to Ahava products.

==== United Kingdom ====
Ahava's store in a fashionable street of London's West End closed in September 2011 after constant protests by anti-Israeli activists. Owners of the surrounding stores complained to the landlord Shaftesbury plc that the repeated protests were affecting their business. A pro-Israeli group also held fortnightly counter-demonstrations, which attracted renewed controversy when members of the far-right English Defence League turned up, unasked, and joined in the demonstrations in support of Ahava.

In January 2011, Managing Director for the retail chain John Lewis, Andy Street, stated that it had stopped stocking Ahava products:

As a socially responsible retailer, John Lewis takes very seriously the treatment of workers and their working conditions. We expect all our suppliers not only to obey the law, but also to respect the rights, interests, and well-being of their employees, their communities, and the environment.

==== South Africa ====
In September, 2011, South African Industry Minister Rob Davies agreed in principle that goods manufactured in the occupied territories should not be labelled as a product of Israel since that is misleading. Davies said: "We're persuaded it's in the interest of South African consumers to know whether their products are coming from Israel or from the occupied territories." The new South African rules will ensure that such products, such as Ahava, are labeled "product of illegal settlement in the Occupied Palestinian Territories" before they can be sold in South Africa.

Prior to this, South African activists had submitted an affidavit to the South African Police Service accusing retailer, Wellness Warehouse, and local Ahava importer, SDV Pharmaceuticals, of violating South African trade law by selling Ahava products carrying false labels of origin.

In May 2012, South Africa’s Minister of Trade and Industry announced new labelling rules for Israeli settlement goods; Ahava was mentioned by name as a company whose goods were fraudulently labeled as “Product of Israel” when their place of origin is the occupied Palestinian Territories.

== See also ==
- Dead Sea salt
- Dead Sea Works
- Premier Dead Sea, Israeli skincare company of Dead Sea-based products
