= SaltWorks, Inc. =

American salt retail company

SaltWorks
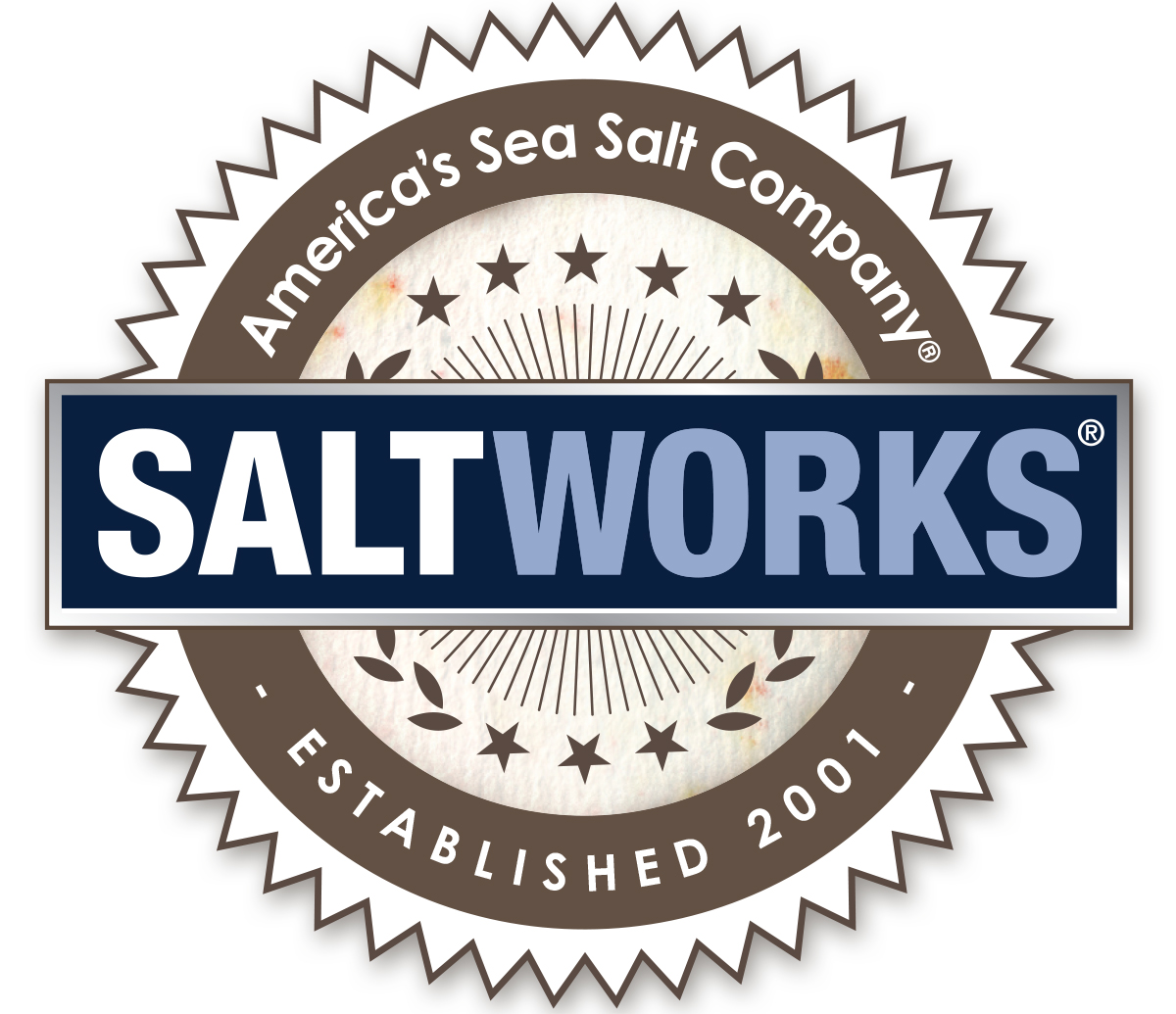
- Company type: Private company
- Industry: Salt
- Founded: 2001; 25 years ago
- Headquarters: Woodinville, WA, United States
- Area served: Worldwide
- Key people: Mark Zoske, CEO & Founder
- Products: Gourmet salts
- Website: www.seasalt.com

SaltWorks is an American company that imports, manufactures and supplies gourmet and artisanal sea salt. Headquartered in Woodinville, Washington, United States, the company sells gourmet and artisanal sea salts and bath salts for retail and wholesale use. SaltWorks was co-founded by CEO Mark Zoske and Naomi Novotny in 2001.

The company sells gourmet specialty salts under the Artisan brand and all-natural flavored salts under the Fusion brand.

== History ==
SaltWorks was founded in 2001 in Redmond, Washington by husband-wife team Mark Zoske and Naomi Novotny. Zoske previously designed water skis and wakeboards and Novotny worked in business development for a software company. The company was founded as an Internet-based business that sold gourmet salts. The couple initially financed the company with $1500 in credit cards. The company originally focused on individual consumers, but expanded to sell to grocers in the US and Canada, food manufacturers and specialty retailers.

In January 2006, SaltWorks launched its own gourmet brand, Artisan Salt Company. In November 2006, Saltworks moved from its original facility based in Redmond, Washington to a larger facility in Woodinville, Washington. The Woodinville headquarters holds the company's offices, and manufacturing and packaging facilities. SaltWorks later moved to a larger 100,000 square-foot facility in December 2011.

In 2014, Zoske received the EY Entrepreneur Of The Year 2014 Pacific Northwest Award. As of 2015, the company has been included on Inc. Magazine's list of fastest growing companies consecutively since 2007. SaltWorks' Seattle area salt processing facility received the Safe Quality Foods (SQF) Level 2 certification from NSF International in 2016. The certification ensures that food manufacturers abide by FDA guidelines and the Food Safety Modernization Act.

== Product ==
The company sells over 110 varieties of salts, including pink Himalayan salt, smoked salts, black and white truffle salts, Fleur de sel, kosher salt and more. The salts are imported from 14 countries, including Brazil, France and Italy. The company sells retail, bulk and wholesale volumes ranging from 5 ounces to 40,000 pounds. SaltWorks uses a combination of sifters, aspirators, and rare-earth magnets to detect and filter unwanted materials from its salt. SaltWorks fabricates most of its processing equipment on-site. The company does not use anti-caking agents or artificial flavors. All SaltWorks salts are certified kosher.

In addition to selling culinary salt under SaltWorks' own brands, the company sells its products wholesale to food manufacturers. The company also sells its salt as a private label brand to grocers and specialty retailers. The company also sells bath and spa salts including Dead Sea and Epsom bath salts.
