= Onchon Field =

Wetlands in North Korea

Coordinates: 38°50′00″N 125°15′00″E

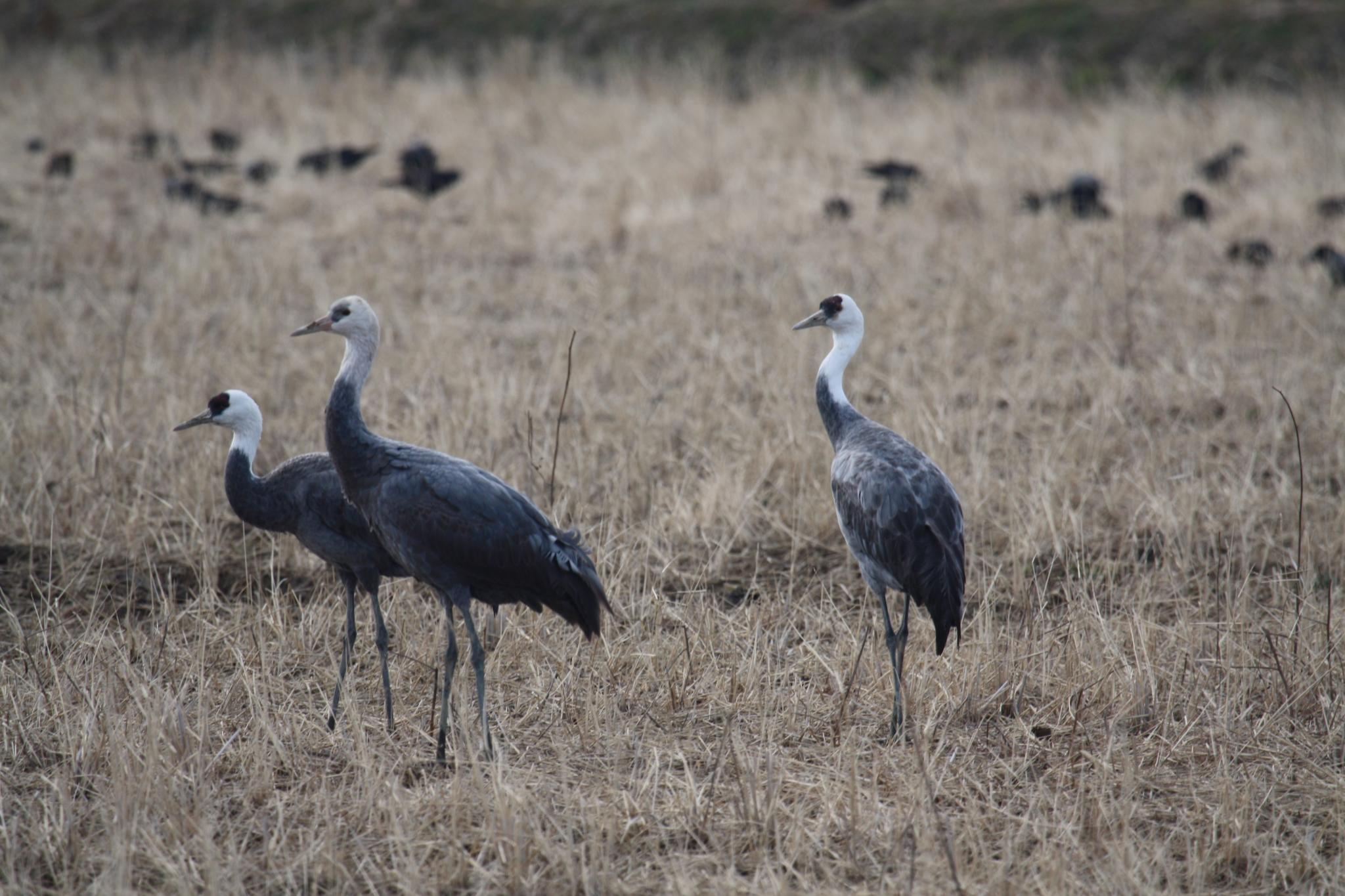
The site is important for wintering hooded cranes

Onchon Field is a 50,000 ha wetland site in South Pyongan Province of North Korea. It contains freshwater wetlands, rice paddies and salt pans. It has been identified by BirdLife International as an Important Bird Area (IBA) because it supports populations of swan geese, greater white-fronted geese, whooper swans, black-faced spoonbills, Chinese egrets, great bustards, white-naped cranes, hooded cranes and red-crowned cranes. It is threatened by agricultural intensification, aquacultural development and human disturbance.
