= Nahal Paran =

Seasonal stream in the Negev Desert

Coordinates: 30.3333°N 34.9686°E

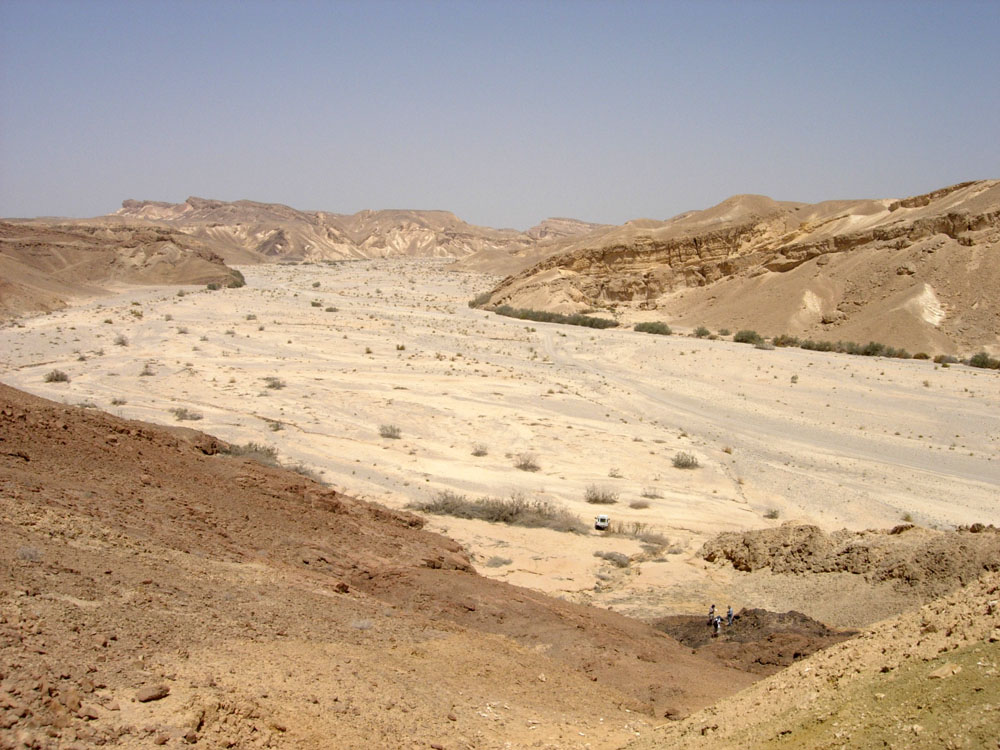
Nahal Paran

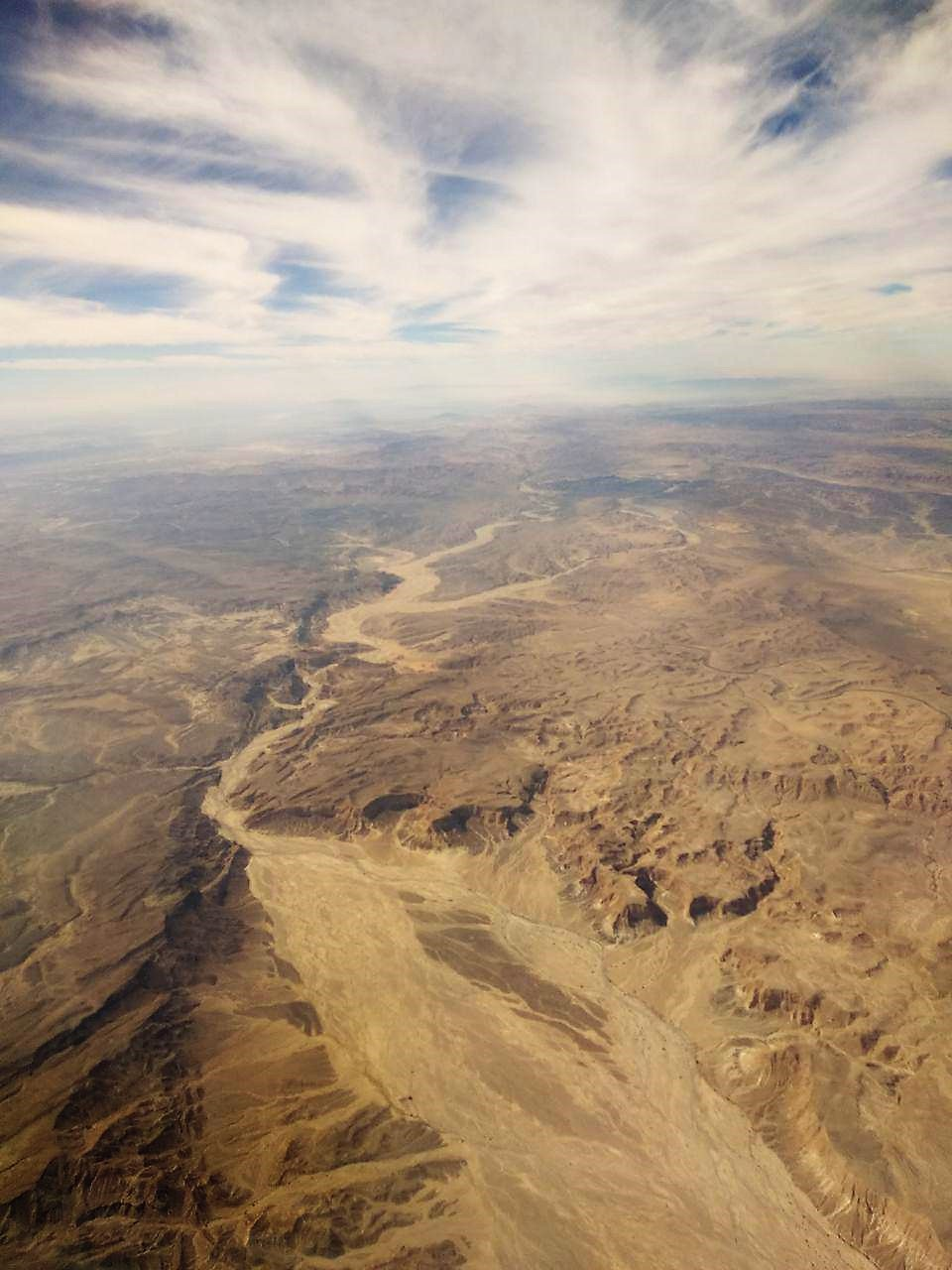
Nahal Paran Estuary aerial photo

Nahal Paran (Hebrew: נחל פארן, lit. 'Paran Stream') is a seasonal stream in Egypt's Sinai Peninsula and Israel's Negev Desert. With a length of 150 kilometers, it is the third largest watercourse in Israel after the Jordan River and Yarmouk River. It is also the widest watercourse in Israel.

== Hydrology ==
The origin of the river is in the Paran Desert of the Sinai Peninsula, and it flows into the estuary of Nahal HaArava. Water flow exists only during flash floods. This is the drainage basin's largest river, with an area of thousands of square kilometers, creating broad planes that separate the Negev's high north and the Eilat mountains of the south.

In the past, during floods, like other major rivers in the Negev, Nahal paran would flood the Arava Road (the main road to Eilat), until the construction of a bridge over the river. The stream had the highest recorded flow in Israel of 1,150 cubic meters per second on 6 November 1970. In 2014, the record was broken by a flow of 1,280 cubic meters per second measured at Zin. For comparison, the average flow in the Jordan River is 16 cubic meters per second.

Ground water near the riverbed provides drinking water for communities in the Arava desert. This water has high salinity and undergoes desalination.

== Geology and geomorphology ==
Geological and geomorphological research conducted along Nahal Paran indicates that the stream's channel undergoes significant bedrock incision. This incision process is dynamically controlled by the area's specific lithology (rock characteristics), tectonic activity associated with the Dead Sea Transform, and regional drops in base level.

Furthermore, scientific studies of the hyperarid environment surrounding the watercourse demonstrate that transmission losses, where floodwater sinks into the alluvial aquifer, play a critical role in the stream's hydrological behavior, directly affecting sediment transport and channel modification during major flash flood events.

== Regional development and agriculture ==
The water resources and geographic basin of Nahal Paran are closely tied to regional settlement and development in the Arava desert. Moshav Paran, an agricultural community founded in the region in the 1970s, heavily relies on the area's groundwater management and local infrastructure. The Jewish National Fund (KKL-JNF) has been actively involved in implementing water management solutions and supporting the expansion of the moshav's advanced greenhouse agriculture and community infrastructure.
