= Nahal Barak =

Canyon in the Arava desert of Israel

Coordinates: 30.4037°N 35.1208°E

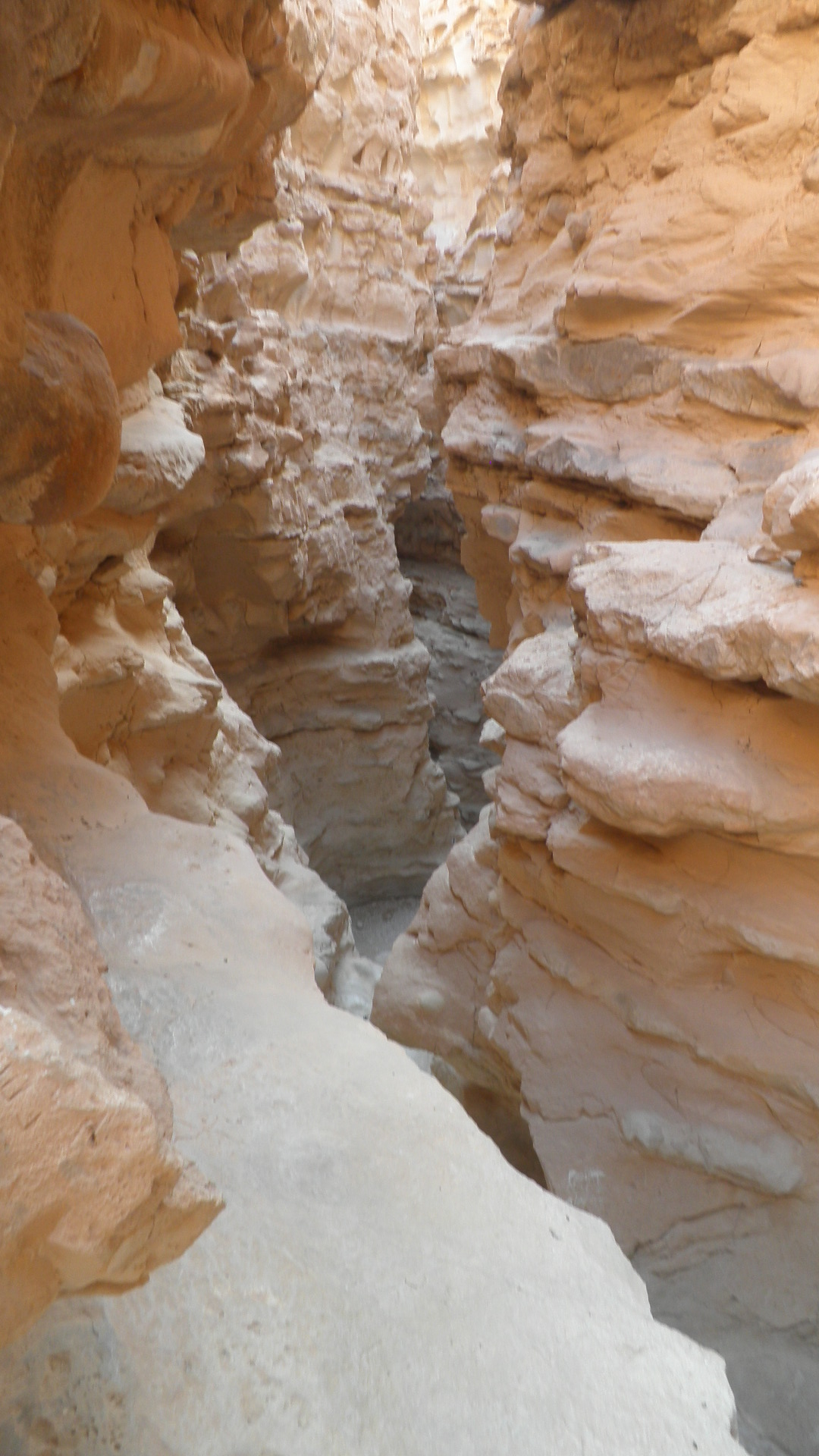
Nahal Barak canyon

Nahal Barak (Hebrew: נחל ברק), also known as Barak gorge or Barak river, is an intermittent stream and canyon in the Arava desert in Israel's South District. When it is flooded, Nahal Barak forms part of the network of streams that drain the Negev desert. The stream itself is 18 km long and flows in a general easterly direction into the Nahal HaArava, which in turn flows northward into the southernmost end of the Dead Sea. The stream cuts through limestone to form the gorge, which is known as White Canyon. There are several options of hiking at the Barak gorge including a tour.

== Geology and Environment ==
The canyon is characterized by its smooth, stark white limestone walls which earn the gorge its name, the "White Canyon". The narrow slot canyon features unique rock chutes, large boulders, and deep natural cavities carved into the stone by centuries of wind and water erosion. During the dry season, the canyon remains arid, but the rainy season brings flash floods that dramatically alter the landscape. These seasonal floods fill the deep rock pools within the canyon, transforming the dry stone hollows into standing pools of rainwater that can remain for extended periods. The local ecosystem supports various desert wildlife; native birds and herds of Nubian ibex are frequently observed near the canyon walls, particularly around sunrise and sunset when they forage on acacia trees and desert shrubs.

== Hiking Trail ==
Nahal Barak is a popular destination for adventure hiking, featuring a circular loop trail of approximately 7 to 8 kilometers. The route transitions from a flat desert walk into a technical climb through the narrow gorge, requiring hikers to navigate using installed rungs, tall ladders, and built-in climbing ropes to ascend or descend the steep limestone drops. While the hike does not require specialized climbing equipment, it involves strenuous physical exertion and is not recommended for those with a fear of heights.

The experience of the trail changes seasonally based on hydrology. During the dry months, the hike is completely dry. However, following winter flash floods, the standing water pools inside the canyon fill up significantly, requiring hikers to wade or completely swim through the deep water to move from one ladder to the next. Due to the severe danger of sudden flash floods, hikers must strictly check weather reports before entering the canyon. The site is free to access but lacks managed facilities, and the trailhead is reached via an unpaved dirt road branching off the main desert highway.

The hiking trail can also be extended into a more challenging, full-day trek by connecting it to the nearby Har Kipa (Mount Kipa) trail. This extended route climbs out of the canyon to the summit of Har Kipa, offering hikers panoramic views over the Arava Desert, the Edom Mountains in Jordan, and the winding path of the Barak stream below. Due to the steep ascent and exposure to the sun, this combined route is recommended primarily for experienced hikers during cooler months. To protect this sensitive desert habitat and ensure visitor safety, conservation efforts and the maintenance of the climbing infrastructure within the nature reserve are managed by the Israel Nature and Parks Authority.
