= Western Galilee College =

Academic College in Akko, Israel

Western Galilee Academic College
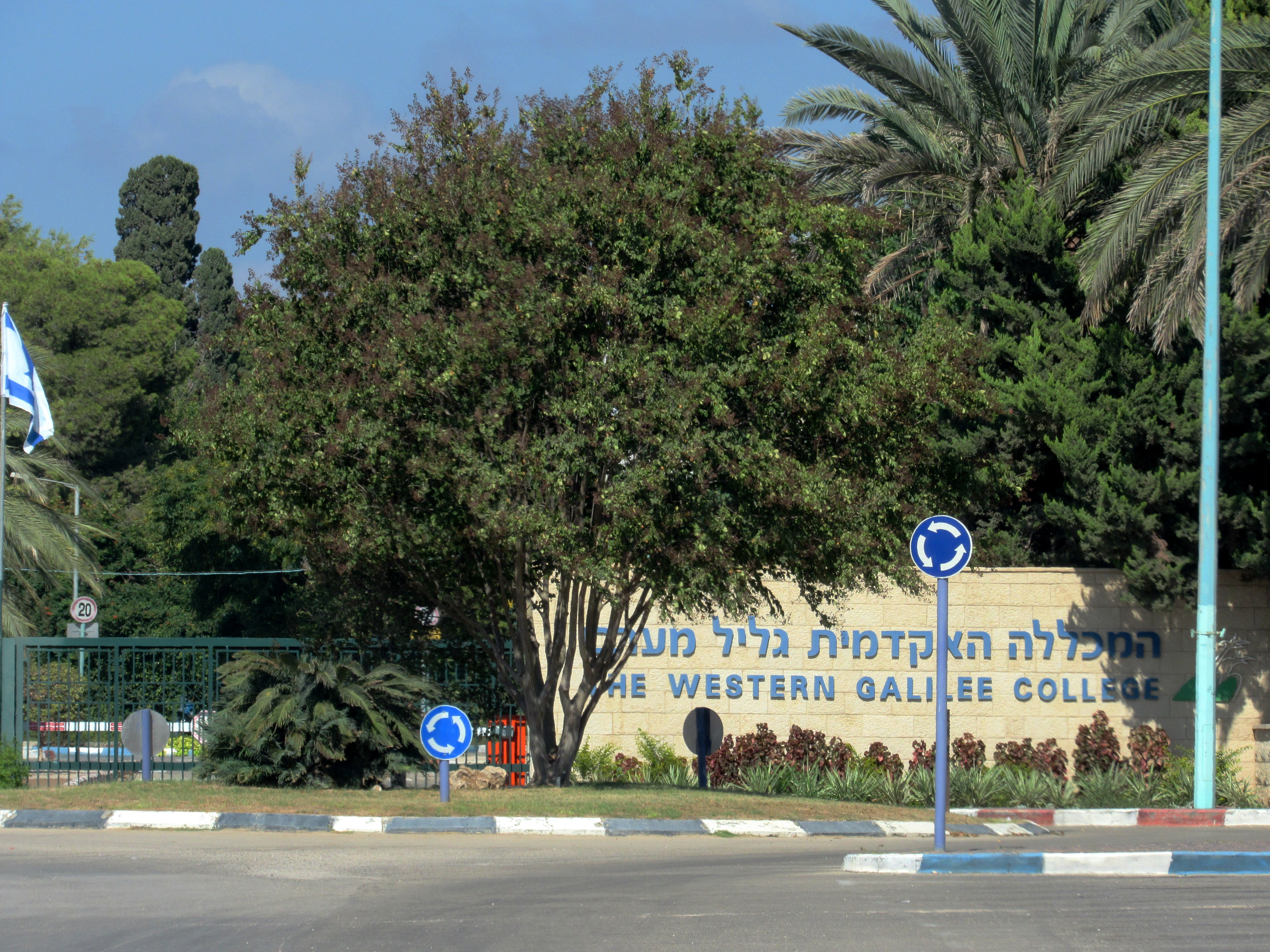
- Type: Academic College
- Established: 1994
- Location: Akko, Western Galilee, Israel; 32°56′12″N 35°05′11″E
- Website: www.wgalil.ac.il

Western Galilee College (Hebrew: המכללה האקדמית גליל מערבי) is an academic college in northern Israel within the jurisdiction of the city of Akko. It was founded in 1994 on the basis of its predecessor, the Western Galilee Regional College, which was founded in 1972.

== See also ==
- List of universities and colleges in Israel
