= Moshe Novomeysky =

Israeli scientist (1873–1961)

- משה נובומייסקי
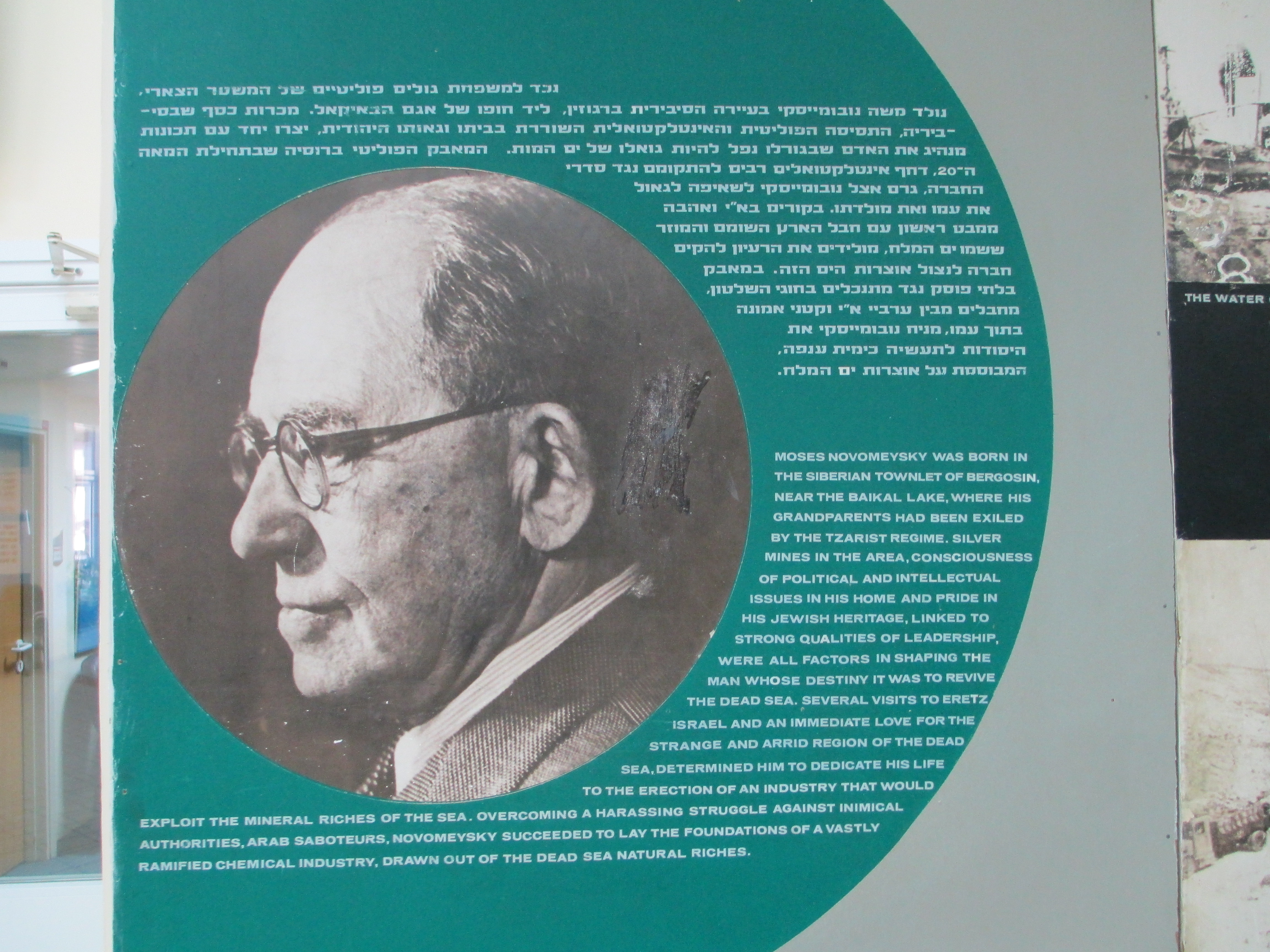
- Born: 25 November 1873; Barguzin, Russian Empire
- Died: 27 March 1961 (aged 87)
- Resting place: Trumpeldor Cemetery
- Occupation(s): Founder of the Palestine Potash Company, businessman, mining engineer
- Known for: The first survey of the Dead Sea

Moshe Novomeysky (Hebrew: משה נובומייסקי, Russian: Моисей Абрамович Новомейский; 25 November 1873 – 27 March 1961) was an Israeli businessman and mining engineer. He was an early developer of the Palestine Potash Company, precursor to the Dead Sea Works.

== Biography ==
Mikhail (Moses) Novomeysky was born in 1873 in the Siberian village of Barguzin. Following his father, he developed an interest in mining. He graduated Irkutsk Technical School, then studied mining engineering in Royal Prussian Königsberg University, graduating in 1897 and returning to Barguzin. Unlike fellow mining scientists, Novomeysky looked towards Lake Baikal as a source of minerals and researched ways to extract them from bodies of water, and was among the pioneers of mining in Siberia. In 1900, he built a chemical factory that supplied local glassworks with refined salts.

Novomeysky came from a family tradition of political activism. His grandfather was exiled from Poland to Siberia in 1831 on the charge of aiding Polish rebels in an uprising. Initially a Social Revolutionary, he moved towards the Social Democrats. Upset by their views on nationalities, Novomeysky discovered Zionism and attended the 1903 Zionist Congress in Basel, Switzerland. This resulted in his 1905 imprisonment for "revolutionary activity." He was released after five months.

Novomeysky went on to become a prominent figure in Jewish community. He chaired "National Council of Jews in Siberia" and headed Siberian Zionist Center in 1914–1920. He was treasurer for Haganah in 1921–1922.

== Dead Sea development ==
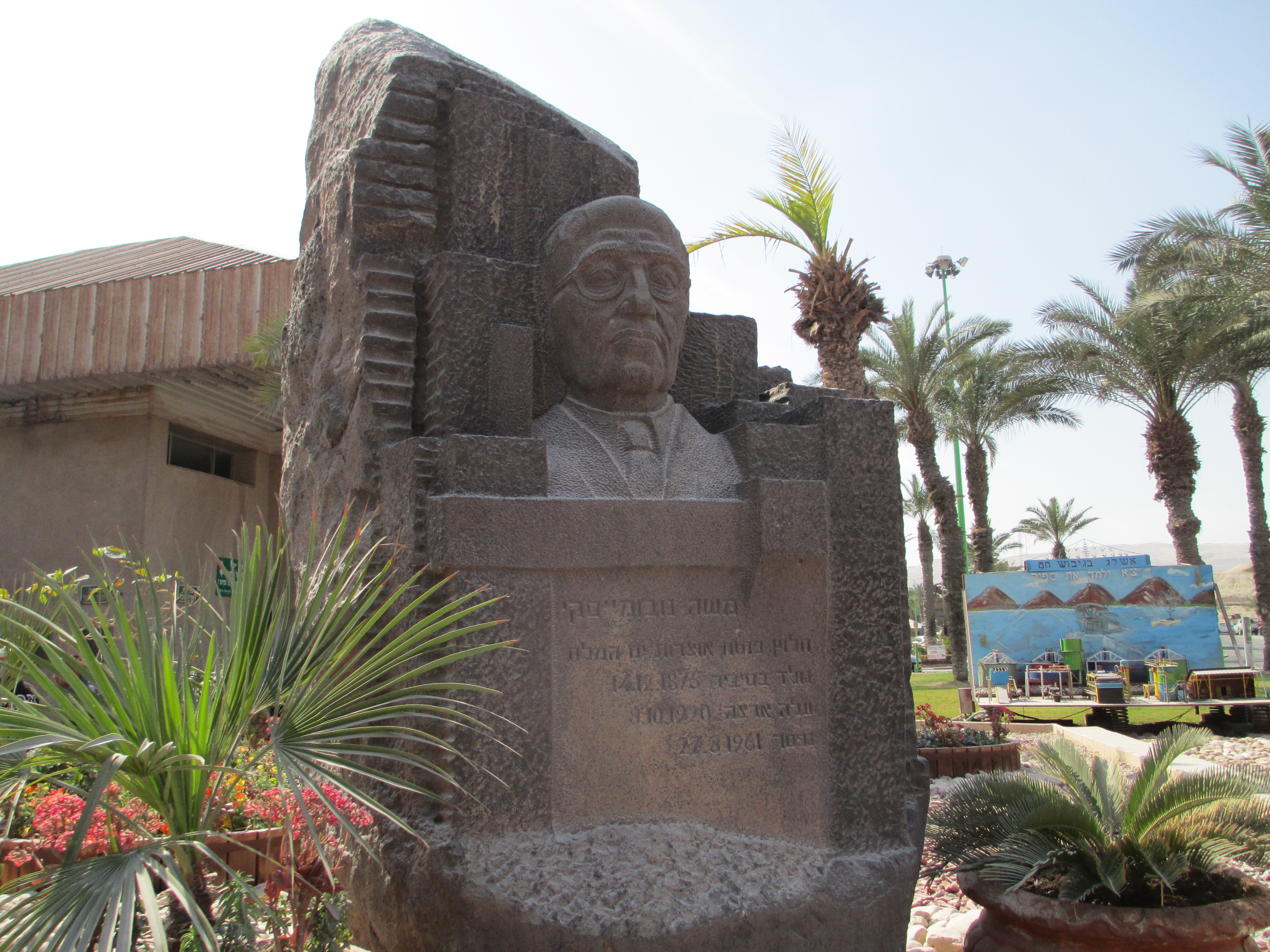
Monument commemorating Moshe Novomeysky at Dead Sea Works

Novomeysky's interest in the Dead Sea can be traced back to his meeting with fellow scientist and Zionist Otto Warburg in 1906, who introduced him to a report about the Dead Sea by German geologist Max Blankenhorn. He discerned similarities between its chemical composition and those of the Siberian lakes. In 1907, he applied to the Ottoman Turkish authorities for permission to extract salts from the Dead Sea.

In 1911, he visited the Dead Sea for the first time. With a climate that was the polar opposite of his birthplace, he wrote, "This was something of quite a different order from anything I had known." He then set about testing the Dead Sea's specific gravity, water and air temperatures, and the practicality of constructing evaporation pans. He then returned to Siberia.

In 1920, Novomeysky immigrated to Mandate Palestine and began using his Hebrew name, Moshe. He settled his family in Gedera, near Tel Aviv, and purchased some land on the Dead Sea's northern shore, near Jericho. Towards the end of 1922 he purchased rights to mine salt at Mount Sodom and sail on the sea from a Bethlehem Arab, along with some disused huts on the northern shore. He continued his pursuits by founding a company, "Jordan", to search for oil. In 1924 he founded the Palestine Mining Syndicate, and conducted more geological surveys of the Dead Sea with the British geologist George Stanfield Blake.

In 1925, the High Commissioner for Palestine granted him permission to continue the surveys. In April, he sent the manager of his plant in Hadera, Moshe Langutzky, to conduct research on the northern shore. Langutzky spent two years observing, surveying, and running early attempts at potash exploitation, all on his own.

=== Palestine Potash Company ===
British Mandatory authorities subsequently issued a tender for mining the Dead Sea area. Many groups applied; Novomeysky's consortium included a Scotsman named Thomas Gregorie Tulloch who had sought permission to mine there as early as the beginning of the British rule in 1918. After beating fierce competition from American firms for the right to mine around the Dead Sea, the application was officially accepted by High Commissioner Herbert Plumer in 1927. This triggered a debate in the British Parliament, revealing the anti-Semitic and anti-Zionist feelings of some MPs. In this debate, a member of the House of Lords, Islington, described Zionism as an "unfortunate experiment".

Gathering support among well-known Londoners, Novomeysky was eventually granted a seventy-five year concession in August 1929 to his Palestine Potash Company, but only after providing documentation of his funding and accepting that the company be run by a Briton. The company's board of directors and marketing departments were located in London, their management and research laboratories in Jerusalem, the primary production facility on the northern shore of the Dead Sea, and experimental production at the Mount Sodom site. Most of the workers were employed at the northern shore campus and commuted from Jerusalem. British authorities would not allow the Jews to establish villages on nearby government land, but Novomeysky was ultimately granted permission to build a workers' neighbourhood on the basis of his concession. Marshland near the potash plant was drained, and a neighbourhood named Kalia was begun in 1934, which eventually built community institutions and was planned on the community settlement model.

Seeing potential for the Dead Sea as a vacation place, the British authorities had installed a golf course in Kalia named Sodom and Gomorrah.

Potash production was based on extremely large evaporation pans, while the northern shore plot was relatively small. Novomeysky felt the limitations in 1933 when he approached kibbutz Ramat Rachel about organising a labour group to expand operations at the expansive Mount Sodom site; while the northern shore had difficult conditions, the southern site was far harsher due to its isolation from civilisation in the heart of the Judean Desert combined with that region's arid climate. Ramat Rachel contacted the United Kibbutz Movement, which organised a group of 20 who in 1934 travelled to Mount Sodom along with Palestine Potash workers to establish a work camp. Materials arrived from Jerusalem, and water was purchased from King Abdullah.

The group found a good site for building residences in the nearby Zoar valley and was joined by a workers group from Ra'anana. However the area was now allotted to Abdullah's Emirate of Transjordan, and the group was evacuated following his protests. Despite this, on 8 October 1939, at the start of the Second World War, the group was able to set up a kibbutz near Kalia called Beit HaArava, which facilitated successful experiments in raising crops on hypersaline soil. Novomeysky received permission despite the British White Paper of 1939, which sought to restrict further Jewish immigration into Palestine and prevent new settlements from being built, because the kibbutz was a residence for his workers. By 1943, 100 Jewish families were living in Beit HaArava, which boasted fish ponds, eucalyptus, cypress, pines, and flowers.

By 1940 the Palestine Potash Company was responsible for half of the country's industrial export, and it supplied half of Britain's demand during World War II. In 1946 Novomeysky founded a fertiliser and chemicals company.

=== 1948 Arab-Israeli War ===
Building a good relationship with the local Arab population was important to Novomeysky. He mastered the Arabic language and was known to locals as "the doctor." Novomeysky had also maintained ties with King Abdullah I of Jordan, whose Emirate, now a country, lay just across the Jordan River from the northern shore concession.

Due to Novomeysky's reputation, the kibbutzim were spared from the anti-Jewish riots of 1936-39. Many of its Arab labourers hailed from nearby Jericho.

From 18 April 1948, the British ceased escorting convoys from Jerusalem to the northern shore facilities. As the prospect of war between the Arabs and the Zionists increased at the close of the British Mandate, Novomeysky tried to foster peace with Abdullah, attempting to strike a deal that would spare the potash works due to their value to both sides as well as the British. Having twice flown to Amman for negotiations, on 13 May 1948 an agreement was reached with the Transjordanian delegation whereby a neutral zone would be created to protect the facilities. He travelled to Tel Aviv on 14 May in order to share these results with David Ben-Gurion, the Zionist leader and soon Prime Minister of Israel.

Ben-Gurion couldn't immediately meet him due to preparations for Israel's Declaration of Independence, and when Moshe Novomeysky was injured in an automobile accident, he was unable to attend to finalising the understandings. On 17 May, representatives of the Palestine Potash Company and the Haganah signed an agreement putting both northern and southern facilities under Transjordanian custody, in contradiction to the previous agreements. The Haganah command rejected the new agreement as well, but due to his hospitalisation, Novomeysky was unable to use his Transjordanian contacts to remedy the situation.

As other Jewish settlements in Arab-controlled areas were subject to massacres, the residents of Kalia grew apprehensive. After the Naharayim power plant, which straddles the Jordan River, had its Jewish employees taken prisoner by the Jordanians, the mistrust grew. Ben-Gurion ultimately ordered Kalia and Beit HaAravah evacuated, and on 19 and 20 May 1948 hundreds of workers, kibbutz members, and the Palmach security contingent fled on a "fleet" of 17 small boats to the Mount Sodom complex, having sabotaged the factory's equipment to prevent the now enemy from using them. Abdullah's Arab Legion entered the site, which had already been vandalised by locals, on 22 May, and completely destroyed both the potash facilities and the kibbutzim.

== After the establishment of the state ==
In November 1948, Israel's provisional government appointed a commission to examine the Palestine Potash Company's operations and determine what action, if any, the government should take. The Yishuv's attitudes towards the company were mixed, on the one hand recognising its important contributions to the economy, and on the other hostile to its British directors. The commission acted to expel the British interests and to modify the concession's terms. At the same time, Novomeysky, 75 years of age, was forced out. Following the commission's recommendations, conditions were set to allow continued operation of the company, which were not met.

In 1952, the State of Israel established the Dead Sea Works Ltd. as a state-owned enterprise, acquiring all the property of the Palestine Potash Company. In the face of decreasing productivity, Mordechai Maklef was appointed director, who turned the company around and improved its operations.

Novomeysky maintained contact with Abdullah, in hope of restoring his business. In 1957, the Technion awarded Novomeysky an honorary doctorate in the technical sciences. He died in 1961 at the age of 87, and was buried in Tel Aviv's Trumpeldor Cemetery.

== See also ==
- Economy of Israel
