= Dead Sea Works =

Israeli potash plant in Sodom

Coordinates: 31.0347°N 35.3711°E

- Native name: מפעלי ים המלח
- Company type: Public
- Industry: Chemicals & Extraction of Minerals
- Founded: 1929
- Products: Potash, Bromine, Magnesium
- Owner: Israel Chemicals
- Website: www.Iclfertilizers.com

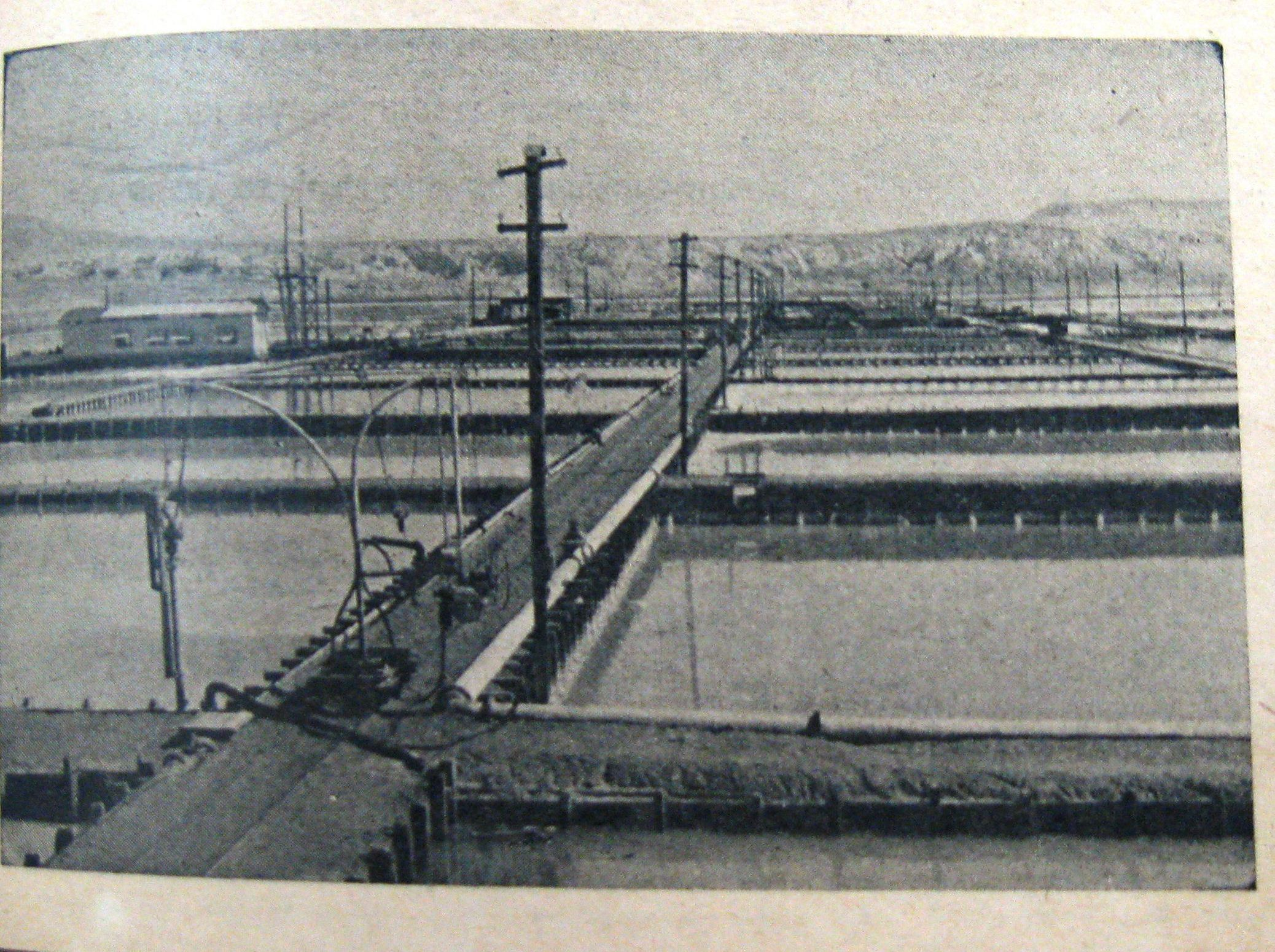
Palestine Potash Ltd., 1945

The Dead Sea Works (Hebrew: מפעלי ים המלח, Mif'alei Yam HaMelakh) is an Israeli potash plant in Sodom, on the Dead Sea coast of Israel. Originally known as the Palestine Potash Concession, it operated from two sites during the Mandatory Palestine period - Kalya in the north and Sodom in the south.

== History ==
Under the British administration, concessions from the Mandatory government were given. On January 1, 1930, the "Concession for the extraction of salts and minerals in the Dead Sea" was granted to Palestine Potash Limited by the governments of Palestine and Transjordan jointly. The company, whose directors included Moshe Novomeysky, had been incorporated in England in 1929 and registered as a foreign company in Palestine in 1930. From 1936, it was a profitable enterprise despite attempts by the German potash cartel to strangle the business by dumping potash at below-cost prices.

In the 1948 Arab–Israeli War, the northern half of the production facilities was occupied by the Jordanian Legion, which was destroyed in the ensuing fighting.

In 1951, the company was nationalized by the Israeli government under the Ministry of Development. In 1953, it was renamed the Dead Sea Works.

== Today ==
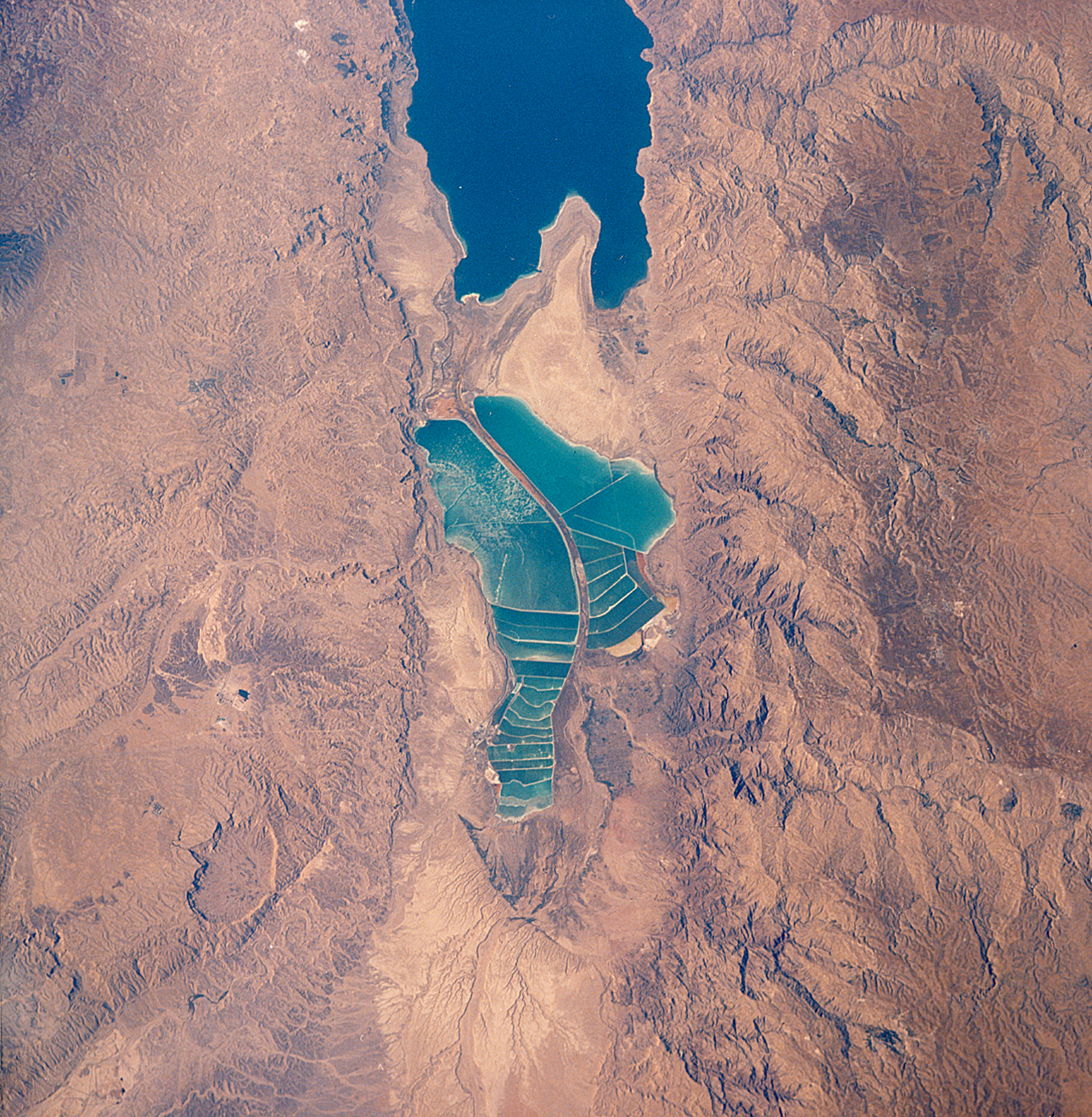
An aerial view of the evaporation ponds operated by the Dead Sea Works

Dead Sea Works is the world's fourth-largest producer and supplier of potash products. The company also produces magnesium chloride, industrial salts, de-icers, bath salts, table salt, and raw materials for the cosmetic industry. It has customers in over 60 countries. Dead Sea Works is part of the Fertilizers Division of Israel Chemicals Ltd. It is located in the southern basin of the Dead Sea and the extracted chemicals are exported around the world.

Rather than extracting potash and other minerals from the Dead Sea by mining them directly, the company makes use of solar evaporation with 2-meter deep evaporation ponds.

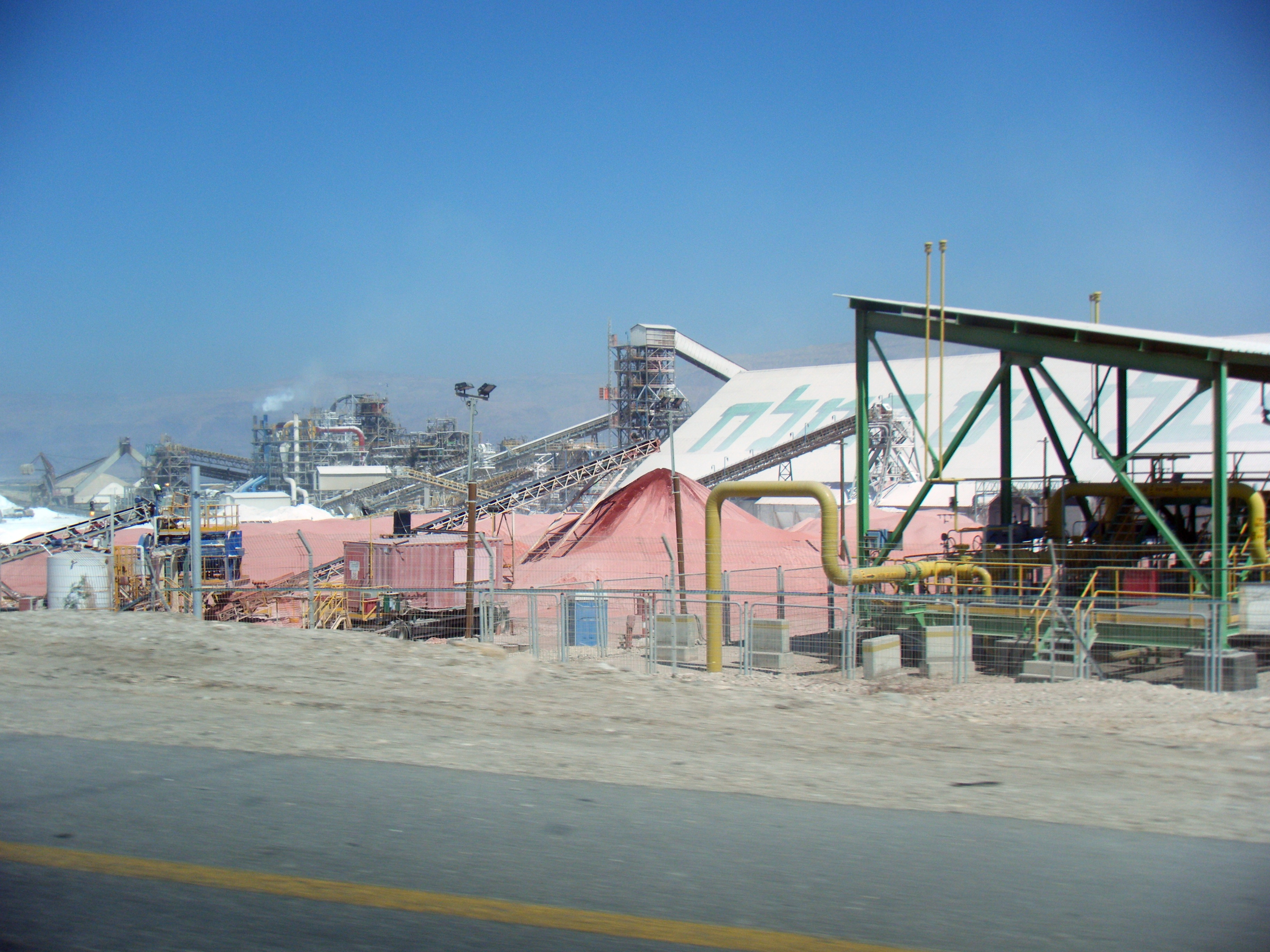
Part of the Dead Sea Works.

== See also ==
- Arab Potash
- Economy of Israel
- Ahava
