= Evaporation pond =

Artificial pond

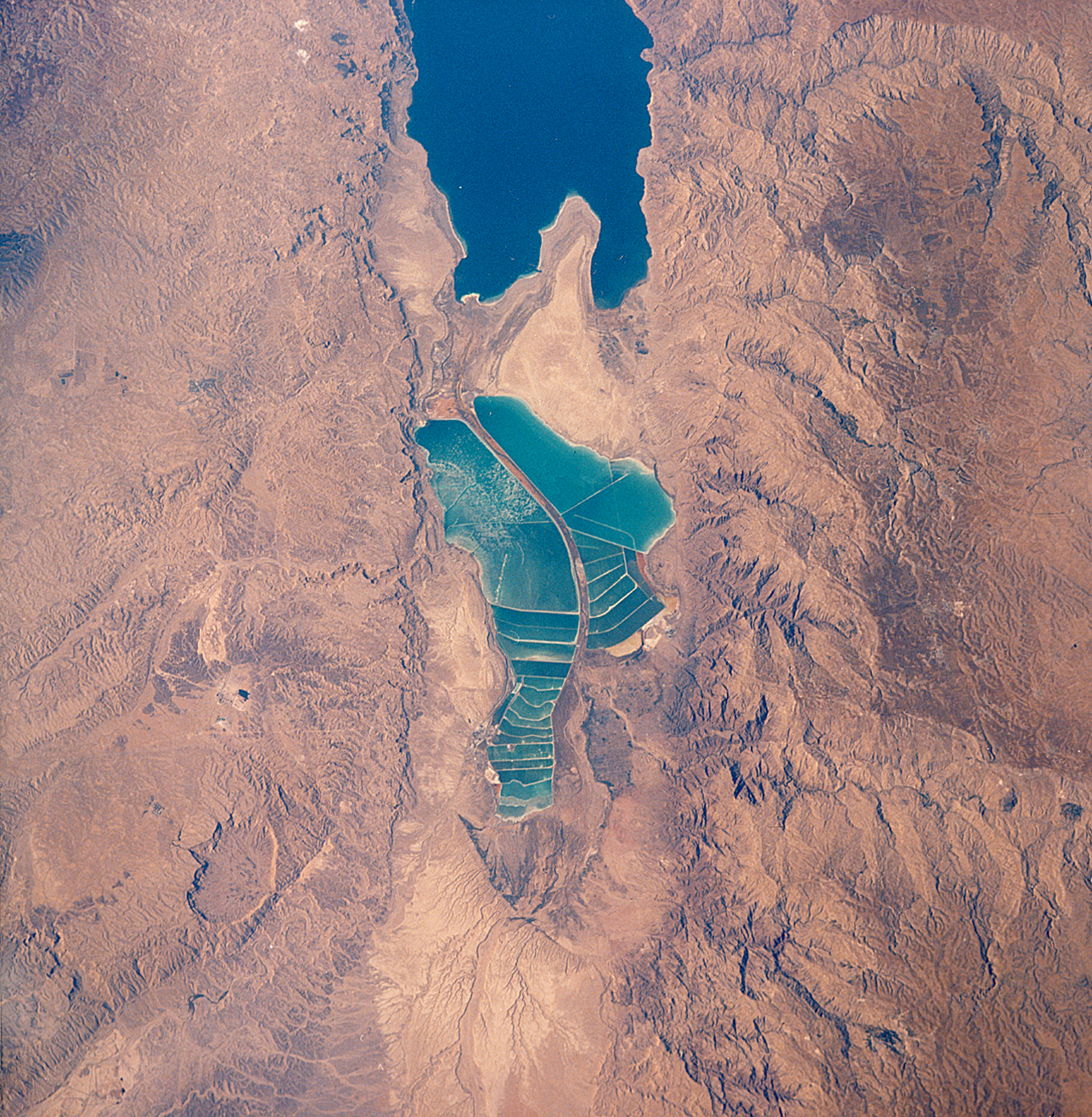
An aerial view of the evaporation ponds to the south of the Dead Sea operated by the Dead Sea Works

Evaporation ponds are artificial ponds with very large surface areas that are designed to efficiently evaporate water by sunlight and expose water to the ambient temperatures. Evaporation ponds are inexpensive to design making them ideal for multiple purposes such as wastewater treatment processes, storage, and extraction of minerals. Evaporation ponds differ in purpose and may result in a wide range of environmental and health effects.

== Uses ==
=== Extraction ===
Salt evaporation ponds produce salt from seawater. Evaporation ponds are used to extract lithium from underground brine solution. The extracted Lithium is then used to make ion batteries. Mines use them to separate ore from water. The ore can be sold for use in different industries. Potash evaporation ponds are used to extract potassium from the mineral rich solution. The potassium extracted is used for products like fertilizer.

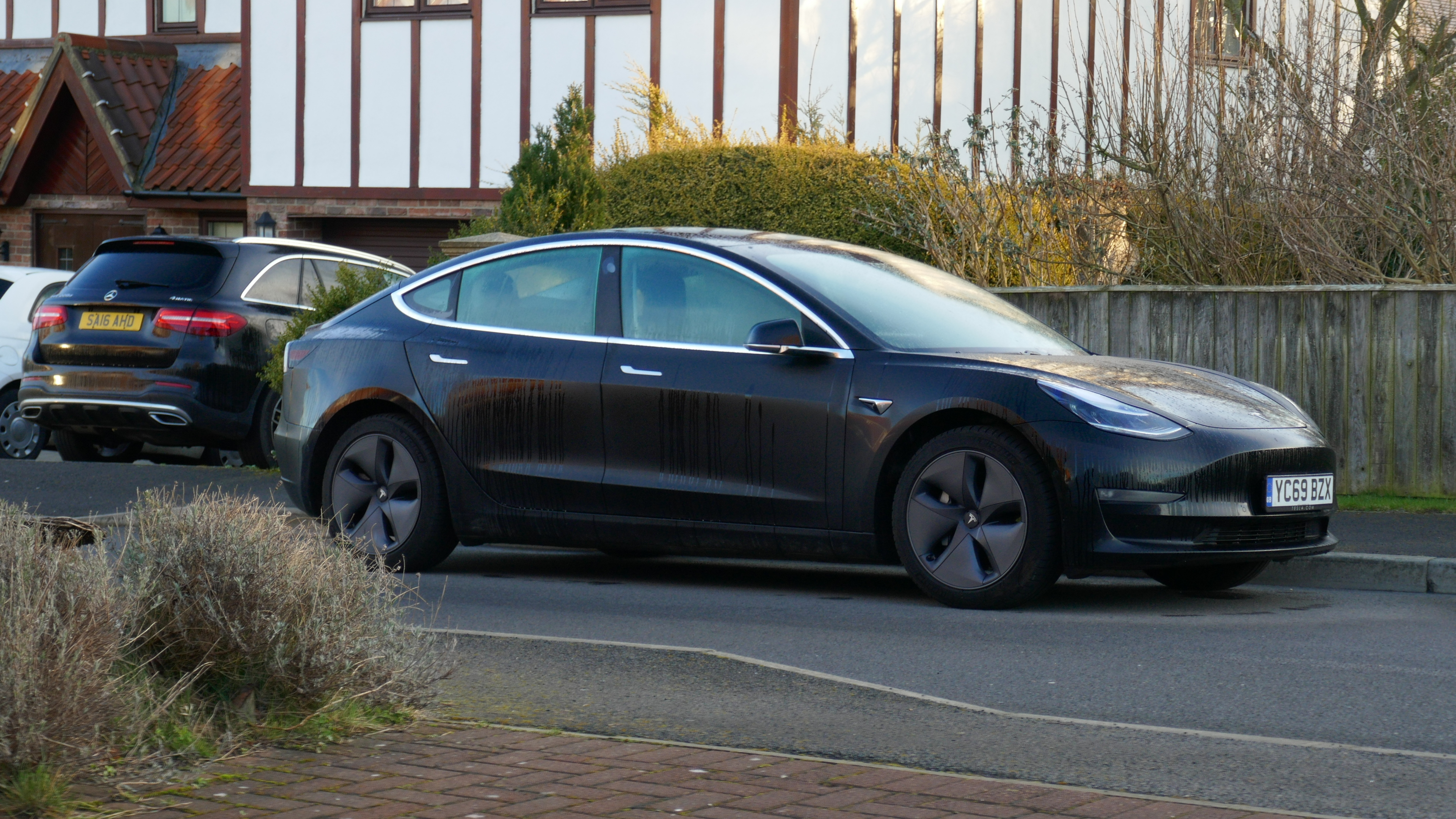
Image shows Tesla car which uses lithium-ion batteries

=== Storage ===
Evaporation ponds are also used to dispose of brine from desalination plants. Evaporation ponds at contaminated sites remove the water from hazardous waste, which reduces its weight and volume and allows it to be more easily transported and stored. Evaporation ponds are used to prevent run off agricultural wastewater contaminants like pesticides, fertilizers and salts from entering bodies of water they would normally flow into.

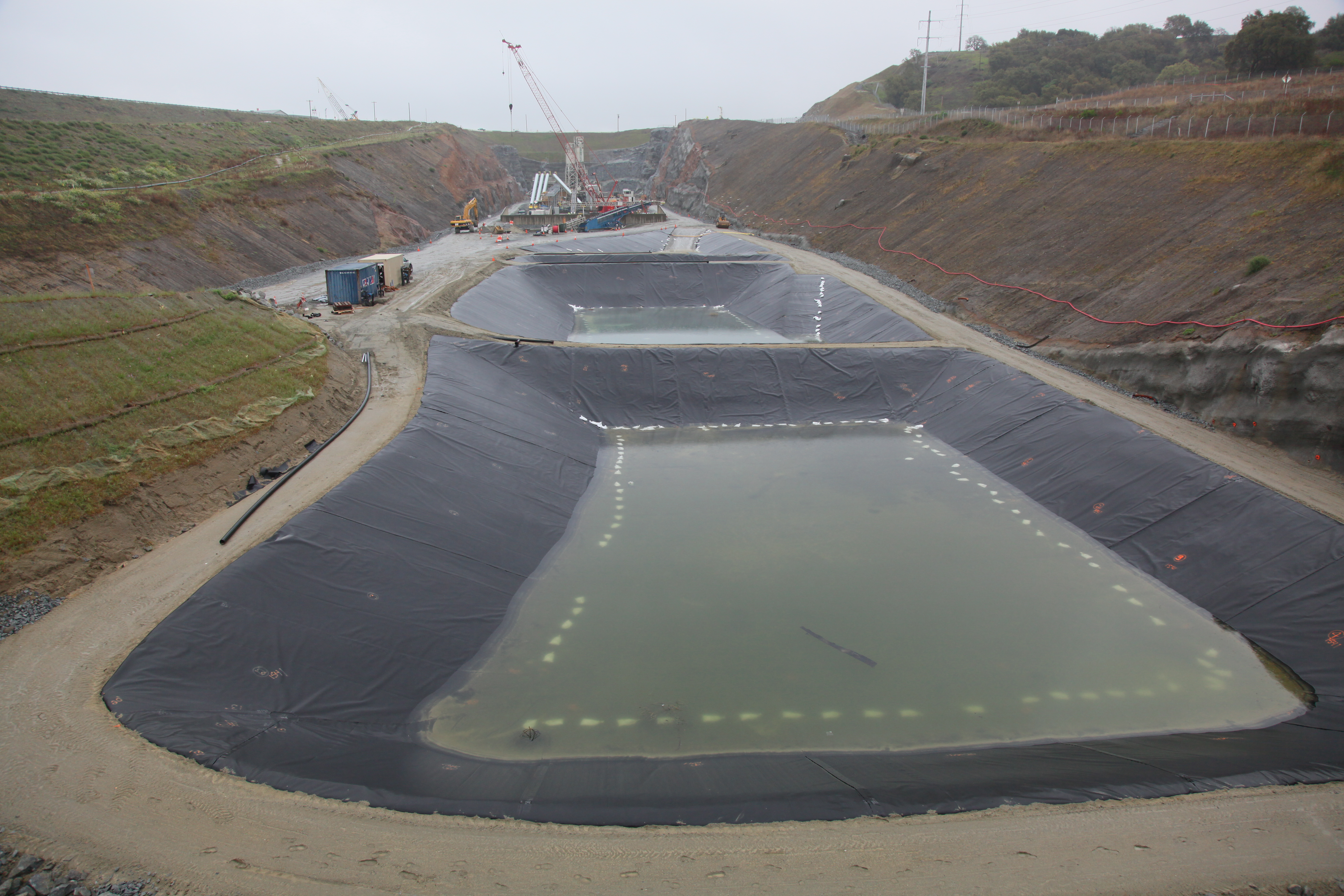
Image shows storage of runoff waste water in treatment ponds

== Design and operation ==
Location of the evaporation pond should be considered for optimal results. Evaporation will be higher in places with high amounts of solar radiation, high temperatures, and high wind levels. Since evaporation ponds operate best with greater surface area of evaporation, large amount of land is required, so low quality, low cost land is better A shallow pond covering greater surface area will result in faster rates of evaporation.

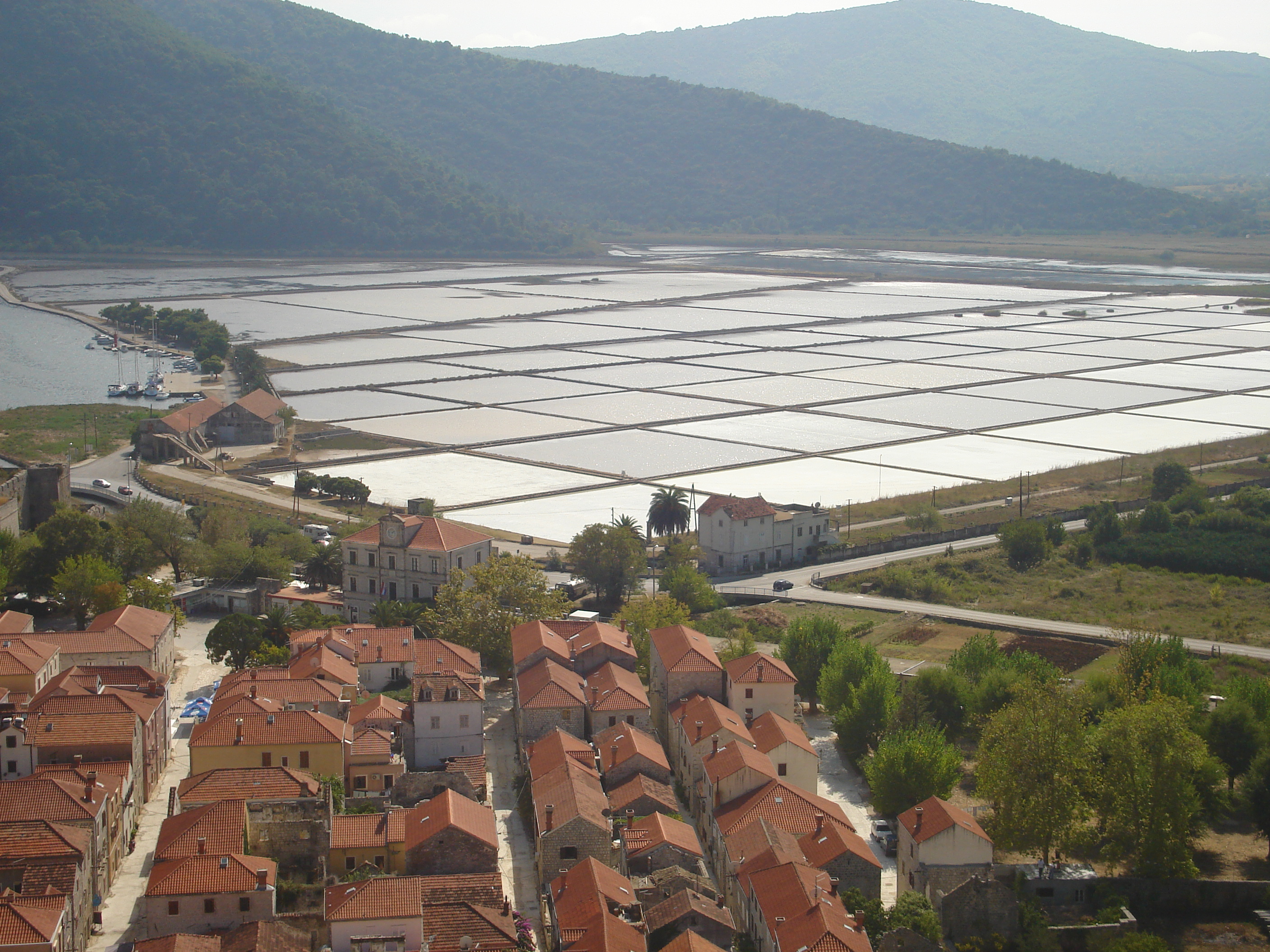
A view of evaporation ponds that are designed to extend for miles of land

An evaporation pond has shallow depths and, to prevent contamination of the environment from its content, a range of pond liners are used, categorized as geomembrane, constructed bentonite clay, or natural clay. Each pond liner is prone to leakage and requires regular maintenance. The contents of the evaporation pond depend on the use, the evaporation pond will contain water and the desired contents hoping to be extracted. The desired contents range from waste to minerals, and the remaining contents are either stored or extracted.

== Health impacts ==
Evaporation ponds, when not maintained, may leak contaminated contents into the environment which directly effect human and animal health. The contents within the evaporation pond can be found to contaminate surrounding soil and surrounding water sources. Contaminated water can contain sources of chemicals and hard metals like selenium which in accumulation can be toxic when ingested by humans or animals. Employees working directly with the evaporation ponds may experience acute health conditions like dry skin and irritation from close contact of contents within the pond.

== Environmental impacts ==
Evaporation ponds pose a threat to environmental sustainability because resources like water, land, and minerals are rapidly used at large scales. These resources are limited in nature. An increasing demand for extracted products and treated wastewater will result in evaporation ponds expanding and related issues worsening until the depletion of these resources. Evaporation ponds are found to increase green house gas emissions and therefore contribute to environmental issues like warming of the planet and ocean acidification. As the pond evaporates, it carries with it volatile pollutants into the air.

== Technology ==
Advancing technology has made evaporation pond design and implementation more effective. With new resources such as fabric evaporations for salt-tolerant plants, the ponds' costs and environmental impacts can be mediated.

== See also ==
- Seawater greenhouse
