= Dead Sea salt =

Salt extracted from the Dead Sea

Dead Sea salt refers to salt and other mineral deposits extracted or taken from the Dead Sea. The composition of this material differs significantly from oceanic salt.

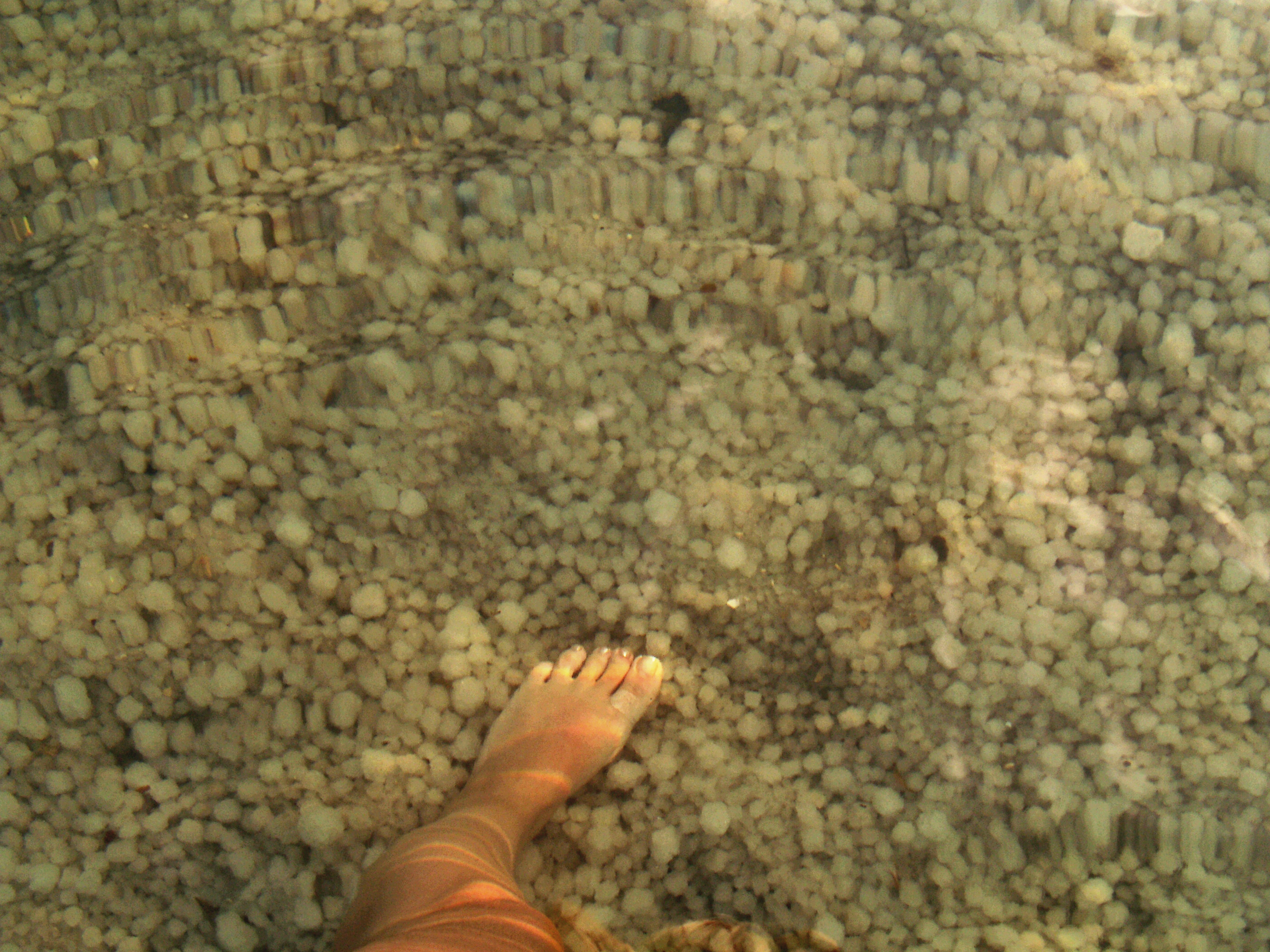
A bunch of semi-spherical crystals of Dead Sea salt at the bottom of the sea near a beach

== History ==
Dead Sea salt was used by the peoples of Ancient Egypt and it has been utilized in various unguents, skin creams, and soaps since then.

== Mineral composition ==
The Dead Sea's mineral composition varies with season, rainfall, depth of deposit, and ambient temperature. Most oceanic salt is approximately 85 wt.% sodium chloride (the same salt as table salt) while Dead Sea salt is only 30.5 wt.% of this, with the remainder composed of other dried minerals and salts. The extreme salinity of the Dead Sea is due to rapid evaporation and the absence of an outlet, leading to a high concentration of minerals such as magnesium, sodium, and potassium. These minerals are continuously deposited as water evaporates, making the Dead Sea one of the saltiest bodies of water on Earth. The concentrations of the major ions present in the Dead Sea water are given in the following table:

Major ions present in the Dead Sea water
Ion	Concentration (g/L)
Chloride and Bromide	230.4
Magnesium	45.9
Sodium	36.6
Calcium	17.6
Potassium	7.8

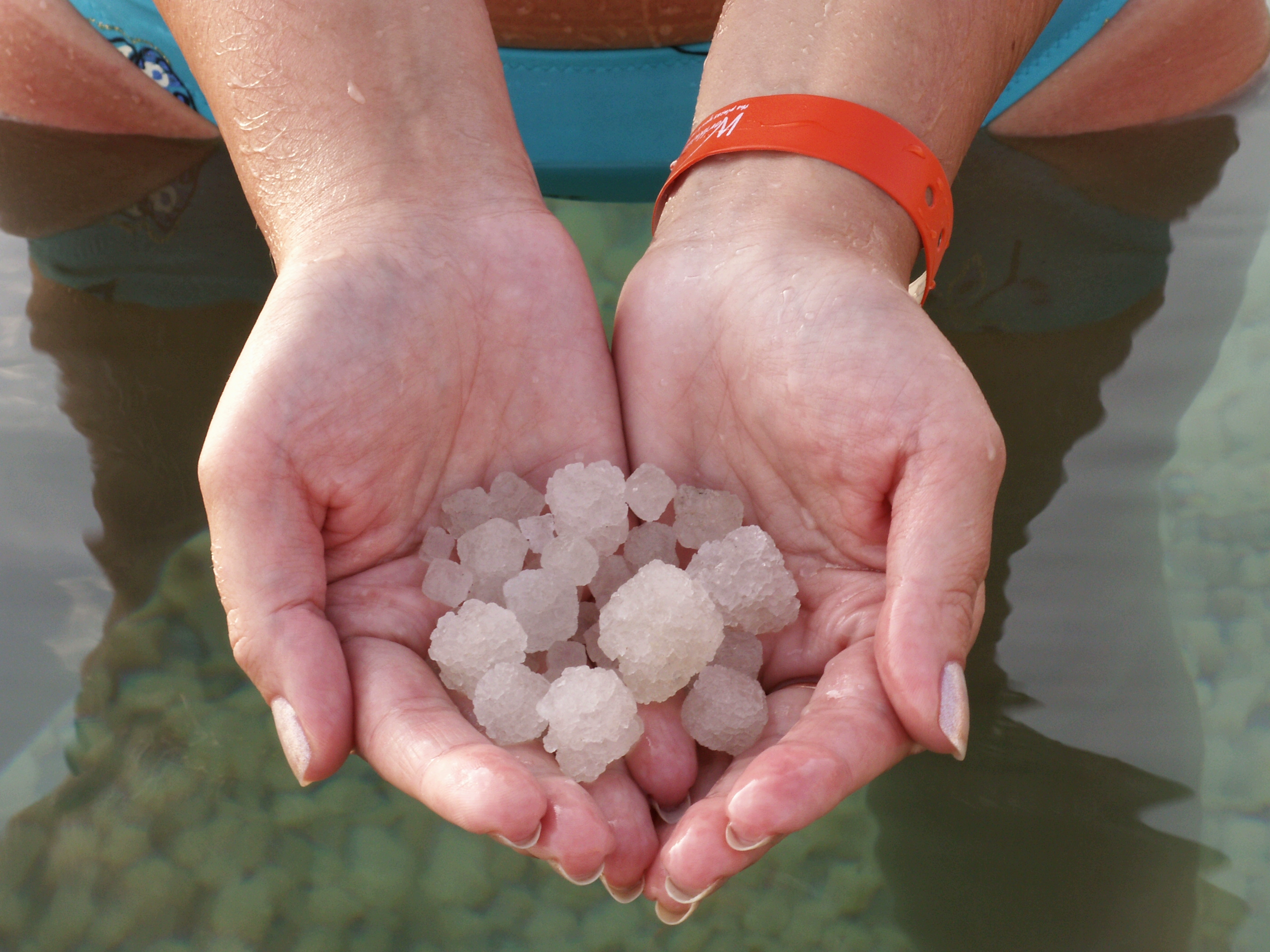
A handful of Dead Sea salt

The chemical composition of the crystallized Dead Sea salts does not necessarily correspond to the results presented in this table because of composition changes due to the process of fractional crystallization.

The main detritic minerals present in the Dead Sea mud were carried by runoff streams flowing into the Dead Sea. They constituted large mud deposits intermixed with salt layers during the Holocene era. Their elemental composition expressed as equivalent oxides (except for Cl^{–} and Br^{–}) is given here below:

Elemental composition of detritic minerals present in the Dead Sea mud
Mineral*	Content (wt. %)
Silicon dioxide	20
Calcium oxide	15.5
Aluminum oxide	4.8
Magnesium oxide	4.5
Iron(III) oxide	2.8
Sodium oxide	1.7
Potassium oxide	1.3
Titanium(IV) oxide	0.5
Sulfur trioxide	0.4
Phosphorus pentoxide	0.3
Chloride	6.7
Bromide	0.2

Except for chloride and bromide, the results of the elemental composition of the Dead Sea mud given here above are presented as equivalent oxides for the sake of convenience. To illustrate this chemical convention, the neutral sodium sulfate (Na_{2}SO_{4}) is reported here as basic sodium oxide (Na_{2}O) and acidic sulfur trioxide (SO_{3}), neither of which can naturally occur under these free forms in this mud. However, one will note that the elemental composition given here above is incomplete as a major component is lacking in this table: carbon dioxide (CO_{2}) accounting for the significant carbonate fraction present in this mud.

== Therapeutic benefits ==
Dead Sea salts have been claimed to treat the following conditions:

=== Rheumatologic conditions ===
Rheumatologic conditions can be treated in the balneotherapy of rheumatoid arthritis, psoriatic arthritis, and osteoarthritis. The minerals are absorbed while soaking, stimulating blood circulation.

=== Common skin ailments ===
Skin disorders such as acne and psoriasis may be relieved by regularly soaking the affected area in water with added Dead Sea salt. The National Psoriasis Foundation recommends Dead Sea and Dead Sea salts as effective treatments for psoriasis. High concentration of magnesium in Dead Sea salt may be helpful in improving skin hydration and reducing inflammation, although Epsom salt is a much less expensive salt that also contains high amounts of magnesium and therefore may be equally as useful for this purpose.

=== Allergies ===
The high concentration of bromide and magnesium in the Dead Sea salt may help relieve allergic reactions of the skin by reducing inflammation.

=== Skin ageing ===
Dead Sea salt may reduce the depth of skin wrinkling, a form of skin ageing.

== See also ==
- Tourism in the Palestinian territories
- Tourism in Jordan
- Tourism in Israel
- Medical tourism in Israel
