= Georgian inscriptions =

Georgian inscriptions may refer to:

- Bir el Qutt inscriptions (AD 430)
- Bolnisi inscriptions (AD 494)
- Greco-Georgian mosaic of Mount Zion (5th century)
- Umm Leisun inscription (5th-6th centuries)
- Jvari inscriptions (AD 595-605)
- Stele of Davati (6th century)
- Georgian graffiti of Nazareth and Sinai (7th-9th centuries)
- Samshvilde Sioni inscription (8th-10th centuries)
- Georgian graffito of Nessana (9th-10th centuries)
- Ateni Theotokos Church inscription (AD 982–989)
- Bedia Chalice inscription (AD 999)
- Doliskana inscriptions (10th century)
