= Epitaph of Samuel =

Ancient Greek limestone tombstone slab epitaph inscription

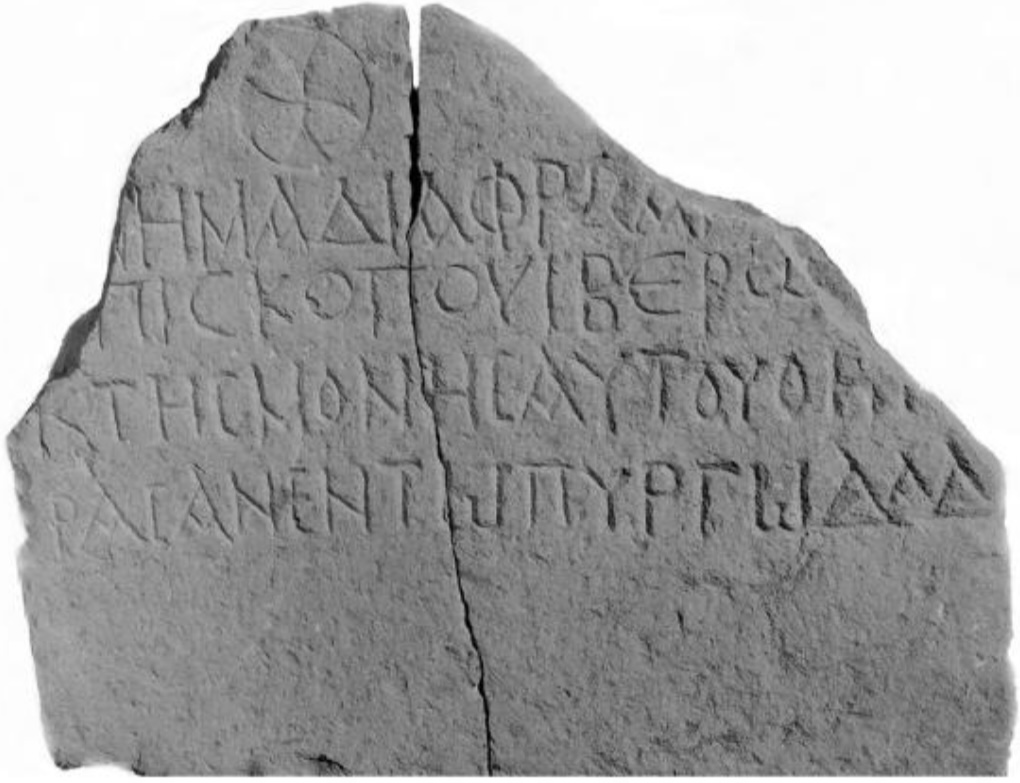
- Material: Limestone
- Writing: Greek script
- Created: 5th-6th century
- Discovered: 1934
- Present location: Rockefeller Museum, Jerusalem
- Language: Ancient Greek

The Epitaph of Samuel (Georgian: სამუელის ეპიტაფია, romanized: samuelis ep'it'apia) is an Ancient Greek limestone tombstone slab epitaph inscription which was discovered in 1934, in the monastic cemetery of the Byzantine period, at the YMCA area in Jerusalem.

The inscription mentions "Iberian [i.e. Georgian] bishop, Samuel" and the purchase of a tomb or a monastery in the area of Tower of David. Because of the incorrect Greek, it is unclear if the Iberians bought a tomb or a monastery. It is assumed the church belonged to the Iberian clergy and possibly served the whole Georgian monastic community of Jerusalem. It may have been a cemeterial church, extremely rare in Palestine of Byzantine period, and completely absent in ancient Georgia. The slab is partly broken and the whole right corner of it is lost. It is dated to the late 5th or early 6th century AD. The inscription is kept at Rockefeller Museum.

== Inscription ==
ΝΗΜΑΔΙΑΦΡΣΑΜ
ΠΙΣΚΟΠΟΥΙΒΕΡΩ
ΚΤΗΣΜΟΝΗΣΑΥΤΟΥΟΗΓ
ΡΑΣΑΝΕΝΤΩΠΥΡΓΩΔΑΔ

nēmadiaphrsam
piskopouiberō
ktēsmonēsautouoēg
rasanentōpyrgōdad

Translation: Tomb belonging to Samuel, bishop of the Iberians, and to his monastery, which they bought in the area of Tower of David.

== See also ==
- Bir el Qutt inscriptions
- Umm Leisun inscription
- Georgian graffiti of Nazareth and Sinai
- Greco-Georgian mosaic of Mount Zion

== Bibliography ==
- Di Segni, L. & Tsafrir, Y. (2012) The Ethnic Composition of Jerusalem’s Population in the Byzantine Period (312-638 CE)
- Corpus Inscriptionum Iudaeae/Palaestinae (CIIP) (2012) Jerusalem, Part 2: 705-1120, by Hannah Cotton, Werner Eck, Benjamin Isaac etc. Walter de Gruyter
- Tchekhanovets, Y. (2014) Iohane, Bishop of Purtavi and Caucasian Albanians in the Holy Land
- Tchekhanovets, Y. (2018) The Caucasian Archaeology of the Holy Land: Armenian, Georgian and Albanian communities between the fourth and eleventh centuries CE, Brill Publishers
- Tchekhanovets, Y. (2017) The 1930s excavations at the YMCA site in Jerusalem and the Byzantine 'Monastery of the Iberians', Liber Annuus 67
