= Georgian graffito of Nessana =

Georgian inscription

- Writing: Georgian script
- Created: IX-X century
- Present location: graffito was lost
- Language: Old Georgian

The Georgian graffito of Nessana (Georgian: ნესანას ქართული გრაფიტი, romanized: nesanas kartuli grapit'i) was an Old Georgian pilgrim graffito inscription written in ancient Georgian Asomtavruli script, found in ancient site of Nessana, southwest Negev, on the Israeli–Egyptian border. The graffito was first documented by the British archaeologist P. L. O. Guy in 1926, mistakenly reporting it to be a Nabataean inscription. Byzantine-period Nessana settlement was located on the route of Christian pilgrims travelling from the Holy Land to Mount Sinai.

== Inscription ==
There are six graphemes in the graffito inscription and one letter cannot be identified. The graffito is dated to ninth–tenth centuries.

ႵႤ[...]ႸႤ[...]Ⴕ

ke[...]she[...]k

Translation: Christ have mercy upon K[...]

== See also ==
- Bir el Qutt inscriptions
- Georgian graffiti of Nazareth and Sinai
- Epitaph of Samuel

== Bibliography ==
- Yana Tchekhanovets & Temo Jojua (2024) Georgian Graffito from Nessana, Dating to the 'Dark Age' of Christianity in Palestine, Palestine Exploration Quarterly, DOI.org/10.1080/00310328.2024.2394375
- Ellen Bradshaw Aitken & John M. Fossey (2013) The Levant: Crossroads of late antiquity, Le Levant: Carrefour de L'Antiquité Tardive, Brill, ISBN 9789004258273, 9004258272
