= Names of Georgia =

Etymologies

Georgia (/ˈdʒɔːrdʒiə/ JOR-jiə) is the Western exonym for the country in the Caucasus natively known as Sakartvelo (Georgian: საქართველო [sakʰaɾtʰʷelo]). The Armenian exonym is Vrastan (Armenian: Վրաստան [vəɾɑsˈtɑn]); predominantly Muslim nations refer to it as Gurjistan or its many similar variations; while in mostly Slavic languages it is Gruziya and its derivatives.

The first mention of the name spelled as "Georgia" was recorded in Italian on the mappa mundi of Pietro Vesconte dated AD 1320. In early appearances in the Latin world, the name was not always written in the same transliteration, the first consonant originally being spelt with J, as Jorgia.

Both endonym and exonym for the country are derived from the same state-forming core and central Georgian region of Kartli (Georgian: ქართლი [ˈkʰaɾtʰli]; known as Iberia to the Classical and Byzantine sources) around which the early medieval cultural and political unity of the Georgians was formed.

All exonyms are likely derived from gorğān (گرگان), the Persian designation of the Georgians, evolving from Parthian wurğān (𐭅𐭓𐭊𐭍) and Middle Persian wiručān (𐭥𐭫𐭥𐭰𐭠𐭭), rooting out from Old Persian vrkān (𐎺𐎼𐎣𐎠𐎴) meaning "the land of the wolves". This is also reflected in Old Armenian virk (վիրք), it being a source of Ancient Greek ibēríā (Ἰβηρία), that entered Latin as Hiberia. The transformation of vrkān into gorğān and alteration of v into g was a phonetic phenomenon in the word formation of Proto-Aryan and ancient Iranian languages. All exonyms are simply phonetic variations of the same root vrk/varka (𐎺𐎼𐎣) meaning wolf.

The full, official name of the country is simply "Georgia", as specified in the Georgian constitution which reads "Georgia is the name of the state of Georgia." Before the 1995 constitution came into force the country's name was the Republic of Georgia. Since 2005 the Georgian Government has worked actively to remove the Russian-derived exonym Gruziya from usage around the world.

== Endonym ==
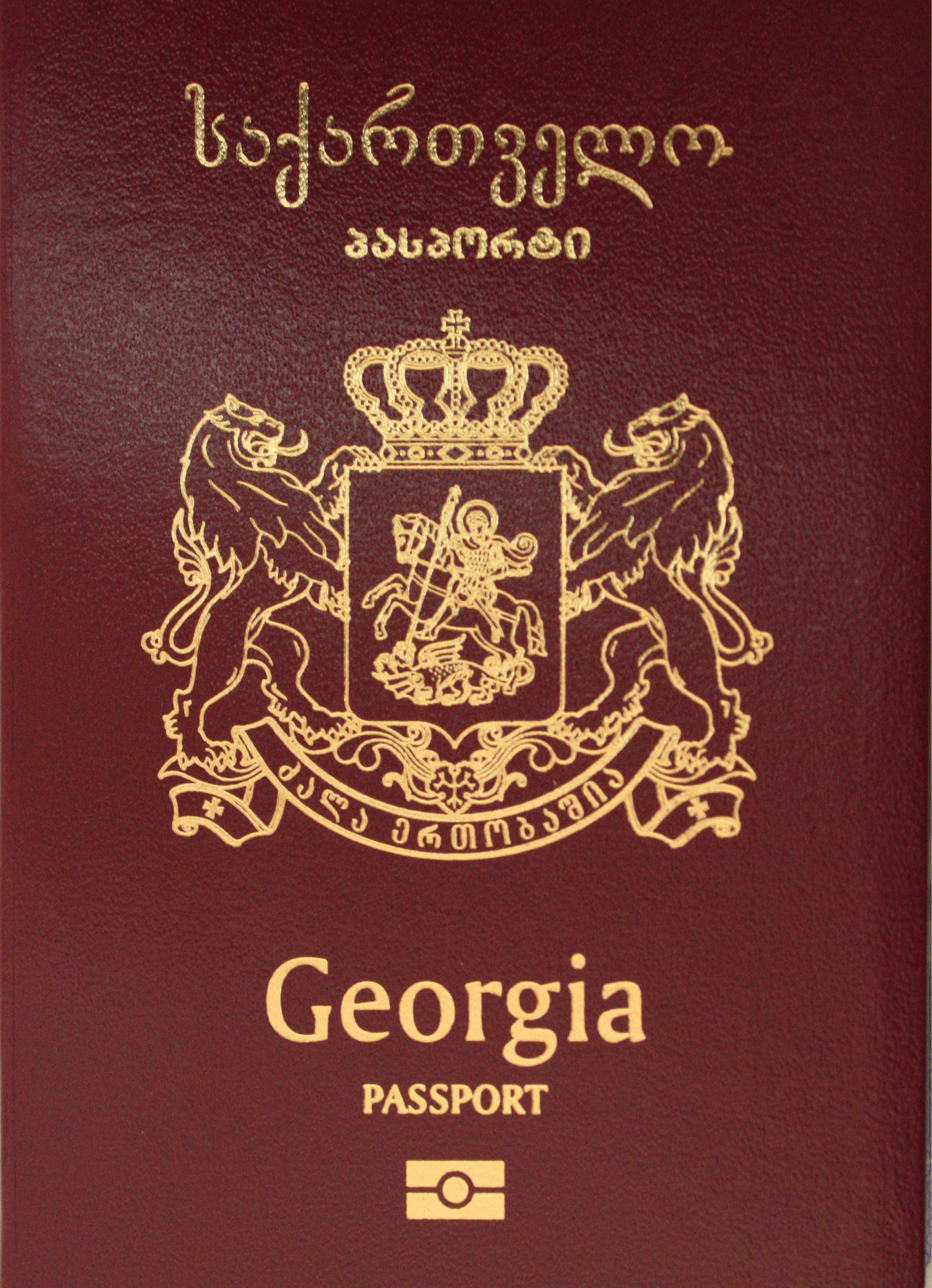
The front cover of a Georgian passport showing the official name of the country in Georgian as Sakartvelo and English as Georgia.

The native Georgian name for the country is Sakartvelo (საქართველო). The word consists of two parts. Its root, kartvel-i (ქართველ-ი), first attested in the Old Georgian inscription of Umm Leisun in Jerusalem, originally referred to an inhabitant of the core central Georgian region of Kartli – Iberia of the Classical and Byzantine sources. By the early 9th century, the meaning of "Kartli" was expanded to other areas of medieval Georgia held together by religion, culture, and language. The Georgian circumfix sa-X-o is a standard geographic construction designating "the area where X dwell", where X is an ethnonym.

The earliest reference to "Sakartvelo" occurs in the c. 800 Georgian chronicle by Juansher Juansheriani.

და ვითარცა შევლო ყრუმან კლისურა, რომელი მას ჟამსა იყო საზღვარი საბერძნეთისა და საქართველოსა, და შემუსრა ქალაქი აფშილეთისა ცხუმი. და მოადგა ციხესა ანაკოფისასა.
And when that deaf man [i.e. Umayyad Caliph Marwan II (Georgians named him as "Marwan the Deaf" during his invasion of Georgia)] destroyed Klisura, which was the border of Saberdzneti and Sakartvelo, and he destroyed the city of Tskhumi of Apshileti, and came over the Anacopia Fortress.

— Life of King of Kings Vakhtang Gorgasali

Within the next 200 years, this designation was reconfigured so that it came to signify the all-Georgian realm which came into existence with the political unification of Kartli and Apkhazeti under Bagrat III in 1008. However, it was not until the early 13th century that the term fully entered regular official usage.

The memory and dream of a united Georgia – Sakartvelo – persisted even after the political catastrophe of the 15th century when the Kingdom of Georgia fell apart to form three separate kingdoms: Kartli, Kakheti, and Imereti, and five principalities: Samtskhe-Saatabago, Mingrelia, Guria, Svaneti, and Abkhazia. Thus, the later kings did not relinquish the titles of the all-Georgian monarchs whose legitimate successors they claimed to be. The idea of all-Georgian unity also dominated history-writing of the early 18th-century Georgian scholar and a member of the royal family, Prince Vakhushti, whose Description of the Kingdom of Georgia (agtsera sameposa sakartvelosa) had a noticeable influence on the latter-day conception of Sakartvelo. Although Georgia was politically divided among competing kingdoms and principalities during Vakhushti's lifetime, the scholar viewed the past and present of these breakaway polities as parts of the history of a single nation.

Georgia fell under successive Ottoman, Iranian (Safavid, Afsharids, Qajars), and Russian rule during the 15th to 19th centuries. It was re-united as the short-lived Democratic Republic of Georgia (საქართველოს დემოკრატიული რესპუბლიკა sakartvelos demokratiuli respublika) on May 26, 1918, transformed into the Georgian Soviet Socialist Republic (საქართველოს საბჭოთა სოციალისტური რესპუბლიკა sakartvelos sabchota socialisturi respublika) in 1921, and eventually gaining independence as the Republic of Georgia (საქართველოს რესპუბლიკა sakartvelos respublika) on November 14, 1990. According to the 1995 constitution, the nation's official name is საქართველო sakartvelo.

In other Kartvelian languages, like Mingrelian, Georgia is referred as საქორთუო sakortuo, in Laz it's ოქორთურა okortura, when in Svan it uses the same name as Georgian does, საქართველო sakartvelo. This same root is also adopted in Abkhaz and Georgia is referred as Қырҭтәыла Kyrţtwyla (i.e. Sakartvelo).

== Exonyms ==
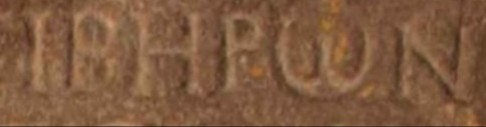
IBHPΩN, Iviron i.e. Iberia, an Ancient Greek inscription on the Stele of Serapeitis, AD 150.

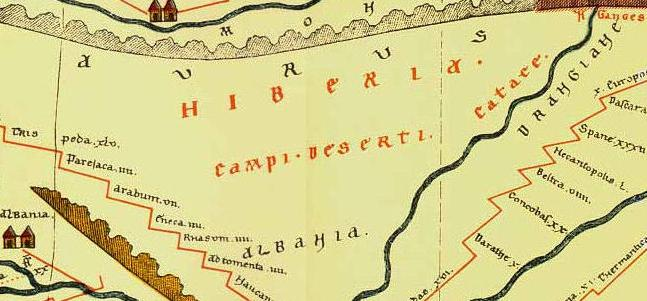
Hiberia i.e. Iberia on Tabula Peutingeriana.

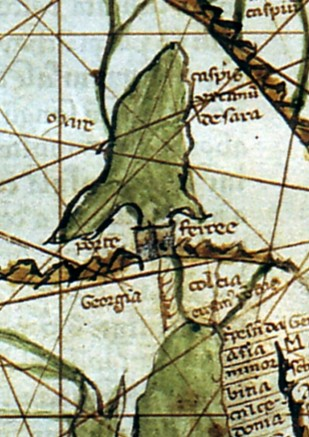
First mention of the country spelled as Georgia, the world map of Pietro Vesconte, AD 1320.

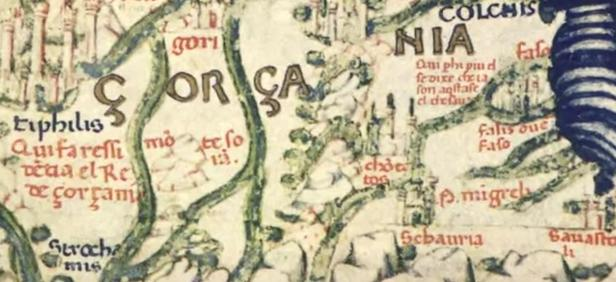
Gorgania i.e. Georgia on Fra Mauro map, AD 1450.

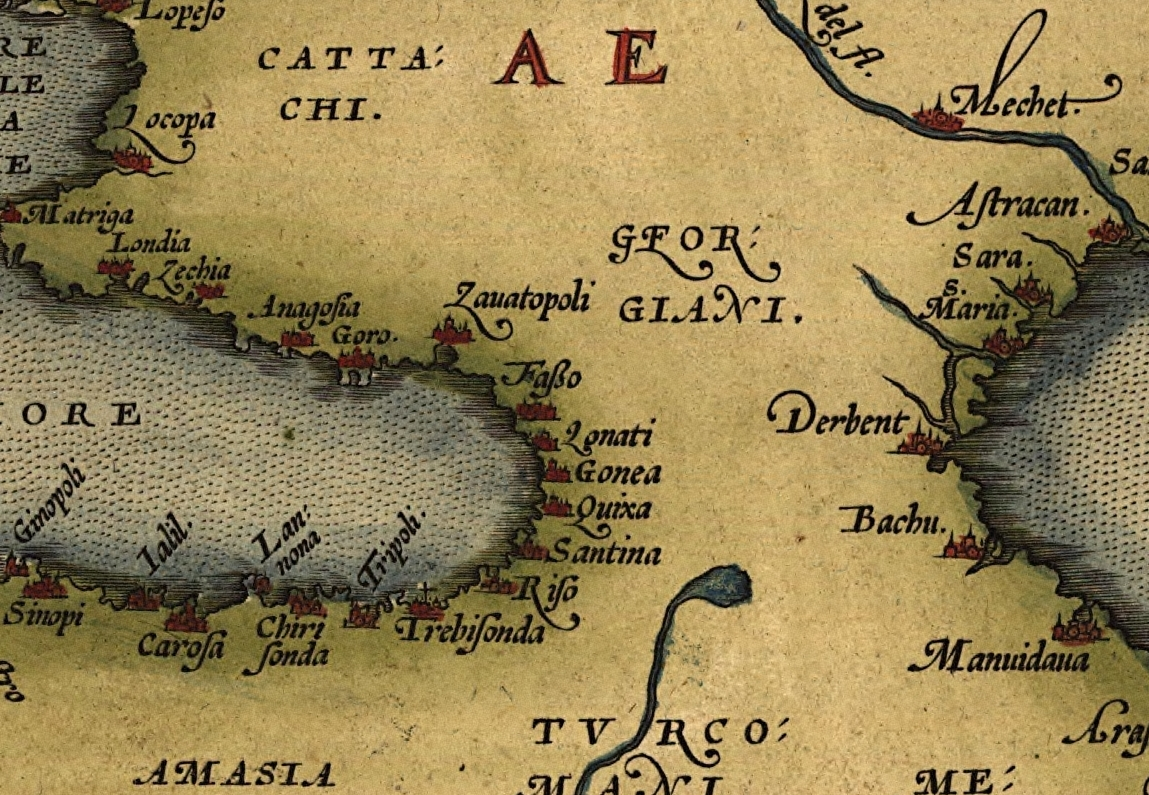
Georgiani on the Map of Europe by Abraham Ortelius, AD 1572.

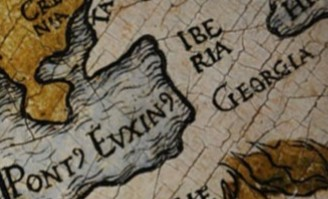
Iberia and Georgia, detail from The Ambassadors, painting of Hans Holbein the Younger, 1533.

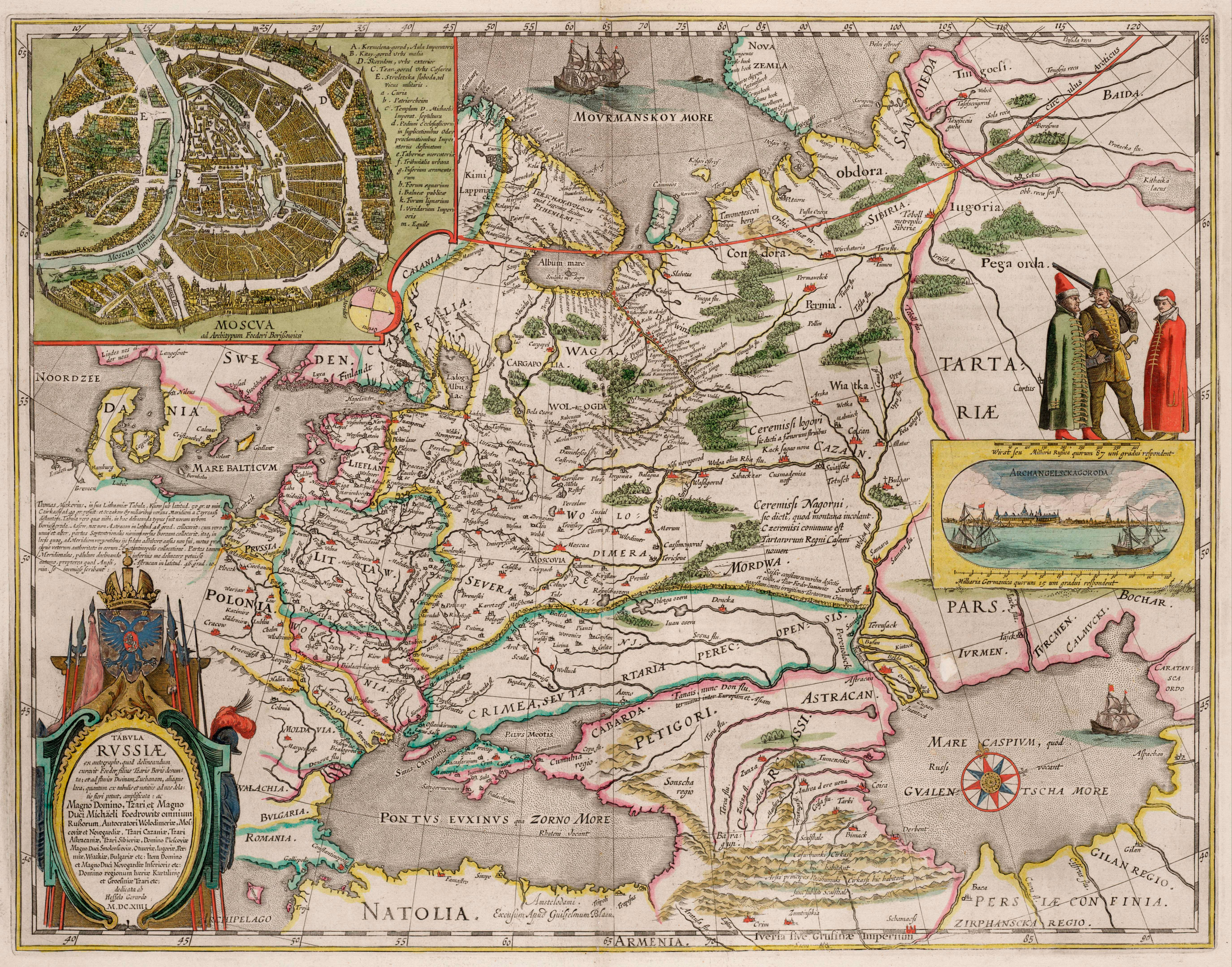
"Map of Russia" commissioned by Feodor II of Russia and published by Hessel Gerritsz in Amsterdam mentions "Iveria sive Grusinæ Imperium" i.e. Iberia or the Empire of Georgia.

=== Iberia ===
One theory on the etymology of the name Iberia, proposed by Giorgi Melikishvili, was that it was derived from the contemporary Armenian designation for Georgia, Virkʿ (Վիրք, and Ivirkʿ Իվիրք and Iverkʿ Իվերք), which itself was connected to the word Sver (or Svir), the Kartvelian designation for Georgians. The letter "s" in this instance served as a prefix for the root word "Ver" (or "Vir"). Accordingly, in following Ivane Javakhishvili's theory, the ethnic designation of "Sber", a variant of Sver, was derived the word "Hber" ("Hver") (and thus Iberia) and the Armenian variants, Veria and Viria.

The Armenian name of Georgia is Վրաստան Vrastan, Վիրք Virk (i.e. Iberia). Ethnic Georgians are referred in Armenian as Վրացիներ (Vratsiner) literally meaning Iberians.

=== Georgia ===
The European "Georgia" probably stems from the Persian designation of the Georgians – gurğ (گرج), ğurğ – which reached the Western European crusaders and pilgrims in the Holy Land who rendered the name as Georgia (also Jorgania, Giorginia, etc.) and, erroneously, explained its origin by the popularity of St. George (Tetri Giorgi) among the Georgians. This explanation is offered, among others, by Jacques de Vitry and Franz Ferdinand von Troilo. Another theory, popularized by the likes of Jean Chardin, semantically linked "Georgia" to Greek γεωργός ("tiller of the land"). The supporters of this explanation sometimes referred to classical authors, in particular Pliny and Pomponius Mela. The "Georgi" mentioned by these authors (Pliny, IV.26, VI.14; Mela, De Sita Orb. i.2, & 50; ii.1, & 44, 102.) were merely agricultural tribes, so named to distinguish them from their unsettled and pastoral neighbors on the other side of the river Panticapea (in Taurica). In the 19th century, Marie-Félicité Brosset favored the derivation of the name Georgia from that of the river Mtkvari via Kuros-Cyrus-Kura-Djurzan.

According to several modern scholars, "Georgia" seems to have been borrowed in the 11th or 12th century from the Syriac gurz-ān/gurz-iyān and Arabic ĵurĵan/ĵurzan, derived from the New Persian gurğ/gurğān, itself stemming from the Middle Persian waručān of unclear origin, but resembling the eastern trans-Caspian toponym Gorgan, which comes from the Old Persian varkâna-, "land of the wolves". This might have been of the same etymology as the Armenian Virk' (Վիրք) and a source of the Greco-Roman rendition Iberi (Ἴβηρες), the ethnonym already known to them as a designation of the Iberian peoples of the Iberian Peninsula.

=== Gruziya ===
The Russian exonym Gruziya (Russian: Грузия, IPA: [ˈɡruzʲɪjə]) is also of Persian origin, from Persian گرجستان Gorjestân (Turkish Gürcistan, Ossetian: Гуырдзыстон Gwyrdzyston, Mongolian Гүрж Gürj).

The Russian name first occurs in the travel records of Ignaty Smolnyanin as gurzi (гурзи) (1389).

А въ церковь ту влѣзщи, ино направѣ Гурзійскаа служба, Гурзіи служатъ.
There is a church and there is a Gurz [i.e. Georgian] liturgy, Gurzis [i.e. Georgians] serve there.

— Travels in Jerusalem

Afanasy Nikitin calls Georgia as gurzynskaya zemlya (Гурзыньская земля, "Gurzin land") (1466–72).

Да Севастѣи губѣ, да Гурзынской земли добро обилію всѣм; да Торская земля обилна.
And in Sevastia, and in the Gurzin land [i.e. Georgian land] everything is in abundance, and Torsk land [i.e. Turkish land] is abundant.

— A Journey Beyond the Three Seas

As a result of permutation of sounds "Gurz" transformed into "Gruz" and eventually "Gruz-iya". The Russian name was brought into several Slavic languages (Belarusian, Bulgarian, Croatian, Czech, Macedonian, Polish, Serbian, Slovak, Slovenian, Ukrainian) as well as other languages historically in contact with the Russian Empire and/or the Soviet Union (such as Latvian, Lithuanian, Estonian, Hungarian, Yiddish, Kyrgyz, Turkmen, Uyghur, Chinese, Japanese, Korean, Vietnamese).

==== Abandoning the name ====
In August 2005, the Georgian ambassador to Israel Lasha Zhvania asked that the Hebrew speakers refer to his country as Georgia גאורגיה and abandon the name Gruzia. The name entered the contemporary Hebrew as גרוזיה (Gruz-ia). It coexisted with the names גאורגיה (Gheorghia with two hard g's) and גורג'יה (Gurjia), when Gruzia took over in the 1970s, probably due to a massive immigration of bilingual Georgian-Russian Jews to Israel at that time. Georgia's request was approved and now Israel refers to the country as Gheorghia.

In June 2011, the Ministry of Foreign Affairs of Georgia said South Korea had agreed to refer to the country as 조지아 (Jojia) instead of the Russian-influenced 그루지야 (Geurujiya) and the government of Georgia was continuing talks with other countries on the issue. Although North Korea still uses 그루지야 as of 2024.

In April 2015, Japan changed the official Japanese name for Georgia from Gurujia (グルジア), which derives from the Russian term Gruziya, to Jōjia (ジョージア), which derives from the English term "Georgia".

In May 2018, Lithuania switched to Sakartvelas, which is derived from Georgia's original native name Sakartvelo. The new name would be an alternative for Georgia alongside the long-established Gruzija. Georgia had initially asked for a change in December 2009 to be called Georgija instead of Gruzija; the request was forwarded to the Commission of the Lithuanian Language and was declined at that time. In 2010, then-Minister of Foreign Affairs of Georgia Grigol Vashadze during his official visit to Lithuania promised to "destroy the name Gruziya" and asked the Lithuanian authorities for a name switch. Lithuanian authorities made the switch for Independence Day of Georgia and described it as a "great gift to the Georgian people" when Georgia celebrated the 100th anniversary of the declaration of independence of the First Republic of Georgia. As a gesture of appreciation, Georgia also changed Lithuania's Russian-derived name of Litva (Russian: Литва) to its native Lietuva. Accordingly, the Embassy of Georgia in Lithuania changed its name from Gruzijos Ambasada to Sakartvelo Ambasada. However, as of 2019, the traditional name Gruzija was still more popular than the new name in media and on social networks. On December 21, 2020, the State Commission of the Lithuanian Language (VLKK) decided that the name Sakartvelas should be used in all official Lithuanian-language documents.

In June 2019, during the 2019 Georgian protests, former Ukrainian president Petro Poroshenko called upon the Ministry of Foreign Affairs of Ukraine to change Gruziya to Sakartvelo.

== See also ==
- Name of Armenia
- Name of Greece

== Bibliography ==
- (in Georgian) Paichadze, Giorgi (ed., 1993), საქართველოსა და ქართველების აღმნიშვნელი უცხოური და ქართული ტერმინოლოგია (Foreign and Georgian designations for Georgia and Georgians). Metsniereba, ISBN 5-520-01504-X
