= Bolnisi inscriptions =

Old Georgian inscriptions in the Bolnisi Sioni Cathedral, Georgia

- Inscription 1
- Writing: Georgian script
- Created: AD 494 (1532 years ago)
- Present location: Simon Janashia Museum of Georgia, Tbilisi
- Language: Old Georgian

The Bolnisi inscriptions (Georgian: ბოლნისის წარწერები, romanized: bolnisis ts'arts'erebi) are the Old Georgian inscriptions written in the Georgian Asomtavruli script on the Bolnisi Sioni Cathedral, a basilica located in Bolnisi, Bolnisi Municipality, Georgia. The inscriptions are dated AD 493/494. The construction of the basilica commenced in AD 478/479.

== Inscriptions ==
=== Inscription 1 ===
ႵႤႣႧႤႮႨႱႩႭႮႭႱႨႩႰႤႡႭ
ჃႪႨႧႭჃႰႧႣႠႠႫႠႱႤႩ
ႪႤႱႨႠႱႠ bolnisi cross ႸႨႬႠႸႤႬႣ
ႠႫႨႫႠ bolnisi cross ႰႧႧႠჃ
ႷႠႬႨႱႫ bolnisi cross ႺႤႫႤႪ
ႬႨႸႤႨႼႷ bolnisi cross ႠႪႤႬႣႠ
ႫႸႰႭႫႤႪႧႠႠႫႠႱႤႩႪႤ
ႱႨႠႱႠႸႨႬႠႸႤႾႤႼႨႤႨႨ

K(risṭ)e D(avi)t eṗisḳoṗosi ḳrebo-
wlitowrt da amas eḳ-
lesiasa šina šend-
a mima rt taw-
q̇anism- cemel-
ni šeic̣q̇alen da
mšromelta amas eḳle-
siasa šina šexec̣ie ii

Translation: Jesus Christ, have mercy on David the Bishop and those who built this church for your worship.

=== Inscription 2 ===
Inscription 2

ႨႱႠႱႠႫႤႡႨႱႠჂႧႠႭႺႼႪႨႱႠႮႤႰႭႦႫႤႴ
ႠႫႨႱႤႩႪႤႱႨႠჂႱႠჂႣႠႠႧႾႭჃႧႫႤႲႼႪႨႱ
ႬႠႵႠႸႨႬႠႧႠჃႷႠႬႨႱႾႺႤႱႶႬႸႤႨႼႷႠႪႤႬႣႠႥႨႬႠ
ႮႨႱႩႭႮႭႱႱႠႾႭჃႪႭႺႭႱႨႢႨႺႠႶႬႸႤႨႼႷႠႪႤ

[šec̣evnita c̣mid]isa samebisayta oc c̣lisa P̣eroz mep[isa ze]
[xikmna dac̣q̇ebaj] amis eḳlesiajsaj da atxowtmeṭ c̣lis[a šemdgomad]
[ganxešora vi]n aka šina tawq̇anis xces ġ(mertman) šeic̣q̇alen da vin a[mis eḳl]
[esiajsa D(avi)t e] ṗisḳoṗossa xowlocos igica ġ(mertma)n šeic̣q̇alen [amēn]

Translation: With the mercy of Trinity, 20 years of reigning King Peroz when founded this church and 15 years thereafter it was completed. God have mercy who show reverence herein, and the builder of this church David the Bishop, and who pray for you, o God have mercy, Amen.

This second inscription yields a reference to Peroz I, the Shahanshah ("King of Kings") of the Sasanian Empire. Following the Treaty of Acilisene, the Eastern Roman Empire admitted the loss of the Kingdom of Iberia (where Bolnisi was located) to the Sasanians. Sassanian rulers were the official suzerains of the area at that time, hence Peroz's reign being used to date the building. The situation, however, was fluid and King Vakhtang I was locked in intermittent conflict with the Persians. Georgians' ally, Byzantium, was not able to assist, as it was entirely preoccupied with fighting the Ostrogoths in the west. After Peroz's death, Georgians also refused to join his son Kavad I in military campaigns against Byzantium, resulting in Iberian provinces getting "torched" by Persians.

== See also ==
- Bir el Qutt inscriptions
- Georgian graffiti of Nazareth and Sinai
- Greco-Georgian mosaic of Mount Zion
- Umm Leisun inscription

== Bibliography ==
- Rapp, Stephen H. Jr. (2014) The Sasanian World through Georgian Eyes: Caucasia and the Iranian Commonwealth in Late Antique Georgian Literature, Ashgate Publishing, ISBN 978-1-4724-2552-2
- Rayfield, Donald (2012). Edge of Empires: A History of Georgia. Reaktion Books. ISBN 9781780230702.
