= Georgian graffiti of Nazareth and Sinai =

Ancient Georgian graffiti

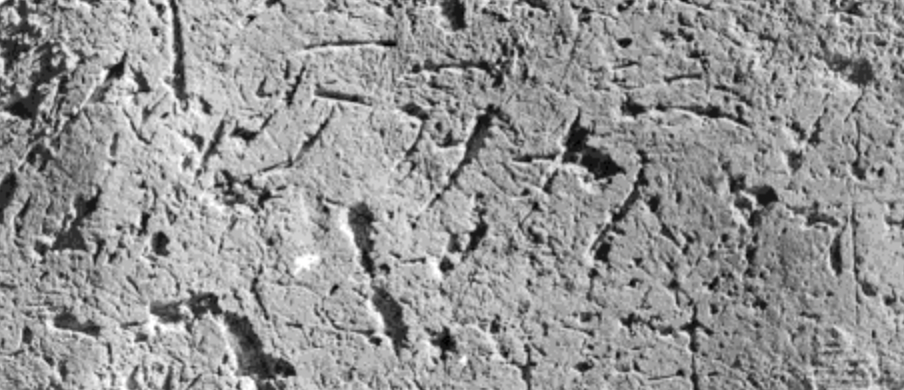
- ႸႤ[…]ႨႳ[…]ႵႤ[…]ႢႨ graffito reading "[Jesus] Christ, have mercy on Giorgi"
- Material: Plaster
- Writing: Asomtavruli script
- Created: VII-IX centuries
- Discovered: 1950s
- Present location: Nazareth
- Language: Old Georgian

The Georgian graffiti of Nazareth and Sinai (Georgian: ნაზარეთის და სინაის ქართული გრაფიტი, romanized: nazaretis da sinais kartuli grapit'i) are the Old Georgian pilgrim graffiti inscriptions written in ancient Georgian Asomtavruli script found in Nazareth and Mount Sinai. The excavations were carried out under the guidance of the Italian archaeologist and Franciscan priest Bellarmino Bagatti from 1955 to 1960. Georgian pilgrimage towards the Holy Land started from the 5th century, reaching even the most distant sanctuaries. (Note: This will result foundation of several Georgian monastic areas primarily by Peter the Iberian. Georgian mosaic Bir el Qutt inscriptions found in an abandoned church founded or renovated by Peter, in the Judaean Desert, archaeologically testifies as the oldest extant Georgian inscriptions.) All these graffiti artifacts are preserved at the Franciscan Museum near the Greek Orthodox Church of the Annunciation.

== Graffiti ==
=== Nazareth graffiti ===
The Georgian graffiti from Nazareth are poorly preserved and fragmentary in nature. Of the four inscriptions, only one can be deciphered as a complete sentence composed of the four abbreviated words:

ႥႪႤ[…]ႪႨ

vle[…]li

Translation: "Apostle Paul"

Ⴀ

a

Ⴉ

k'

ႸႤ[…]ႨႳ[…]ႵႤ[…]ႢႨ

she[…]iu[…]ke[…]gi

Translation: "Jesus Christ, have mercy on Giorgi".

=== Sinai graffiti ===
In Sinai, a total number of twelve Georgian inscriptions were discovered. They were left by pilgrims on their way to the sanctuaries of Sinai or on the way back. Georgian Sinaitic graffiti inscriptions were discovered in the Wadi Mukattab and Wadi Haggag areas, both major routes of pilgrim-traffic in the Byzantine and Early Islamic period. Most of these Georgian inscriptions are carved out in relatively low, easily accessible places. The letters are usually small, their size not exceeding few centimeters, even the biggest of the inscriptions with its 12 cm high letters is not of monumental character.

ႵႤ[…]ႦႭႱႨႫႤ[…]ႸႤ

ke[…]zosime[…]she

Translation: "Jesus Christ, have mercy on Zosime".

ႵႤ[…]ႸႪႤ[…]ႫႬჂ

ke[…]shle[…]mny

Translation: "Jesus Christ, have mercy on your monk".

ႼႭ[…]ႱႨႬႠ[…]ႸႤ[…]ႫႤ[…]ႼႭ

tsʼo[…]sina[…]she[…]me[…]tsʼo

Translation: "Holy Sinai, have mercy on me, o holy".

ႣႤ[…]ႠႫ

de[…]am

Translation: "Greatness, Amen”.

ႭႭ[…]ႸႤ[…]ႫႨႱႵႨ[…]ႸႤ[…]ႾႪႬႨ[…]ႢႡႪ

oo[…]she[…]miski[…]she[…]khlni[…]gbl

Translation: "O, Lord, have mercy on Miski, (Note: The original name most probably was Meskhi, i.e. a "Meskhetian".) have mercy on the fruits(?) of Gabriel".

ႤႣ[…]ႢႥ

ed[…]gv

Translation: "For prayer" (?)

ႢႰႨႢႭႪ

Grigol

== Dating ==
The Georgian graffiti were found incised, together with the Greek, Syriac, Latin and Armenian letters, on plaster in the remains of an ancient shrine discovered under the mosaic pavements of a ruined Byzantine church and dated by Joan E. Taylor to the period between 340 and 427. The early sanctuary in Nazareth should therefore date between 330 and 427, and the Georgian and other graffiti should be discussed within this chronological frame. A mid 4th - 5th centuries date seems appropriate for the Greek and Syriac inscriptions, but is extremely early for the Armenian and Georgian graffiti. Georgian inscriptions from Nazareth and Sinai are dated from 7th to 9th centuries. The Georgian finds were studied and published by the Georgian historian and linguist Zaza Aleksidze.

Such an early pilgrimage of Georgian Christians illustrates active involvement towards the Holy Land shortly after the christianization of the Kingdom of Iberia. Further, Werner Seibt suggests that the Georgian script could have been invented in Syro-Palestine by the expatriate Georgian monks. They might have been supported in their endeavor by their high-ranking aristocratic countrymen such as Bacurius the Iberian, a Byzantine commander in Palestine.

== See also ==
- Georgian graffito of Nessana
- Bir el Qutt inscriptions
- Umm Leisun inscription

== Bibliography ==
- CIIP (2023) Galilaea and Northern Regions: 6925-7818, Part 2, ISBN 978-3-11-071574-3
- Codoñer, J. S. (2014) New Alphabets For the Christian Nations: Frontier strategies in the Byzantine commonwealth between the 4th and 10th centuries, University of Valladolid, ISBN 978-1-4438-6395-7
- Tchekhanovets, Y. (2011) Early Georgian Pilgrimage to the Holy Land, Liber Annuus 61
- Tchekhanovets, Yana (2018-05-07). The Caucasian Archaeology of the Holy Land: Armenian, Georgian and Albanian communities between the fourth and eleventh centuries CE. BRILL. ISBN 978-90-04-36555-1.
- Khurtsilava, B. (2018) Traces of the Georgians on the Holy Land, Tbilisi, ISBN 978-9941-8-0042-9
