= Umm Leisun inscription =

Georgian inscription

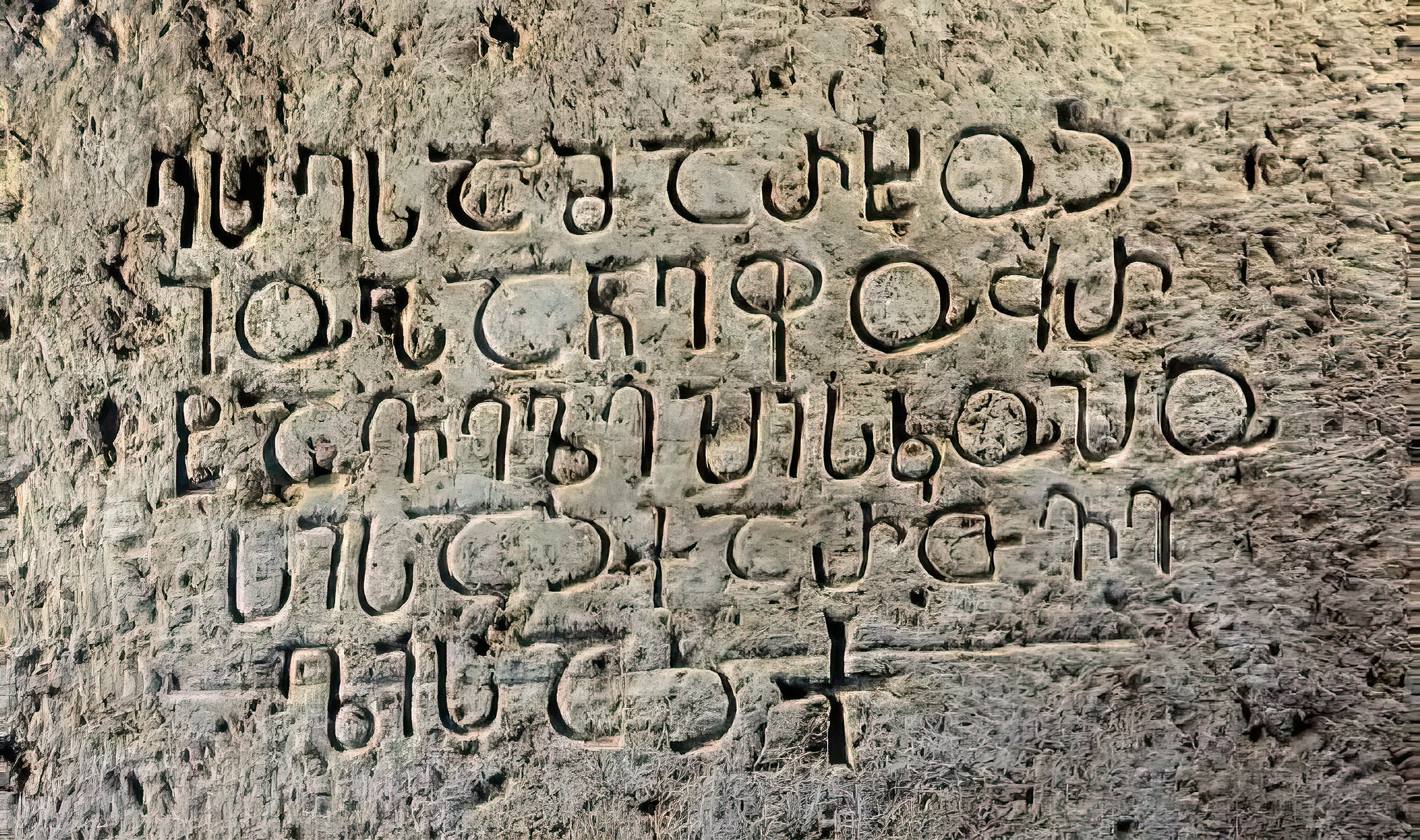
- Material: Limestone
- Writing: Georgian script
- Created: 5th or 6th century
- Discovered: 2002
- Present location: Archaeological Garden of Knesset, Israel Antiquities Authority, Jerusalem
- Language: Old Georgian

The Umm Leisun inscription (Georgian: უმ ლეისუნის წარწერა, romanized: um leisunis ts'arts'era) is an Old Georgian limestone tombstone slab. It has a five-line inscription written in the Georgian Asomtavruli script and was discovered in 2002, after the renewal of 1996 excavation at a Georgian monastery of the Byzantine period, in the neighborhood of Umm Leisun, in the southern part of Sur Baher, 4.5 km southeast of the Old City of Jerusalem. It was found in a burial crypt under the polychrome mosaic floor.

In total about 24 interments were discovered in the crypt. Per sex estimation for human skeletons, all of them were adult males, as would be expected in a monastery. The occupant of the most important tomb identified by a Georgian inscription was a "Georgian bishop Iohane" (John in Old Georgian), who was also the oldest and his age underlined his special status. He would have been aged 66 or 67 when he died, and had suffered from osteoporosis. The inscription is the earliest known example for an ethnonym ႵႠႰႧႥႤႪႨ (kartveli i.e. Georgian) on any archaeological artifact, both in the Holy Land and in Georgia.

The inscription measures 81 × 49 cm cut into the tombstone. It is dated to the end of the 5th or the first half of the 6th century AD. The inscription is kept at the Archaeological Garden of Knesset.

== Inscription ==
ႤႱႤႱႠႫႠႰႾႭჂ
ႨႭჀႠႬႤႴႭჃႰ
ႲႠႥႤႪႤႮႨႱႩႭႮႭ
ႱႨႱႠჂႵႠႰႧႥႤ
ႪႨႱႠჂ✢

esesamarkhoy
iohanepowr
tavelepʼiskʼopʼo
sisaykartve
lisay✢

Translation: This is the grave of John, Bishop of Purtavi, a Georgian.

== See also ==
- Bir el Qutt inscriptions
- Georgian graffiti of Nazareth and Sinai
- Epitaph of Samuel
- Greco-Georgian mosaic of Mount Zion

== Bibliography ==
- Seligman, J. (2015). "A Georgian Monastery from the Byzantine Period at Khirbat Umm Leisun, Jerusalem". 'Atiqot. 83: 145–180.
- Tchekhanovets, Y. (2014) Iohane, Bishop of Purtavi and Caucasian Albanians in the Holy Land
- Khurtsilava, B. (2014) A Georgian Monastery of Purta, Istoriani
