= Kartvelian languages =

Language family indigenous to the South Caucasus

Kartvelian
- Geographic distribution: South Caucasus, East Black Sea region
- Linguistic classification: One of the world's primary language families
- Proto-language: Proto-Kartvelian
- Subdivisions: Svan; Georgian-Zan (Karto-Zan)

Language codes
- ISO 639-5: ccs
- Glottolog: kart1248
- Linguasphere: 42-C
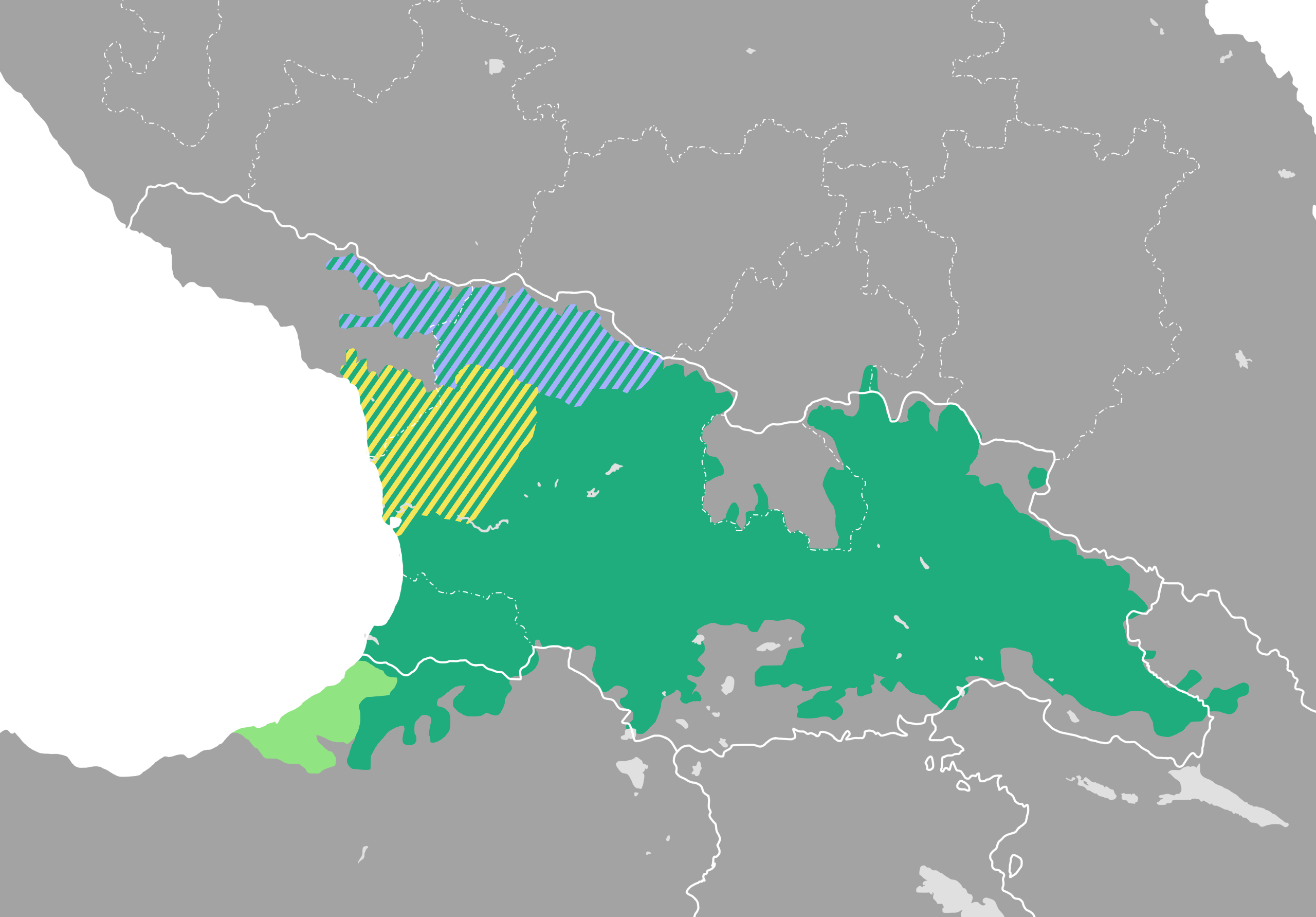
Distribution of the Kartvelian languages.
Karto-Zan
Georgian
Mingrelian
Laz
Svan
Svan

The Kartvelian languages (/kɑːrtˈvɛliən, -ˈviːl-/ kart-VEL-ee-ən, -VEEL-; Georgian: ქართველური ენები, romanized: kartveluri enebi) (Note: On occasion they have also been referred to as South Caucasian or Kartvelic languages.) are a language family indigenous to and spoken primarily in Georgia. It is not related to any other language family in the world, making it one of the primary language families.

The most widely spoken Kartvelian language, and the only literary language in the family, is standard Georgian. There are approximately 4 million Georgian language speakers worldwide. Georgian scripts are used to write all Kartvelian languages. The earliest known written record of any Kartvelian language is an Old Georgian inscription found at the now-defunct Georgian Orthodox monastery near Bethlehem, referencing Georgian missionary Peter the Iberian and dated to c. 430 AD. The earliest securely dated written record inside Georgia are the Bolnisi inscriptions.

== Status ==
Georgian is the official language of Georgia (spoken by 90% of the population) and serves as its main language for literary and business use. It is written with an original and distinctive alphabet, and the oldest surviving literary text dates from the 5th century AD. The old Georgian script seems to have been distinct from every other language, but their alphabetical order largely corresponds to the Greek alphabet, with the exception of letters denoting uniquely Georgian sounds, which are grouped at the end.

Mingrelian has historically been only a spoken, regional language and Mingrelian speakers have traditionally relied on the standard Georgian as their literary language. Through the late 19th century there were no known written Mingrelian grammar books or dictionaries. There have been some limited publications in Mingrelian throughout the 20th and 21st centuries, but printing publications in Mingrelian is controversial because it is seen as deviation from its historic profile as a non-literary language.

The Laz language was written mainly between 1927 and 1937, and then in Turkey using the Latin alphabet. Laz is endangered as its speakers are shifting to Turkish.

== Classification ==
The Kartvelian language family consists of four closely related languages:

- Svan (ლუშნუ ნინ, lušnu nin), with approximately 35,000–40,000 native speakers in Georgia, mainly in the northwestern mountainous region of Svaneti and the Kodori Gorge in Abkhazia.
- Georgian-Zan (also called Karto-Zan)
  - Georgian (ქართული ენა, kartuli ena) with approximately 4 million native speakers, mainly in Georgia. There are Georgian-speaking communities in Russia, Turkey, Iran, Israel, and EU countries, but their current numbers and distribution are unknown.
    - Judaeo-Georgian (ყივრული ენა, kivruli ena) with some 85,000 speakers, is the only Kartvelian Jewish dialect, its status being the subject of debate among scholars.
  - Zan (also called Colchian)
    - Mingrelian (მარგალური ნინა, margaluri nina), with some 500,000 native speakers in 1989, mainly in the western regions of Georgia, namely Samegrelo and Abkhazia (at present in Gali district only). The number of Mingrelian speakers in Abkhazia was very strongly affected by the war with Georgia in the 1990s which resulted in the expulsion and flight of the ethnic Georgian population, the majority of which were Mingrelians. Nevertheless, Georgians in Abkhazia (mostly Mingrelians) make up 18% of the population, in Gali district 98.2%. The Mingrelians displaced from Abkhazia are scattered elsewhere in the Georgian government territory, with dense clusters in Tbilisi and Zugdidi.
    - Laz (ლაზური ნენა, lazuri nena), with 22,000 native speakers in 1980, mostly in the Black Sea littoral area of northeast Turkey, and with some 2,000 in Adjara, Georgia.

=== Genealogical tree ===
Proto-Kartvelian
Proto-Georgian-Zan (Proto-Karto-Zan)
Zan
Svan | Mingrelian | Laz | Georgian

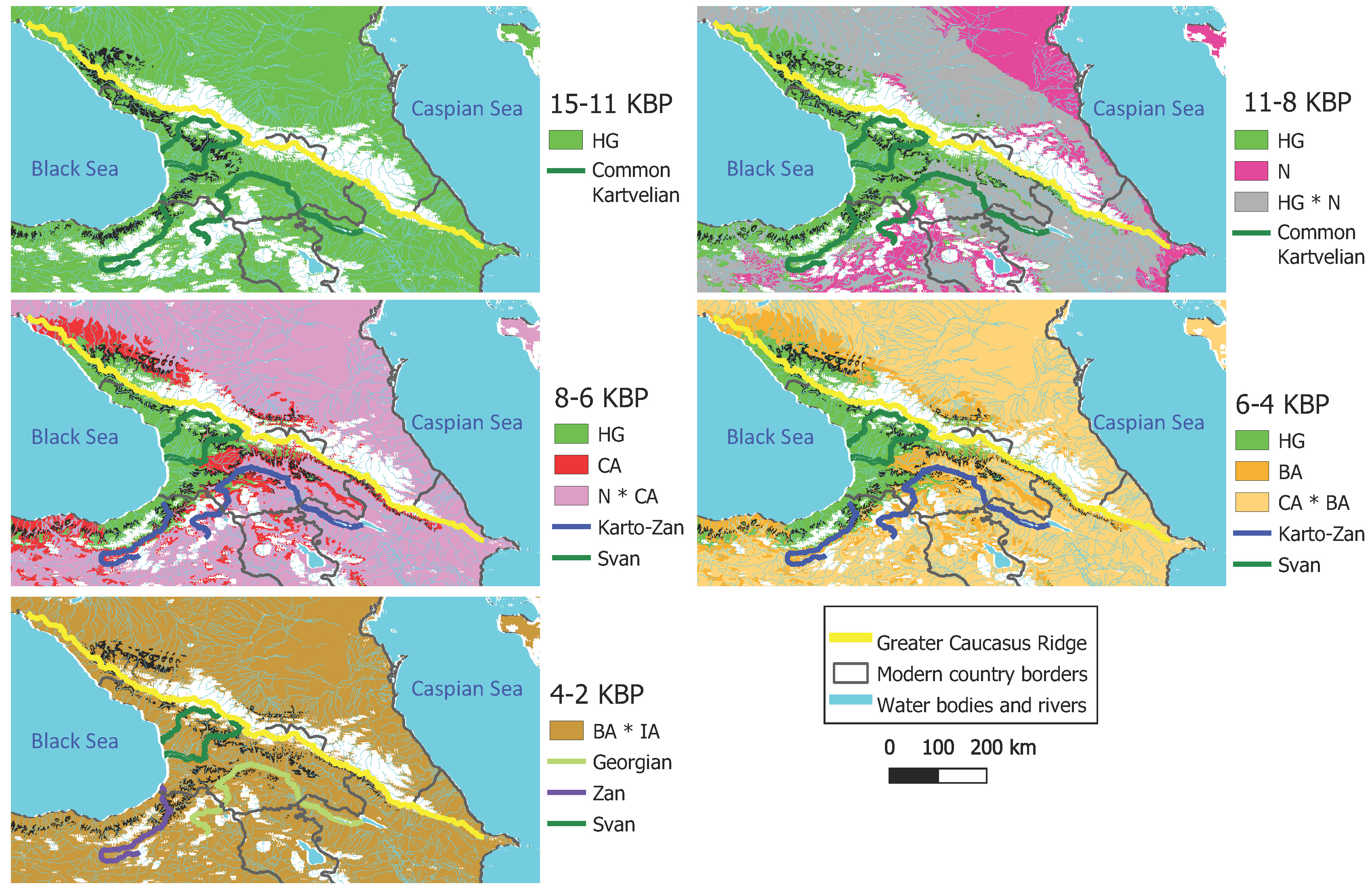
Proposed Kartvelian evolution showing wildlife with reconstructed proto-Kartvelian names (black areas); past societies (HG: Hunter-gatherers, N: Neolithic, CA: Copper Age, BA: Bronze Age, IA: Iron Age); and major rivers in whose watersheds extant Kartvelian languages evolved (colored lines). KBP means millennia before 1950.

The Kartvelian, or South Caucasian, family comprises Georgian, Svan, Mingrelian, and Laz. Its common internal classification identifies Svan as the first branch to separate from Proto-Kartvelian. Georgian, Mingrelian, and Laz descend from Proto-Karto-Zan, within which Mingrelian and Laz form the Zan branch.

The connection between these languages was first noted in the linguistic literature by Johann Anton Güldenstädt in his 1773 classification of the languages of the Caucasus and was subsequently demonstrated by Georg Rosen, Marie-Félicité Brosset, Franz Bopp, and others in the 1840s. It is worth noting, however, that Georgians had recognized the relatedness of these languages long before the emergence of modern linguistics. In his 1745 work Description of the Kingdom of Georgia, the Georgian geographer and historian Prince Vakhushti of Kartli described Mingrelian as a "corrupted" form of Georgian, supporting his view by citing words in the two languages that were similar in form and meaning.

The chronology of Kartvelian branching remains uncertain. Traditional calculations based on rates of vocabulary replacement place the separation of Svan in the third millennium BC and the Georgian–Zan division in the first millennium BC, with one reconstruction dating the latter to approximately the eighth century BC. One 2023 study using a Bayesian phylogenetic analysis recovered the same branching structure but estimated the Svan–Karto-Zan division at a mean of 7,641 years BP and the Georgian–Zan division at 2,617 years BP. The authors reported a wide credible interval for the earlier division.

Scholars have variously located the Proto-Kartvelian homeland in western or southwestern Georgia, northeastern Anatolia, the Lesser Caucasus, and the Armenian Highlands. Reconstructed vocabulary relating to plants, animals, pastoralism, agriculture, and textile production has been used to support proposed locations in the uplands of western Georgia and eastern Anatolia. A 2023 study compared its linguistic phylogeny with reconstructed plant and animal distributions, archaeological and environmental evidence, and population-genetic patterns. It proposed a homeland largely overlapping the Colchis glacial refugium in western Georgia.

The processes through which the Kartvelian languages acquired their historical distributions remain incompletely understood. Proposed explanations include migration, territorial expansion, bilingualism, assimilation, and language shift. Historical-linguistic reconstructions suggest that Svan was formerly spoken across a wider part of western Georgia, while Mingrelian and Laz were geographically separated due to the westward spread of Georgian-speaking communities during the seventh and eighth centuries AD. The later predominance of Georgian in government, literature, and worship is associated with the political influence of Kartli (Iberia), the adoption of Christianity, and the institutions of the Georgian Church.

=== Higher-level connections ===
No relationship with other languages, including Northwest Caucasian and/or Northeast Caucasian, has been demonstrated so far. There have been numerous attempts to link Kartvelian languages to other language families, such as the proposed Nostratic family, but these have fallen out of favor. Certain grammatical similarities with Basque, particularly in the case system, have often been noted. However, the hypothesis of a relationship, which also tends to link the Caucasian languages with other non-Indo-European and non-Semitic languages of the ancient Near East, is generally considered to lack conclusive evidence. Any similarities to other linguistic phyla may be due to areal influences. Heavy borrowing in both directions (i.e., from North Caucasian to Kartvelian and vice versa) has been observed; therefore, it is likely that certain grammatical features have also been influenced.

== Phonetics and phonology ==
=== Regular correspondences ===
Vowels
| Proto-Kartv. | Geo. | Zan | Svan |
|---|---|---|---|
| *ა (*a) [ɑ] | a [ɑ] | o [ɔ] | a [ɑ] |
| *ე (*e) [ɛ] | e [ɛ] | a [ɑ] | e [ɛ] |
| *ი (*i) [i] | i [i] | i [i] | i [i] |
| *ო (*o) [ɔ] | o [ɔ] | o [ɔ] | o [ɔ] |
| *უ (*u) [u] | u [u] | u [u] | u [u] |

Consonants
| | Proto-Kartv. | Geo. | Zan | Svan |
|---|---|---|---|---|
| Voiced stops | *ბ (*b) [b] | b [b] | b [b] | b [b] |
| Voiced stops | *დ (*d) [d] | d [d] | d [d] | d [d] |
| Voiced stops | *გ (*g) [ɡ] | g [ɡ] | g [ɡ] | g / ǯ [ɡ] / [d͡ʒ] |
| Voiced affricates | *ძ (*ʒ) [d͡z] | ʒ [d͡z] | ʒ [d͡z] | ʒ / z [d͡z] / [z] |
| Voiced affricates | *ძ₁ (*ʒ₁) [ɖʐ] | ʒ [d͡z] | ǯ [d͡ʒ] | ǯ / ž [d͡ʒ] / [ʒ] |
| Voiced affricates | *ჯ (*ǯ) [d͡ʒ] | ǯ [d͡ʒ] | ǯg / ʒg [d͡ʒɡ] / [d͡zɡ] | ǯg / sg [d͡ʒɡ] / [sɡ] |
| Voiced fricatives | *ზ (*z) [z] | z [z] | z [z] | z [z] |
| Voiced fricatives | *ზ₁ (*z₁) [ʐ] | z [z] | ž [ʒ] | ž [ʒ] |
| Voiced fricatives | *ღ (*ɣ) [ɣ] | ɣ [ɣ] | ɣ [ɣ] | ɣ [ɣ] |
| Voiced fricatives | *უ̂ (*w) [w] | v [v] | v [v] | w [w] |
| Ejective stops | *პ (*ṗ) [pʼ] | ṗ [pʼ] | ṗ [pʼ] | ṗ [pʼ] |
| Ejective stops | *ტ (*ṭ) [tʼ] | ṭ [tʼ] | ṭ [tʼ] | ṭ [tʼ] |
| Ejective stops | *კ (*ḳ) [kʼ] | ḳ [kʼ] | ḳ [kʼ] | ḳ / č' [kʼ] / [t͡ʃʼ] |
| Ejective stops | *ყ (*qʼ) [qʼ] | qʼ [qʼ] | qʼ / ʔ / ḳ [qʼ] / [ʔ] / [kʼ] | qʼ [qʼ] |
| Ejective affr. | *წ (*ċ) [t͡sʼ] | ċ [t͡sʼ] | ċ [t͡sʼ] | ċ [t͡sʼ] |
| Ejective affr. | *წ₁ (*ċ₁) [ʈʂʼ] | ċ [t͡sʼ] | čʼ [t͡ʃʼ] | čʼ [t͡ʃʼ] |
| Ejective affr. | *ტʼ (*ɬʼ) [t͡ɬʼ] | ċ [t͡sʼ] | čʼ [t͡ʃʼ] | h [h] |
| Ejective affr. | *ჭ (*čʼ) [t͡ʃʼ] | čʼ [t͡ʃʼ] | čʼḳ / ċḳ [t͡ʃʼkʼ] / [t͡sʼkʼ] | čʼḳ / šḳ [t͡ʃʼkʼ] / [ʃkʼ] |
| Voiceless stops and affr. | *ფ (*p) [p] | p [p] | p [p] | p [p] |
| Voiceless stops and affr. | *თ (*t) [t] | t [t] | t [t] | t [t] |
| Voiceless stops and affr. | *ც (*c) [t͡s] | c [t͡s] | c [t͡s] | c [t͡s] |
| Voiceless stops and affr. | *ც₁ (*c₁) [ʈʂ] | c [t͡s] | č [t͡ʃ] | č [t͡ʃ] |
| Voiceless stops and affr. | *ჩ (*č) [t͡ʃ] | č [t͡ʃ] | čk [t͡ʃk] | čk / šg [t͡ʃk] / [ʃɡ] |
| Voiceless stops and affr. | *ქ (*k) [k] | k [k] | k [k] | k / č [k] / [t͡ʃ] |
| Voiceless stops and affr. | *ჴ (*q) [q] | x [x] | x [x] | q [q] |
| Voiceless fricatives | *ხ (*x) [x] | x [x] | x [x] | x [x] |
| Voiceless fricatives | *შ (*š) [ʃ] | š [ʃ] | šk / sk [ʃk] / [sk] | šg / sg [ʃɡ] / [sɡ] |
| Voiceless fricatives | *ს (*s) [s] | s [s] | s [s] | s [s] |
| Voiceless fricatives | *ს₁ (*s₁) [ʂ] | s [s] | š [ʃ] | š [ʃ] |
| Voiceless fricatives | *ლʿ (*lʿ) [ɬ] | s [s] | ∅ | l [l] |
| Liquids | *ლ (*l) [l] | l [l] | l [l] | l [l] |
| Liquids | *რ (*r) [r] | r [r] | r [r] | r [r] |
| Nasals | *მ (*m) [m] | m [m] | m [m] | m [m] |
| Nasals | *ნ (*n) [n] | n [n] | n [n] | n [n] |

== Grammar ==
=== Noun classification ===
The Kartvelian languages have traces of grammatical gender based on animacy, classifying objects as intelligent ("who"-class) and unintelligent ("what"-class) beings.

Noun classification scheme
| Concrete | | | Abstract |
| Animate | | Inanimate | |
| Human and "human-like" beings (e.g. God, deities, angels) | Animals | Inanimate physical entities | Abstract objects |
| Intelligent | Unintelligent | | |
| "who"-class | "what"-class | | |

=== Declension ===
Grammatical case markers
| Case | Singular | | | | Plural | | | |
| Case | Mingrelian | Laz | Georgian | Svan | Mingrelian | Laz | Georgian | Svan |
|---|---|---|---|---|---|---|---|---|
| Nominative | -i | -i/-e | -i | -i | -ep-i | -ep-e | -eb-i | -är |
| Ergative | -k | -k | -ma | -d | -ep-k | -epe-k | -eb-ma | -är-d |
| Dative | -s | -s | -s | -s | -ep-s | -epe-s | -eb-s | -är-s |
| Genitive | -iš | -iš | -is | -iš | -ep-iš | -epe-š(i) | -eb-is | -are-š |
| Lative | -iša | -iša | —N/a | —N/a | -ep-iša | -epe-ša | —N/a | —N/a |
| Ablative | -iše | -iše | —N/a | —N/a | -ep-iše | -epe-še(n) | —N/a | —N/a |
| Instrumental | -it | -ite | -it | -šw | -ep-it | -epe-te(n) | -eb-it | -är-šw |
| Adverbial | -o(t)/-t | -ot | -ad/-d | -d | -ep-o(t) | —N/a | -eb-ad | -är-d |
| Finalis | -išo(t) | —N/a | -isad | -išd | -ep-išo(t) | —N/a | -eb-isad | -är-išd |
| Vocative | —N/a | —N/a | -o (/-v) | —N/a | —N/a | —N/a | -eb-o | —N/a |

Example adjective declension Stem: ǯveš- (Min.), mǯveš- (Laz), ʒvel- (Geo.), ǯwinel- (Svan) – "old"
| Case | Singular | | | | Plural | | | |
| Case | Mingrelian | Laz | Georgian | Svan | Mingrelian | Laz | Georgian | Svan |
|---|---|---|---|---|---|---|---|---|
| Nominative | ǯveš-i | mǯveš-i | ʒvel-i | ǯwinel | ǯveš-ep-i | mǯveš-ep-e | ʒvel-eb-i | ǯwinel-är |
| Ergative | ǯveš-k | mǯveš-i-k | ʒvel-ma | ǯwinel-d | ǯveš-ep-k | mǯveš-epe-k | ʒvel-eb-ma | ǯwinel-är-d |
| Dative | ǯveš-s | mǯveš-i-s | ʒvel-s | ǯwinel-s | ǯveš-ep-s | mǯveš-i-epe-s | ʒvel-eb-s | ǯwinel-är-s |
| Genitive | ǯveš-iš | mǯveš-iš | ʒvel-is | ǯwinl-iš | ǯveš-ep-iš | mǯveš-epe-š | ʒvel-eb-is | ǯwinel-är-iš |
| Lative | ǯveš-iša | mǯveš-iša | —N/a | —N/a | ǯveš-ep-iša | mǯveš-epe-ša | —N/a | —N/a |
| Ablative | ǯveš-iše | mǯveš-iše | —N/a | —N/a | ǯveš-ep-iše | mǯveš-epe-še | —N/a | —N/a |
| Instrumental | ǯveš-it | mǯveš-ite | ʒvel-it | ǯwinel-šw | ǯveš-ep-it | mǯveš-epe-te | ʒvel-eb-it | ǯwinel-är-šw |
| Adverbial | ǯveš-o | mǯveš-ot | ʒvel-ad | ǯwinel-d | ǯveš-ep-o | —N/a | ʒvel-eb-ad | ǯwinel-är-d |
| Finalis | ǯveš-išo | —N/a | ʒvel-isad | ǯwinel-išd | ǯveš-ep-išo | —N/a | ʒvel-eb-isad | ǯwinel-är-išd |
| Vocative | —N/a | —N/a | ʒvel-o | —N/a | —N/a | —N/a | ʒvel-eb-o | —N/a |

=== Verb ===
Kartvelian verbs can indicate one, two, or three grammatical persons. A performer of an action is called the subject and affected persons are objects (direct or indirect). The person may be singular or plural. According to the number of persons, the verbs are classified as unipersonal, bipersonal or tripersonal.

- Unipersonal verbs have only a subject and so are always intransitive.
- Bipersonal verbs have a subject and one object, which can be direct or indirect. The verb is:
  - transitive when the object is direct;
  - intransitive if the object is indirect.
- Tripersonal verbs have one subject and both direct and indirect objects and are ditransitive.

Verb personality table
| | Unipersonal | Bipersonal | | Tripersonal |
| | intransitive | transitive | intransitive | ditransitive |
|---|---|---|---|---|
| Subject | + | + | + | + |
| Direct object | | + | | + |
| Indirect object | | | + | + |

Subjects and objects are indicated with special affixes.

Personal markers
Subject set
| | Singular | | | | Plural | | | |
| | Old Geo. | Mod. Geo. | Ming./Laz | Svan | Old Geo. | Mod. Geo. | Ming./Laz | Svan |
| S1 | v- | v- | v- | xw- | v-...-t | v-...-t | v-...-t | xw-...-(š)d (excl.) l-...-(š)d (incl.) |
| S2 | x/h- | ∅,(h/s)- | ∅ | x-/∅ | x/h-...-t | ∅,(h/s)-...-t | ∅-...-t | x/∅-...-(š)d |
| S3 | -s,-a/o,-n,-ed | -s,-a/o | -s,-u,-n | (l)-...-s/(a) | -an,-en,-es,-ed | -en,-an,-es | -an,-es | (l)-...-x |
Object set
| O1 | m- | m- | m- | m- | m- (excl.) gv- (incl.) | gv- | m-...-t,-an,-es | n- (excl.) gw- (incl.) |
| O2 | g- | g- | g- | ǯ- | g- | g-...-t | g-...-t,-an,-es | ǯ-...-x |
| O3 | x/h,∅- | ∅,s/h/∅- | ∅ | ∅,x- | x/h,∅- | ∅,s/h/∅-...-t | ∅-...-t,-an,-es | ∅,x-...-x |

By means of special markers Kartvelian verbs can indicate four kinds of action intentionality ("version"):

- subjective—shows that the action is intended for oneself,
- objective—the action is intended for another person,
- objective-passive—the action is intended for another person and at the same time indicating the passiveness of subject,
- neutral—neutral with respect to intention.

Version markers
| Version | Mingrelian | Laz | Georgian | Svan |
|---|---|---|---|---|
| Subjective | -i- | -i- | -i- | -i- |
| Objective | -u- | -u- | -u- | -o- |
| Objective-passive | -a- | -a- | -e- | -e- |
| Neutral | -o-/-a- | -o- | -a- | -a- |

=== Case patterns ===
Subject, direct object and indirect object are coded by the three core-cases, namely ergative, nominative and dative. Although the term "ergative" is traditional, strictly speaking no Kartvelian language features ergative alignment. Rather, they display a mixture of nominative-accusative and active alignment, depending on two factors:

- the class to which the verb belongs, based on its morphological and syntactic properties (class 1 including all transitive verbs, while intransitive verbs are divided between class 2 and 3);
- the series to which the tense/aspect/mood form (traditionally known as screeve) belongs.

Georgian and Svan have accusative alignment in the Present series (often termed Series I) and active alignment in the Aorist series (Series II).

Georgian and Svan
| | Subject | | | Direct object | Indirect object |
| | Class 1 | Class 3 | Class 2 | Direct object | Indirect object |
|---|---|---|---|---|---|
| Series I | Nominative | | | Dative | |
| Series II | Ergative | | Nominative | | Dative |

Laz has extended the case marking of Series II to Series I, thus featuring active alignment regardless of tense.

Laz
| | Subject | | | Direct object | Indirect object |
| | Class 1 | Class 3 | Class 2 | Direct object | Indirect object |
|---|---|---|---|---|---|
| Series I | Ergative | | Nominative | | Dative |
| Series II | Ergative | | Nominative | | Dative |

Mingrelian, on the other hand, has extended the use of the ergative to all intransitive verbs, becoming fully accusative in all series, although with different case marking.

Mingrelian
| | Subject | | | Direct object | Indirect object |
| | Class 1 | Class 3 | Class 2 | Direct object | Indirect object |
|---|---|---|---|---|---|
| Series I | Nominative | | | Dative | |
| Series II | Ergative | | | Nominative | Dative |

== Examples of vocabulary ==
Cardinal Numbers
| | Proto-Kartv. form | Karto-Zan | | | | Svan |
| | Proto-Kartv. form | Proto-form | Georgian | Mingrelian | Laz | Svan |
|---|---|---|---|---|---|---|
| 1. one, 2. other | *s₁xwa [ʂxwɑ] | *s₁xwa [ʂxwɑ] | sxva [sxvɑ] (other) | šxva [ʃxva] (other) | čkva / škva [t͡ʃkvɑ] / [ʃkvɑ] (other, one more) | e-šxu [ɛ-ʃxu] (one) |
| one | n/a | *erti [ɛrti] | erti [ɛrti] | arti [ɑrti] | ar [ɑr] | n/a |
| two | *yori [jɔri] | *yori [jɔri] | ori [ɔri] | žiri / žəri [ʒiri] / [ʒəri] | žur / ǯur [ʒur] / [d͡ʒur] | yori [jɔri] |
| three | *sami [sɑmi] | *sami [sɑmi] | sami [sɑmi] | sumi [sumi] | sum [sum] | semi [sɛmi] |
| four | *otxo [ɔtxɔ] | *otxo [ɔtxɔ] | otxi [ɔtxi] | otxi [ɔtxi] | otxo [ɔtxɔ] | w-oštxw [w-ɔʃtxw] |
| five | *xuti [xuti] | *xuti [xuti] | xuti [xuti] | xuti [xuti] | xut [xut] | wo-xušd [wɔ-xuʃd] |
| six | *eks₁wi [ɛkʂwi] | *eks₁wi [ɛkʂwi] | ekvsi [ɛkvsi] | amšvi [ɑmʃwi] | aši [ɑʃi] | usgwa [usɡwɑ] |
| seven | *šwidi [ʃwidi] | *šwidi [ʃwidi] | švidi [ʃvidi] | škviti [ʃkviti] | škvit [ʃkvit] | i-šgwid [i-ʃɡwid] |
| eight | *arwa [ɑrwɑ] | *arwa [ɑrwɑ] | rva [rvɑ] | ruo / bruo [ruɔ] / [bruɔ] | ovro / orvo [ɔvrɔ] / [ɔrvɔ] | ara [ɑrɑ] |
| nine | *ts₁xara [t͡ʂxɑrɑ] | *ts₁xara [t͡ʂxɑrɑ] | tsxra [t͡sxrɑ] | čxoro [t͡ʃxɔrɔ] | čxoro [t͡ʃxɔrɔ] | čxara [t͡ʃxɑrɑ] |
| ten | *a(s₁)ti [ɑ(ʂ)ti] | *ati [ɑti] | ati [ɑti] | viti [viti] | vit [vit] | ešd [ɛʃd] |
| twenty | n/a | *ots₁i [ɔt͡ʂi] | otsi [ɔt͡si] | etsi [ɛt͡ʃi] | etsi [ɛt͡ʃi] | n/a |
| hundred | *as₁i [ɑʂi] | *as₁i [ɑʂi] | asi [ɑsi] | oši [ɔʃi] | oši [ɔʃi] | aš-ir [ɑʃ-ir] |

Pronouns
Personal Pronouns
| | Proto-Kartv. | Georgian | Mingrelian | Laz | Svan |
|---|---|---|---|---|---|
| I | *me [mɛ] | me [mɛ] | ma [mɑ] | ma(n) [mɑ] | mi [mi] |
| You (sg.) | *sen [sɛn] | šen [ʃɛn] | si [si] | si(n) [si] | si [si] |
| That | *e- [ɛ-] | e-sa [ɛ-sɑ] | e-na [ɛ-nɑ] | (h)e-ya [(h)ɛ-jɑ] | e-ǯa [ɛ-d͡ʒɑ] |
| We | *čwen [t͡ʃwɛn] | čven [t͡ʃvɛn] | čki(n) / čkə(n) [t͡ʃki(n)] / [t͡ʃkə(n)] | čkin / čku / šku [t͡ʃkin] / [t͡ʃku] / [ʃku] | näy [næj] |
| You (pl.) | *stkwen [stkwɛn] | tkven [tkvɛn] | tkva(n) [tkvɑ(n)] | tkvan [tkvɑn] | sgäy [sɡæj] |
Possessive Pronouns
| | Proto-Kartv. | Georgian | Mingrelian | Laz | Svan |
| My | *č(w)e-mi [t͡ʃ(w)ɛ-mi] | če-mi [t͡ʃɛ-mi] | čki-mi [t͡ʃki-mi] | čki-mi / ški-mi [t͡ʃki-mi] / [ʃki-mi] | mi-šgu [mi-ʃɡu] |
| Your (sg.) | *š(w)eni [ʃ(w)ɛni] | šeni [ʃɛni] | skani [skɑni] | skani [skɑni] | i-sgu [i-sɡu] |
| His/her/its | *m-is₁ [m-iʂ] | m-is-i [m-is-i] | mu-š-i [mu-ʃ-i] | (h)e-mu-š-i [(h)ɛ-mu-ʃ-i] | m-ič-a [m-it͡ʃ-ɑ] |
| Our | *čweni [t͡ʃwɛni] | čveni [t͡ʃvɛni] | čkini / čkəni [t͡ʃkini] / [t͡ʃkəni] | čkini / čkuni / škuni [t͡ʃkini] / [t͡ʃkuni] / [ʃkuni] | gu-šgwey (excl.) [ɡu-ʃɡwɛj] ni-šgwey (incl.) [ni-ʃɡwɛj] |
| Your (pl.) | *stkweni [stkwɛni] | tkveni [tkvɛni] | tkvani [tkvɑni] | tkvani [tkvɑni] | i-sgwey [i-sɡwɛj] |

Various lexical examples in the Kartvelian languages
| English | Georgian | Mingrelian | Laz | Svan |
|---|---|---|---|---|
| hello | gamarjoba | gomordzgua | geǯginoba/xelaǩaoba | xoča ladeġ |
| I love you | me šen miyvarxar | ma si miork | ma si maoropen | mi si malat |
| thanks | madloba | mardi | mardi | makhvmar |
| yes | ki/xo | ko | ho | ādu |
| no | ara | var | var | bai |
| here | ak | tak | hak | ame |
| am | var | vorek | vore | xwäri |
| there | ik | tek | ek | eče |
| outside; out | gare | gale | gale | qāme |
| drink | sasmeli | ošumali | ošumali | letre |
| food | sač̣meli | oč̣komali | oçǩomali | lezǖeb |
| and | da | do | do | i |
| near | axlo | xolo | xolo | sgakhi |
| god | ɣmerti | ɣoronti | ğormoti | ɣērbet |
| fate; luck | bedi | bedi | bedi | bed |
| happy; lucky | bednieri | bedineri | bedineri | bēdnier/ləhäj |
| wheel | borbali | barbali | barbali | barbōld |
| heart | guli | guri | guri | gwi |
| boy | bič̣i | boši | bič̣i | č̣q̇inṭ |
| sister | da | da | da | dačûir |
| grandfather | ṗaṗa/babua | ṗaṗu | p̌ap̌u | baba |
| grandmother | bebia | bebi | didinana | bebe |
| son-in-law; bridegroom | siʒe | sinǯa | sica | čiže |
| red | c̣iteli | č̣ita | mçita | c̣ərni |
| yellow | q̇viteli | q̇vinteli | sǩita | q̇ûitel |
| old | ʒveli | ǯveši | mjveşi | ǯûinel |
| new | axali | axali | ağani | maxe |
| fox | mela | mela | meli | māl |
| sand | kviša | kviša | kviša | qûishe |
| shepherd | mc̣q̇emsi | č̣q̇iši | mç̌ǩeşi | məldegh |
| hand | xeli | xe | xe | ši |
| size | zoma | zoma | zoma | nazim |
| apiece; each | tito | tito | tito | tẅit |
| low; short | dabali | dabali | tapala | dambāl |
| turtle | ḳu | ḳu | ḳu | ḳu |
| angle; corner | ḳutxe | ḳuntxu | ḳutxe | ḳutxẅ |
| relative | naṭesavi | naṭese | noṭase | nāṭi |
| big | didi | didi | didi | xoša |
| short | moḳle | mǩule | mǩule | mekušde |
| weight | c̣ona | c̣onua | oǯonu | c̣ən |
| broken; fragment(s) | naṭexi | noṭexi | noṭexi | näküish |
| laugh | sicili | ʒica | ożiʒinu | līcû |
| lightning | elva | valua | ovalu | hel |
| goat | txa | txa | txa | dakhəl |
| crane (bird) | c̣ero | c̣ero | ç̌aro | c̣ǟrû |
| ear | q̇uri | q̇uǯi | q̇uǯi | šdim |
| nose | cxviri | čxvindi | čxvindi | nepxwna |
| stem | ɣero | ɣeri | ğeri | ɣēr |
| meat | xorci | xorci | xorci | leɣw |
| spoon | ḳovzi | ḳizi | ǩizi | ḳiz |
| hoe | toxi | torxi | toxi | bērg |
| tooth | ḳbili | ḳibiri | ḳibiri | šdik |
| fingernail | prčxili | bircxa | burcxa | cxa |
| hear | smena | siminua | osiminu | lisme |
| dig | txra | txorua | ontxoru | lištxar |
| swim | curva | čurua | ončuru | lilcune |
| give | micema | mečama | mečamu | lihwdi |
| round | mrgvali | rgvali | morgvali | murgual/ḳurṗi |
| walk | svla | ula | ulu | lizāl |
| say | tkma | tkuma | otku | liqle |
| straight | sc̣ori | c̣ori | c̣ori | mec̣win |
| fruit | xili | xili | xila | xil |
| sky | ca | ca | mca | cǟš |
| rope | toḳi | toḳi | toç̌i | täḳû |
| tail | ḳudi | ḳudeli | ḳudeli | haḳûäd |
| mouth | ṗiri | ṗiǯi | p̌ici | ṗil |
| year | c̣eli | c̣ana | ǯana | zäy |
| stomach | kuči | kuči | kuči | kuiw |
| rain | c̣vima | č̣vima | mç̌vima | učxa |
| blood | sisxli | zisxiri | diʒxiri | zisx |
| smoke | ḳvamli | ḳuma | ǩoma | ḳûäm |
| language | ena | nina | nena | nən |
| sun | mze | bža | mžora | məž |
| forest | ṭq̇e | ṭq̇a | mt̆ǩa | tskhek |
| sea | zġva | zuġa | zuġa | ʒuġwa |
| king | mepe | mapa | mapa | nepe |
| day | dġe | dġa | ndġa | la-deġ |
| brother | ʒma | ǯima | ǯuma | ǯəmil |
| daughter | asuli | osurskua | osuri | hasûiš |
| bear | datvi | tunti | mtuti | däštw |
| maggot | maṭli | munṭuri | munťuri | məṭ |
| dog | ʒaɣli | ǯoɣori | coğori | žeɣ |
| bull | xari | xoǯi | xoǯi | qän |
| insect | mc̣eri | č̣andi | mč̣aǯi | mēr |
| cup | tasi | tasi | tasi | täs |
| fence | ɣobe | ɣoberi | ğoberi | ɣob |
| millet | peṭvi | paṭi | paťi | peṭû |
| apple | vašli | uškur | oškuri | ûisgû |
| pear | mskhali | skhuli | mcxuli | vicx |
| elderberry | anc̣li | inč̣iri | inč̣iri | gänč̣w |
| wool | maṭq̇li | monṭq̇ori | monṭḳori | mäṭq̇ |
| leather | ṭq̇avi | ṭq̇ebi | ťǩebi | tup |
| milk | rʒe | bža | mža | ləǯe |
| thin | txeli | txitxu | titxu | dətxel |
| chicken | qatami | kotomi | kotomi | qatal |
| horse | cxeni | cxeni | cxeni | č̣až |
| wife | coli | čili | çili | xexw |
| man | kaci | koči | koči | mare |
| mother | deda | dida | nana | di |
| father | mama | muma | muma | mu |
| road, way | gza | za | gza | šukw |
| eye | tvali | toli | toli | te |
| billy-goat | vaci | oči | boči | fiku |
| hair | tma | toma | toma | pät |
| water | wyali | wyari | wkari | lic |
| stone | qva | qva | kva | q̣wa |
| honey | tafli | tofuri | tofuri | tui |
| lake | tba | toba | tiba | ṭûib |
| ravine | ɣele | ɣali | ğali | ɣel |
| name | saxeli | saxeli | joxo | jaxe |
| iron | rḳina | rḳina | erǩina | berež |
| gold | okro | orko | okro | ûokr |
| silver | vercxli | varčxili | baçxuri | ûarčxil |

== See also ==
- Proto-Kartvelian language

== General references ==
- Boeder, Winfried (1979). "Ergative syntax and morphology in language change: the South Caucasian languages". In Plank, Frans (ed.). Ergativity: towards a theory of grammatical relations. London: Academic Press. pp. 435–480. ISBN 9780125581509.
- Boeder, Winfried (2002). "Speech and thought representation in the Kartvelian (South Caucasian) languages". In Güldemann, Tom; von Roncador, Manfred (eds.). Reported Discourse. A Meeting-Ground of Different Linguistic Domains. Typological Studies in Language, vol. 52. Amsterdam/Philadelphia: John Benjamins Publishing. pp. 3–48. ISBN 9789027229588.
- Boeder, Winfried (2005). "The South Caucasian languages". Lingua. 115 (1–2): 5–89. doi:10.1016/j.lingua.2003.06.002.
- Dalby, A. (2002). Language in Danger; The Loss of Linguistic Diversity and the Threat to Our Future. Columbia University Press. ISBN 9780231129008.
- Yardumian, Aram; Schurr, Theodore G. (2025). The Peopling of the Caucasus: Early Human Settlement at the Crossroads of Continents. Cambridge; New York: Cambridge University Press. doi:10.1017/9781009520201. ISBN 978-1-009-52020-1.
- Deeters, Gerhard (1930). Das kharthwelische Verbum: vergleichende Darstellung des Verbalbaus der südkaukasischen Sprachen (in German). Leipzig: Markert und Petters. OCLC 751319764.
- Delshad, Farshid (2010). Georgica et Irano-Semitica (in German). Wiesbaden: Deutscher Wissenschaftsverlag. ISBN 978-3868880045.
- Fähnrich, Heinz (2002). Kartwelische Wortschatzstudien (in German). Jena: Friedrich-Schiller-Universität.
- Fähnrich, Heinz (2007). Kartwelisches Etymologisches Wörterbuch (in German). Leiden: Brill. ISBN 978-90-47-42032-3.
- Blažek, Václav; Krpcová, Šárka (2007). "On the Application of Glottochronology to Kartvelian languages". Mother Tongue. 12: 125–133.
- Fähnrich, Heinz (2008). Kartwelsprachen. Altgeorgisch, Neugeorgisch, Mingrelisch, Lasisch, Swanisch (in German). Wiesbaden: Reichert. ISBN 978-3-89500-653-1.
- Fähnrich, Heinz (2016). Die Kartwelier. Grundsprache, Kultur, Lebensraum (in German). Wiesbaden: Reichert. ISBN 978-3-95490-192-0.
- Gamkrelidze, Thomas (1966). "A Typology of Common Kartvelian". Language. 42 (1): 69–83. doi:10.2307/411601. JSTOR 411601.
- Gamkrelidze, Thomas; Ivanov, Vjaceslav V. (1995). Indo-European and the Indo-Europeans: A Reconstruction and Historical Analysis of a Proto-Language and a Proto-Culture. 2 vols. Translated by Jakobson, Roman. Berlin / New York: Mouton de Gruyter. ISBN 9783110147285.
- Harris, Alice C. (1985). Diachronic syntax: the Kartvelian case. London: Academic Press. ISBN 978-90-04-36508-7.
- Harris, Alice C., ed. (1991). The Indigenous Languages of the Caucasus, Vol.1: The Kartvelian languages. Delmar, New York: Caravan Books.
- Hewitt, B. George (1995). Georgian: A Structural Reference Grammar. Amerstdam/Philadelphia: John Benjamins Publishing. ISBN 978-90-272-3802-3.
- Kajaia, Otar (2001). Megrul-kartuli leksiḳoni [Megrelian-Georgian dictionary] (in Georgian). Vol. 1.
- Kartozia, Guram (2005). The Laz language and its place in the system of Kartvelian languages (in Georgian). Tbilisi: Nekeri.
- Klimov, Georgij (1964). Этимологический словарь картвельских языков [Etymological Dictionary of Kartvelian Languages] (in Russian).
- Klimov, Georgij (1994). Einführung in die kaukasische Sprachwissenschaft [Introduction to Caucasian linguistics] (in German). Translated by Gippert, Jost. Hamburg: Buske. ISBN 9783875480603.
- Kohl, Philip L. (2007). The Making of Bronze Age Eurasia. Cambridge: Cambridge University Press. ISBN 978-0-521-84780-3.
- Klimov, Georgij (1998). Etymological Dictionary of the Kartvelian Languages. Berlin/New York: Mouton de Gruyter. ISBN 9783110156584.
- Klimov, Georgij (1998). Languages of the World: Caucasian languages (in Russian). Moscow: Academia.
- Lang, David Marshall (1966). The Georgians. Ancient people and places No. 51. New York: Praeger. ISBN 9780500020494.
- Ruhlen, M. (1987). A Guide to the World's Languages, Vol. 1: Classification. Stanford, CA: Stanford University Press.
- Testelets, Yakov G. (2020). "Kartvelian (South Caucasian) Languages". In Polinsky, Maria (ed.). The Oxford Handbook of Languages of the Caucasus. Oxford Handbooks Series. Oxford: Oxford University Press. ISBN 9780190690694.
- Tuite, K. (1998). Kartvelian Morphosyntax. Number agreement and morphosyntactic orientation in the South Caucasian languages. Studies in Caucasian Linguistics, 12. Munich: LINCOM Europa.
