= Ateni Theotokos Church inscription =

Georgian inscription

Ateni Theotokos Church Georgian inscription
- Writing: Georgian script
- Created: 982–989
- Discovered: 1940
- Language: Old Georgian

The Ateni Theotokos Church inscription (Georgian: ატენის ღვთისმშობლის ეკლესიის წარწერა) is the Georgian language inscription written in the Georgian Asomtavruli script on the Ateni Theotokos Church, a basilica located in the village of Didi Ateni, Gori Municipality, Shida Kartli, Georgia. The inscriptions are dated 982–989 AD. The inscription mentions Rati I and Liparit II, Dukes of Kldekari.

== Inscription ==
ႵႤ ႠႣႨႣႤ ႭႰႱႠ
ႥႤ ႺႾႭႥႰႤႡႠႱႠ
ႠႵႠ ჄႭႰႺႨႤႪႤႡ
Ⴐ ႣႠ ႼႤ ႸႬႱႠ ႱႳႪ
ႨႤႡႰ ႰႠႲ ႤႰႨႱႧ
ႠႥႨ ႻႤ ႨႢႨ ႪႮႰႲ
ႤႰႨႱႧႥႨႱႠႨ ႰႪႬ
ႠႶႠႸႤႬႠ ႤႱႤ ႱႠႾ
ႪႨ ႶႧႨႱႠႨ ႣႠ ႡႽႤႨ
ႺႠႧႠႨ ႼႨ ႤႩႪႤႱႨ
ႠႨ ႱႠႪႭႺႥႤႪႠႣ
ႱႳႪႨႱႠ ႫႧႨႱႠ

- Translation: "Jesus Christ, have mercy on both of the worldly lives, bodily and spiritual, of Rati Eristavi, son of Liparit Eristavi, who built this house of God as a rock of Sky, a holy Church, for praying for their souls."
