= Bolnisi cross =

Symbol of Georgia taken from the Bolnisi Sioni church

Bolnisi inscriptions are second oldest extant samples of the Georgian script. The "Bolnisi Cross" appears at the center.

The Bolnisi cross (Georgian: ბოლნური ჯვარი bolnuri ǰvari) is a cross symbol, taken from a 5th-century ornament at the Bolnisi Sioni church, which came to be used as a national symbol of Georgia.

It is a variant of the cross pattée popular in Christian symbolism of late antiquity and the early medieval period. The same symbol gave rise to cross variants used during the Crusades, the Maltese cross of the Knights Hospitaller and (via the Jerusalem cross and the Black cross of the Teutonic Order) the Iron cross used by the German military.

The four small crosses used in the Georgian flag are officially described as bolnur-kacʼxuri (bolnur-katskhuri, ბოლნურ-კაცხური) even though they are only slightly pattée.

== See also ==
- Grapevine cross
- Christian cross variants

== Bibliography ==
- Michael Tarchnišvili: Geschichte der kirchlichen georgischen Literatur (= Studi e Testi. 185, ZDB-ID 762276-4). Auf Grund des 1. Bandes der georgischen Literaturgeschichte von K. Kekelidze bearbeitet. Biblioteca Apostolica Vaticana, Città del Vaticano 1955.
- Elene Mačavariani: Bolnisis sionis samšeneblo carcera. Mec'niereba, T'bilisi 1985, (In georgischer Schrift. Zusammenfassung in russischer und französischer Sprache).
- Gross, Andreas (1998). Missionare und Kolonisten: die Basler und die Hermannsburger Mission in Georgien am Beispiel der Kolonie Katharinenfeld 1818-1870 (Thesis). Hamburg: LIT. ISBN 3825837289. (Zugleich: Marburg, Universität, Dissertation, 1998).
- Rosen, Roger (1999). Georgia: a sovereign country of the Caucasus. Geographic expeditions. Hong Kong: Odyssey Publ. ISBN 978-962-217-502-0..
