= Liber Annuus =

Theological-archaeological journal

- Discipline: Theology and biblical archaeology
- Language: English
- Edited by: L. Daniel Chrupcała

Publication details
- History: 1951-present
- Publisher: Studium Biblicum Franciscanum (Israel)
- Frequency: Yearly

Standard abbreviations
- ISO 4: Liber Annu.

Indexing
- ISSN: 0081-8933
- OCLC no.: 183335303

Links
- Journal homepage

Liber Annuus is a yearly academic journal of theology and Biblical archaeology published by Studium Biblicum Franciscanum in Jerusalem. The first issue appeared in 1951. One of its founders was the Italian archaeologist, Franciscan Bellarmino Bagatti.
