= Greco-Georgian mosaic of Mount Zion =

Greco-Georgian mosaic inscription

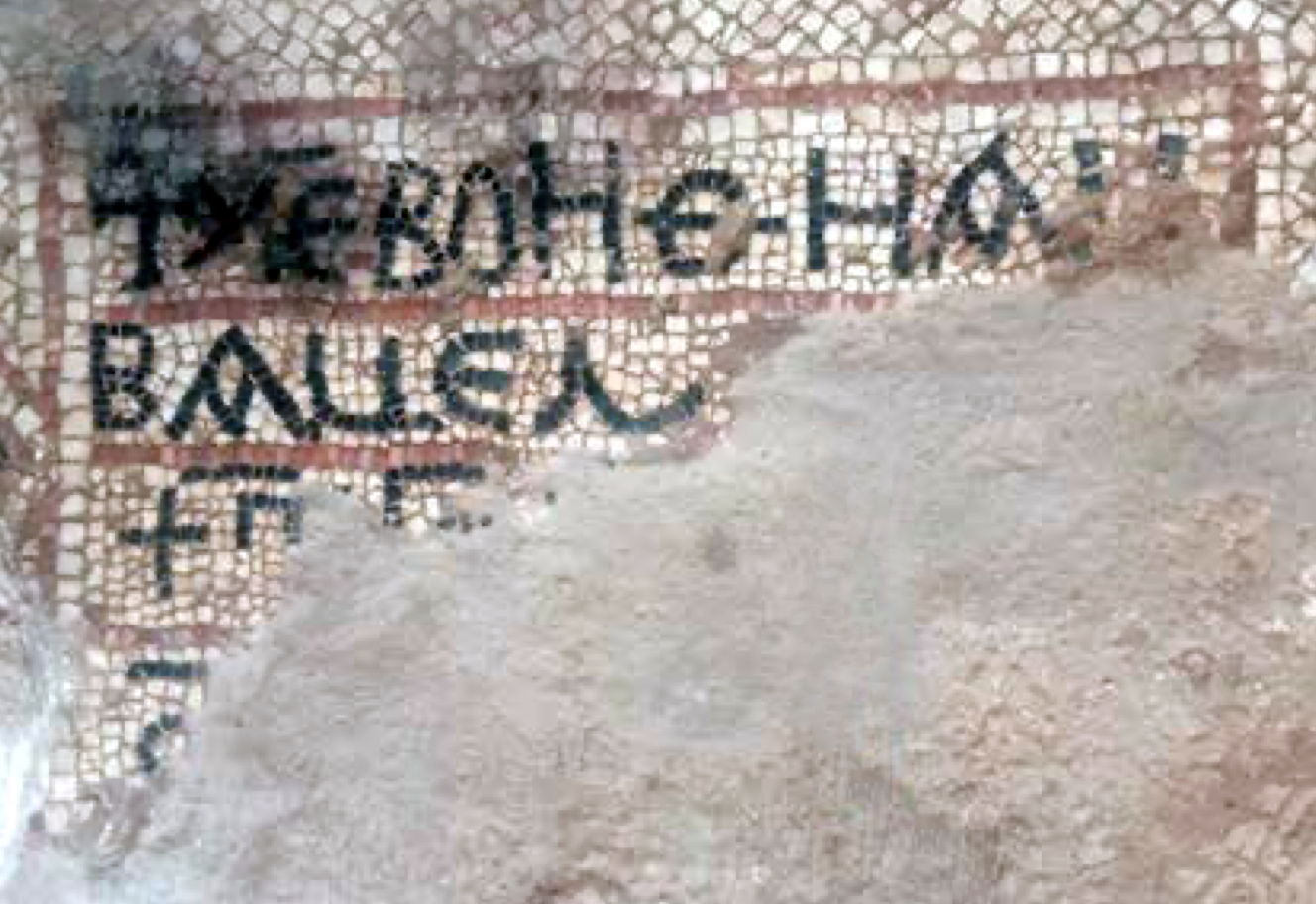
- Material: mosaic
- Size: 47 × 82 cm
- Writing: Greek script Georgian script
- Created: V century
- Language: Ancient Greek; Old Georgian

The Greco-Georgian mosaic of Mount Zion (Georgian: სიონის მთის ბერძნულ-ქართული მოზაიკა, romanized: sionis mtis berdznul-kartuli mozaik'a) is a bilingual mosaic, in Ancient Greek and Old Georgian, inscriptions written in Greek and Georgian Asomtavruli scripts, found during 2020–2021 archaeological excavation on the southern part of Mount Zion in Jerusalem.

The partially preserved bilingual mosaic inscription was set in a rectangular tabula ansata, where the frame and the dividing lines between the four lines of the inscriptions were made of red tesserae on a white background. The Greek and Georgian letters were executed in black tesserae. The mosaic was set in a bed of light gray mortar on a thin layer of compacted earth on bedrock. The mosaic is dated terminus post quem, no earlier than the fifth century.

An archaeological site and location of an excavated mosaic is identified as the "Monastery of the Iberians" built by Peter the Iberian, supported by the Byzantine written sources including Life of Peter the Iberian by John Rufus and De aedificiis of Justinian by Procopius of Caesarea. (Note: Based on this inscription, the early written records and the corresponding archaeological remains, the monastic site was built in the fifth century, restored in the reign of emperor Justinian and completely ceased of its existence by the beginning of the ninth century. The excavation unearthed archaeological evidence of several destruction levels on the site whereby the entire building complex was found covered with a mass of building stones and broken tiles. This destruction may be related to 749 Galilee earthquake that got the site totally abandoned and never rebuilt again.)

== Inscription ==
The mosaic inscription consists of four lines of text, of which only the first line is completely preserved. The first two lines are in Greek, and the last, extremely damaged two, are in Georgian. Only four letters were preserved in Georgian.

=== Greek text ===
Χ(ριστ)ὲ βοήηθη ἄ[μ̣-]
βα Μελλ[ίττᾳ]?[…]

Translation: Christ, help Abba Mell[itas?][…]

=== Georgian text ===
ႵႤ Ⴘ[…]
Ⴋ[…]

ke sh
m

Translation: Christ, have mercy[…]M[…]

== See also ==
- Bir el Qutt inscriptions
- Georgian graffiti of Nazareth and Sinai
- Epitaph of Samuel

== Bibliography ==
- Michael Chernin (2023) A Bilingual Greek-Georgian Inscription from Mount Zion, Jerusalem, and the Location of the “Monastery of the Iberians", Israel Antiquities Authority, Atiqot, Publications Portal, Volume 110, Article 14, The Ancient Written World, DOI: doi.org/10.70967/2948-040X.1089
