= Bellarmino Bagatti =

Italian archaeologist and priest

The Reverend Bellarmino Bagatti
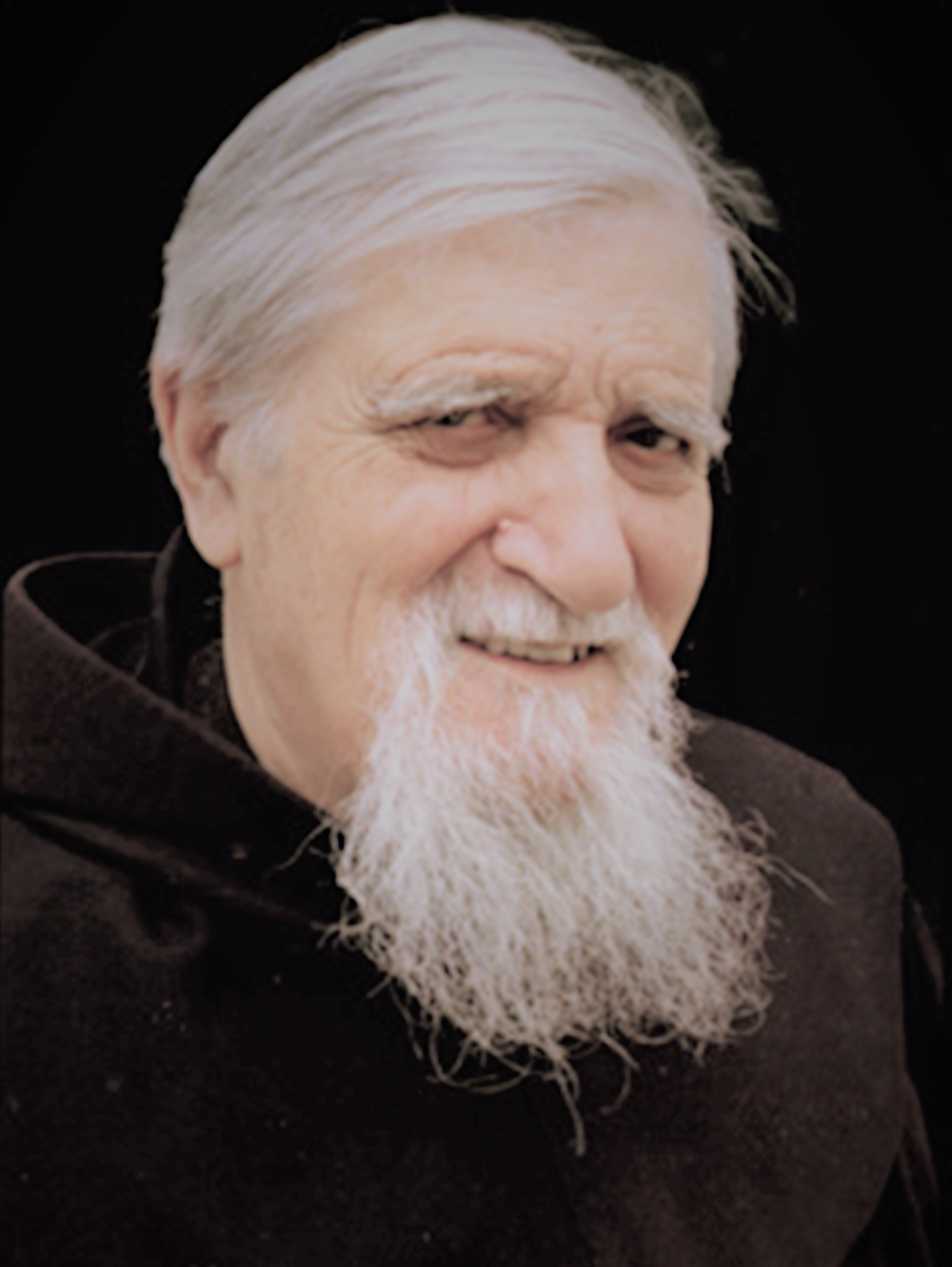
- Born: Camillo Bellarmino Bagatti; November 11, 1905; Province of Pisa, Kingdom of Italy
- Died: October 7, 1990 (aged 84); Monastery of Saint Saviour, Jerusalem
- Burial place: Mount Zion Cemetery, Jerusalem
- Education: Pontifical Academy of Archaeology
- Occupation: Archeologist
- Known for: Discovering the Georgian graffiti of Nazareth and Sinai
- Religion: Christianity
- Church: Catholic
- Ordained: 1928
- Title: Director of the Studium Biblicum Franciscanum

Bellarmino Bagatti (November 11, 1905 – October 7, 1990) was a 20th-century Italian archaeologist and Catholic priest of the Franciscan Order.

== Life ==
Camillo Bellarmino Bagatti was born in 1905 in the province of Pisa. At the age of 17 he made his solemn profession in the Order of Friars Minor in the Province of San Francesco on Monte della Verna in Tuscany. In 1928, at the age of 23, he was ordained a priest.

Dedicated from a young age to the Franciscan art, he was trained in archaeological research at the Pontifical Academy of Archaeology, where he graduated (magna cum laude) in June 1934 with an important thesis on the Roman catacomb of Commodilla.

From 1935 he was professor of Jerusalem topography and Christian archaeology at the Studium Biblicum Franciscanum in Jerusalem where he played, from the beginning, a role of great importance in the publication of unpublished itineraries of the Holy Land, and the archaeological exploration of ancient Christian shrines.

In 1941, with Father Sylvester Saller, he began the series Studium Biblicum Franciscanum Collectio Maior and in 1951, with Father Donato Baldi, he founded the magazine Studium Biblicum Franciscanum Liber Annuus. During the Second World War, he was interned by the British authorities, along with other Franciscans of Italian and German nationality, in the internment camp of Emmaus-Qubeibeh.

In the decade 1968–1978 he was Director of the Studium and for many years he was also a teacher in the International Theological Study of the Custody of the Holy Land. In the academic year 1973-74 he wanted to celebrate the fiftieth anniversary of the foundation of the Studium and his work was rewarded with a significant letter of gratitude that Cardinal Jean Villot, Secretary of State, addressed to the Minister General of the Order on behalf of Pope Paul VI. He died on October 7, 1990, in the Franciscan Convent of St. Saviour in Jerusalem.

Since 1997 he has been buried in the cemetery of Mount Zion in Jerusalem.

== Archaeological excavations ==
Bagatti was responsible for numerous excavation campaigns in Italy, Palestine, Israel and Jordan; with his studies he made a decisive contribution to the progress of biblical archaeology in the field of Palestinology.

- Rome: Cemetery of Commodilla (1933–34)
- Jordan: Mount Nebo (1935)
  - Khirbet al-Mukhayyat (at different times)
- Israel and Palestine
  - Church of the Beatitudes (1936)
  - Church of the Visitation at Ein Karem (1938)
  - Emmaus-Qubeibeh (1940–44)
  - Church of the Nativity, Bethlehem (1948)
  - Dominus Flevit on the Mount of Olives (1953–55)
  - Basilica of the Annunciation, Nazareth (1954-1971)
  - Georgian graffiti of Nazareth and Sinai (1955-1960)
  - Stella Maris Monastery, Mount Carmel (1960–61)

=== Dominus Flevit ===
In 1953 the Franciscans began construction of wall on property they held on the Mount of Olives. While digging the foundations, workers unearthed ancient tombs. Excavations began at the site, led by Fr. Bellarmino Bagatti, OFM. Over the course of the next two years a Canaanite tomb from the Late Bronze Age, as well as a necropolis used from 136 BC to AD 300 were discovered. A Byzantine monastery from the 5th century was also discovered. Mosaics from this monastery still remain at the site which is now occupied by the Dominus Flevit Church.

=== Nazareth ===
Bagatti carried out extensive excavation at Nazareth from 1954 to 1971 and uncovered pottery dating from the Middle Bronze Age (2200 to 1500 BC) and ceramics, silos and grinding mills from the Iron Age (1500 to 586 BC) which indicated substantial settlement in the Nazareth basin at that time. He also unearthed quantities of later Roman and Byzantine artifacts. His discoveries indicate that the village now known as Nazareth was no more than a small hamlet in the 1st century. Bagatti found a number of kokh-type tombs in the Nazareth area.

== Works ==
Among his writings are:

- Excavations in Nazareth, Volume 1, From the Beginning till the XII Century (1971) and volume II, From the 12th century until Today
- The church from the circumcision: history and archaeology of the Judaeo-Christians.

His thesis on the Church of Zion, Jerusalem (1976) gained the support of Emmanuel Testa but is not generally accepted by the majority of archeologists.
