= Corpus Inscriptionum Iudaeae/Palaestinae =

Books documenting ancient inscriptions from historic Palestine

- Region: Ancient Judaea/Palaestina
- Period: 4th century BC to 7th century CE
- Languages: ancient Greek and Latin ('sovereign languages'); Semitic; Hebrew; Phoenician; Aramaic; Jewish, Samaritan, Nabataean, Northern Syriac and Southern Syriac/Christian Palestinian Aramaic; Old Arabic; Thamudic and Safaitic; Armenian and Georgian
- Volumes: Vol. I: Jerusalem, Part 1 (2010), Part 2 (2012); Vol. II: Caesarea and the Middle Coast (2010); Vol. III: South Coast (2010); Vol. IV: Iudaea/Idumaea (2010); Vol. V: Galilaea and Northern Regions, Part 1 and Part 2 (2023); Vols. VI-X (planned)

Corpus Inscriptionum Iudaeae/Palaestinae (Corpus of Inscriptions of Judea/Palestine, abbreviated CIIP) is a series of books documenting almost all the ancient inscriptions from the fourth century BC to the seventh century CE discovered on the territory of ancient Judaea/Syria Palaestina (the Palestine region) and studied primarily by Israeli scientists. Excluded are areas in modern Syria and Jordan covered by two similar dedicated publications (Inscriptions grecques et latines de la Syrie and Inscriptions grecques et latines de la Jordanie). The early Arabic inscriptions which postdate the Muslim conquest are also not included and make the subject of Corpus Inscriptionum Arabicarum Palaestinae (CIAP). CIIP is thus "a multi-lingual corpus of the inscriptions from Alexander to Muhammad", as indicated by the subtitle.

== Languages ==
Inscriptions are in several different languages and dialects, including ancient Greek and Latin used as 'sovereign languages'; the local Semitic languages: Hebrew, Phoenician, various Aramaic dialects (Jewish, Samaritan, Nabataean, Northern and Southern Syriac, the latter also known as Christian Palestinian Aramaic), and Old Arabic languages (Thamudic and Safaitic); and ending with Armenian and Georgian.

== Index ==
The corpus is planned to consist of ten "volumes" (some split into multiple parts) and document inscriptions from following regions and topics (publication year added at the end):

- Vol. I: Jerusalem - with surroundings, 2010 (Part 1) & 2012 (Part 2)
- Vol. II: Caesarea and the Middle Coast - central coastal plain, 2010
- Vol. III: South Coast - Jaffa and the southern coastal plain, 2010
- Vol. IV: Iudaea/Idumaea - without Jerusalem (see vol. I)
- Vol. V: Galilaea and Northern Regions - including the southern coastal plain with Acre, 2023 (Part 1 & Part 2)
- the Golan Heights
- Samaria
- the Negev
- milestones

== Project details ==
The initial researcher team included Prof. Hannah Cotton, Chair of Classics at the Hebrew University, Prof. Jonathan Price from Tel Aviv University, and a team of German researchers led by Professors Werner Eck and Walter Ameling. The project was conceived and planned in 1997, and was at that time mostly funded by the German Research Foundation, which gave the project a million euros.

== See also ==
- Archaeology of Israel
- Archaeology of Palestine
- Corpus Inscriptionum Semiticarum (1881-1962)
