= Bir el Qutt inscriptions =

Old Georgian Byzantine mosaic

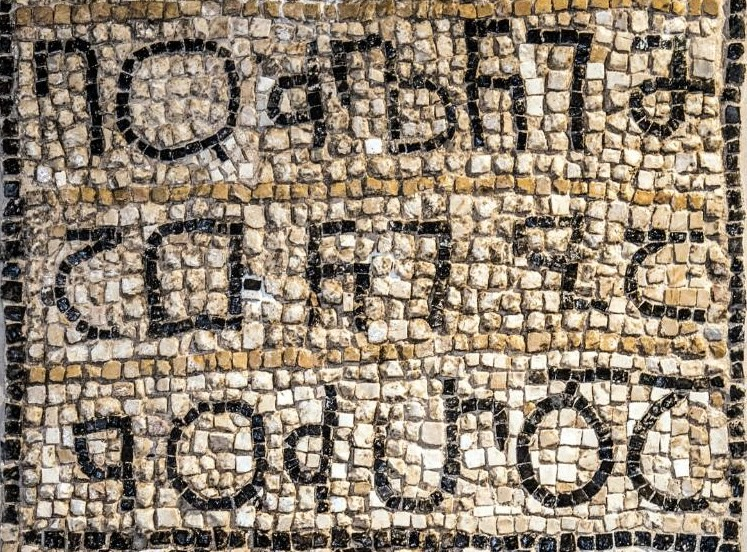
- Inscription 1 at the Terra Sancta Museum
- Material: Mosaic
- Size: 98 cm × 45 cm (39 in × 18 in) (inscription 1)
- Writing: Georgian script
- Created: AD 430 (1596 years ago) (inscription 1 & 2); AD 532 (1494 years ago) (inscription 3 & 4)
- Discovered: 1952, by Virgilio Canio Corbo
- Present location: Studium Biblicum Franciscanum, Jerusalem
- Language: Old Georgian

The Bir el Qutt inscriptions (Georgian: ბირ ელ ქუტის წარწერები, romanized: bir el kut'is ts'arts'erebi) are four Old Georgian Byzantine mosaic inscriptions in the Asomtavruli script. They were excavated at a Saint Theodore Tiron Georgian Orthodox monastery in 1952 by Italian archaeologist Virgilio Canio Corbo near Bir el Qutt, in the Judaean Desert, 6 km (3.7 mi) south-east of Jerusalem and 2 km (1.2 mi) north of Bethlehem.

The complex was built of reddish limestone. The excavations has also revealed a monastery which produced wine and olive oil. Georgian inscriptions were found on a mosaic floor decorated with geometrical and floral patterns. The first two inscriptions are dated AD 430, while the last two AD 532. The excavations of Bir el Qutt conditioned discovery of inscriptions where only one has survived completely while others lack parts of the mosaic that suffered significant damage. The inscriptions in memoriam mention Peter the Iberian alongside his father, and also Bacurius the Iberian who is thought to be a possible maternal great-uncle or grandfather of Peter. Peter reputedly was the founder or the renovator of the monastery. Peter's aristocratic descent would allow him easy access to various persons of power and prestige in Constantinople, Jerusalem and other places, to actively develop Georgian monastic establishments. At the end of the eighth century the monastery was completely abandoned.

So far, the first two carvings are the oldest extant Georgian inscriptions. The inscriptions are kept at the Terra Sancta Museum of the Studium Biblicum Franciscanum in Jerusalem. Inscription 2 mentioning Peter the Iberian is currently missing and is deemed to be lost.

== Inscriptions ==
=== Inscription 1 ===
ႣႠႻႭჃႻ
ႤႭჃႪႬႨႫ
ႠႧႬႨႡႠ
ႩႭჃႰႣႠ
ႢႰႨႭႰႫ
ႨႦႣႣႠႬ
ႠႸႭႡႬႨ
ႫႠႧႬႨႵ

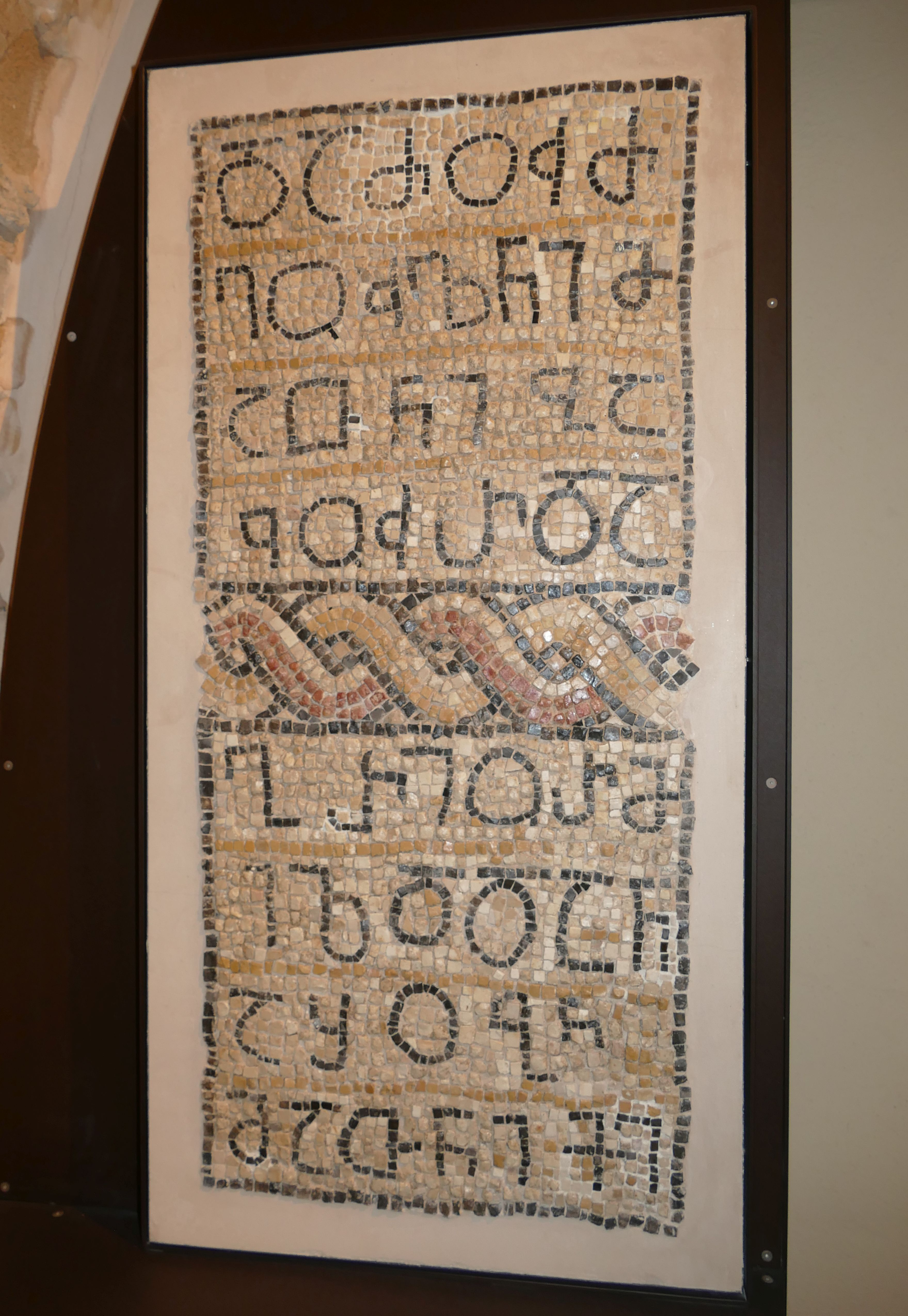
Inscription 1

dadzudz
eulnim
atniba
kʼurda
griorm
izddan
ashobni
matnik

Translation: Jesus Christ, have mercy on Bakur and Griormizd and their descendants.

This inscription was discovered to the west of the colonnade of central yard. The letters were arranged within three squares with black pebbles on white background. The carving of the inscription also differentiates from the other ones as the letters are comparatively rough. The text of the inscription is rather short, but an interesting thing is that out of two persons mentioned in the text the name of one of them repeats the name of prominent possible grandfather of Peter, Bakur the Iberian. The second person "Gri Ormizd" mentioned in the inscription is unknown, although as the inscription explains they were friends or relatives who grew up together.

=== Inscription 2 ===
ႼႫႨႣႠႭႧႤႭႣႭႰ
ႤႫႠႰႭჃႠႬႣႠႡႭ
ჃႰႦႬ[…]ႤႬႠႫႨ[…]Ⴄ

tsʼmidaoteodor
emarndabu
rzn[…]enami[…]e

Translation: Saint Theodore, have mercy on Maruan and Burzen, Amen.

Maruan was a secular name of Peter the Iberian. His father is mentioned as Burzen. Syriac edition of the 6th century “Vita” of Peter provides their names as "Nabarnugios" and "Buzmarios", while the 13th century Georgian edition of the Vita refers them as "Murvanos" and "Varaz-Bakur" respectively. It is assumed that these names in Syriac edition have the Greek ending "-os". Buzmar is the same name as Buzmihr and it is concluded that full name of the father of Peter was to be "Burzen-Mihr". The name "Varaz-Bakur" is thought to be the mistake made by the author of Georgian edition. "Burzen" represents the Parthian form and is represented with many various forms in different sources such as Burzin, Burz, Borzin, Barzi, Barzen, Baraz, Barza. Syriac edition has secular name of Peter as John Rufus mentions Peter in the text as "Nabarnugios". John being his contemporary and follower, was certainly aware of a real name of his spiritual confessor prior to becoming the monk. Peter being referenced under the inscription by his secular name does signify that the inscription itself had been made before Peter entered the monkhood.

=== Inscription 3 ===
ႸႤႼႤႥႬႨႧႠႵჁႱႨႧႠႣႠႫ
ႤႭႾႤႡႨႧႠႼႫႨႣႨႱႠႣႠႧႤჂႱႨႧႠ
ႸႬႠႬႲႭႬႨႠႡႠჂႣႠႨႭႱႨႠႫႭ
ႫႱႾႫႤႪႨႠႫႨႱႱႤႴႨႱႠჂႣႠႫႠ
ႫႠႣႤႣႠჂႨႭႱႨႠჂႱႨႠႫႤႬ

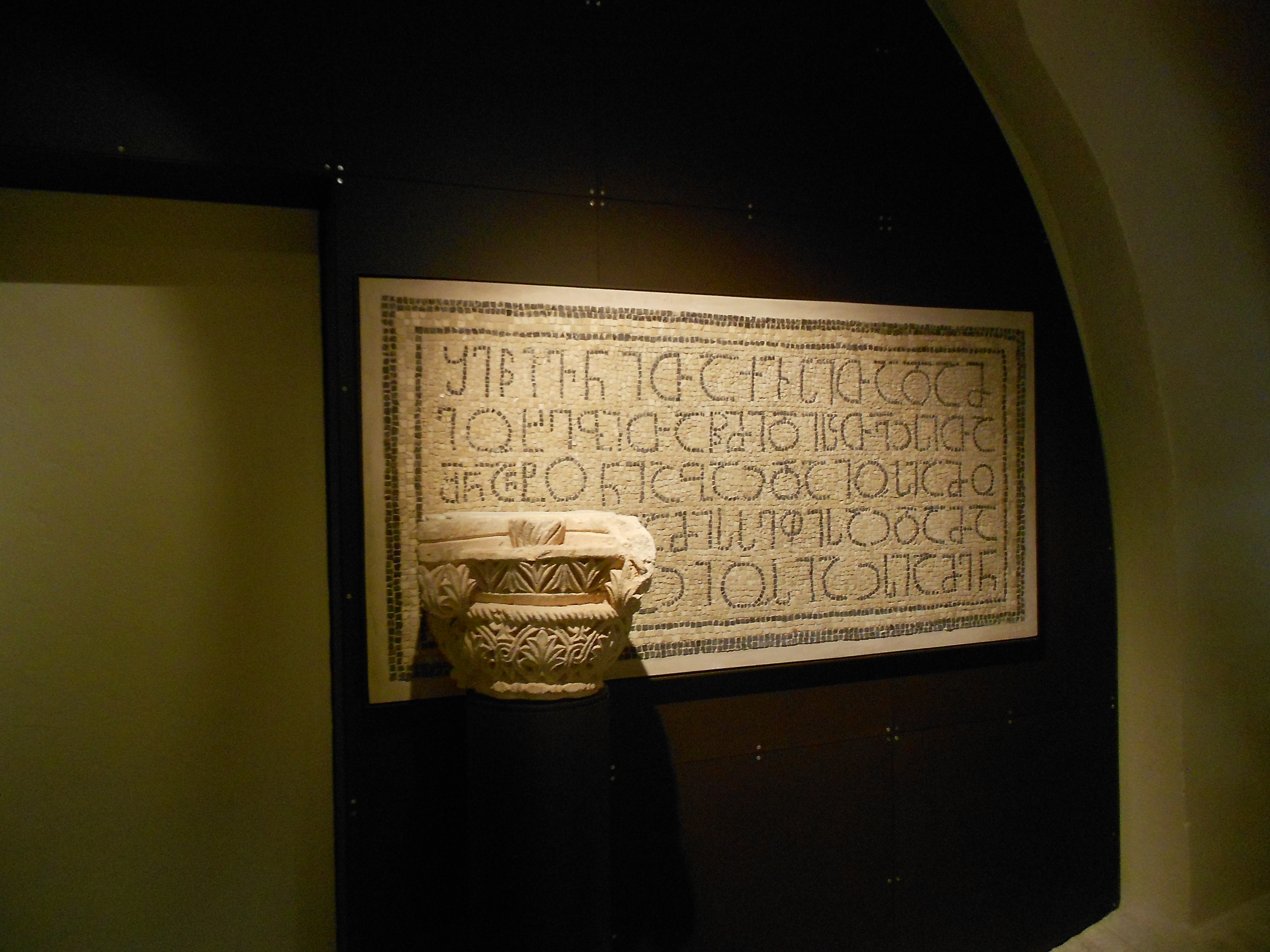
Inscription 3

shetsʼevnitakeysitadam
eokhebitatsʼmidisadateysita
shnantʼoniabaydaiosiamo
mskhmeliamissepisaydama
madedayiosiaysiamen

Translation: With the help of Jesus Christ and Saint Theodore, God have mercy on Abba Antony and Iosia the layer of this mosaic and the father and mother of Iosia, Amen.

This five-line mosaic inscription (size: 82 cm × 212 cm (32 in × 83 in)) was set in a tabula ansata, placed on the floor of the refectory hall of the monastery. Asomtavruli letters and the frame are made of black tessera on the white background and the mosaic's state of preservation is excellent. Iosia (i.e. Josiah) in the inscription is referenced as "master of mosaics". The name “Josiah” is unknown for Georgian nomenclature of that time. It is the Jewish personal name, represented with the Greek form, a name is not known by other sources. It seems that he was a Christian and is mentioned in the inscription together with his parents. Some scholars consider Josiah to be the person who provided the funds for mosaic in the church. Abba Anthony is identified by scholars with the Jerusalemite Georgian monk and priest Amba Anthony (fl. 596) who had been mentioned in several Georgian sources, who was connected with Simeon Stylites the Younger. Per sources he brought to Simeon the relics of the True Cross, later stayed in Syria, where he became a bishop.

=== Inscription 4 ===
[...]
Ⴆ[...]
Ⴈ[...]
CO[...]
MCO[...]
Translation: [...]z[...]i[...]CO[...]MCO[...]

The fourth mosaic inscription is too fragmentary to propose a reading. It was found at the eastern portico of the courtyard.

== See also ==
- Greco-Georgian mosaic of Mount Zion
- Bolnisi inscriptions
- Umm Leisun inscription

== Notes ==
1. In Georgian scholarship is known as the Georgian inscriptions of Palestine (Georgian: პალესტინის ქართული წარწერები, romanized: p'alest'inis kartuli ts'arts'erebi).
2. In Arabic Bir el Qutt (Arabic: بئر القطعة) means "the well of the crag".

== Bibliography ==
- Corbo, V. C. (1955) Gli scavi di Kh. Siyar el-Ghanam (Campo dei pastori) e i monasteri dei dintorni, Tip. dei PP. Francescani
- Tchekhanovets, Y. (2018) The Caucasian Archaeology of the Holy Land: Armenian, Georgian and Albanian communities between the fourth and eleventh centuries CE, Brill Publishers, ISBN 978-90-04-36224-6
- Khurtsilava, B. (2017) The inscriptions of the Georgian Monastery in Bi’r el-Qutt and their chronology, Christianity in the Middle East, No 1, Moscow, pp. 129–151
- Khurtsilava, B. (2018) Traces of the Georgians on the Holy Land, Tbilisi, ISBN 978-9941-8-0042-9
- Palmer, E.H. (1881). The Survey of Western Palestine: Arabic and English Name Lists Collected During the Survey by Lieutenants Conder and Kitchener, R. E. Transliterated and Explained by E.H. Palmer. Committee of the Palestine Exploration Fund.
- Rayfield, D. (2013) Edge of Empires: A History of Georgia, Reaktion Books, ISBN 9781780230702
- De Gruyter (2018) Iudaea / Idumaea: 2649–3324, Part 1, LXXIV, ISBN 9783110544213
- Horn, C. B. (2006) Asceticism and Christological Controversy in Fifth-Century Palestine, The Career of Peter the Iberian, Oxford University Press, ISBN 9780199277537
