= Yana Tchekhanovets =

Israeli archaeologist

Yana Tchekhanovets (Russian: Яна Чехановец, Hebrew: יאנה צ'חנוביץ) is an archaeologist, researcher at the Israel Antiquities Authority, and lecturer in Classical Archaeology at the Ben-Gurion University. She specializes in the archaeology of the Byzantine era, pilgrimage, and the Caucasian, primarily ancient Armenian and Georgian presence in the Holy Land; an author of scholarly monographs and articles.

Born in 1970, and raised in Saint Petersburg, Soviet Union. From 2002 to 2016, she studied archaeology at the Hebrew University of Jerusalem. She specializes in the material culture of the late antiquity, the archaeology of pilgrimage and monasticism, and the archaeology of historical periods. Yana, alongside Doron Ben-Ami, was leading Givati Parking Lot dig.
