= Old Georgian =

5th–11th-century literary language of Georgian monarchies

- enay kartuli
- ႤႬႠჂ ႵႠႰႧႭჃႪႨ
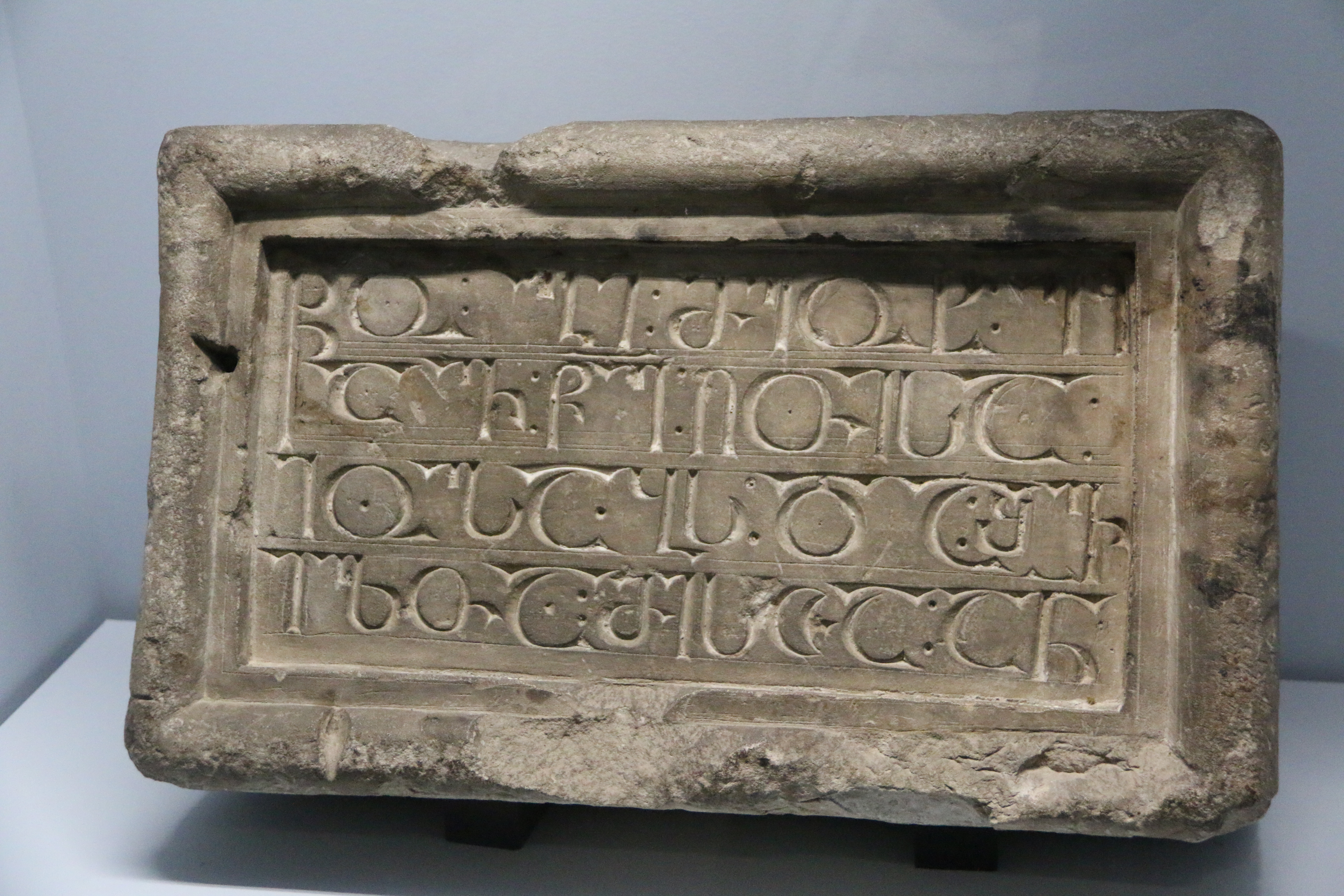
- Old Georgian in Asomtavruli script
- Native to: Colchis, Kingdom of Iberia, Sasanian Iberia, Principality of Iberia, Lazica, Kingdom of the Iberians, Kingdom of the Abkhazians, Theme of Iberia, Emirate of Tbilisi, Kingdom of Hereti, Principality of Kakheti, First Kingdom of Kakheti, Kingdom of Georgia
- Region: Caucasus and Eastern Anatolia
- Ethnicity: Georgians
- Era: 5th to 11th centuries; liturgical in the Georgian Orthodox Church
- Language family: Kartvelian: Old Georgian
- Writing system: Georgian script

Language codes
- ISO 639-3: oge
- Glottolog: oldg1234

Old Georgian (ႤႬႠჂ ႵႠႰႧႭჃႪႨ, (Note: Spelled ႤႬႠჂ ႵႠႰႧႳႪႨ after the new letter Ⴓ ⟨u⟩ replaced ႭჃ ⟨oü⟩.) enay kartuli) is a literary language of the Georgian monarchies attested from the 5th century. The language remains in use as the liturgical language of the Georgian Orthodox Church and for the most part is still intelligible. Spoken Old Georgian gave way to what is classified as Middle Georgian in the 11th century, which in turn developed into the Modern Georgian in the 18th century.

== Periodization ==
Two periods are distinguished within Old Georgian: Early Old Georgian (5th to 8th centuries) and Classical Old Georgian (9th to 11th centuries). Two different dialects are represented in Early Old Georgian, known as Khanmet’i (Georgian: ხანმეტი, 5th to 7th c.) and Haemet’i (ჰაემეტი, 7th and 8th c.). They are so named after the presence of a second-person subject prefix and a third-person object prefix kh- or h- in the verbal morphology where Classical Old Georgian has h-, s- or zero.

== Texts ==
The corpus of Early Old Georgian texts is limited in size, consisting of a dozen inscriptions and eight manuscripts containing religious texts. The literature in Classical Old Georgian has a wider scope, including philosophical and historiographical works.

== Phoneme inventory ==
Old Georgian had 29 phonemic consonants and 5 phonemic vowels. The native spelling also distinguishes the semivowel y, which is an allophone of the vowel i in postvocalic position.

The table shows the consonants in the National Transliteration System (2002). This system leaves aspiration unmarked, and marks glottalization with an apostrophe. International Phonetic Alphabet equivalents are included in square brackets when different.

Old Georgian consonants
| | | Labial | Dental/ Alveolar | | Alveo- palatal | Velar | Uvular | Glottal |
| | | Labial | plain | sib. | Alveo- palatal | Velar | Uvular | Glottal |
|---|---|---|---|---|---|---|---|---|
| Plosive/ Affricate | aspirated | p [pʰ] | t [tʰ] | ts [tsʰ] | ch [tʃʰ] | k [kʰ] | q [qʰ] | |
| Plosive/ Affricate | glottalized | p’ [pˀ] | t’ [tˀ] | ts’ [tsˀ] | ch’ [tʃˀ] | k’ [kˀ] | q’ [qˀ] | |
| Plosive/ Affricate | voiced | b | d | dz | j [dʒ] | g [ɡ] | | |
| Fricative | voiceless | | | s | sh [ʃ] | | kh [χ] | h |
| Fricative | voiced | | | z | zh [ʒ] | | gh [ʁ] | |
| Nasal | | m | n | | | | | |
| Trill | | | r | | | | | |
| Lateral | | | l | | | | | |
| Semivowel | | w | | | y [j] | | | |

Old Georgian vowels
| | Front | Central | Back |
|---|---|---|---|
| High | i | | u |
| Mid | e | | o |
| Low | | a | |

According to Schanidse, word stress in Old Georgian fell on the antepenultimate (third-to-last) syllable of a word, exceptionally, stress fell on the penultimate (second-to-last) syllable of a word if the word contained the question particle -Ⴀ (-a), e.g. ႫႭႥႨႣႠ (móvida, "s/he/it came") but ႫႭႥႨႣႠႠ (movidáa? "Did s/he/it come?").

== Morphosyntax ==
Old Georgian verbs are polysynthetic with noun incorporation as an active morphosyntactic process; the incorporated object always precedes the head.

adgil-i-p’q’r=a mun, sada i-q’=o, or dğe
place-PRV-destroy=3SG.SUBJ.AOR there where PRV-be=3SG.SUBJ.AOR two days
'he laid waste there where he was for two days'

vin aka s̆ina tawq'an-is-x-c=es ğ[mertma]n s̆e-i-c'q'al-e-n
Who.NOM here inside worship-GEN-3SG.OBJ-give=3PL.SUBJ God-ERG PVB-PRV-bless-SCV-NOM.PL
'May God bless whoever worships inside here [this church]'

== Script ==
Old Georgian was written in its own alphabetic script, known as Asomtavruli "capital letters" or Mrglovani "rounded". The alphabet is very nearly phonemic, showing an excellent "fit" between phonemes and graphemes. It is clearly modelled on the Greek alphabet, showing basically the same alphabetic order, and with letters representing non-Greek phonemes gathered at the end. Apart from letters for nearly all Georgian phonemes, the alphabet also contains three letters representing Greek phonemes not found in Georgian (ē, ü and ō). Most individual letters seem to be entirely independent designs, with only a few based directly on their Greek counterparts (cf. Greek Φ Θ Χ [pʰ tʰ kʰ], Asomtavruli Ⴔ Ⴇ Ⴕ).

Old Georgian Asomtavruli alphabet
| Greek | Α | Β | Γ | Δ | Ε | Ϝ | Ζ | Η | Θ | Ι | Κ | Λ | Μ | Ν | (Ξ) | Ο | Π | (Ϙ) | Ρ |
| Asomtavruli | Ⴀ | Ⴁ | Ⴂ | Ⴃ | Ⴄ | Ⴅ | Ⴆ | Ⴡ | Ⴇ | Ⴈ | Ⴉ | Ⴊ | Ⴋ | Ⴌ | Ⴢ | Ⴍ | Ⴎ | Ⴏ | Ⴐ |
| Transliteration | a | b | g | d | e | v | z | ē | t | i | k’ | l | m | n | y | o | p’ | zh | r |
| Greek | Σ | Τ | Υ | Φ | Χ | (Ψ) | – | – | – | – | – | – | – | – | – | – | – | Ω | |
| Asomtavruli | Ⴑ | Ⴒ | Ⴣ | Ⴔ | Ⴕ | Ⴖ | Ⴗ | Ⴘ | Ⴙ | Ⴚ | Ⴛ | Ⴜ | Ⴝ | Ⴞ | Ⴤ | Ⴟ | Ⴠ | Ⴥ | |
| Transliteration | s | t’ | ü | p | k | gh | q’ | sh | ch | ts | dz | ts’ | ch’ | kh | q | j | h | ō | |

== Orthography ==
Old Georgian orthography is quite consistent, in the sense that the same word is usually written in the same way in all instances. Spelling is nearly phonemic, with almost all phonemes exclusively represented by a single letter. The exceptions are described below.

Vowel u

The most conspicuous exception to the rule that each phoneme is written with its own letter is the vowel u, which is consistently written with the digraph ႭჃ ⟨oü⟩, for example ႮႭჃႰႨ ⟨p’oüri⟩ p’uri "bread". This usage was evidently adopted from Greek spelling, which writes /u/ as ⟨ου⟩. In the later Nuskhuri script, the original digraph ⴍⴣ ⟨oü⟩ merged into a single letter ⴓ ⟨u⟩ (modern Mkhedruli script უ). A matching Asomtavruli single-letter counterpart Ⴓ was then devised; this letter was not part of the original alphabet, and was not used in the Old Georgian period.

Semivowel w

The semivowel w is written in two ways, depending on its position within the word. When it occurs directly after a consonant, it is written with the digraph ႭჃ ⟨oü⟩, for example ႹႭჃႤႬ ⟨choüen⟩ chwen "we", ႢႭჃႰႨႲႨ ⟨goürit’i⟩ gwrit’i "turtledove". The digraph ႭჃ ⟨oü⟩ thus represents both w and u, without differentiation in the spelling, for example ႵႭჃႧႨ ⟨khoüti⟩ khuti "five" vs. ႤႵႭჃႱႨ ⟨ekoüsi⟩ ekwsi "six".

In all other positions, w is written with the letter Ⴅ ⟨v⟩, for example ႧႭႥႪႨ ⟨tovli⟩ towli "snow", ႥႤႪႨ ⟨veli⟩ weli "field", ႩႠႰႠႥႨ ⟨k’aravi⟩ k’arawi "tent".

The two spellings of w clearly represent an allophonic variation like the one described for modern Georgian, between [w] in postconsonantal position and [ʋ] or [β] in other positions. In modern Georgian spelling (as standardized in 1879), both [w] and [ʋ/β] are consistently written with ვ ⟨v⟩, and spellings with Ⴅ ⟨v⟩ instead of the expected ႭჃ ⟨oü⟩ are already found in Old Georgian.

Semivowel y

The initial vowel i- of a case suffix is realized as y- after a vowel, and this allophonic y has its own letter in the alphabet, for example:

ႣႤႣႠჂ ႨႤႱႭჃჂႱႠ
⟨deday iesoüysa⟩
deda-y iesu-ysa
mother-NOM Jesus-GEN
"the mother of Jesus"

The "Greek" letters

The Asomtavruli alphabet contains three letters which are not needed for the writing of native words: Ⴡ ⟨ē⟩, Ⴣ ⟨ü⟩ and Ⴥ ⟨ō⟩. These were added to the alphabet in order to make possible a letter-for-letter transliteration of Greek names and loanwords. They were indeed occasionally used to write the Greek vowels ē (ēta), ü (ypsilon) and ō (ōmega). As these vowels are alien to Georgian, they were replaced in actual pronunciation by ey, wi and ow respectively, as can be deduced from old variant spellings, and from corresponding modern forms. For example, Greek Αἴγυπτος is written ႤႢჃႮႲႤ ⟨egüp’t’e⟩ egwip’t’e "Egypt" (cf. modern Georgian ეგვიპტე egvip’t’e).

In native words, the letter Ⴥ ⟨ō⟩ was mainly used to write the vocative particle, for example:

Ⴥ ႣႤႣႨႩႠႺႭ
⟨ō dedik’atso⟩
o dedik’atso
"o woman!"

The letters Ⴡ ⟨ē⟩ and Ⴣ ⟨ü⟩ on the other hand were frequently used in the spelling of native words, as a short-hand way of representing the sequences ey and wi, for example ႫႤႴჁ ⟨mepē⟩ mepey "king", ႶჃႬႭჂ ⟨ghünoy⟩ ghwinoy "wine". Spelling can thus vary within a paradigm, for example ႱႨႲႷႭჃႠჂ ⟨sit’q’oüay⟩ sit’q’wa-y "word" (nominative case) vs. ႱႨႲႷჃႱႠ ⟨sit’q’üsa⟩ sit’q’w-isa (genitive). The sequences ey and wi could also be written out in full however, for example ႫႤႴႤჂ ⟨mepey⟩ mepey, ႶႭჃႨႬႭჂ ⟨ghoüinoy⟩ ghwinoy "wine" (also ႶჃႨႬႭჂ ⟨ghüinoy⟩, a mixed spelling).

== Bibliography ==
- Aronson, Howard J. (1997). "Georgian phonology". In Alan S. Kaye (ed.). Phonologies of Asia and Africa. Vol. 2, Winona Lake, Indiana: Eisenbrauns. ISBN 1-57506-018-3.
- Fähnrich, Heinz (2007). Kartwelisches etymologisches Wörterbuch. Leiden: Brill. ISBN 978-9004161092.
- Fähnrich, Heinz (2012). Die georgische Sprache. Leiden: Brill. ISBN 978-9004219069.
- Schanidse, Akaki (1982). Grammatik der altgeorgischen Sprache. Schriften des Lehrstuhls für altgeorgische Sprache, vol. 24. Transl. Heinz Fähnrich. Tbilissi: Staatsuniversität.
- Tuite, Kevin (2008). "Early Georgian". In Roger D. Wood (ed.). Ancient Languages of Asia Minor. Cambridge: CUP (pp. 145–165). ISBN 978-0521684965.
