= Languages of the Caucasus =

Diverse languages between the Black and Caspian seas

Ethnolinguistic groups in the Caucasus region (1995)

The Caucasian languages comprise a large and extremely varied array of languages spoken by more than ten million people in and around the Caucasus Mountains, which lie between the Black Sea and the Caspian Sea.

Linguistic comparison allows the classification of these languages into several language families, with little or no discernible affinity to each other. However, the languages of the Caucasus are sometimes mistakenly referred to as part of a single language family. According to Asya Pereltsvaig, "grammatical differences between the three groups of languages are considerable. [...] These differences force the more conservative historical linguistics to treat the three language families of the Caucasus as unrelated."

== Families indigenous to the Caucasus ==
Caucasian
- (geographic)
- Geographic distribution: Caucasus
- Linguistic classification: Not a single family
- Subdivisions: Kartvelian; Northeast Caucasian/Alarodian?; Northwest Caucasian

Language codes
- Glottolog: None

Three of these families have no current indigenous members outside the Caucasus, and are considered indigenous to the area. The term Caucasian languages is generally restricted to these families, which are spoken by about 11.2 million people.

- Kartvelian, also known as the South Caucasian or Iberian language family, with a total of about 4.3 million speakers. Includes Georgian, the official language of Georgia, with four million speakers, Svan with 14,000 speakers, Mingrelian with 345,000 speakers, and Laz with 22,000 speakers.
- Northeast Caucasian, also called the Nakh-Daghestani, North Caspian or Caspian family, with a total of about 4.3 million speakers. Includes Chechen with 1.7 million speakers, Avar with 1 million speakers, Dargwa with 590,000 speakers, Ingush with 500,000 speakers, and Lezgian with 800,000 speakers.
- Northwest Caucasian, also called the Circassic, Abkhazo–Circassian, Abkhazo-Adyghe, North Caspian or Pontic family, with a total of about 2 million speakers. Includes Kabardian, with one million speakers, Adyghe with 610,000 speakers, Abkhaz with 190,000 speakers, and Abaza with 85,000 speakers.

The Northeast and Northwest Caucasian families are notable for their high number of consonant phonemes (inventories range up to the 80–84 consonants of Ubykh). The consonant inventories of the South Caucasian languages, however, are not nearly as extensive, ranging from 28 (Georgian) to 32 (Svan) – comparable to languages like Russian (up to 37 consonant phonemes, depending on definition), Arabic (28 phonemes), and Western European languages (often more than 20 phonemes).

The autochthonous languages of the Caucasus share some areal features, such as the presence of ejective consonants and a highly agglutinative structure, and, with the sole exception of Mingrelian, all of them exhibit a greater or lesser degree of ergativity. Many of these features are shared with other languages that have been in the Caucasus for a long time, such as Ossetian (which has ejective sounds but no ergativity).

=== External relations ===
Since the birth of comparative linguistics in the 19th century, the riddle of the apparently isolated Caucasian language families has attracted the attention of many scholars, who have endeavored to relate them to each other or to languages outside the Caucasus region. The most promising proposals are connections between the Northeast and Northwest Caucasian families with each other or with languages formerly spoken in Anatolia and northern Mesopotamia.

==== North Caucasian languages ====
Linguists such as Sergei Starostin see the Northeast (Nakh-Dagestanian) and Northwest (Abkhaz–Adyghe) families as related and propose uniting them in a single North Caucasian family, sometimes called Caucasic or simply Caucasian. This theory excludes the South Caucasian languages, thereby proposing two indigenous language families. While these two families share many similarities, their morphological structure, with many morphemes consisting of a single consonant, make comparison between them unusually difficult, and it has not been possible to establish a genetic relationship with any certainty.

==== Ibero-Caucasian languages ====
There are no known affinities between the South Caucasian and North Caucasian families. Nevertheless, some scholars have proposed the single name Ibero-Caucasian for all the Caucasian language families, North and South, in an attempt to unify the Caucasian languages under one family.

==== Hattic ====
Some linguists have claimed affinities between the Northwest Caucasian (Circassian) family and the extinct Hattic language of central Anatolia.

==== Alarodian ====
Alarodian is a proposed connection between Northeast Caucasian and the extinct Hurro-Urartian languages of Anatolia.

==== Dené–Caucasian macrofamily ====
Linguists such as Sergei Starostin have proposed a Dené–Caucasian macrofamily, which includes the North Caucasian languages together with Basque, Burushaski, Na-Dené, Sino-Tibetan, and Yeniseian. This proposal is rejected by most linguists.

== Families with wider distribution ==
Other languages historically and currently spoken in the Caucasus area can be placed into families with a much wider geographical distribution.

=== Indo-European ===
The predominant Indo-European language in the Caucasus is Armenian, spoken by the Armenians (circa 6.7 million speakers). The Ossetians, speaking the Ossetian language, form another group of around 700,000 speakers. Other Indo-European languages spoken in the Caucasus include Greek (Pontic Greek), Persian (including Tat Persian), Kurdish, Talysh, Judeo-Tat, and the Slavic languages, such as Russian and Ukrainian, whose speakers number over a third of the total population of the Caucasus.

=== Semitic ===
Two dialects of Neo-Aramaic are spoken in the Caucasus: Assyrian Neo-Aramaic, with around 30,000 speakers, and Bohtan Neo-Aramaic, with around 1,000 speakers. Both of these were brought to the Caucasus by ethnic Assyrians fleeing the Sayfo or Assyrian genocide during World War I.

A dialect of Arabic known as Shirvani Arabic was spoken natively in parts of Azerbaijan and Dagestan throughout medieval times until the early 20th century. In the nineteenth century, it was considered that the best literary Arabic was spoken in the mountains of Dagestan.

=== Turkic ===
Several Turkic languages are spoken in the Caucasus. Of these, Azerbaijani is predominant, with around 9 million speakers in Azerbaijan and more than 10 million in North Western Iran. Other Turkic languages spoken include Karachay-Balkar, Kumyk, Nogai, Turkish, Turkmen and Urum.

=== Mongolic ===
Kalmyk Oirat, spoken by descendants of Oirat-speakers from East Asia, is a Mongolic language.

== Vocabulary comparison ==
Below are selected basic vocabulary items for all three language families of the Caucasus.

| gloss | Proto-NE Caucasian | Proto-NW Caucasian | Proto-Kartvelian |
|---|---|---|---|
| eye | *(b)ul, *(b)al | *b-la | *twal- |
| tooth | *cVl- | *ca | GZ *ḳb-il- |
| tongue | *maʒ-i | *bza | *nena- |
| hand, arm | *kV, *kol- | *q’a | *qe- |
| back (of body) | *-uqq’ | *pxá | |
| heart | *rVk’u / *Vrk’u | *g°ə | *gul- |
| meat | *(CV)-(lV)ƛƛ’ | *Lə | GZ *qorc- |
| sun | *bVrVg | *dəɣa | *mz₁e- |
| moon | *baʒVr / *buʒVr | *məʒa | *tute- |
| earth | *(l)ončči | *č’ə-g°ə (P-Circassian) | |
| water | *ɬɬin | *psə (P-Circassian) | GZ *c̣q̣a- |
| fire | *c’ar(i), *c’ad(i) | *məć’°a | GZ *ʓec₁xl- |
| ashes | *rV-uqq’ / *rV-uƛƛ’ | *tq°a | *ṭuṭa- |
| road | *-eqq’ / *-aqq’ | *məʕ°á | GZ *gza- |
| name | *cc’Vr, *cc’Vri | *(p’)c’a | *ʓ₁ax-e- |
| kill | *-Vƛ’ | *ƛ’ə́ | |
| burn | *-Vk’ | *ca; *bla/ə | *c₁x- |
| know | *(-)Vc’ | *ć’a | *kab-, GZ *uc̣q̇- |
| black | *alč’i- (*ʕalč’i-) | *ć’°a | |
| round | *goRg / *gog-R- | | *grgw- |
| dry | *-aqq’(u) / *-uqq’ | *ʕ°ə́ | *šwer-, *šwr- |
| thin | *(C)-uƛ’Vl- | *č’°a | GZ *ttx-el- |
| what | *sti- | *sə-tʰə; *śə-da (P-Circassian) | *ma- |
| one | *cV (*cʕV ?) | *za | GZ *ert- |
| five | *(W)-ƛƛi / *ƛƛwi | *txᵒə | *xut- |

== See also ==
- Caucasus
- Ethnic groups in the Caucasus
- Languages of Europe
- North Caucasus
- South Caucasus
