= Ərəblər =

Ərəblər or Arablyar or Arablar may refer to:

- Ərəblər, Barda, Azerbaijan
- Ərəblər, Davachi, Azerbaijan
