= Languages of Turkey =

- Official: Turkish
- Recognised: Armenian, Bulgarian, Greek, Hebrew
- Minority: Kurdish (Kurmanji), Zazaki, Azerbaijani, Arabic, Neo-Aramaic and Classical Syriac, Pomak Bulgarian, Balkan Gagauz Turkish, Laz, Georgian, Megleno-Romanian, Pontic Greek, Judaeo-Spanish
- Immigrant: Adyghe, Albanian, Arabic, Bosnian, Crimean Tatar, Kabardian (in alphabetical order)
- Foreign: English (17%); German (4%); Arabic (2%); French (1%)
- Signed: Turkish Sign Language; Mardin Sign Language
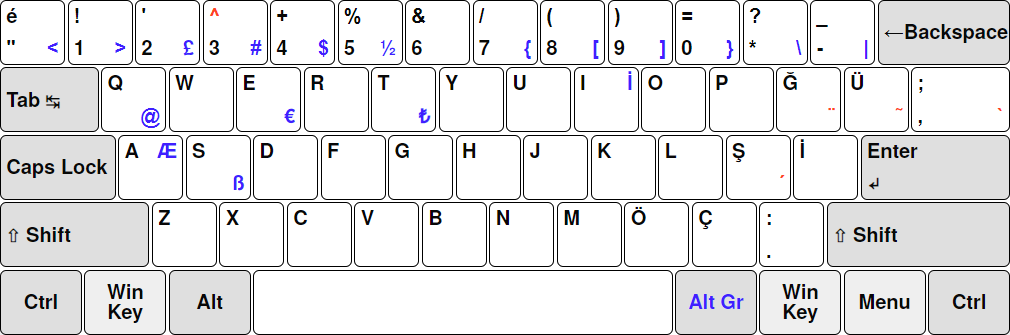
- Keyboard layout: Turkish (F-keyboard); Turkish (Q-keyboard)

The languages of Turkey, apart from the official language Turkish, include the widespread Kurdish, and a number of less common minority languages. Four minority languages are officially recognized in the Republic of Turkey by the 1923 Treaty of Lausanne and the Turkey-Bulgaria Friendship Treaty (Türkiye ve Bulgaristan Arasındaki Dostluk Antlaşması) of 18 October 1925: Armenian, Bulgarian, Greek, and Hebrew. In 2013, the Ankara 13th Circuit Administrative Court ruled that the minority provisions of the Lausanne Treaty should also apply to Assyrians in Turkey and the Syriac language.

== History ==
Turkey has historically been the home to many now extinct languages. These include Hittite, the earliest Indo-European language for which written evidence exists (circa 1600 BCE to 1100 BCE when the Hittite Empire existed). The other Anatolian languages included Luwian and later Lycian, Lydian and Milyan. All these languages are believed to have become extinct at the latest around the 1st century BCE due to the Hellenization of Anatolia which led to Greek in a variety of dialects becoming the common language.

Urartian belonging to the Hurro-Urartian language family existed in eastern Anatolia around Lake Van. It existed as the language of the kingdom of Urartu from about the 9th century BCE until the 6th century. Hattian is attested in Hittite ritual texts but is not related to the Hittite language or to any other known language; it dates from the 2nd millennium BCE.

In the post-Tanzimat period French became a common language among educated people, even though no ethnic group in the empire natively spoke French. Johann Strauss, author of "Language and power in the late Ottoman Empire," wrote that "In a way reminiscent of English in the contemporary world, French was almost omnipresent in the Ottoman lands." Strauss also stated that French was "a sort of semi-official language", which "to some extent" had "replaced Turkish as an 'official' language for non-Muslims". Therefore late empire had multiple French-language publications, and several continued to operate when the Republic of Turkey was declared in 1923. However French-language publications began to close in the 1930s. As the Treaty of Lausanne went into effect and was intended to protect languages of instruction for ethnic minorities, French was not included, and so schools for Jewish children teaching in French converted into being Turkish medium schools. The quantity and quality of French instruction declined in those schools for Jewish children, and so many Jewish students began attending other language-medium private schools.

When French-medium schools operated by Alliance Israélite Universelle opened in the 1860s, the position of Judaeo-Spanish (Ladino) began to weaken in the Ottoman Empire areas. In time Judaeo-Spanish became perceived as a low status language. Hebrew was the instructional language of Judaism, and so the Treaty of Lausanne protected instruction in Hebrew, but not in Judaeo-Spanish, a language passed along in families but never used in school instruction. Judaeo-Spanish was still the native language of 85% of Turkish Jews in 1927; there was still relatively low fluency in Turkish in that population, which meant they encountered issues with the Citizen, speak Turkish! campaign. However, as time progressed, Judaeo-Spanish language and culture declined, and in 2017 writer Melis Alphan described Judaeo-Spanish as "dying in Turkey".

== Constitutional rights ==
=== Official language ===
Article 3 of the Constitution of Turkey defines Turkish as the official language of Turkey.

=== Minority language rights ===
Article 42 of the Constitution explicitly prohibits educational institutions to teach any language other than Turkish as a mother tongue to Turkish citizens.

No language other than Turkish shall be taught as a mother tongue to Turkish citizens at any institutions of training or education. Foreign languages to be taught in institutions of training and education and the rules to be followed by schools conducting training and education in a foreign language shall be determined by law. The provisions of international treaties are reserved.

— Art. 42, Constitution of the Republic of Turkey

Due to Article 42 and its longtime restrictive interpretation, ethnic minorities have been facing severe restrictions in the use of their mother languages.

Concerning the incompatibility of this provision with the International Bill of Human Rights, Turkey signed the International Covenants on Civil and Political Rights and on Economic, Social and Cultural Rights only with reservations constraining minority rights and the right to education. Furthermore, Turkey has not signed either of the Council of Europe's Framework Convention for the Protection of National Minorities, the European Charter for Regional or Minority Languages, or the anti-discrimination Protocol 12 to the European Convention on Human Rights.

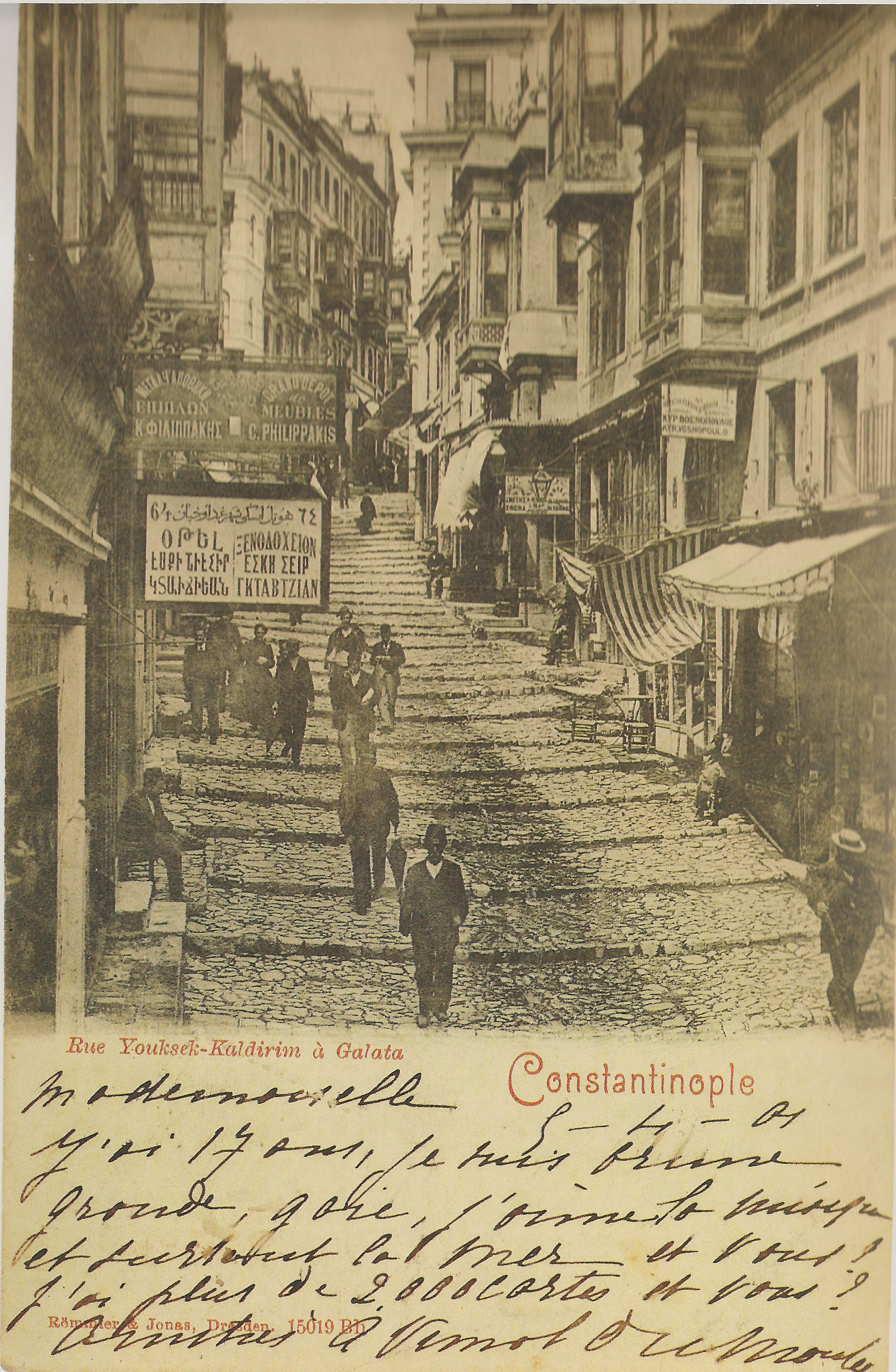
A 1901 postcard depicting Galata in Constantinople (Istanbul), showing signage in Ottoman Turkish, French, Greek, and Armenian

This particular constitutional provision has been contested both internationally and within Turkey. The provision has been criticized by minority groups, notably the Kurdish community. In October 2004, the Turkish State's Human Rights Advisory Board called for a constitutional review in order to bring Turkey's policy on minorities in line with international standards, but was effectively muted. It was also criticized by EU member states, the OSCE, and international human rights organizations, including Human Rights Watch who observe that "the Turkish government accepts the language rights of the Jewish, Greek and Armenian minorities as being guaranteed by the 1923 Treaty of Lausanne. But the government claims that these are Turkey's only minorities, and that any talk of minority rights beyond this is just separatism". Bulgarian-speakers are also officially recognized by the Turkey-Bulgaria Friendship Treaty (Türkiye ve Bulgaristan Arasındaki Dostluk Antlaşması) of 18 October 1925.

=== Supplementary language education ===
In 2012, the Ministry of Education included Kurdish (based on both Kurmanji and Zazaki dialects) to the academic programme of the basic schools as optional classes from the fifth year on.

Later, the Ministry of Education also included Abkhaz, Adyghe, Standard Georgian, and Laz languages in 2013, and Albanian as well as Bosnian languages in February 2017.

In 2015, the Turkey’s Ministry of Education announced that as of the 2016–17 academic year, Arabic courses (as a second language) will be offered to students in elementary school starting in second grade. The Arabic courses will be offered as an elective language course like German, French and English. According to a prepared curriculum, second and third graders will start learning Arabic by listening-comprehension and speaking, while introduction to writing will join these skills in fourth grade and after fifth grade students will start learning the language in all its four basic skills.

== Statistics ==
The last publicly published census for languages was 1965 census.

Language	Census 1927		Census 1935		Census 1945		Census 1950		Census 1955		Census 1960		Census 1965	
Language	Number	%	Number	%	Number	%	Number	%	Number	%	Number	%	Number	%
Turkish	11,778,810	86.42	13,899,073	86.02	16,598,037	88.34	18,254,851	87.15	21,622,292	89.85	25,172,535	90.70	28,175,579	89.76
Kurdish	1,184,446	8.69	1,480,246	9.16	1,476,562	7.9	1,680,043	8.02	1,679,265	6.98	1,847,674	6.66	2,219,599	7.07
Zazaki	1,184,446	8.69	1,480,246	9.16	1,476,562	7.9	174,526	0.70	1,679,265	6.98	1,847,674	6.66	150,644	0.48
Arabic	134,273	0.98	153,687	0.95	247,294	1.3	269,038	1.28	300,583	1.25	347,690	1.25	365,340	1.16
Circassian	95,901	0.70	91,972	0.57	66,691	0.4	75,837	0.36	77,611	0.32	63,137	0.23	58,339	0.19
Greek	119,822	0.88	108,725	0.67	88,680	0.47	89,472	0.43	79,691	0.33	65,139	0.23	48,096	0.15
Armenian	64,745	0.48	57,599	0.36	47,728	0.3	52,776	0.25	56,235	0.23	52,756	0.19	33,094	0.11
Georgian	-	-	57,325	0.35	40,076	0.21	72,604	0.35	51,983	0.22	32,944	0.12	34,330	0.11
Laz	-	-	63,253	0.39	39,323	0.21	70,423	0.34	30,566	0.13	21,703	0.08	26,007	0.08
other	251,491	1.85	227,544	1.41	185,783	0.99	207,618	0.99	166,537	0.69	151,242	0.54	280,403	0.89
Total	13,629.488	100	16,157,450	100	18,790,174	100	20,947,188	100	24,064,763	100	27,754,820	100	31,391,421	100

=== 1927 Census ===
Main article: 1927 Turkish Census

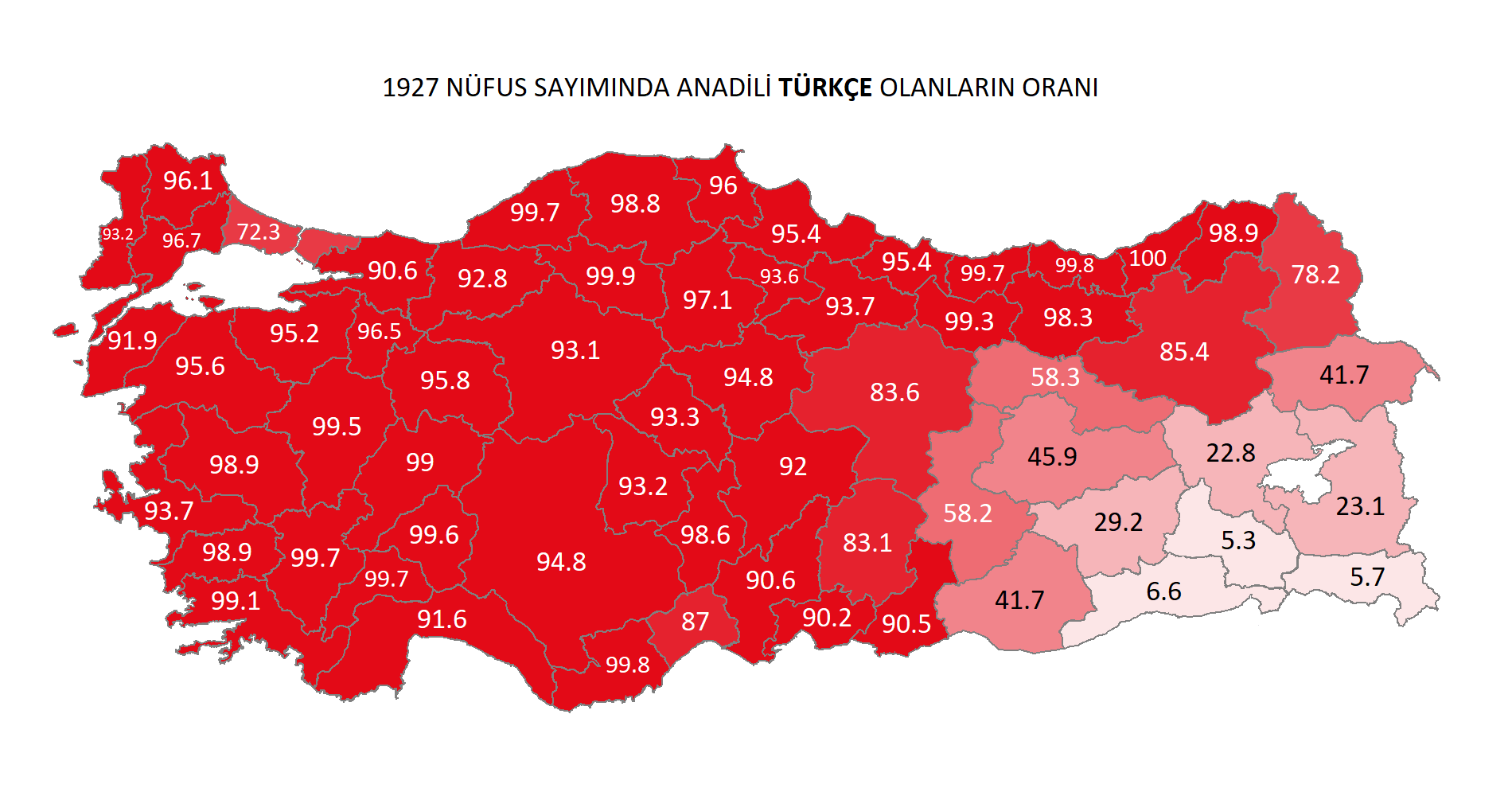
Turkish

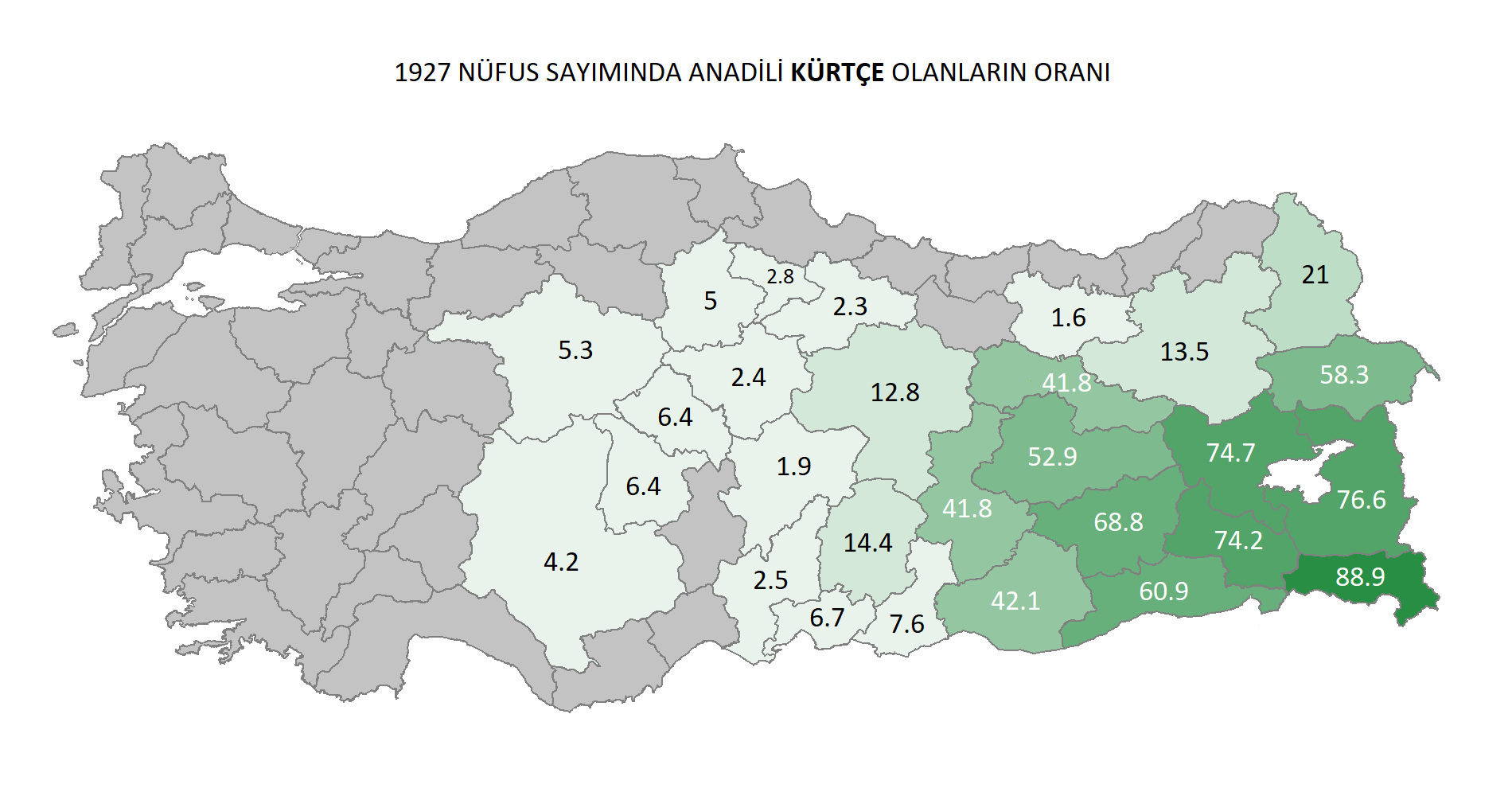
Kurdish

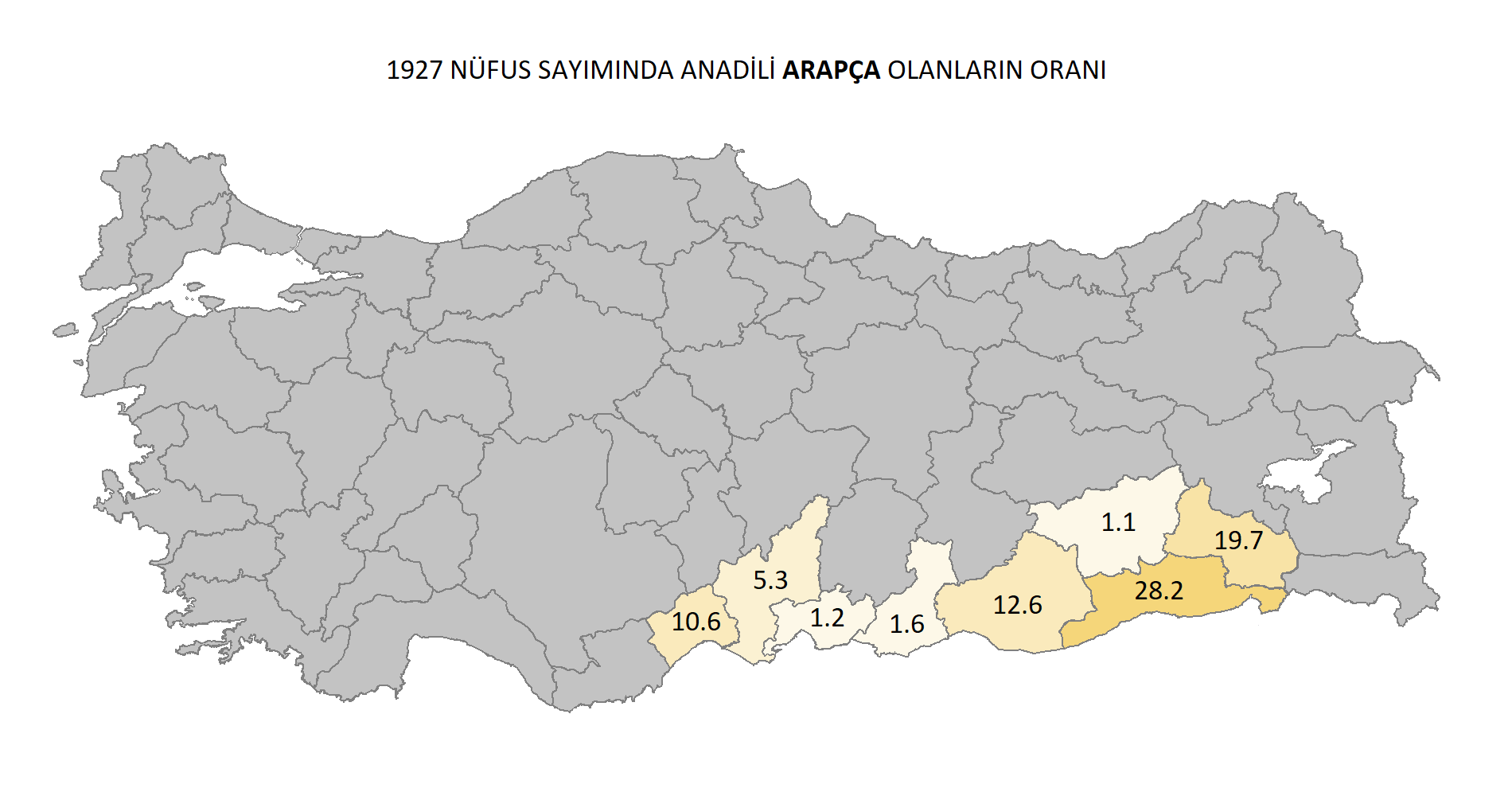
Arabic

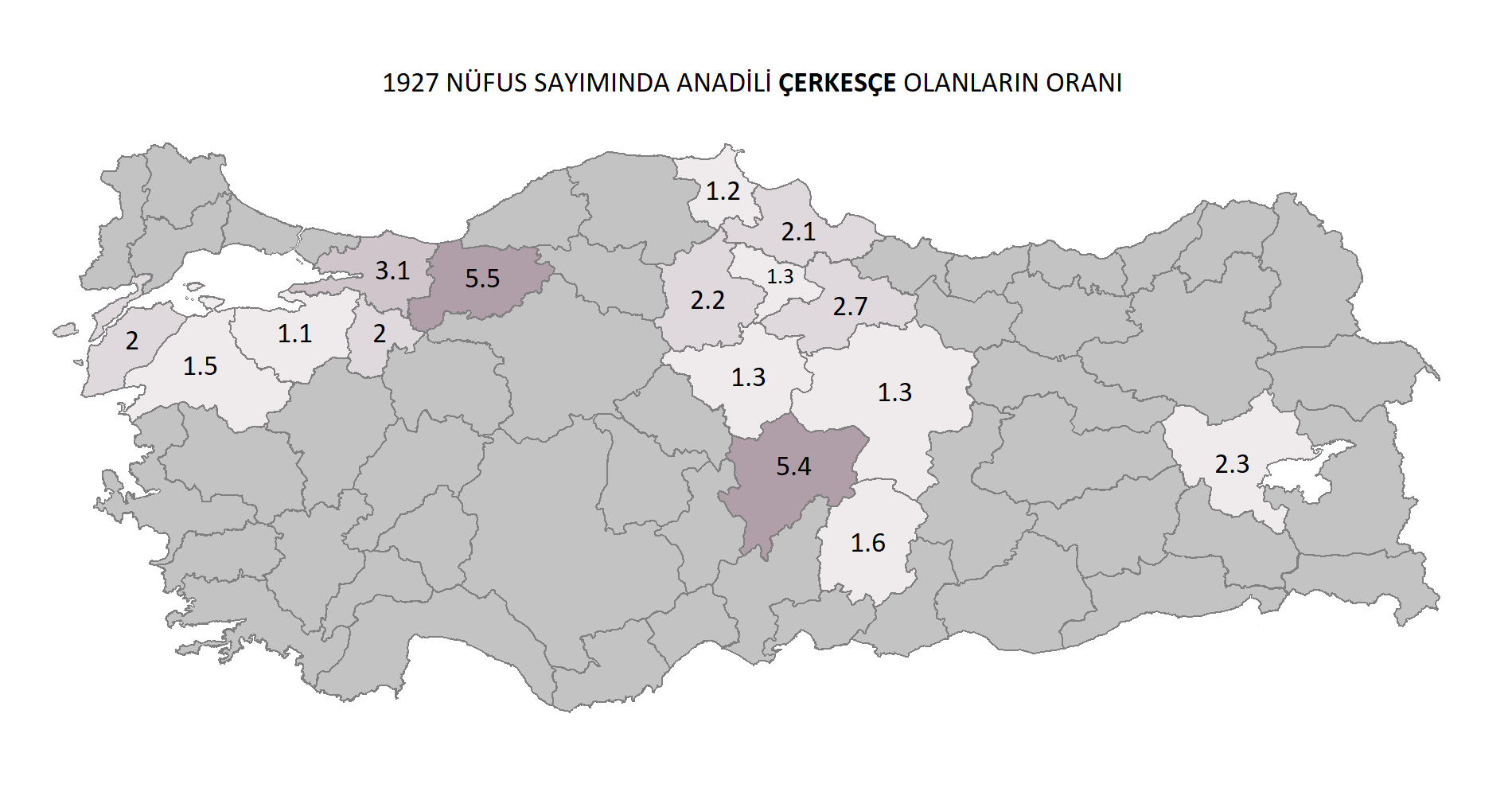
Circassian

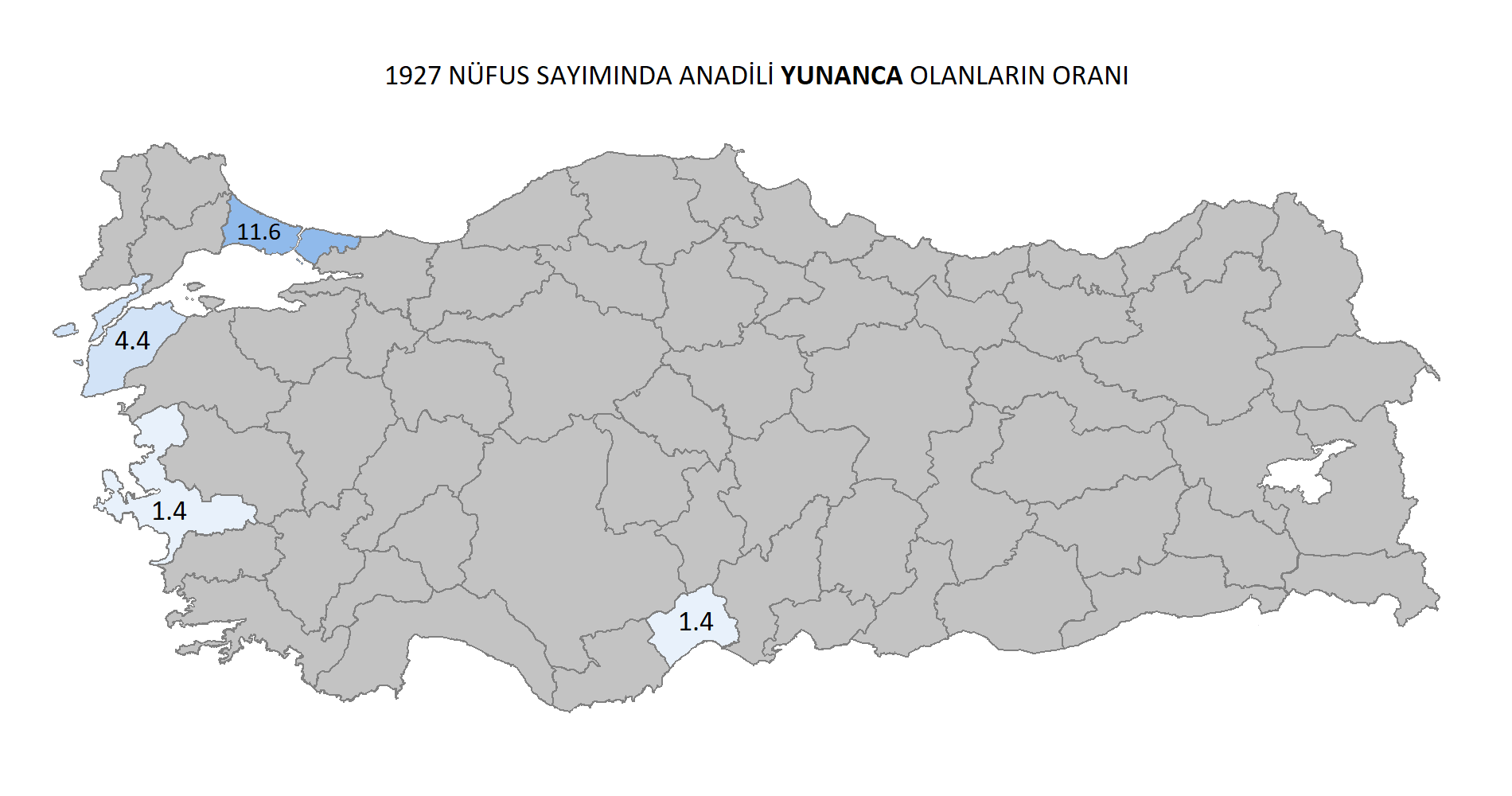
Greek

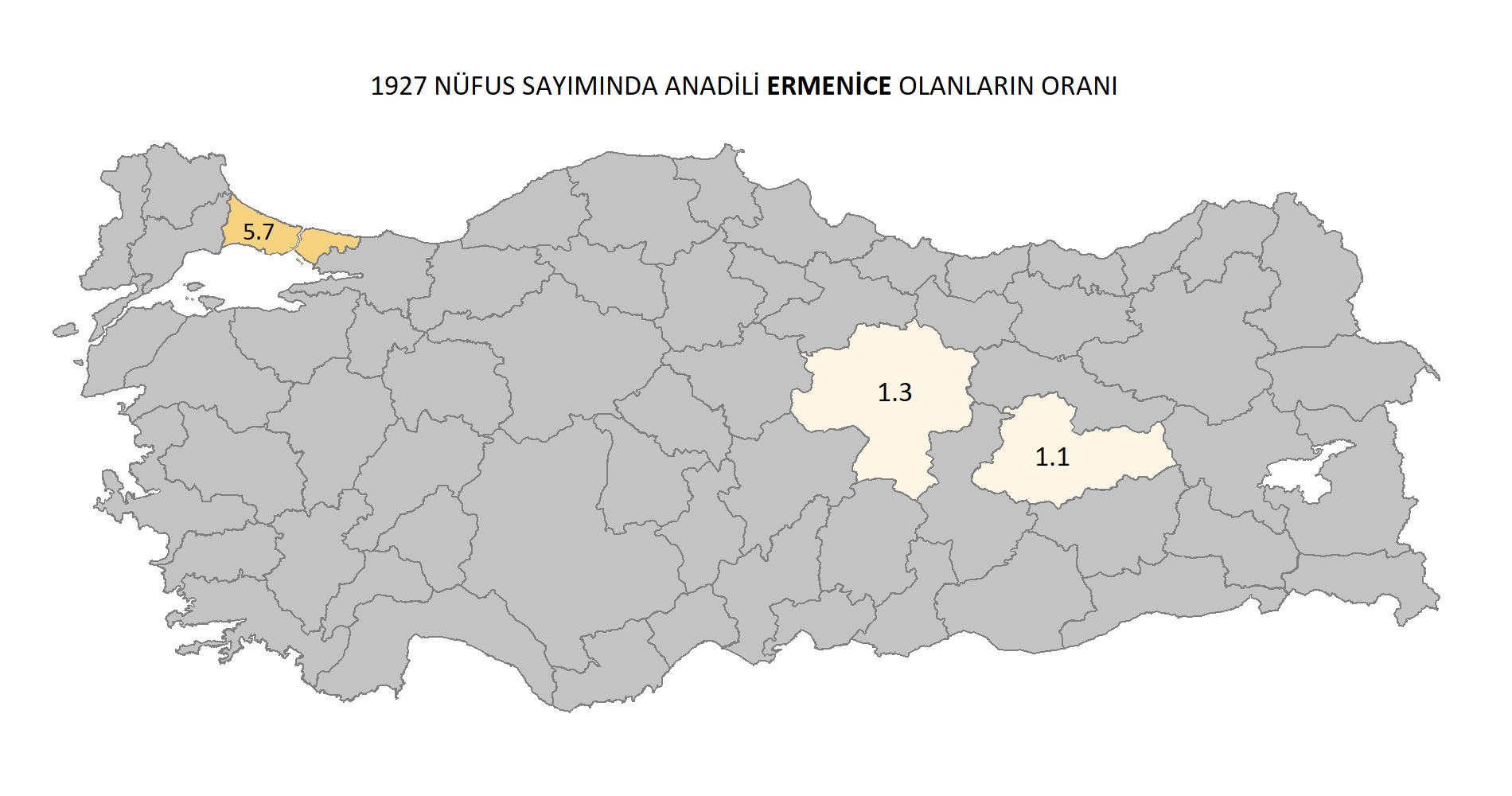
Armenian

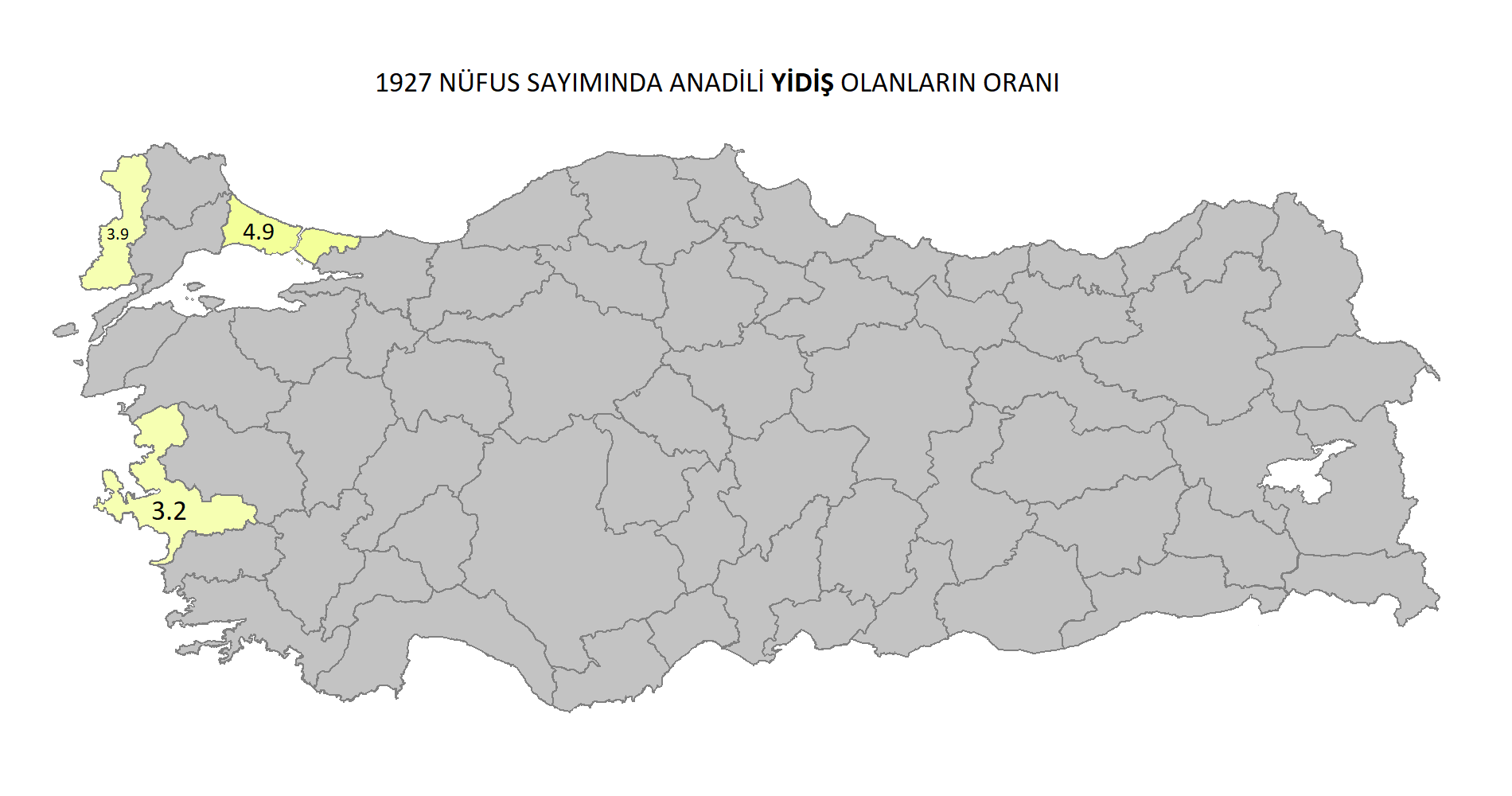
Yiddish

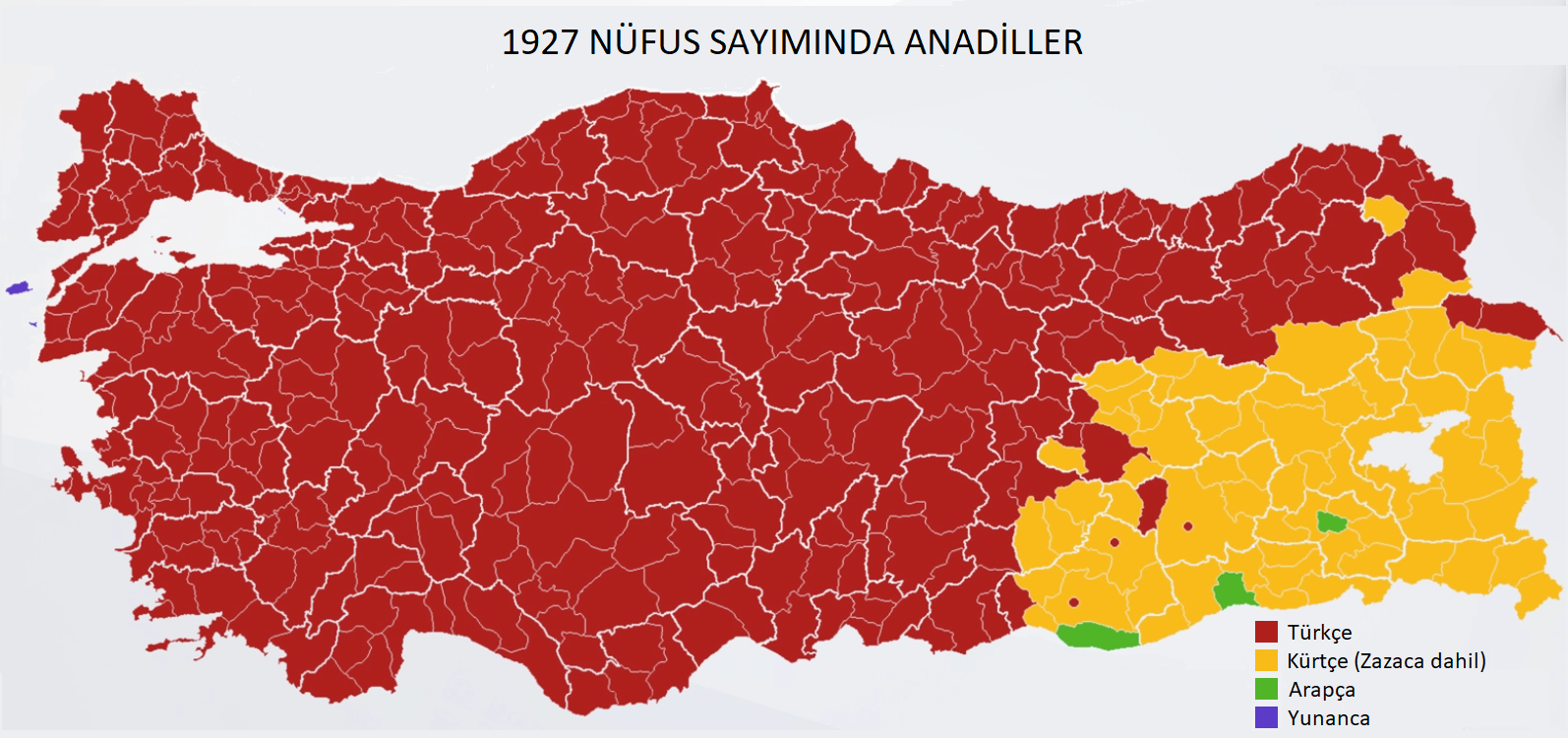
Districts by predominant language

=== 1935 Census ===
Main article: 1935 Turkish Census

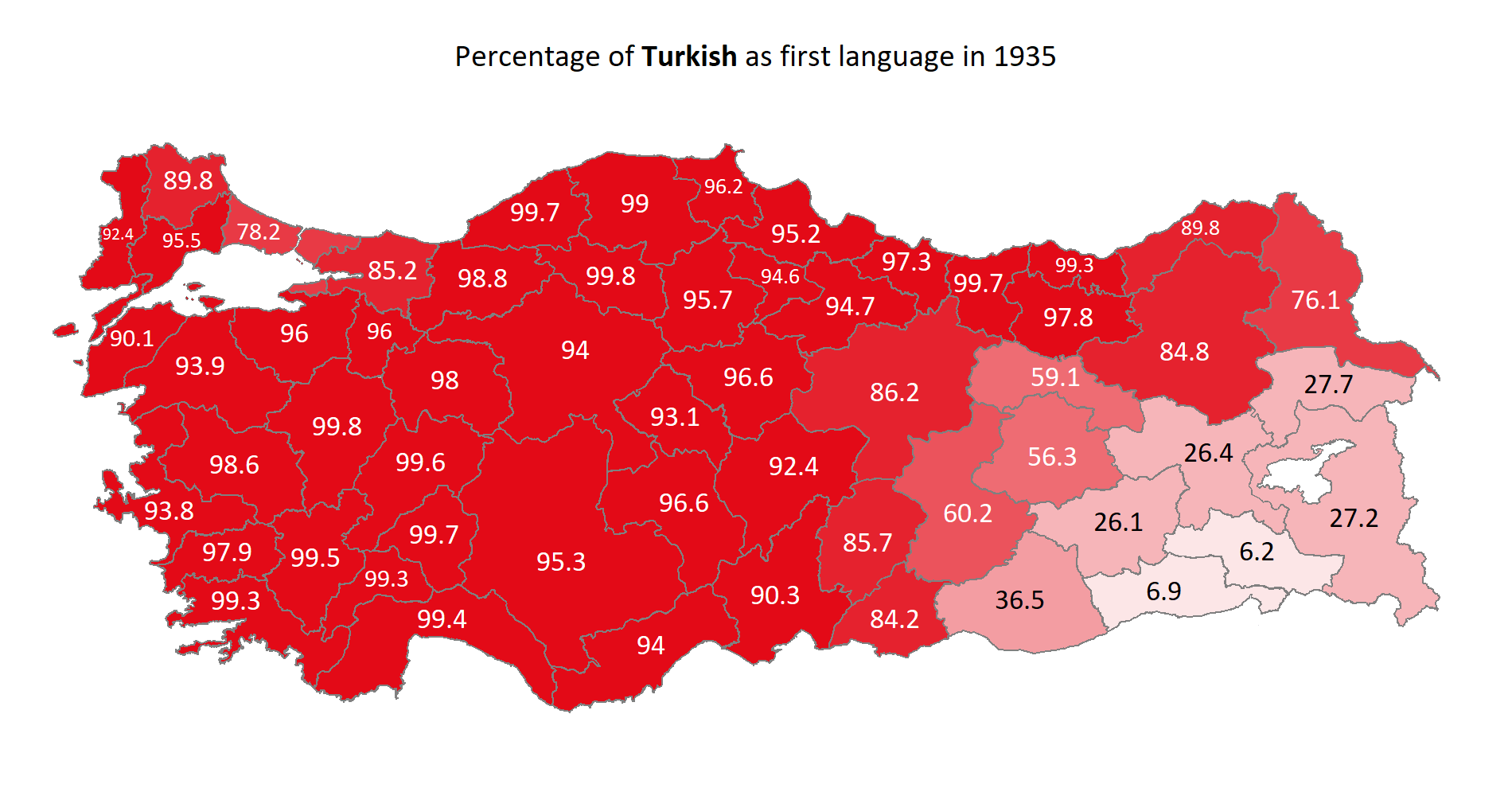

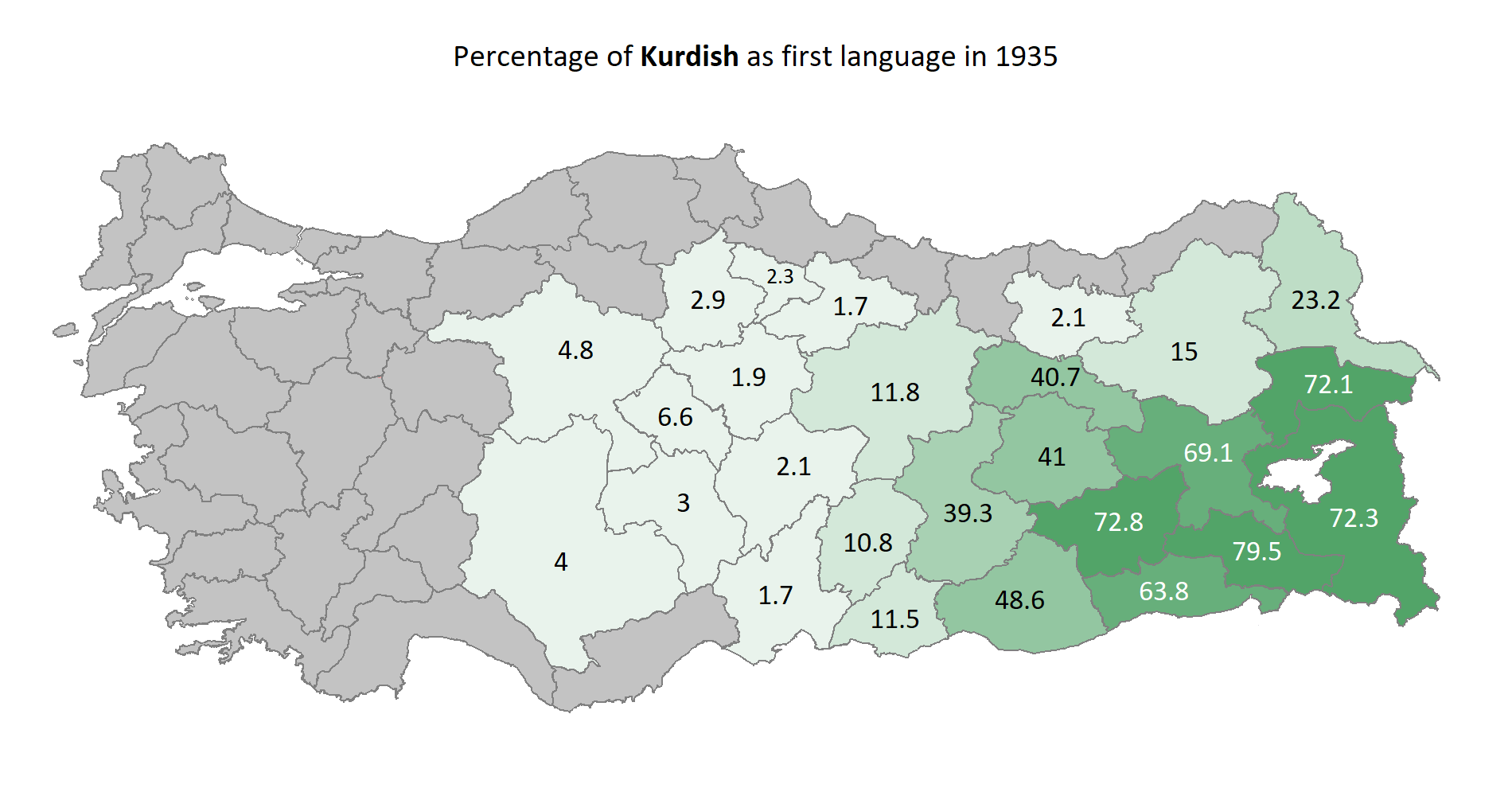

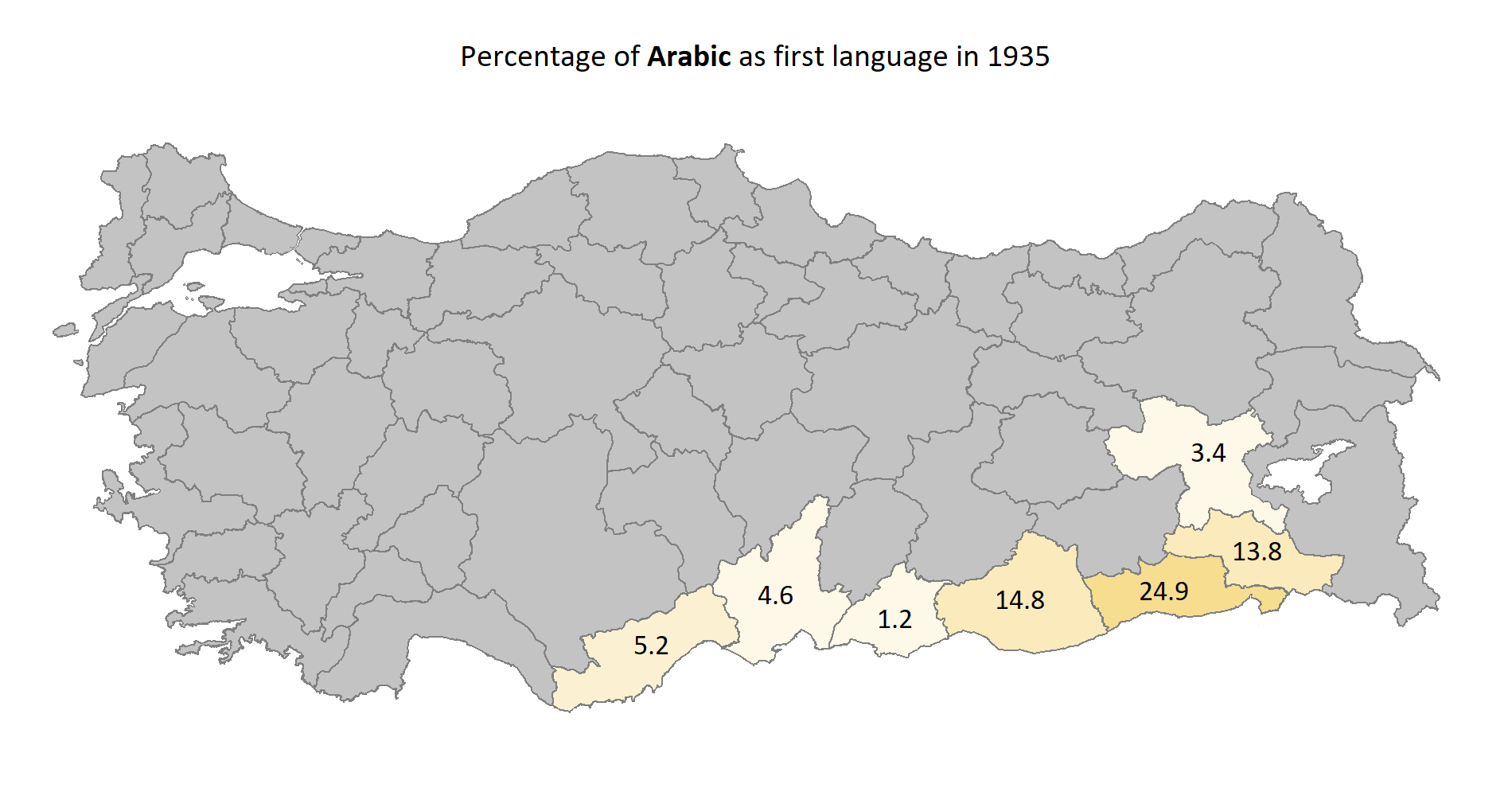

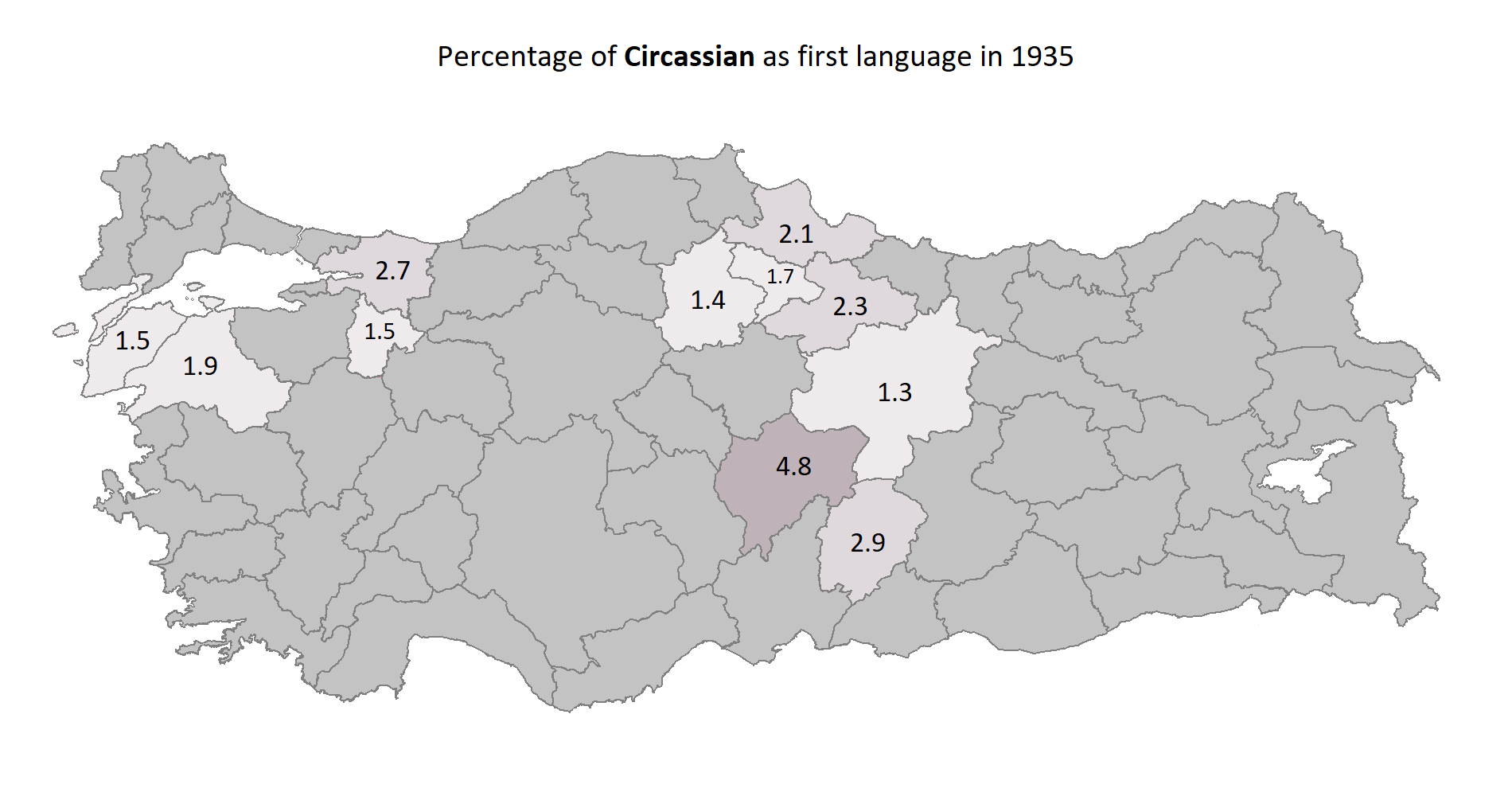

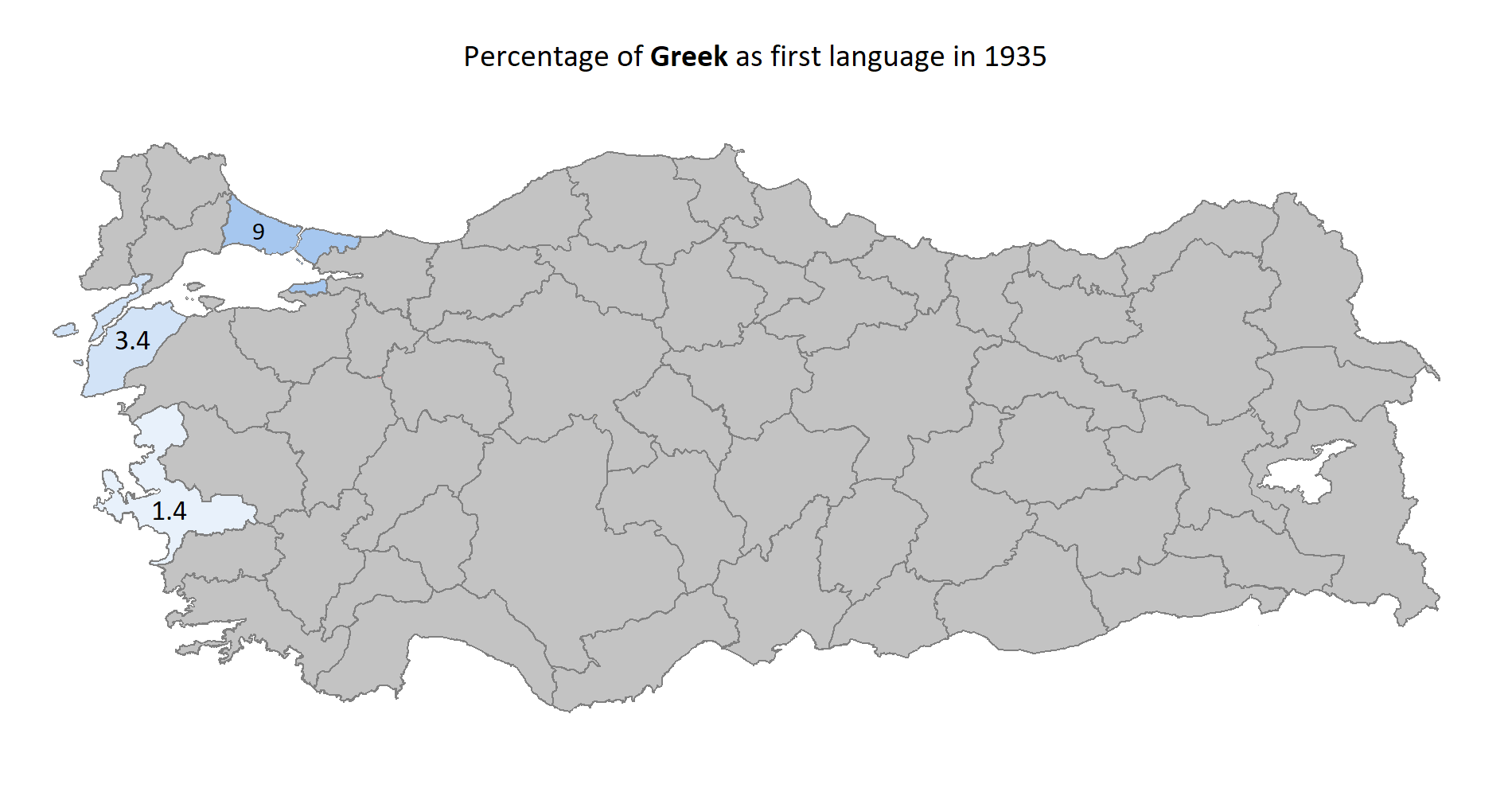

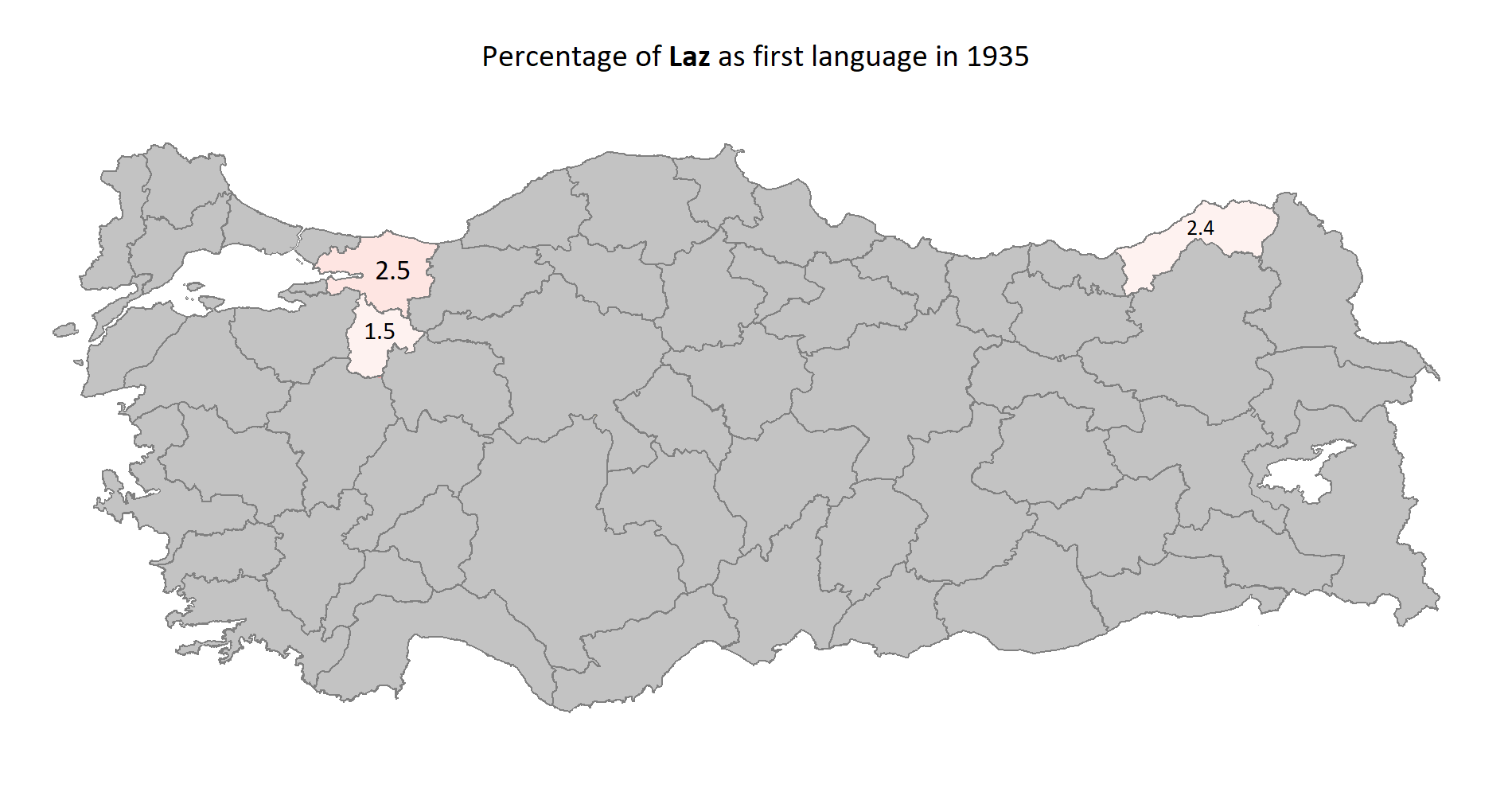

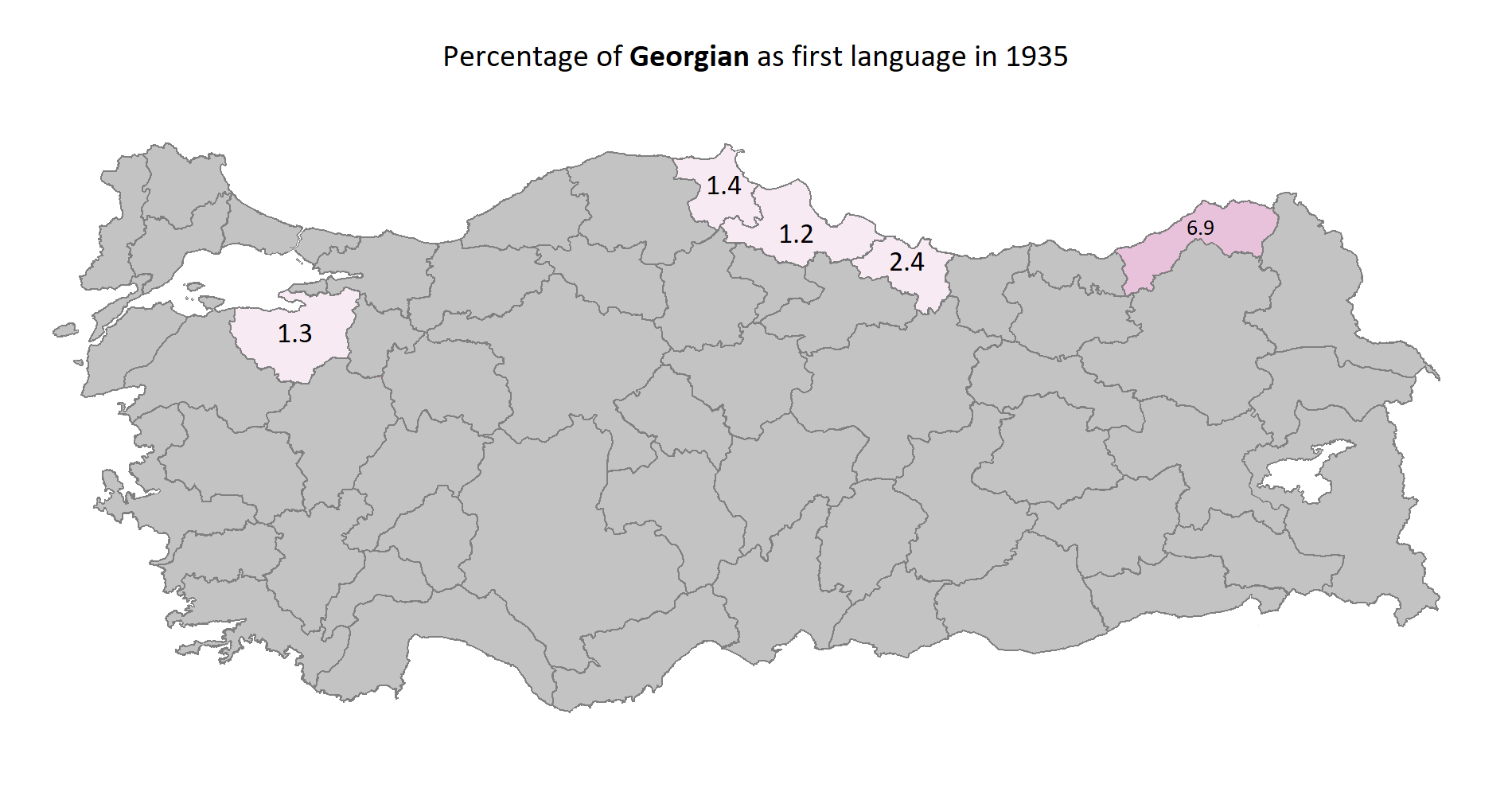

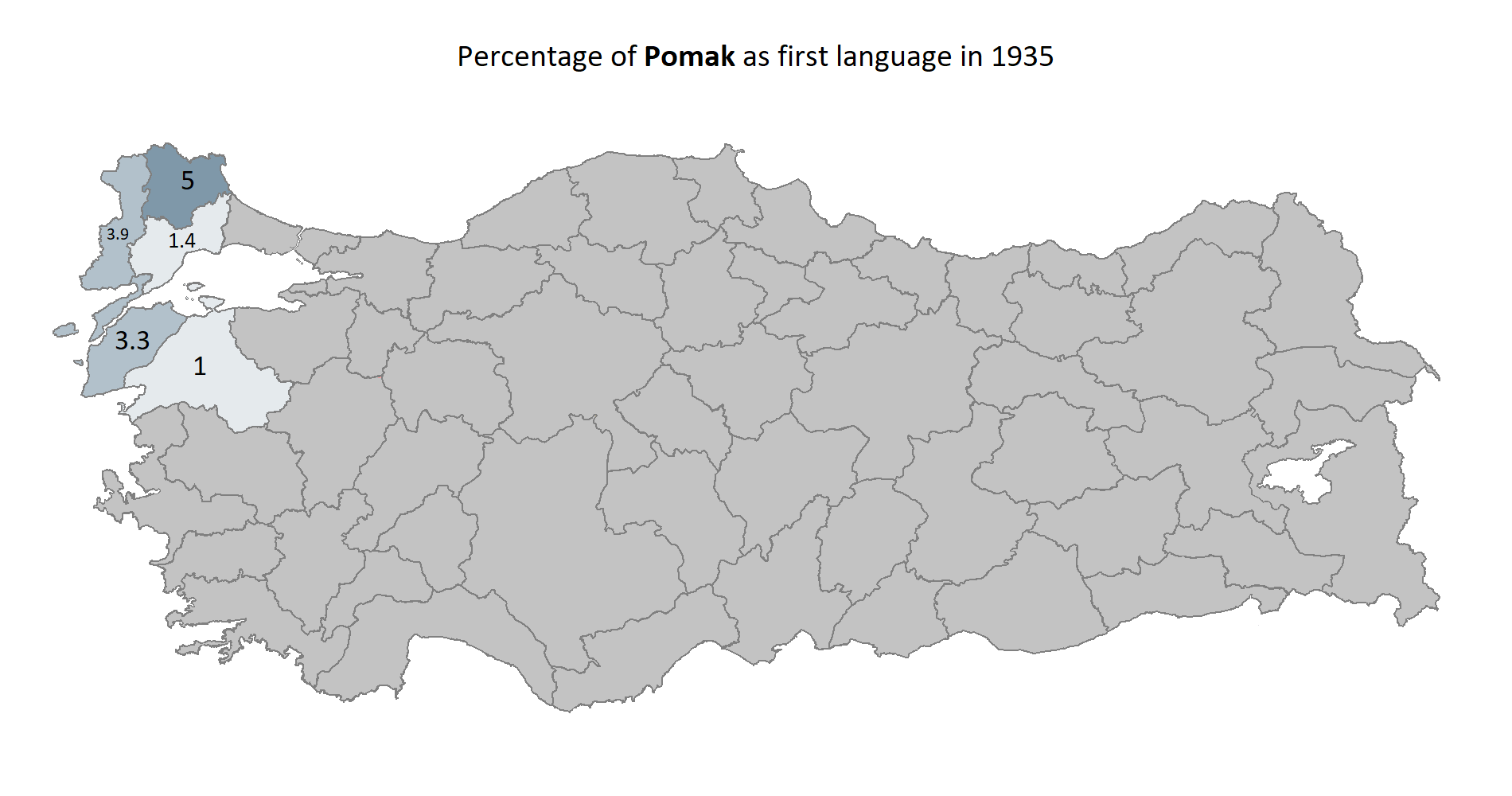

=== 1965 Census ===
Languages spoken in Turkey, 1965 census
Language	Mother tongue	Only language spoken	Second best language spoken
Abaza	4,563	280	7,556
Albanian	12,832	1,075	39,613
Arabic	365,340	189,134	167,924
Armenian	33,094	1,022	22,260
Bosnian	17,627	2,345	34,892
Bulgarian	4,088	350	46,742
Pomak	23,138	2,776	34,234
Chechen	7,563	2,500	5,063
Circassian	58,339	6,409	48,621
Croatian	45	1	1,585
Czech	168	25	76
Dutch	366	23	219
English	27,841	21,766	139,867
French	3,302	398	96,879
Georgian	34,330	4,042	44,934
German	4,901	790	35,704
Greek	48,096	3,203	78,941
Italian	2,926	267	3,861
Kurdish (Kurmanji)	2,219,502	1,323,690	429,168
Judæo-Spanish	9,981	283	3,510
Laz	26,007	3,943	55,158
Persian	948	72	2,103
Polish	110	20	377
Portuguese	52	5	3,233
Romanian	406	53	6,909
Russian	1,088	284	4,530
Serbian	6,599	776	58,802
Spanish	2,791	138	4,297
Turkish	28,289,680	26,925,649	1,387,139
Zaza	150,644	92,288	20,413
Total	31,009,934	28,583,607	2,786,610

Languages spoken in Turkey by provinces, 1965 census
Province / Language	Turkish	Kurdish	Arabic	Zazaki	Circassian	Greek	Georgian	Armenian	Laz	Pomak	Bosnian	Albanian	Jewish
Adana (including Osmaniye)	866,316	7,581	22,356	332	51	51	0	28	9	0	312	483	29
Adıyaman	143,054	117,325	7	6,705	0	0	0	84	4	0	0	0	0
Afyonkarahisar	499,461	125	19	1	2,172	169	2	2	1	16	14	2	1
Ağrı	90,021	156,316	105	4	2	2	77	5	0	1	103	0	0
Amasya	279,978	2,179	9	2	1,497	6	1,378	208	6	0	10	336	1
Ankara (including Kırıkkale and parts of Aksaray)	1,590,392	36,798	814	21	393	124	41	66	120	7	126	833	64
Antalya	486,697	23	2	0	0	14	0	0	2	0	0	1	0
Artvin	190,183	46	4	0	0	4	7,698	1	12,093	1	1	0	0
Aydın	523,583	168	85	0	112	71	4	1	4	0	26	88	0
Balıkesir	698,679	560	38	8	3,144	236	1,273	9	205	1,707	314	24	4
Bilecik	137,674	5	4	0	736	4	73	1	1	2	6	3	0
Bingöl	62,668	56,881	19	30,878	17	0	1	11	1	0	0	0	3
Bitlis	56,161	92,327	3,263	2,082	205	1	5	16	0	0	0	1	2
Bolu (including Düzce)	375,786	363	0	0	1,593	3	1,541	488	1,791	0	40	6	1
Burdur	194,910	2	7	0	0	3	12	0	0	0	0	1	0
Bursa (including parts of Yalova)	746,633	213	22	0	799	106	2,938	35	517	65	1,169	1,928	69
Çanakkale	338,379	443	0	25	1,604	5,258	4	9	12	3,675	516	6	121
Çankırı (including parts of Karabük)	250,510	158	1	0	0	1	0	3	2	0	0	0	0
Çorum	474,638	8,736	4	0	1,808	12	8	51	3	7	0	0	0
Denizli	462,860	283	28	5	8	97	1	1	0	2	1	3	0
Diyarbakır	178,644	236,113	2,536	57,693	1	1	3	134	3	48	1	5	0
Edirne	290,610	386	104	21	9	18	2	12	3	10,285	329	58	92
Elazığ	244,016	47,446	17	30,921	0	2	0	2	30	12	3	2	0
Erzincan	243,911	14,323	13	298	4	5	0	12	2	3	0	1	0
Erzurum	555,632	69,648	86	2,185	109	8	4	11	24	7	1	5	1
Eskişehir	406,212	327	42	0	1,390	4	3	0	14	23	114	78	0
Gaziantep	490,046	18,954	885	1	4	6	0	4	3	0	1	11	0
Giresun	425,665	305	1	1	2	0	2,029	0	5	0	0	0	0
Gümüşhane (including Bayburt)	260,419	2,189	0	0	91	0	0	0	17	0	0	0	0
Hakkari (including parts of Şırnak)	10,357	72,365	165	0	1	0	1	21	2	0	0	0	0
Hatay	350,080	5,695	127,072	7	780	767	11	376	6	2	8	44	1
Isparta	265,305	688	75	11	8	91	0	1	2	1	1	3	4
Mersin	500,207	1,067	9,430	23	76	137	13	12	19	3	3	9	1
İstanbul (including parts of Yalova)	2,185,741	2,586	2,843	26	317	35,097	849	29,479	128	165	3,072	4,341	8,608
İzmir	1,214,219	863	352	5	1,287	898	15	17	15	1,289	2,349	1,265	753
Kars (including Ardahan and Iğdır)	471,287	133,144	61	992	215	6	8	5	24	1	5	4	1
Kastamonu	439,355	1,090	2	0	3	2	180	849	1	0	0	0	0
Kayseri	509,932	8,454	34	8	17,110	1	1	9	6	9	15	160	1
Kırklareli	252,594	602	136	24	5	3	5	3	7	3,375	1,148	144	11
Kırşehir	185,489	11,309	4	0	2	0	0	0	1	0	1	0	0
Kocaeli (including 3 villages of İstanbul and parts of Yalova)	320,808	235	0	10	1,467	63	2,755	46	2,264	381	3,827	22	7
Konya (including Karaman)	1,092,819	27,811	67	4	1,139	3	7	1	5	1	11	75	0
Kütahya	397,221	105	13	2	17	4	2	88	9	0	0	34	0
Malatya	374,449	77,794	33	10	14	5	7	148	5	4	0	3	0
Manisa	746,514	241	15	0	488	42	67	2	6	54	116	192	3
Kahramanmaraş	386,010	46,548	21	0	4,185	0	0	13	3	0	0	9	0
Mardin (including parts of Batman and Şırnak)	35,494	265,328	79,687	60	75	11	15	11	0	0	1	6	0
Muğla	334,883	6	4	1	0	28	0	0	0	1	0	0	4
Muş	110,555	83,020	3,575	507	898	0	1	3	103	0	0	0	0
Nevşehir	203,156	22	0	0	0	0	0	0	0	0	0	22	0
Niğde (including Aksaray)	353,146	8,991	10	0	227	5	0	12	4	0	15	4	0
Ordu	538,978	12	0	0	5	0	4,815	34	0	1	0	1	0
Rize	275,291	11	1	1	0	9	4	0	5,754	1	0	1	0
Sakarya (including 1 village of Düzce)	388,481	2,163	32	3	538	6	4,535	2	2,671	23	2,899	794	1
Samsun	747,115	1,366	3	0	3,401	91	2,350	5	51	319	10	610	0
Siirt (including parts of Batman and Şırnak)	46,722	179,023	38,273	484	1	0	15	98	3	0	10	0	0
Sinop	261,341	2,126	0	0	659	1	1,144	228	3	5	0	7	3
Sivas	649,099	32,284	19	23	2,086	0	0	217	1	0	515	0	0
Tekirdağ (including 1 village of İstanbul)	284,222	548	76	18	5	19	52	8	2	1,627	6	51	102
Tokat	483,948	3,974	7	3	5,934	0	367	45	2	0	0	964	0
Trabzon	590,799	72	12	0	0	4,535	1	11	0	0	0	0	0
Tunceli	120,553	33,431	20	2,370	28	0	0	4	0	18	10	8	0
Şanlıurfa	207,652	175,100	51,090	14,554	3	0	5	2	4	0	2	0	0
Uşak	190,506	16	2	0	1	0	0	4	1	0	0	0	0
Van	118,481	147,694	557	3	1	2	1	1	8	0	1	1	66
Yozgat	433,385	2,424	1	0	1,597	2	0	118	0	0	14	1	0
Zonguldak (including Bartın and parts of Karabük)	649,757	43	26	0	5	17	2	3	15	0	1	1	1

Provinces with Turkish speakers in majority Provinces with Turkish speakers in plurality Provinces with Kurdish speakers in plurality Provinces with Kurdish speakers in majority

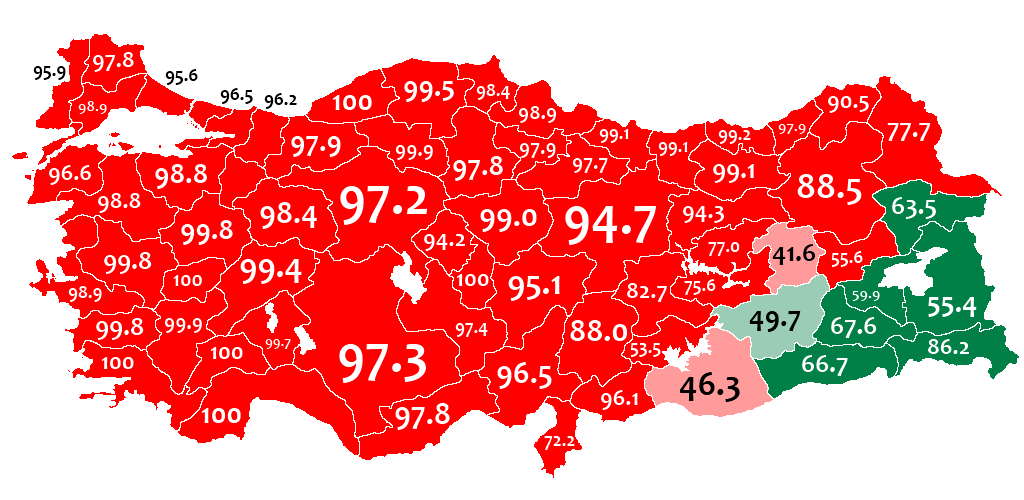
Turkish- and Kurdish-speaking pluralities

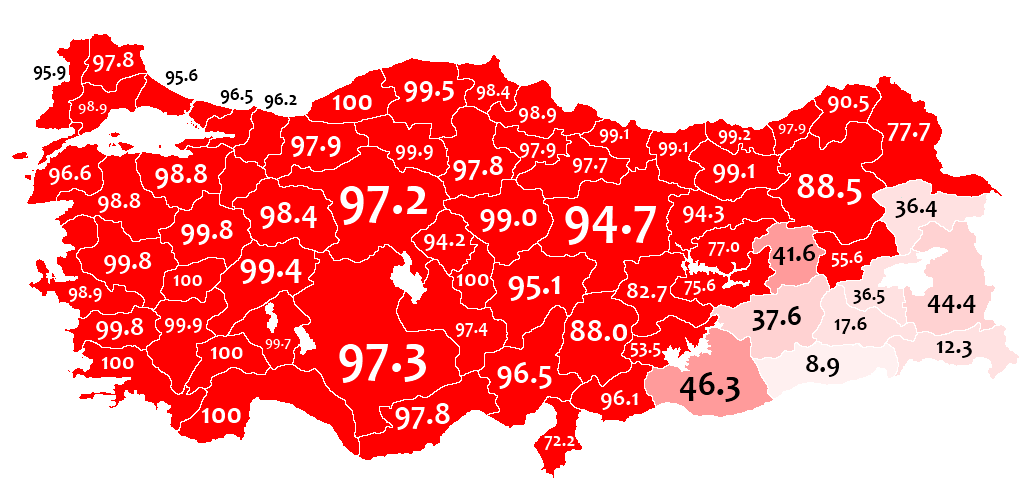
Turkish-speaking population

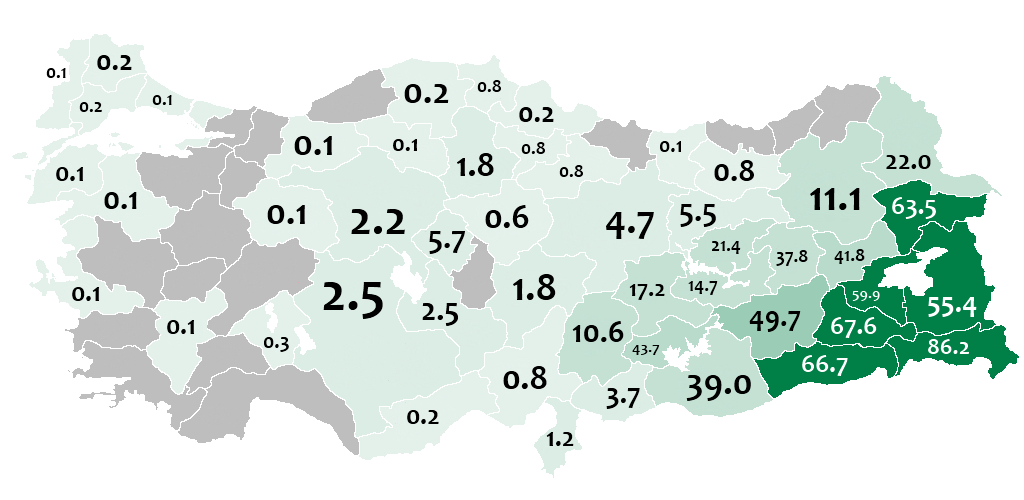
Kurdish-speaking population

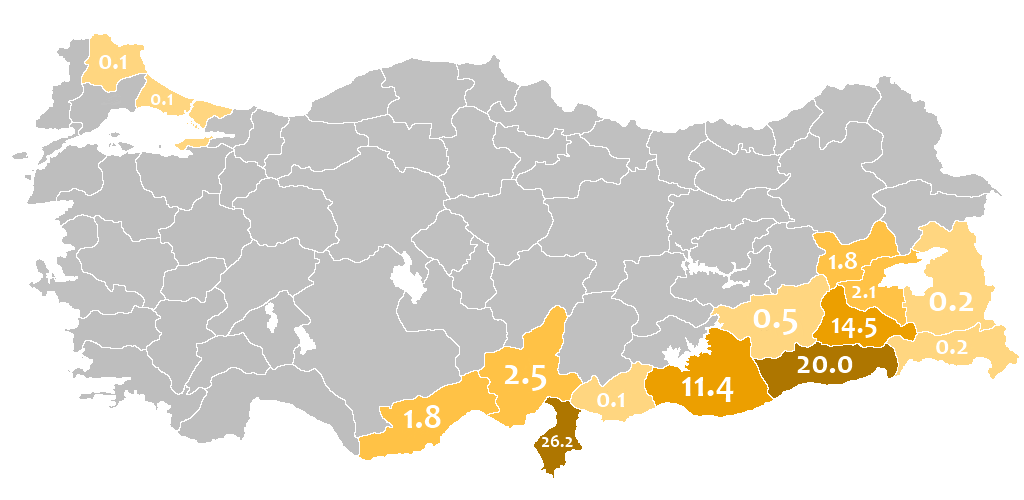
Arabic-speaking population

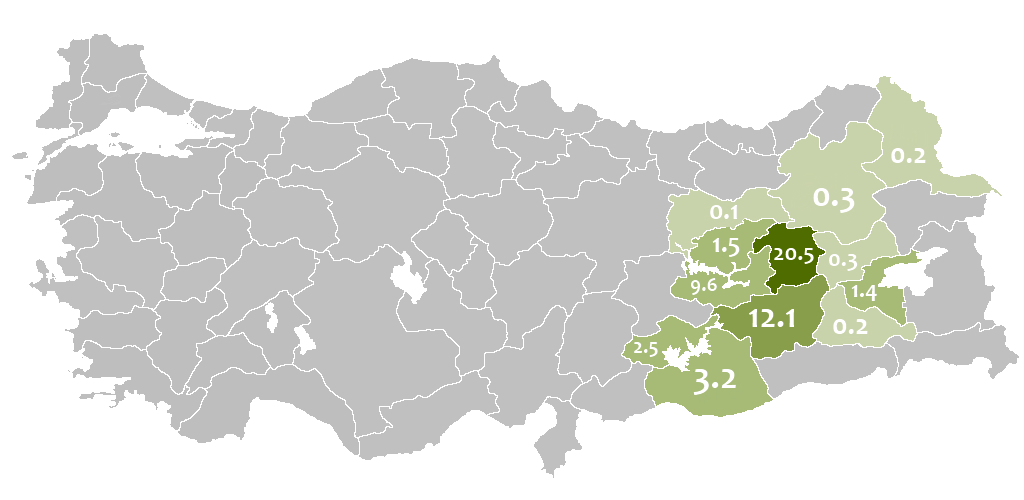
Zaza-speaking population

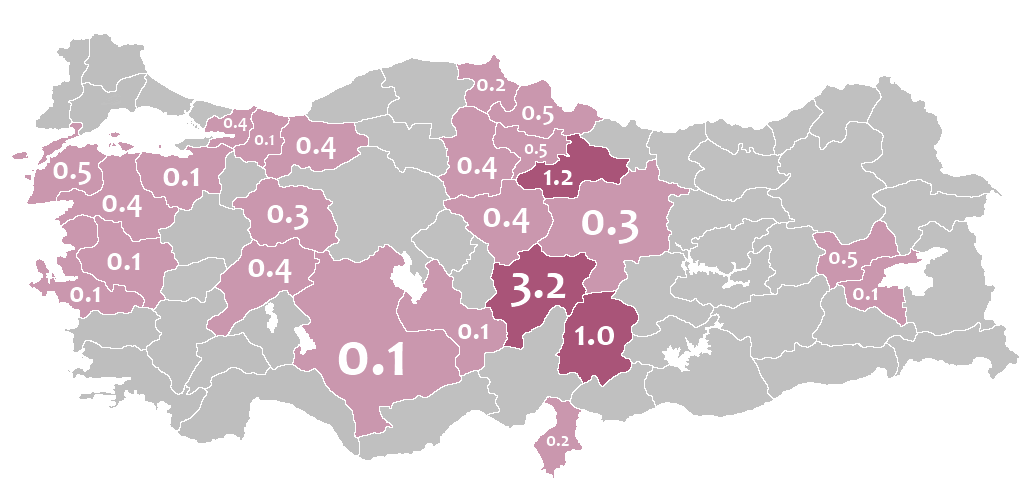
Circassian-speaking population

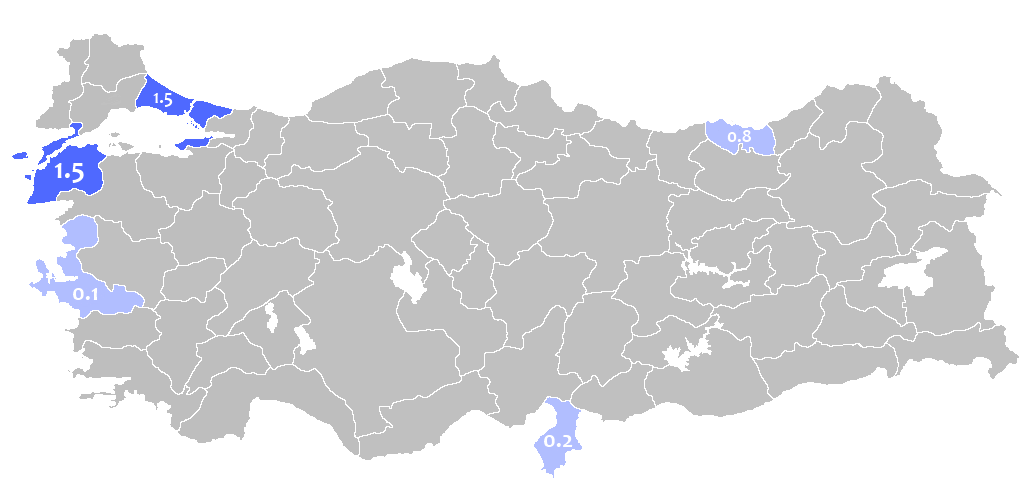
Greek-speaking population

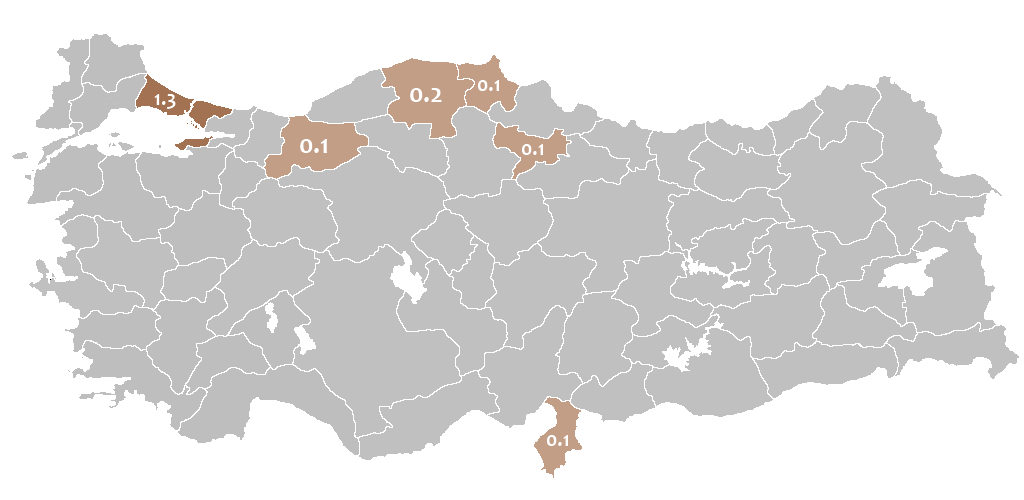
Armenian-speaking population

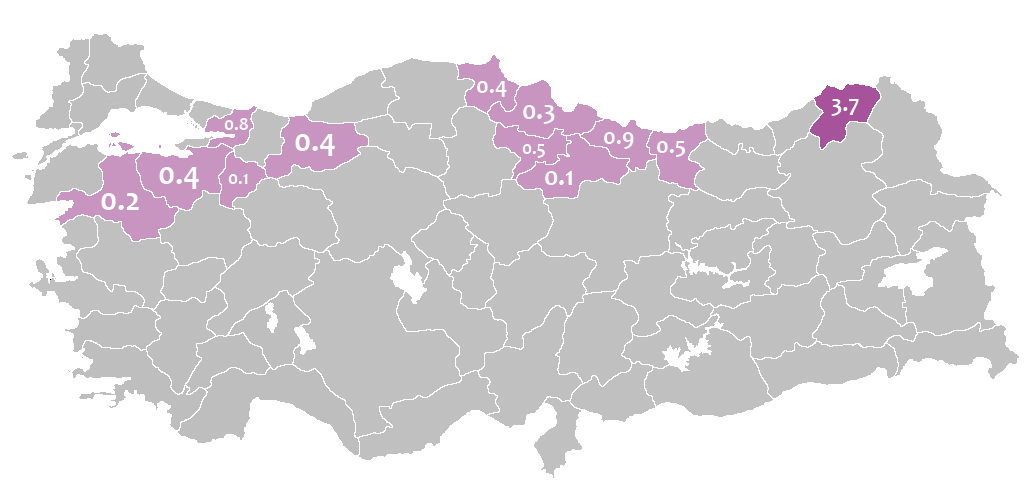
Georgian-speaking population

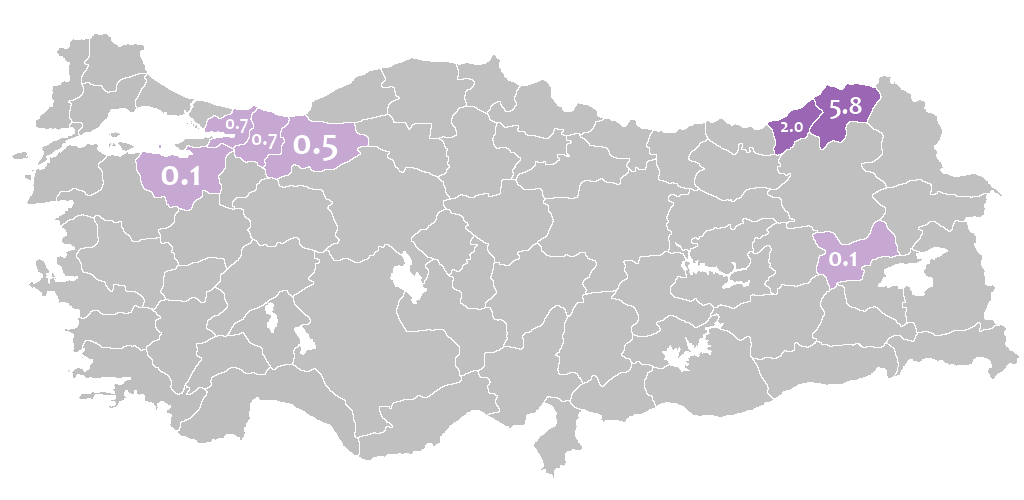
Laz-speaking population

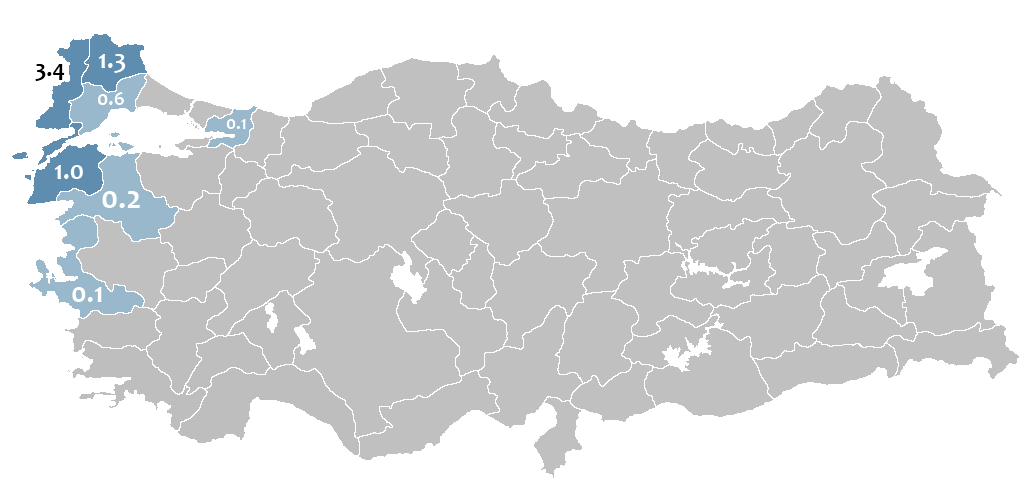
Pomak-speaking population

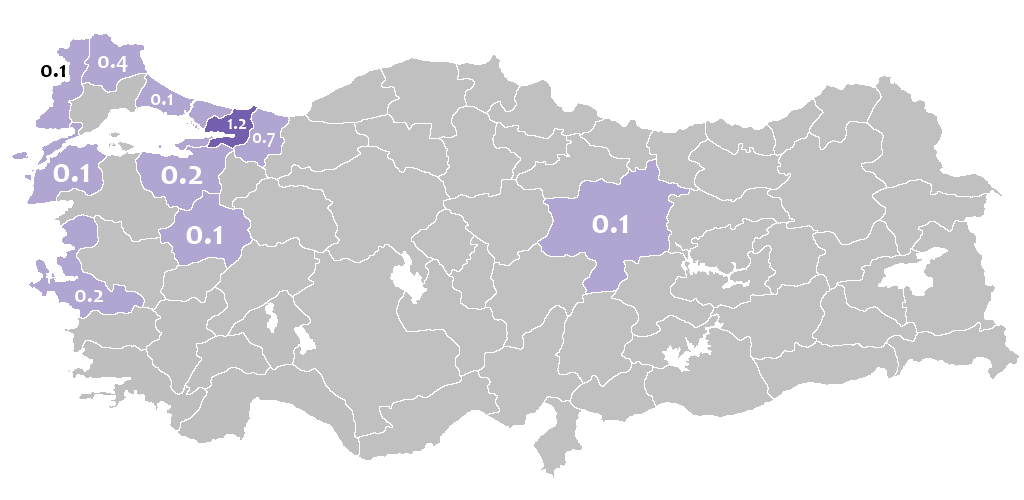
Bosnian-speaking population

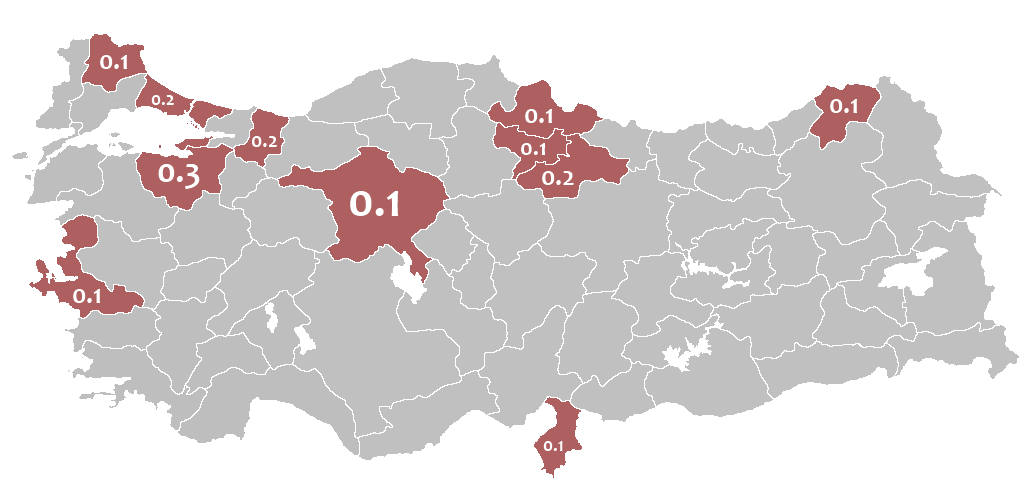
Albanian-speaking population

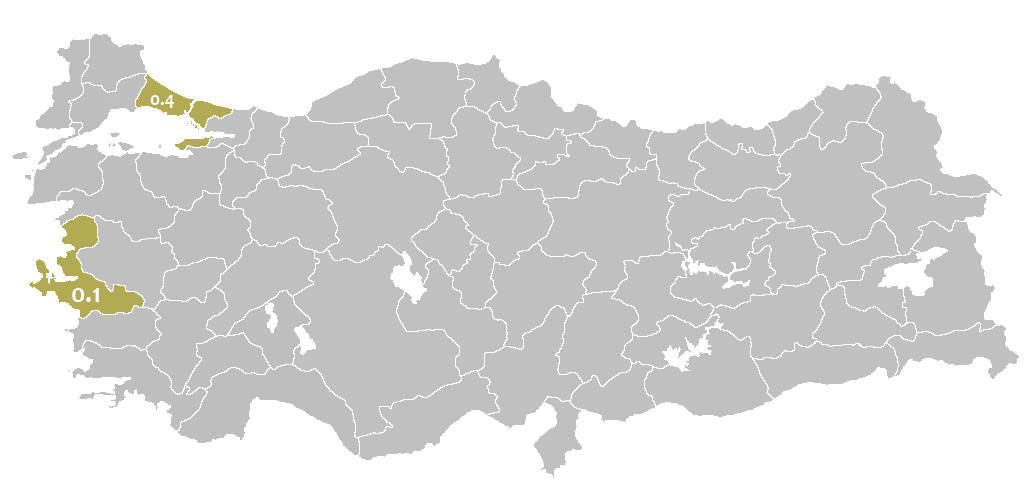
Ladino-speaking population

=== KONDA, 2006 ===
The following table lists the mother tongues of people in Turkey by percentage of their speakers.

Mother tongues in Turkey
Mother tongue	Percentage
Turkish	84.54
Kurdish (Kurmanji)	11.97
Arabic	1.38
Zazaki	1.01
Other Turkic languages	0.28
Balkan languages	0.23
Laz	0.12
Circassian languages	0.11
Armenian	0.07
Other Caucasian languages	0.07
Greek	0.06
West European languages	0.03
Jewish languages	0.01
Other	0.12

=== Ethnologue ===
Ethnologue lists many minority and immigrant languages in Turkey some of which are spoken by large numbers of people.

Languages by number of speakers in Turkey (with Expanded Graded Intergenerational Disruption Scale)
Family	Language	ISO	Speakers	Status (EGIDS)^{[a]}	Notes
Oghuz	Turkish	tur	83,440,000 (2019)	1 (National)	
Iranian	Northern Kurdish	kmr	9,000,000 ▼ (2019)	6b (Threatened)	3,000,000 monolinguals
Arabic	Levantine Arabic	apc	4,250,000 (2021)	6b (Threatened)	The vast majority of speakers are Syrian refugees and migrants.
Iranian	Southern Zazaki	diq	1,280,000 ▼ (2019)	6b (Threatened)	
Circassian	Kabardian	kbd	1,170,000 (2019)	6b (Threatened)	Non-indigenous
Arabic	Modern Standard Arabic	arb	686,000 (2015)	4 (Educational)	Non-indigenous
Iranian	Persian	pes	682,000 (2019)	—	Non-indigenous
Slavic	Russian	rus	600,000 (2012)	—	Non-indigenous
Oghuz	South Azerbaijani	azb	596,000 (2019)	5 (Dispersed)	
Arabic	North Mesopotamian Arabic	ayp	574,000 (2019)	6a (Vigorous)	Do not read Arabic
Oghuz	Balkan Gagauz Turkish	bgx	460,000 (2019)	7 (Shifting)	
Slavic	Pomak Bulgarian	bul	395,000 (2019)	5 (Dispersed)	
Circassian	Adyghe	ady	349,000 (2019)	6b (Threatened)	Non-indigenous
Iranian	Northern Zazaki	kiu	203,000 (2019)	6b (Threatened)	
Karto-Zan	Georgian	kat	167,000 (2019)	6b (Threatened)	
Slavic	Bosnian	bos	112,000 (2019)	—	Non-indigenous
Arabic	Mesopotamian Arabic	acm	112,000 (2019)	6a (Vigorous)	Non-indigenous
Nakh	Chechen	che	112,000 (2019)	—	Non-indigenous
Kipchak	Crimean Tatar	crh	110,000 (2019)	6b (Threatened)	Non-indigenous
Kipchak	Karakalpak	kaa	81,700 (2019)	—	Non-indigenous
Indo-Aryan	Balkan Romani	rmn	72,900 (2019)	6a (Vigorous)	Non-indigenous
Albanian	Tosk Albanian	als	72,900 (2019)	6b (Threatened)	Non-indigenous
Armenian	Western Armenian	hyw	67,300 (2019)	6b (Threatened)	
Abazgi	Abkhaz	abk	48,600 (2019)	6b (Threatened)	Non-indigenous
Germanic	English	eng	47,000 (2019)	—	Non-indigenous
Iranian	Digor Ossetian	oss	41,000 (2019)	6b (Threatened)	Non-indigenous
Slavic	Macedonian	mkd	35,000 (2019)	—	Non-indigenous
Kipchak	Tatar	tat	28,700 (2019)	5 (Dispersed)	Non-indigenous
Neo-Aramaic	Assyrian Neo-Aramaic	aii	27,600 (2019)	—	Non-indigenous
Indo-Aryan	Urdu	urd	24,300 (2019)	—	Non-indigenous
Karto-Zan	Lazuri	lzz	20,000 (2007)	6b (Threatened)	
Neo-Aramaic	Turoyo	tru	16,600 (2019)	6b (Threatened)	
Italic	Spanish	spa	16,000 (2019)	—	Non-indigenous
Abazgi	Abaza	abq	13,200 (2019)	6b (Threatened)	Non-indigenous
Kipchak	Kazakh	kaz	8,500 (2019)	5 (Dispersed)	Non-indigenous
Italic	Ladino	lad	8,000 (2018)	7 (Shifting)	Non-indigenous
Germanic	German	deu	6,700 (2019)	—	Non-indigenous
Slavic	Serbian	srp	5,000 (2019)	6b (Threatened)	Non-indigenous
Greek	Pontic Greek	pnt	5,000 (2015)	7 (Shifting)	
Italic	French	fra	4,300 (2019)	—	Non-indigenous
Karluk	Southern Uzbek	uzs	4,200 (2019)	5 (Dispersed)	Non-indigenous
Greek	Greek	ell	4,000 (2019)	5 (Dispersed)	Non-indigenous, due to emigration
Kipchak	Kumyk	kum	1,600 (2021)	6b (Threatened)	Non-indigenous
Lezgic	Lezgi	lez	1,200 (1996)	—	Non-indigenous
Neo-Aramaic	Hértevin	hrt	4 (2012)	8b (Nearly extinct)	
Oghuz	Turkmen	tuk	—	5 (Dispersed)	Non-indigenous
Kipchak	Kyrgyz	kir	—	5 (Dispersed)	Non-indigenous
Karluk	Uyghur	uig	—	5 (Dispersed)	Non-indigenous
Indo-Aryan	Domari	rmt	—	6b (Threatened)	
Albanian	Gheg Albanian	aln	—	5 (Dispersed)	Non-indigenous
Neo-Aramaic	Syriac	syc	0	9 (Dormant)	
Ubykh	Ubykh	uby	0	10 (Extinct)	Last speaker died in 1992

Not included in the report by Ethnologue is the Megleno-Romanian language, spoken by the Megleno-Romanians, who number around 5,000 in the country.

aExpanded Graded Intergenerational Disruption Scale (EGIDS) of Ethnologue:
0 (International): "The language is widely used between nations in trade, knowledge exchange, and international policy."
1 (National): "The language is used in education, work, mass media, and government at the national level."
2 (Provincial): "The language is used in education, work, mass media, and government within major administrative subdivisions of a nation."
3 (Wider Communication): "The language is used in work and mass media without official status to transcend language differences across a region."
4 (Educational): "The language is in vigorous use, with standardization and literature being sustained through a widespread system of institutionally supported education."
5 (Developing): "The language is in vigorous use, with literature in a standardized form being used by some though this is not yet widespread or sustainable."
6a (Vigorous): "The language is used for face-to-face communication by all generations and the situation is sustainable."
6b (Threatened): "The language is used for face-to-face communication within all generations, but it is losing users."
7 (Shifting): "The child-bearing generation can use the language among themselves, but it is not being transmitted to children."
8a (Moribund): "The only remaining active users of the language are members of the grandparent generation and older."
8b (Nearly Extinct): "The only remaining users of the language are members of the grandparent generation or older who have little opportunity to use the language."
9 (Dormant): "The language serves as a reminder of heritage identity for an ethnic community, but no one has more than symbolic proficiency."
10 (Extinct): "The language is no longer used and no one retains a sense of ethnic identity associated with the language."

=== Ethnologue, 2022 ===
The following languages are listed as having 50,000 or more total speakers in Turkey according to the 2022 edition of Ethnologue. Entries identified by Ethnologue as macrolanguages (such as Arabic, Persian, Pashto, Chinese, and Zaza, encompassing all their respective varieties) are not included in this section.

Languages of Turkey, Ethnologue (25th ed., 2022) (Note: Only languages with at least 50,000 speakers are shown.)
Language	Family	Branch	First-language (L1) speakers in Turkey	Second-language (L2) speakers in Turkey	Total (L1+L2) speakers in Turkey
Adyghe	Northwest Caucasian	Circassian			349,000
Albanian, Tosk	Indo-European	Albanian			72,900
Mesopotamian Arabic	Afro-Asiatic	Semitic			112,000
North Levantine Arabic	Afro-Asiatic	Semitic			4,250,000
North Mesopotamian Arabic	Afro-Asiatic	Semitic			574,000
Modern Standard Arabic	Afro-Asiatic	Semitic			686,000
Western Armenian	Indo-European	Armenian			67,300
South Azerbaijani	Turkic	Oghuz			596,000
Balkan Gagauz Turkish	Turkic	Oghuz			460,000
Bosnian	Indo-European	Slavic			112,000
Bulgarian	Indo-European	Slavic			395,000
Chechen	Northeast Caucasian	Nakh			112,000
Crimean Tatar	Turkic	Kipchak			110,000
Georgian	Kartvelian	Karto-Zan			167,000
Kabardian	Northwest Caucasian	Circassian			1,170,000
Karakalpak	Turkic	Kipchak			81,700
Northern Kurdish	Indo-European	Iranian			9,000,000
Iranian Persian	Indo-European	Iranian			682,000
Balkan Romani	Indo-European	Indo-Aryan			72,900
Turkish	Turkic	Oghuz	77,600,000	5,840,000	83,440,000
Turkish Sign Language	Isolate	—N/a			250,000
Northern Zazaki	Indo-European	Iranian			203,000
Southern Zazaki	Indo-European	Iranian			1,280,000

== See also ==
- Demographics of Turkey

== Sources ==
- Bayır, Derya (2013). Minorities and nationalism in Turkish law. Cultural Diversity and Law. Farnham: Ashgate Publishing. ISBN 978-1-4094-7254-4.
