= South Caucasian =

South Caucasian can refer to:

- South Caucasian languages (a.k.a. the Kartvelian languages)
- Things Related to the South Caucasus, or Transcaucasia

== See also ==
- Proto-Kartvelian language, the common ancestor of the Kartvelian languages
