= Georgic (disambiguation) =

Georgic is the singular of Georgics, a poem by Virgil.

Georgic may also refer to:

- SS Georgic, a British steamship of the White Star Line
- MV Georgic, a British motorship of the White Star Line and the last ship built for the company.
- Georgic languages, a branch of the Karto-Zan languages constituted by the Georgian and its dialects, Judaeo-Georgian and Old Georgian languages
