= Citizen, speak Turkish! =

Turkish government-funded initiative

The Citizen, speak Turkish! (Turkish: Vatandaş, Türkçe konuş!) campaign was a Turkish government-funded initiative created by law students which aimed to put pressure on non-Turkish speakers to speak Turkish in public in the 1930s and onwards. In some municipalities, fines were given to those speaking in any language other than Turkish. The campaign has been considered by some authors as a significant contribution to Turkey's sociopolitical process of Turkification.

== Political background ==
During the Ottoman Empire in 1911, the Committee of Union and Progress decided to employ the Turkish language in all the schools of the Empire, with the aim to denationalize all the non-Turkish communities and instill patriotism among Turks. The reformation of the state schooling system and of language by the compulsory use of demotic Turkish aimed for the linguistic homogenization of society. The standardization of the Turkish language aimed to sever the link with the Ottoman language and past in order to create a new sense of Turkish nationhood.

When the Turkish Republic was founded, nationalism and secularism were two of the founding principals. Mustafa Kemal Atatürk, the leader of the early years of the Republic, aimed to create a nation state (Turkish: ulus) from the Turkish remnants of the Ottoman Empire. Kemalist ideology defines the "Turkish People" as "those who protect and promote the moral, spiritual, cultural and humanistic values of the Turkish Nation." Kemalist criteria for national identity or simply being a Turk also refers to a shared language. In 1931 in a speech in Adana, Atatürk was quoted during a speech as saying:

One of the most obvious, precious qualities of a nation is language. A person who says he belongs to the Turkish nation should in the first place and under all circumstances speak Turkish. It is not possible to believe a person's claims that he belongs to the Turkish nation and to Turkish culture if he does not speak Turkish.

— Mustafa Kemal Atatürk

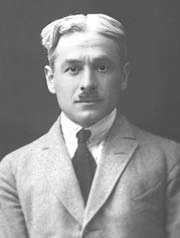
Hamdullah Suphi Tanrıöver believed that minorities could not be accepted as citizens of Turkey if they did not speak Turkish or accepted Turkish culture.

Many Turkish politicians and intellectuals believed that in order to attain full rights as a Turkish citizen, one must learn and speak Turkish. One such intellect, Hamdullah Suphi Tanrıöver, believed especially that minorities could not be accepted as citizens of Turkey if they did not speak Turkish or accepted Turkish culture. Consequently, non-Turkish languages taught in minority schools were becoming less common, whereas in May 1923, the Turkish Ministry of Education made the teaching of the Turkish language, history, and geography compulsory in all non-Muslim schools.

In 1935, during a speech at the Republican People's Party's fourth congress, Prime Minister İsmet İnönü was quoted as saying, "We will not remain silent. All citizens who live with us must speak Turkish!"

The campaign went beyond the measures of mere policy of speaking Turkish, to an outright prevention and prohibition of any other language.

=== "Citizen, speak Turkish!" campaign ===
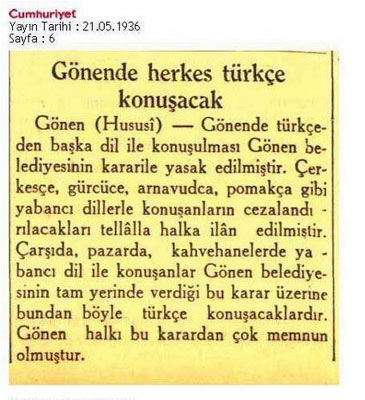
Cumhuriyet newspaper reporting local authorities of the Gönen district of Balıkesir to impose fines against speaking in any language other than Turkish in public, 21 May 1936

On 13 January 1928, the student union at the Darülfünun (Istanbul University) Law School in Istanbul started a campaign with the objective of preventing the use of languages other than Turkish to be used in public. Signs were held by campaign organizers that proclaimed, "We cannot call Turk to those who do not speak Turkish". Some campaigners also chanted, "Speak Turkish or leave the country!".

The campaigners placed posters in the major cities of the country with the slogan "Citizen, speak Turkish!" and the message further spread into the mass media, press, and political circles throughout the country. Signs in theaters, restaurants, hotels, and ferries urged everyone to speak Turkish and many people were harassed in public or criminalized for using a language other than Turkish.

Citizens found to be using a language other than Turkish may sometimes have been charged with violating Article 159 (now defunct) of the Turkish penal code for "insulting Turkishness" as a legal justification.

In the 1960s, the movement saw its revival as posters and signs were placed and hung throughout the country.

=== Government sponsorship ===
Prior to the launch of the "Citizen, speak Turkish!" campaign, many initiatives were already taken by the government of Turkey to make Turkish the sole language of the public. In 1924 during a session of the Turkish National Assembly, a law was proposed to make Turkish a compulsory language and refusing to speak it resulted in a fine. Meanwhile, as the debates in the National Assembly were ongoing, the municipal government of Bursa took the first initiative and began to impose fines to those who spoke a non-Turkish language in public areas. This was followed by the cities of Balıkesir and Bergama in 1927.

After the launch of the "Citizen, speak Turkish!" campaign of 1928, arrests were being made all throughout the country with full support of the government who encouraged provincial governors 'to incorporate Turks with foreign dialects into the Turkish community by making Turkish their mother tongue'. In 1933, in the town of Mersin, British citizens, speaking French, were reportedly attacked in public. It was later reported that hundreds were being arrested for speaking languages other than Turkish in public. In a specific case, a M. Chalfoun and a certain Jewish merchant were arrested for speaking Arabic and French to a merchant in town. The accused were released only after the mayor of Mersin pardoned them after visiting them in prison.

New laws were being promulgated throughout the country. In 1936, the municipal governments of Tekirdağ, Lüleburgaz, and Edirne passed decrees to fine those who spoke non-Turkish languages in public. Soon thereafter, cities and towns such as Diyarbakır, Adana, Ankara, and Kırklareli followed suit.

== Reactions ==
Protests and deliberate usage of languages other than Turkish occurred as, at the time, many minorities had difficulty adjusting to an environment in which they were to exclusively use Turkish in public. Turkish fluency was particularly low in Jewish people, who had Judaeo-Spanish (Ladino) as a native language.

== See also ==
- Racism in Turkey
- Turkification
- Languages of Turkey
- Animal name changes in Turkey
- Geographical name changes in Turkey
- Ivri, daber ivrit (Hebrew, speak Hebrew!)
- If you're Spanish, speak Spanish!
- Vergonha
