= Pirəmsən =

- Municipality
- Location within Azerbaijan
- Coordinates: 41°16′08″N 48°51′23″E
- Country: Azerbaijan
- Rayon: Davachi

Population
  - Total: 908
- Time zone: UTC+4 (AZT)
  - Summer (DST): UTC+5 (AZT)

Pirəmsən (also, Piramsin) is a village and municipality in the Davachi Rayon of Azerbaijan. It has a population of 908. The municipality consists of the villages of Pirəmsən and Ərəblər.
