= Zan languages =

Branch of Kartvelian containing Mingrelian and Laz

Zan
- Geographic distribution: South Caucasus, Anatolia
- Linguistic classification: Kartvelian: Karto-Zan; Zan
- Subdivisions: Mingrelian; Laz; †Dval?

Language codes
- Glottolog: zann1245
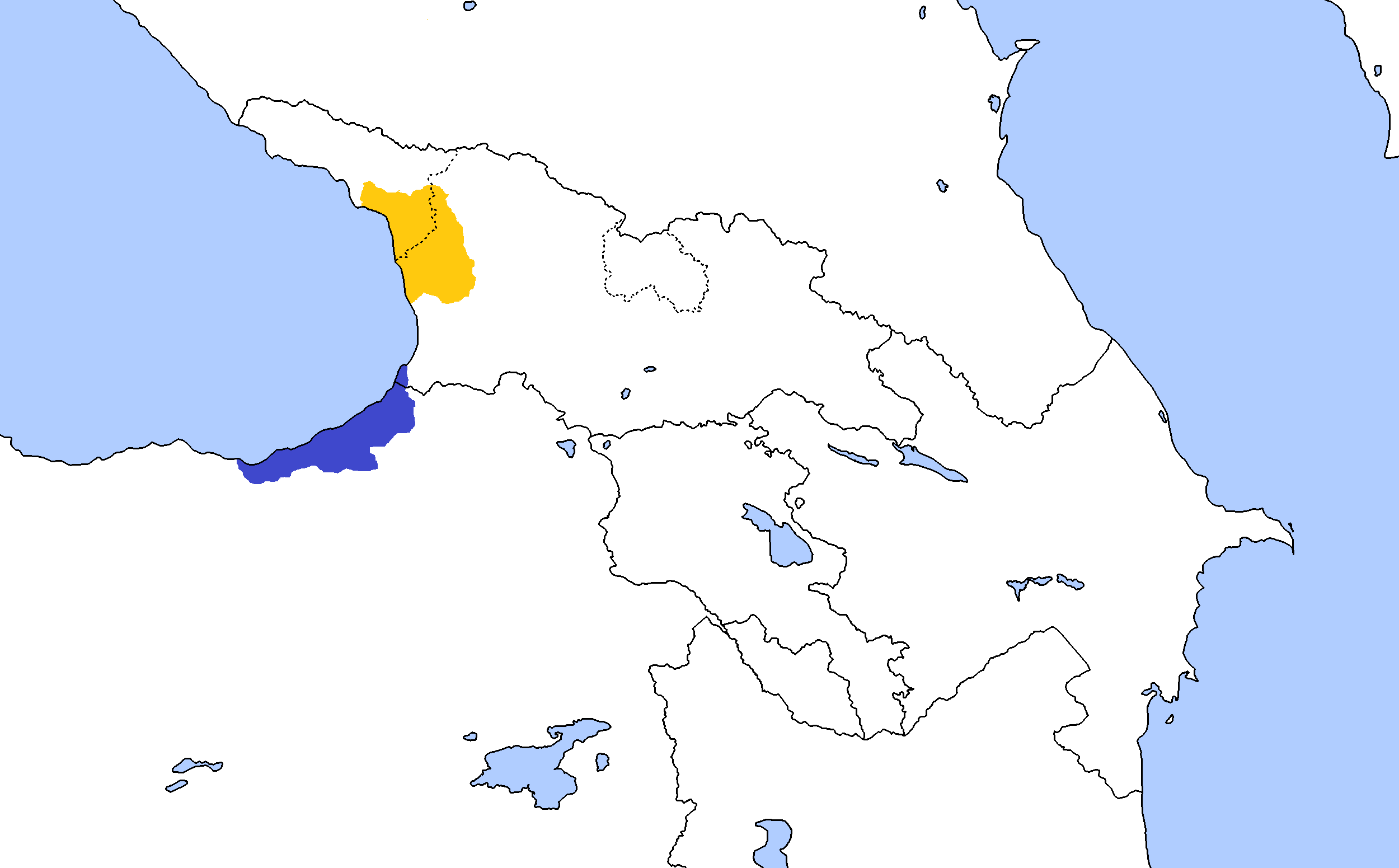

The Zan languages, also known as Zanuri (Georgian: ზანური ენები) or Colchidian, are a branch of the Kartvelian languages comprising the Mingrelian and Laz languages. This classification is disputed, as some Georgian linguists consider the two languages to form a dialect continuum of a single Zan language. This view is often challenged on the basis of mutual intelligibility, one of the most commonly applied criteria for distinguishing languages. Mingrelian and Laz are only partially mutually intelligible, although speakers of either language can recognize a substantial amount of vocabulary in the other. This overlap is attributable primarily to semantic loans, lexical loans, and other areal features resulting from geographical proximity and prolonged historical contact, which are characteristic of dialect continua.

The term Zan derives from the Greco-Roman name of one of the principal Colchian tribes. This name closely resembles the term used by the Svans for the Mingrelians (მჷ-ზა̈ნ mə-zän). The Georgian linguist Akaki Shanidze proposed the name Colchidian for the Zan languages.

== History ==
Proto-Kartvelian
Proto-Georgian-Zan (Proto-Karto-Zan)
Zan
Svan	Mingrelian	Laz	Georgian

Georgian and Zan form the Karto-Zan branch of the Kartvelian languages. Georgian and Zan are estimated to have diverged approximately 2,600 years ago. Zan was spoken by a continuous community along the Black Sea coast, extending from present-day Trabzon, Turkey, into western Georgia, as well as in parts of present-day Giresun and Ordu Province in Turkey.

In the mid-7th century, the migration of Georgian-speaking populations from Iberia (eastern Georgia), prompted by the Arab conquests, contributed to linguistic and cultural changes in western Georgia. The interaction and intermixing of the local Zan-speaking population with Georgian-speaking newcomers contributed to the formation of modern western Georgian ethnographic groups, including the Imeretians, Gurians, and Adjarians. The expansion of Georgian across much of western Georgia was associated with the growing influence of Georgian-speaking political and ecclesiastical institutions. By this period, the Georgian script and a Georgian literary tradition were already established, the Bible had been translated into Georgian, and Georgian was used in Christian worship. Despite the expansion of Georgian, lexical elements of Zan origin have been retained in western Georgian dialects, reflecting the region's historical linguistic contact.

Separated by geographical factors, and later by political and religious differences, northern and southern Zan eventually diverged into Mingrelian and Laz, respectively. As this differentiation was largely complete by the early modern period, the concept of a unified Zan language is no longer commonly used today. Mingrelian is currently spoken by the Mingrelians, primarily in northwestern Georgia, including Mingrelia and Abkhazia, whereas Laz is spoken by the Laz people in Turkey and in a small part of Adjara in southwestern Georgia.

== Sources ==
- Amerijibi-Mullen, Rusudan, ed. (2006). K'olxuri (megrul-lazuri) ena: Colchian (Megrelian-Laz) language. ICGL (Universali: Tbilisi, Georgia), www.icgl.org. (see also Andrew Higgins. "Review of Colchian".)
- Jost Gippert; Irakli Dzocenidze; Svetlana Ahlborn. "The Zan language". Armazi Project: Georgian Academy of Sciences (Chikobava Institute of Linguistics). Archived from the original on 2012-03-01.
