= Ərəbqədim =

- Municipality
- Location within Azerbaijan
- Coordinates: 40°25′47″N 48°58′07″E
- Country: Azerbaijan
- Rayon: Gobustan

Population
  - Total: 1,275
- Time zone: UTC+4 (AZT)
  - Summer (DST): UTC+5 (AZT)

Ərəbqədim (also, Arabkadim and Arabkadym) is a village and municipality in the Gobustan Rayon of Azerbaijan. It has a population of 1,275.
