= Ərəbocağı =

- Municipality
- Location within Azerbaijan
- Coordinates: 40°44′09″N 47°23′55″E
- Country: Azerbaijan
- Rayon: Agdash

Population
  - Total: 891
- Time zone: UTC+4 (AZT)
  - Summer (DST): UTC+5 (AZT)

Ərəbocag (also, Ərəbocaq and Arabodzhagy) is a village and municipality in the Agdash Rayon of Azerbaijan. It has a population of 891.
