= Çöl Ərəb =

- Municipality
- Location within Azerbaijan
- Coordinates: 40°11′N 48°06′E
- Country: Azerbaijan
- Rayon: Kurdamir
- Time zone: UTC+4 (AZT)
  - Summer (DST): UTC+5 (AZT)

Çöl Ərəb (also, Çöl-erəb, Çölərəb, Chël’Arab, and Cholarb) is a village and municipality in the Kurdamir Rayon of Azerbaijan.
