= Proto-Georgian–Zan language =

Reconstructed ancestor of the Karto-Zan languages

Proto-Georgian–Zan
- Proto-Karto-Zan
- Reconstruction of: Karto-Zan languages
- Era: c. 1900 BC - c. 800 BC
- Reconstructed ancestor: Proto-Kartvelian

Proto-Georgian–Zan (also referred to as Proto-Karto-Zan) is a reconstructed language which is the common ancestor of Karto-Zan languages. It is hypothesized to have diverged from Proto-Kartvelian during the 19th century BC and to have split into the ancestor of the Zan languages and the Georgian language around the 8th century BC or 7th century BC.

The phonology of Proto-Georgian–Zan is essentially identical to Proto-Kartvelian in both vowel sounds and consonant sounds, although the lexicon has slightly diverged, as evidenced by the lack of certain words related to metallurgy and agriculture present in Svan.

- Proto-Kartvelian
  - Karto‑Zan
    - Georgian
    - Zan
      - Mingrelian
      - Laz
  - Svan

Family tree of the Kartvelian languages
