= Ərəblər, Davachi =

Ərəblər
- Location within Azerbaijan
- Coordinates: 41°16′42″N 48°51′08″E
- Country: Azerbaijan
- Rayon: Davachi
- Municipality: Pirəmsən
- Time zone: UTC+4 (AZT)
  - Summer (DST): UTC+5 (AZT)

Ərəblər (also, Arablyar) is a village in the Davachi Rayon of Azerbaijan. The village forms part of the municipality of Pirəmsən.
