= Karto-Zan languages =

Branch of Kartvelian containing Georgian and Zan

Karto-Zan
- Georgian–Zan
- Geographic distribution: South Caucasus, Anatolia
- Linguistic classification: Kartvelian: Karto-Zan
- Proto-language: Proto-Georgian–Zan
- Subdivisions: Georgian; Zan

Language codes
- Glottolog: geor1252

The Karto-Zan languages, also known as Georgian–Zan, constitute a branch of the Kartvelian language family comprising the Georgian and Zan languages. The Svan language constitutes the other major branch of the family and exhibits characteristic differences from the Karto-Zan group.

The divergence of Svan from Proto-Kartvelian has been hypothesized to date as far back as the 19th century BC. Georgian and Zan, in turn, are thought to have diverged from Proto-Georgian–Zan during the 7th century BC. Georgian and Zan share archaic vocabulary related to metallurgy and agriculture that is absent from Svan.

== Classification ==
- Proto-Kartvelian
  - Karto‑Zan
    - Georgian
    - Zan
      - Mingrelian
      - Laz
  - Svan

Family tree of the Kartvelian languages

The Karto-Zan languages constitute a branch of the Kartvelian language family. Glottolog divides the Karto-Zan group into two subgroups: the Georgic languages, comprising Georgian, its dialects, and Old Georgian; and the Zan languages, comprising Mingrelian and Laz.
