= Proto-Kartvelian language =

Reconstructed ancestor of the Kartvelian languages

Proto-Kartvelian
- Reconstruction of: Kartvelian languages
- Era: Until c. 2000 BC
- Lower-order reconstructions: Proto-Georgian-Zan

The Proto-Kartvelian language, or Common Kartvelian (Georgian: წინარექართველური ენა, romanized: ts'inarekartveluri ena, Georgian: პროტოქართველური ენა, romanized: p'rot'okartveluri ena), is the linguistic reconstruction of the common ancestor of the Kartvelian languages, which was spoken by the ancestors of the modern Kartvelian peoples. The existence of such a language is widely accepted by specialists in linguistics, who have reconstructed a broad outline of the language by comparing the existing Kartvelian languages against each other. Several linguists, namely Gerhard Deeters and Georgy Klimov have also reconstructed a lower-level proto-language called Proto-Karto-Zan or Proto-Georgian-Zan, which is the ancestor of Karto-Zan languages (includes Georgian and Zan).

== Dating ==
The split of Proto-Kartvelian into Svan and Proto-Georgian-Zan is usually estimated to have occurred around 2000 BC. However, a 2023 study using Bayesian linguistic phylogenetics found a mean split date of 7641 BP (5691 BC), in the Early Copper Age.

== Influences ==
The ablaut patterns of Proto-Kartvelian are highly similar to those of the Indo-European languages, and so it is thought that Proto-Kartvelian interacted with Indo-European at a relatively early date. This is reinforced by cognates with Indo-European, such as the Proto-Kartvelian *mḳerd- ('breast'), and its possible relation to the Proto-Indo-European *ḱerd- ('heart'). Proto-Kartvelian *ṭep- (warm) may also be related to Proto-Indo-European *tep- 'warm'.

== Relation to descendants ==
The modern descendants of Proto-Kartvelian are Georgian, Svan, Mingrelian and Laz. These form two primary branches, with Svan constituting one primary branch and Karto-Zan forming the other. This latter is further subdivided into Georgian on one hand and the Zan languages (Mingrelian and Laz) on the other. The ablaut patterns of Proto-Kartvelian were better preserved in Georgian and (particularly) Svan than in either Mingrelian or Laz, in which new forms have been set up so that there is a single, stable vowel in each word element.

The system of pronouns of Proto-Kartvelian is distinct on account of its category of inclusive–exclusive (so, for instance, there were two forms of the pronoun "we": one that includes the listener and one that does not). This has survived in Svan but not in the other languages. Svan also includes a number of archaisms from the Proto-Kartvelian era, and therefore it is thought that Svan broke off from Proto-Kartvelian at a relatively early stage: the later Proto-Kartvelian stage (called Karto-Zan) split into Georgian and Zan (Mingrelo-Laz).

== Phonology ==
=== Vowels ===
Proto-Kartvelian vowels
	Front		Back			
	Front		unrounded		rounded	
	short	long	short	long	short	long
Close	(*i [i])				(*u [u])	
Open-mid	*e [ɛ]	*ē [ɛː]			*o [ɔ]	*ō [ɔː]
Open			*a [ɑ]	*ā [ɑː]		

=== Consonants ===
Proto-Kartvelian consonants
		Labial	Alveolar		Retroflex	Postalveolar		Velar	Uvular	Glottal
		Labial	plain	sibilant	Retroflex	central	lateral	Velar	Uvular	Glottal
Nasal		*m [m]	*n [n]							
Plosive	voiced	*b [b]	*d [d]	*ʒ [d͡z]	*ʒ₁ [d͡ʐ]	*ǯ [d͡ʒ]		*g [ɡ]		
Plosive	voiceless	*p [p]	*t [t]	*c [t͡s]	*c₁ [t͡ʂ]	*č [t͡ʃ]		*k [k]	*q [q]	
Plosive	ejective	*ṗ [pʼ]	*ṭ [tʼ]	*c̣ [t͡sʼ]	*c̣₁ [t͡ʂʼ]	*č̣ [t͡ʃʼ]	*ɬʼ [t͡ɬʼ]	*ḳ [kʼ]	*q̇ [qʼ]	
Fricative	voiceless			*s [s]	*s₁ [ʂ]	*š [ʃ]	*lʿ [ɬ]	*x [x]		*h [h]
Fricative	voiced			*z [z]	*z₁ [ʐ]	*ž [ʒ]		*ɣ [ɣ]		
Trill						*r [r]				
Approximant		*w [w]	*l [l]			*y [j]				

Distinction between plain [q] and ejective [qʼ] remains only in Svan language. This distinction also existed in Old Georgian.
