= Ərəblər, Barda =

Ərəblər
- Municipality
- Location within Azerbaijan Location within Karabakh Economic Region
- Coordinates: 40°26′25″N 47°09′50″E
- Country: Azerbaijan
- Rayon: Barda

Population
  - Total: 310
- Time zone: UTC+4 (AZT)
  - Summer (DST): UTC+5 (AZT)

Ərəblər (also, Arablyar) is a village and municipality in the Barda Rayon of Azerbaijan. It has a population of 310.
