= Herod's Palace (Herodium) =

Archaeological site in Judea, Israel

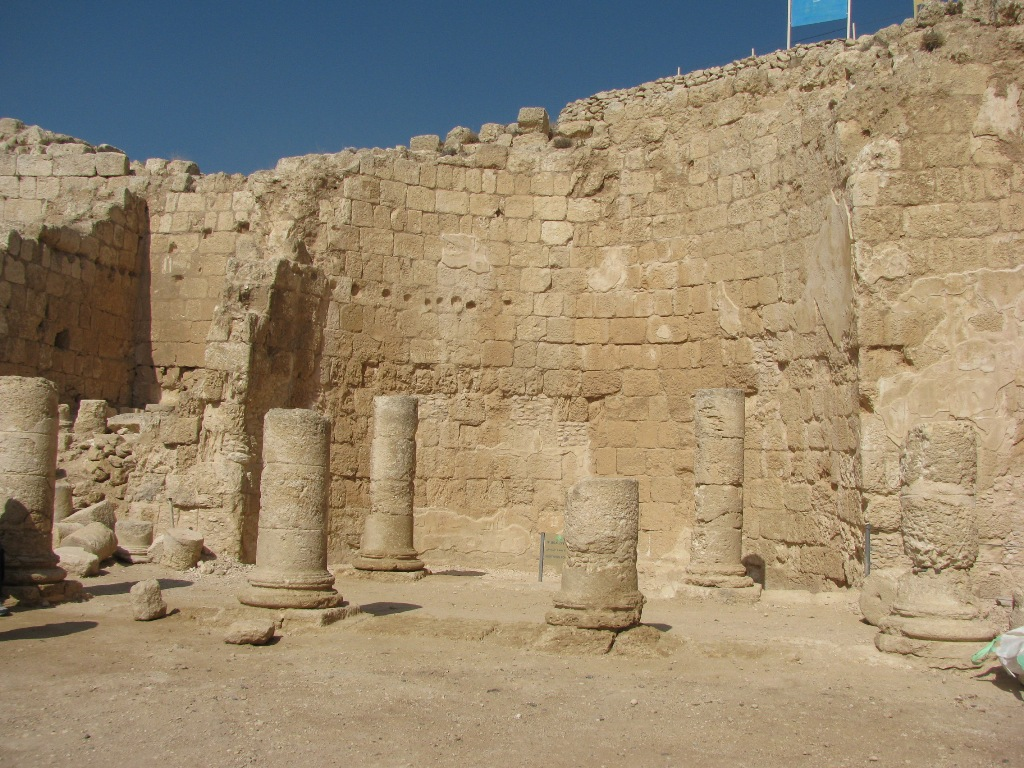
- Lobby of Herod's northern palace

- Location within State of Palestine

General information
- Type: Palace
- Location: Herodium, West Bank, Palestine
- Coordinates: 31°39′57″N 35°14′29″E
- Opened: 23-15 BCE
- Owner: Herod the Great

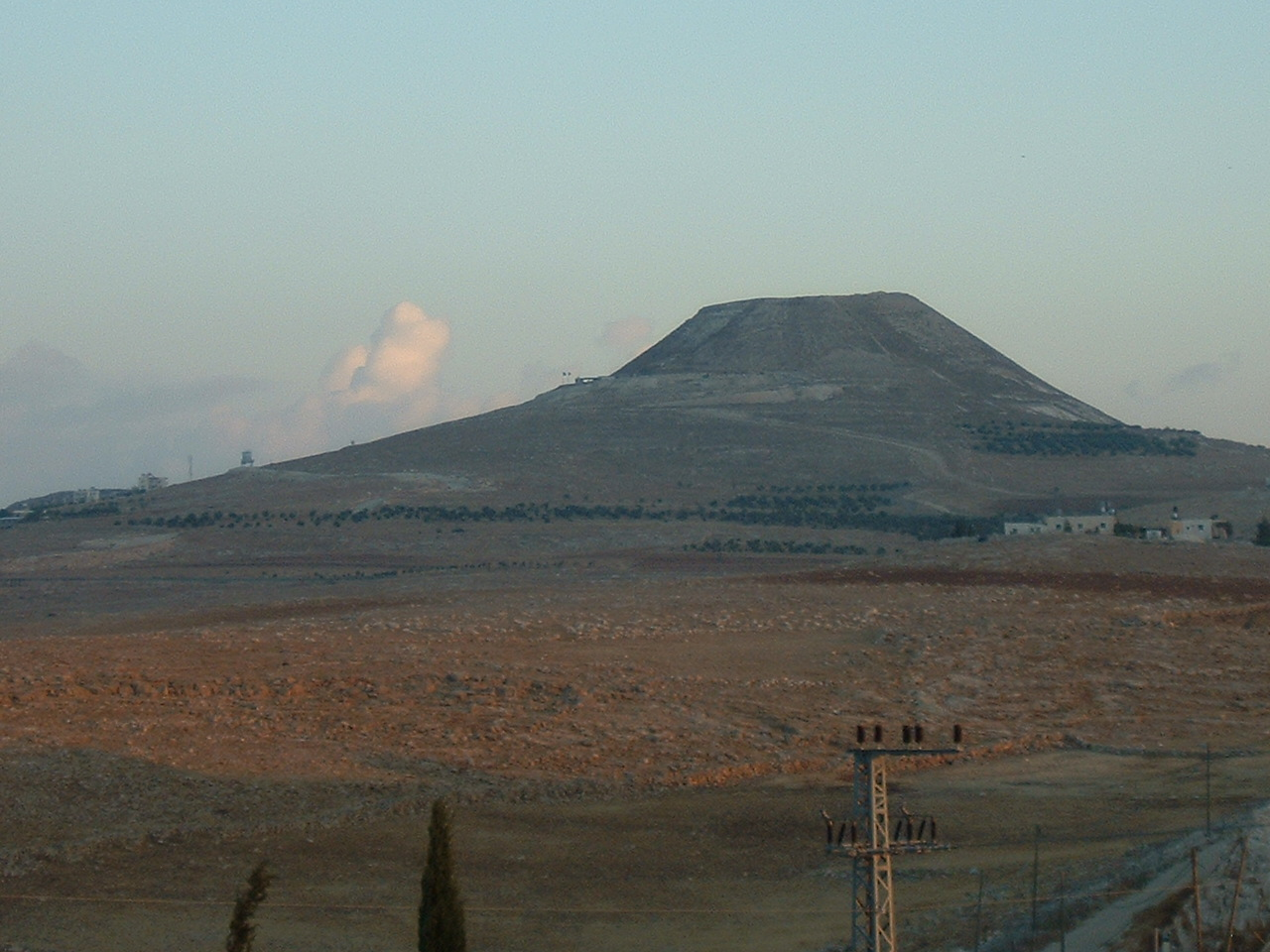
2005 -הר ההרודיון

Herod's Palace (Hebrew הרודיון or הר הורדוס) is an archaeological site within the fortress of Herodium, West Bank. The Upper Herodium where it is located was the first of Herod's palace-fortresses.

== Historical framework ==
Herodium is a palace/fortress constructed by Herod the Great, king of Judaea (c. 72 – c. 4 BCE). Herodium was built by Herod as a mausoleum for himself. Ehud Netzer claimed to have positively discovered the burial place of Herod at the site, however, as this and large parts of Herodium generally had been ransacked both in antiquity and later, this was contested by other archeologists. Josephus describes the building of Herodium as follows: "Having constructed monuments to his family members, Herod turned to his own commemoration […….] he built a breast-shaped mound at a distance of 60 ris from Jerusalem, and named it thus [Herodium], decorating it even more splendidly. The hill-top was surrounded by circular towers, within whose circumference he built a very lavish palace......" He further describes Herod's end as follows: "the body was carried for two hundred furlongs, to Herodium, where he had wanted to be buried. That is how the Herod saga came to an end."

During the Bar Kokhva (בר כוכבא) revolt 132-135/6 CE, Jewish rebels used the site as an important base in their war efforts against the Romans.

During the Byzantine period (4th-7th centuries) a village with three churches was built on the ruins of some of the lower parts of the site.

== Construction ==
Herodium was built on a preexisting mountain, some 17 km. south of the Old City of Jerusalem and some 6 km. from the center of Bethlehem. The site is easily visible from both cities, even today and is a part of several fortresses and palaces Herod built in Judaea. It has been argued that Herodium, the palace in Jericho and Masada were possible escape options in different directions for the unpopular king.

Archaeologists believe that the palace was built by slaves, paid workers (contractors), and architects. Herod was considered one of the greatest builders of his time, and geography did not daunt him—his palace was built on the edge of the desert and was situated atop an artificial hill. The largest of the four towers was built on a stone base 18 meters in diameter. This was most likely where Herod lived; he decorated his rooms with mosaic floors and elaborate frescoes. The other three towers, which consisted of living spaces and storage, were 16 meters in diameter. Outside, several cisterns were built to collect water that was channeled into the palace.

== Excavation ==
The American explorer, Edward Robinson, mentioned the site in 1838 and some 40 years later the German Conrad Schick described and depicted the site in detail. However, archaeological excavation of Herodium was begun in 1962 by Virgilio Canio Corbo and Stanislao Loffreda, from the Studium Biblicum Franciscanum of Jerusalem, and it continued until 1967: they discovered the upper citadel, at the top of the hill.

From 1972 onward, intermittent excavations were carried out by Ehud Netzer, working on behalf of the Hebrew University of Jerusalem. In 2007, he found and identified the long sought-after tomb of King Herod on the northern slope of the hill. Netzer excavated mostly the lower palace, at the base of the hill; he fell to his death at the site in 2010.

Many archaeologists suspect that mosaic floors and frescoes were common throughout the palace, but it will take more work to reveal them because of the thousands of years that have passed since its construction.

== Excavated areas ==
Bathhouse

The Roman bathhouse consisted, as customary, of three areas, the caldarium, the tepidarium, and the frigidarium. It also had a very impressive dome which is still in good condition today despite thousands of years of earthquakes and wars. The caldarium had vaulted ceilings, raised floors under which fire was tended to, with channels in the walls to heat up the water. The tepidarium had mosaic floors and frescoes just like the living quarters of the palace. The frigidarium, the last stop in the bathhouse, was where guests would cool off in a large pool. The water came to this desert location from extensive waterworks running from Solomon's Pools, south of Hebron, to the temple in Jerusalem, partly by aqueducts.

Roman Theatre

Netzer discovered the Roman Theatre just before his death in late 2010. A loggia, or a theatre box, was discovered. This means that when Herod or other notable officials went to see a play, on the background of the desert and Jerusalem in the distance, they would receive luxury treatment. The rest of the audience would be seated below on benches that could accommodate about 650 people. What is quite unique about this find is that frescoes of landscapes were discovered. This suggests that the painters were well traveled; they depict scenes of Italy and even the Nile River in Egypt. It is also assumed that the painters were on loan to Herod from Caesar in Rome.

== See also ==
- Herodian architecture
