= Ehud Netzer =

Israeli archaeologist

- אהוד נצר
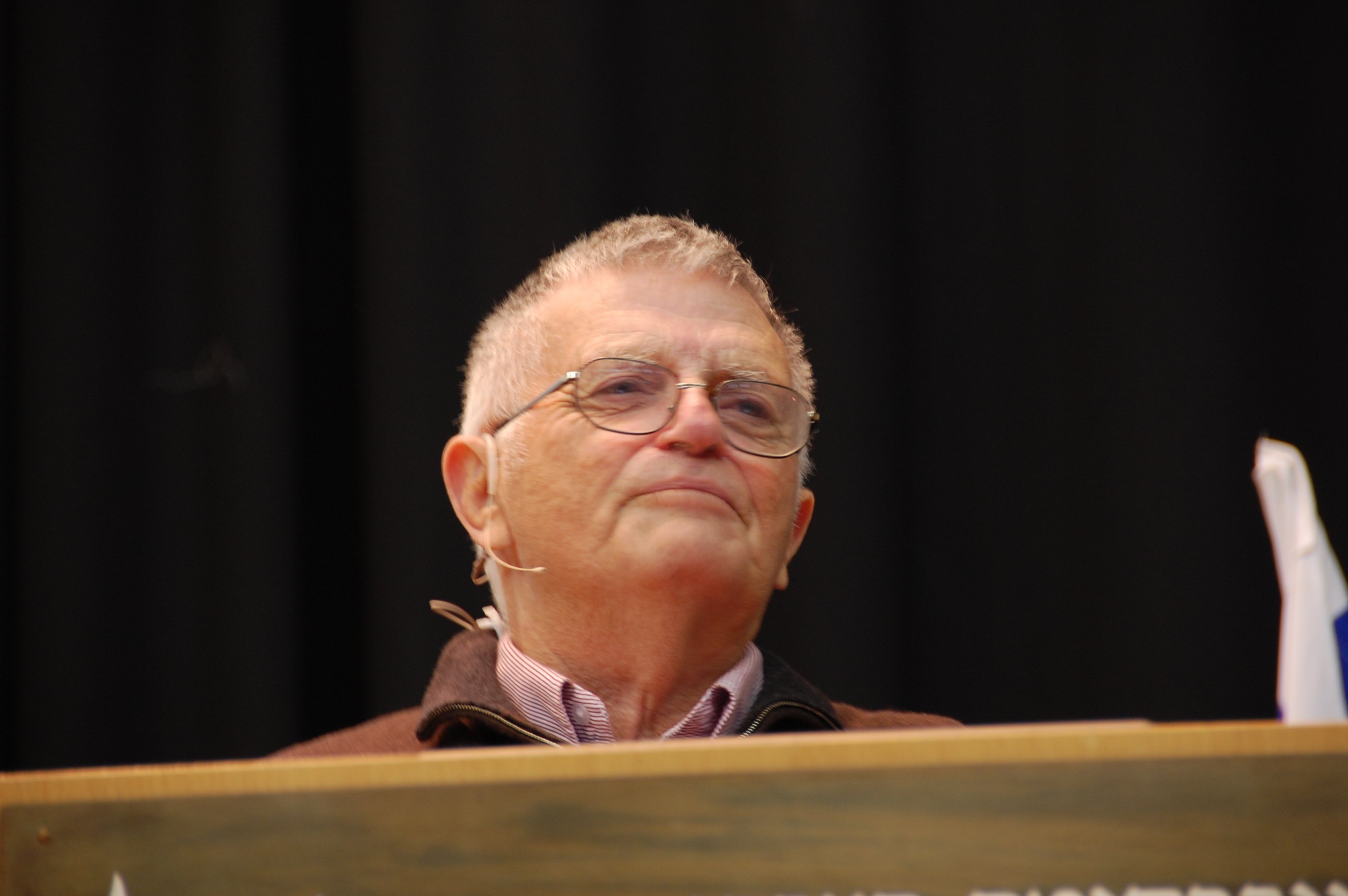
- Born: 13 May 1934; Jerusalem
- Died: 28 October 2010 (aged 76); Jerusalem
- Occupations: Architect, archaeologist and educator

Ehud Netzer (Hebrew: אהוד נצר; 13 May 1934 – 28 October 2010) was an Israeli architect, archaeologist and educator, known for his extensive excavations at Herodium, where in 2007 he found and identified the tomb of Herod the Great; and the discovery of a structure defined by Netzer as a synagogue, which, if true would be the oldest one ever found (the "Wadi Qelt Synagogue").

Netzer served as a professor at the Institute of Archaeology at the Hebrew University in Jerusalem. He was a world-renowned expert on Herodian architecture. Netzer worked at Masada with Yigael Yadin, and later completed the official excavation report for the site. He later led teams of archaeologists like Rachel Chachy, who did important fieldwork at the Herodian palace at Jericho. At Herodium, in the desert near Bethlehem and south of Jerusalem, for more than three decades, Netzer oversaw extensive excavations focusing on remains at the foot and on the sides of the partially artificial mountain.

== Biography ==
Ehud Netzer was born in Jerusalem in 1934 to Israeli educators Joseph and Puah Menczel. Netzer was reported to have changed his surname from Menczel to Netzer because of the complexity and recurring mistakes in spelling his name in the Hebrew language as well as in English. He graduated with a degree in architecture from the Technion in 1958. As an undergraduate, Netzer would spend his summer vacation in excavations of the noted archaeologist Yigael Yadin.

While working as a co-architect in excavations in Masada, Netzer met his future wife, Devorah Dove, an archeology student. He later obtained a Ph.D. in the field of archaeology from Hebrew University of Jerusalem.

He became a professor at the Institute of Archaeology at Hebrew University. Netzer was eventually recognized as the world's foremost authority on Herodian architecture.

== Archaeological and architectural career ==
Netzer initiated and directed excavations at several building projects of Herod the Great, the ancient king of Judea. In the mid-1960s, Netzer was co-architect, together with I. Dunayevsky, of the excavations at Masada, directed by Professor Yigael Yadin. After Yadin's death, Netzer completed the final excavation report The Buildings, Stratigraphy and Architecture of Masada. Later, Netzer directed the restoration of the Masada site on behalf of Israel's National Parks Authority.

Netzer was head architect for the restoration and excavation of the Jewish Quarter in Jerusalem (1967-1975); the planner of the restoration of the Jewish neighborhoods in Jerusalem, Mishkenot Sha'ananim, and Yemin Moshe; and planned public buildings in Egypt.

In 1968, Netzer initiated and directed large-scale excavations at the site of Herod's winter palace at Jericho.

In 1972, he began excavating at the huge palace complex of Herodium, located in the desert outside Bethlehem. His first phase of work continued to 1987, as he excavated palace structures. He returned to the dig from 1997–2000, and again from 2000–2010. The ancient Jewish historian, Josephus Flavius, had written that Herod's tomb was located at his fortified palace of Herodium.

From 1972-78, Netzer completed his Ph.D. dissertation at the Hebrew University's Institute of Archaeology on the subject of Herod's palaces at Herodium and Jericho. He became a senior lecturer at the university in 1981 and a professor in 1990. The subjects he taught combined architecture and archaeology. From 1985-93, he directed the Hebrew University expedition to Zippori (Sepphoris) in the lower Galilee, which exposed a synagogue. Its mosaic floor has been exhibited in the Jewish Museum in New York City.

=== Herodium ===
Herodium is an enormous, cone-shaped, partially man-made mountain holding a fortress palace built by Herod just outside Bethlehem. According to the ancient Romano-Jewish historian Josephus, Herodium was the site of Herod's burial. Enclosed within the artificial hill was a fortress palace, which had previously been the focus of excavations led in 1962-67 by Virgilio Canio Corbo and Stanislao Loffreda from the Studium Biblicum Franciscanum of Jerusalem. Netzer began work on the extensive palace complex at the foot of the hill, which he labeled as "Lower Herodium".

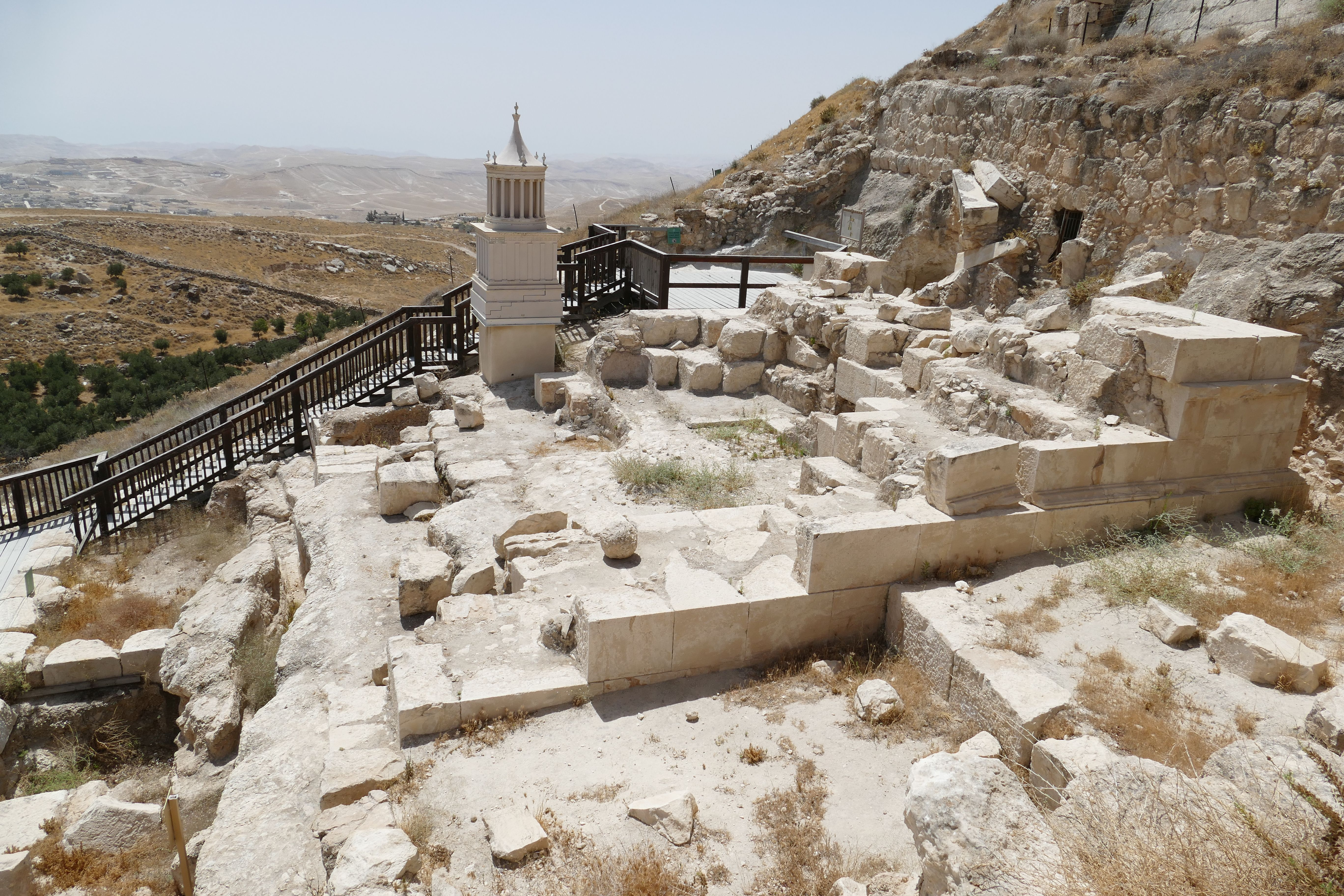
View of lower part of Herodium with restored tower

From 1972–87, Netzer worked at Herodium, excavating the palace structures. He resumed work on the dig from 1997–2000, and again from 2000–2010. Beginning in 2006, excavations revealed a ramp winding around the hill from the lower palace complex and stadium. Along its path were discovered a theater and a 6.5 meter wide monumental staircase, which led past a platform and remains which, in May 2007, Netzer identified as the probable tomb of King Herod,although the tomb and its content had been demolished. The identification was based on the magnificence of the room itself, other articles found there and the remains of a sarcophagus, plausibly Herod's. Netzer found the sarcophagus "shattered into hundreds of pieces", as described by Josephus, who wrote that it was done "by Jewish dissidents during the first revolt against the Romans between AD 66 and 72."

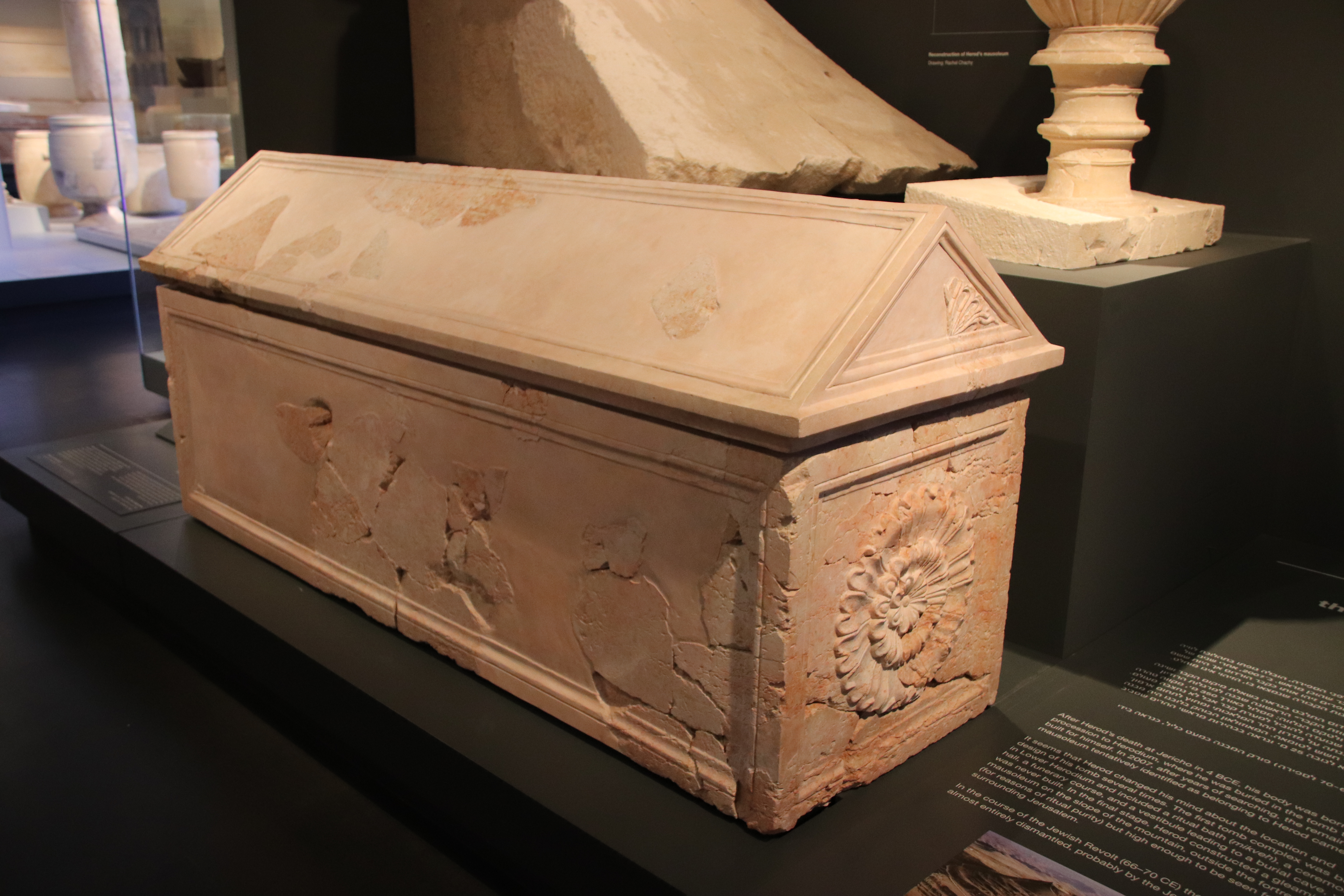
Restorated sarcophagus of Herod the Great, Israel Museum

In October 2013, archaeologists Joseph Patrich and Benjamin Arubas challenged the identification of the tomb as that of Herod. According to Patrich and Arubas, the tomb is too modest to be Herod's and has several unlikely features. Roi Porat, who replaced Netzer as excavation leader after the latter's death, stood by the identification, an opinion which by now has become generally accepted.

=== Jericho ===
Netzer excavated at Jericho from 1973, and continued working there over the next decade. At the oasis of Jericho, he uncovered new wings of Herod's winter palace, as well as a Hasmonean winter palace containing a number of swimming pools and gardens. This is the major archaeological site to have survived from that period in Jewish history. The complex includes a structure built 70-50 BCE and identified in 1998 by Netzer as a synagogue, which has been contested, but if proven true would be the oldest synagogue that has ever been found (the "Wadi Qelt synagogue").

== Personal life and death ==
He married Devora and they had four children, all of whom live in Israel: Chana, Ruti, Yael and Yossef.

On 25 October 2010, Netzer fell and was seriously injured when a railing gave way at the dig at Herodium. He died of his injuries three days later at Hadassah Ein Kerem hospital in Jerusalem.

Between February 2013 and January 2014, the Israel Museum hosted the exhibition Herod the Great: The King’s Final Journey in memory of Netzer.

== Published works ==
- The architecture of Herod, the great builder, Mohr Siebeck, Tübingen 2006 (Texts and studies in ancient Judaism, Bd. 117) ISBN 3-16-148570-X
- The Hebrew University excavations at Sepphoris during the years 1992-1996. Qadmoniot. No. 113, pp 2–21, 1997
- "Architectural development of Sepphoris during the Roman and Byzantine Periods", in: Archaeology and the Galilee: Texts and Contexts. pp. 117–130, 1997
- Promise and Redemption: A Synagogue Mosaic from Sepphoris, Jerusalem: Israel Museum, 44 pp., 1996
- "New evidence for Late Roman and Byzantine Sepphoris", in: The Roman and Byzantine Near East: Recent Archaeological. 1995, pp 162–176
- Zippori, Jerusalem: Israel Exploration Society, 71 pp., 1994
- "Byzantine mosaics at Sepphoris: New finds", Israel Museum Journal. No. 10, pp 75–80, 1992
- The Palaces of the Hasmoneans and Herod the Great. Yad Ben-Zvi. 2001. ISBN 978-965-217-187-0.
- The Architecture of Herod, the Great Builder. Baker Academic. 2008. ISBN 978-0-8010-3612-5.
