= Herodium =

Archaeological site in the West Bank

- הרודיון (Hebrew) جبل فريديس (Arabic)
- Herodeion, Herodion
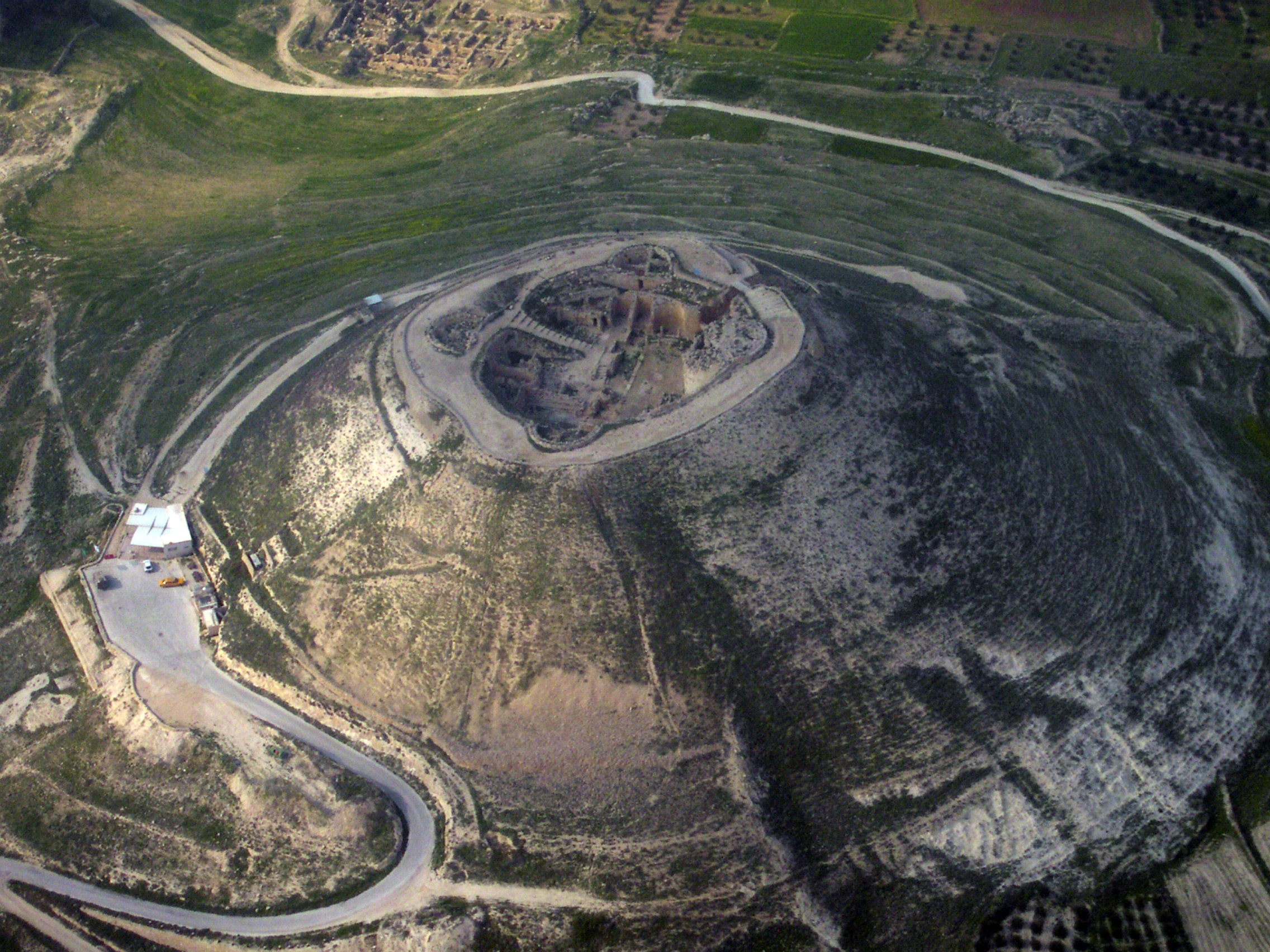
- Aerial view of the acropolis of Herodium
- Interactive map of Herodium
- 31°39′57″N 35°14′29″E
- Type: Fortification
- Periods: Second Temple period, Roman period
- Location: West Bank, Palestine
- Region: Bethlehem Governorate

History
- Built: 22–15 BCE
- Built by: Herod the Great
- Abandoned: 71 CE and 134/5 CE

Site notes
- Height: 758 m (2,487 ft)
- Archaeologists: Virgilio Canio Corbo, Stanislao Loffreda, Ehud Netzer, Roi Porat
- Management: Israel Nature and Parks Authority

The Herodeion (Ancient Greek: Ἡρώδειον), in Latin: Herodium, in Modern Hebrew: הרודיון Herodion, known in Arabic as Jabal al-Fureidis (Arabic: جبل فريديس, lit. '"Mountain of the Little Paradise"') is a fortified desert palace built by Herod the Great, king of Judaea, in the first century BCE. The complex stands atop a hill in the Judaean Desert, approximately 12 kilometres (7.5 mi) south of Jerusalem and 5 kilometres (3.1 mi) southeast of Bethlehem, between Beit Ta'mir, Za'atara to the east and Jannatah, Tekoa and Nokdim to the west. The site is located at an elevation of 758 meters (2,487 ft) above sea level.

Herodium was originally built by Herod to commemorate his victory in 40 BCE over the Hasmonean ruler Antigonus II Mattathias during their struggle for control of Judaea. The site stands atop an artificial, cone-shaped hill that dominates the surrounding landscape and can be seen from Jerusalem. At its summit, Herod's engineers built a fortified palace with double walls, towers, a Roman-style bathhouse, banquet halls, and residential quarters. At the base, a lower palace complex was built complete with gardens, courtyards, and a large pool fed by aqueducts. According to the historian Josephus, Herod was buried at the site following his death in 4 BCE.

Herodium remained active during the Jewish–Roman wars. Jewish rebels occupied the site during the First Jewish–Roman War (66–73 CE), repurposing the dining hall into a synagogue before it was captured by the Romans in 71 CE. The fort was again used as a rebel base during the Bar Kokhba revolt (132–135 CE), after which it was abandoned. From 1972 onward, intermittent excavations were carried out by Prof. Ehud Netzer, working on behalf of the Hebrew University of Jerusalem. In 2007, he found and identified the long sought-after tomb of King Herod on the northern slope of the hill. Netzer excavated mostly the lower palace, at the base of the hill; he fell to his death at the site in 2010.

The site is in Area C of the West Bank, formally under the jurisdiction of the Israeli Civil Administration, a body of military officers, and in practice it is administered jointly with the Israel Nature and Parks Authority. Israel asserts that it is entitled to work in the area under the Oslo Accords, but the Palestinian authorities say Israel has no right to undertake digs there or remove artifacts that Israel discovered in excavations there.

== Etymology ==
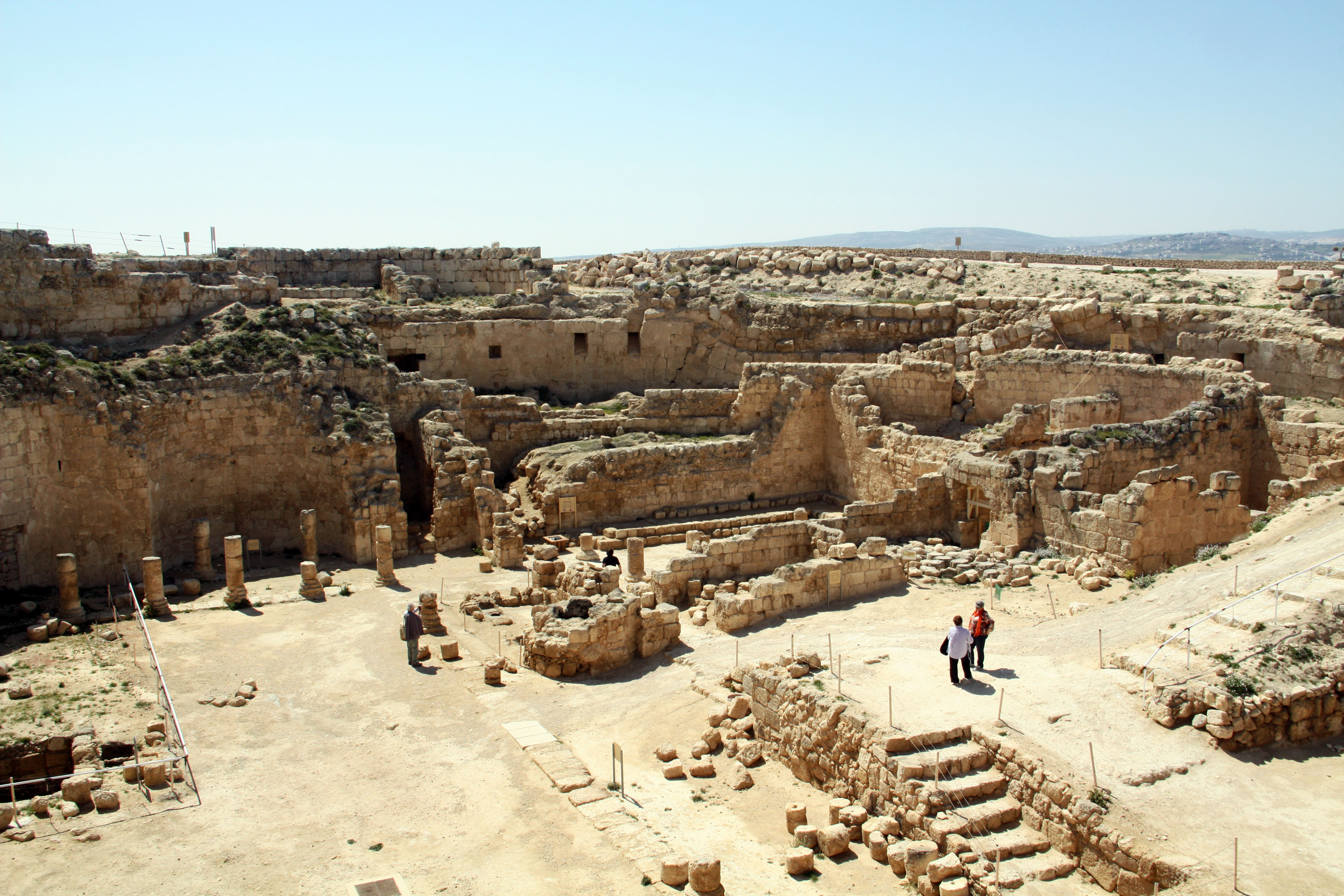
Upper Herodium, looking south. The columns to the left near the wall belong to the peristyle hall.

Herodium is the only site that is named after King Herod the Great. It was known by the Crusaders as the "Mountain of Franks". Palestinian locals historically called it Jabal al-Firdous or Jabal al-Fureidis (Arabic: جبل فريديس, lit. "Mountain of the Little Paradise"); Edward Robinson in 1838 described it as "Frank Mountain", in reference to the Crusaders.

In 1841, Edward Robinson identified the site in Biblical Researches in Palestine as Herodium based on the description found in Josephus. Josephus described a palace fortress and a small town, named after Herod the Great, built between 23 and 15 BCE. A sarcophagus discovered in 2007 was claimed to belong to Herod as it was more ornate than others found in the area.

The modern English name is a transliteration of the Greek spelling (Ancient Greek: Ἡρώδειον). This is followed by the Modern Arabic (Arabic: هيروديون) and the Modern Hebrew (Herodion Hebrew: הרודיון). The name Herodis (Hebrew: הרודיס) was found in the 1960s inscribed in one of the Bar Kokhba letters recovered from the Muraba’at Caves in the Judaean desert, and is thought to represent the original Hebrew name for the site.

== History ==
=== Construction ===
In 40 BCE, after the Parthian conquest of Syria, Herod fled to Masada. On the way, at the location of Herodion, Herod clashed with Jews loyal to his enemy Antigonus, and emerged victorious. According to the Roman Jewish historian Josephus, he "built a town on that spot in commemoration of his victory, and enhanced it with wonderful palaces... and he called it Herodion after himself".

Josephus describes Herodium as follows:

This fortress, which is some sixty stadia distant from Jerusalem, is naturally strong and very suitable for such a structure, for reasonably nearby is a hill, raised to a (greater) height by the hand of man and rounded off in the shape of a breast. At intervals it has round towers, and it has a steep ascent formed of two hundred steps of hewn stone. Within it are costly royal apartments made for security and for ornament at the same time. At the base of the hill there are pleasure grounds built in such a way as to be worth seeing, among other things because of the way in which water, which is lacking in that place, is brought in from a distance and at great expense. The surrounding plain was built up as a city second to none, with the hill serving as an acropolis for the other dwellings.

Archaeologists believe that the palace was designed by architects and built by slaves and paid workers (contractors). Herod was considered one of the greatest builders of his time and was not daunted by geography—his palace was built on the edge of the desert and was situated atop an artificial hill. The largest of the four towers was built on a stone base 18 meters in diameter. This was most likely where Herod lived; he decorated his rooms with mosaic floors and elaborate frescoes. The other three towers, which consisted of living spaces and storage, were 16 meters in diameter. Outside, several cisterns were built to collect water that was channeled into the palace.

The city of Herodium served as a capital of a toparchy.

=== Great Jewish Revolt ===
During the First Jewish–Roman War (66–73 CE), Herodium was held by Jewish rebels. At some point during the revolt, the fort's defenders transformed Herod's triclinium into a synagogue. In 68 CE, rebel leader Simon bar Giora, then operating from nearby Teqoa, attempted to seize Herodium. He sent an emissary, Eleazar, to persuade the garrison to surrender, but the defenders uncovered the plot and expelled him. Eleazar then threw himself from the fortress ramparts.

After the fall of Jerusalem in 70 CE, Herodium remained one of three major fortresses (alongside Machaerus and Masada) still under rebel control, though the specific faction holding it is uncertain. By this time, the site appears to have been defended by a relatively small force, likely joined by refugees fleeing Jerusalem. Herodium was ultimately captured, likely in early 72 CE, by the Roman legate Sextus Lucilius Bassus. The fortress seems to have fallen rapidly, as Josephus provides only a brief mention of its surrender.

=== Bar Kokhba revolt ===
At the beginning of the Bar Kokhba revolt sixty years later, Simon bar Kokhba declared Herodium as his secondary headquarters. The fortress was commanded by Yeshua ben Galgula, who was likely in Bar Kokhba's second or third line of command. Archaeological evidence for the revolt was found all over the site, from the outside buildings to the water system under the mountain. Inside the water system, supporting walls built by the rebels were discovered, and another system of caves was found. Inside one of the caves, burned wood was found which was dated to the time of the revolt.

As in other parts of Judea during the final stages of the Bar Kokhba revolt, the rebels active in Herodium likely sought shelter in nearby refuge caves, including the cave of El Matzia.

== Excavation history ==
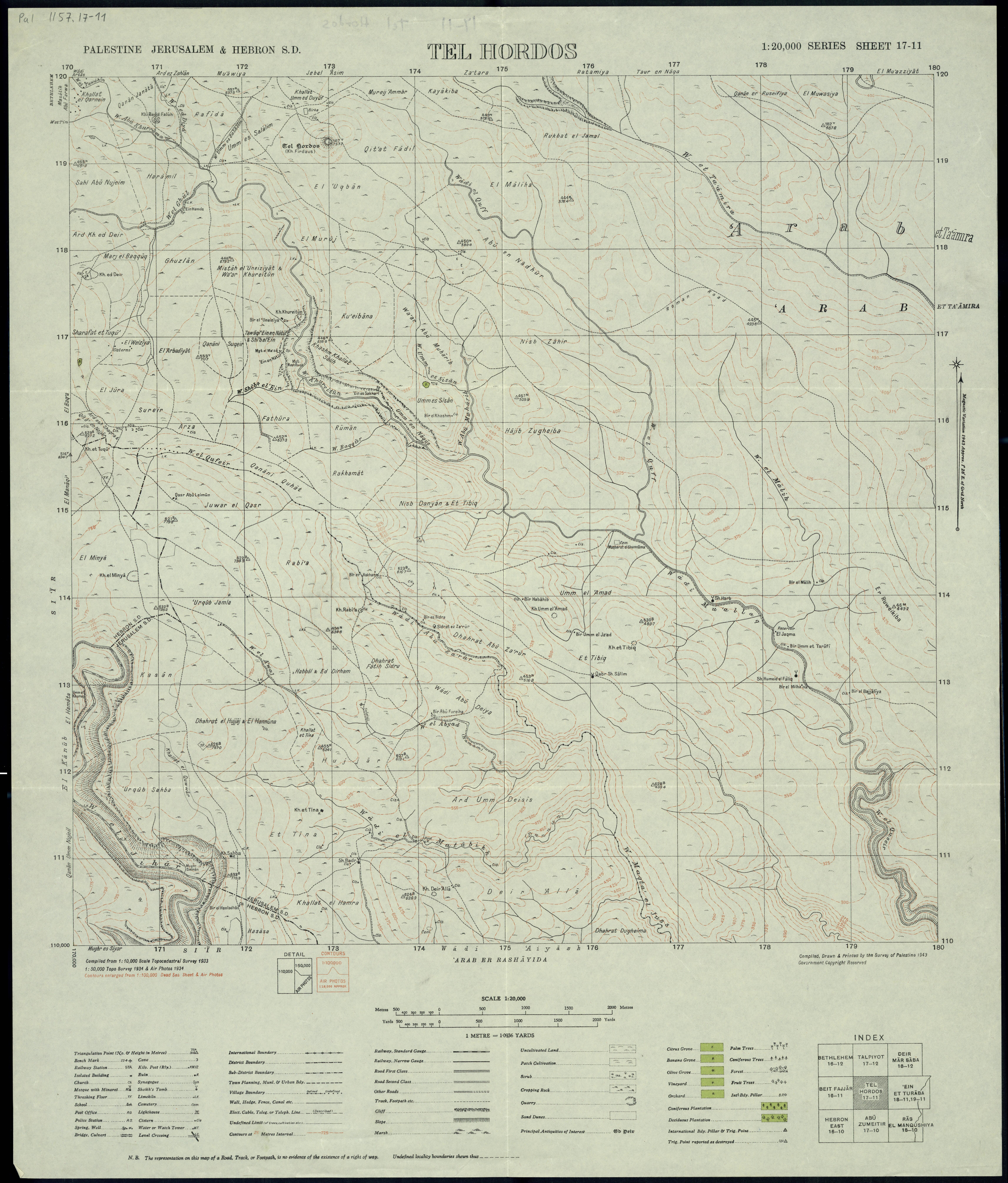
"Tel Hordos" area in 1943, in the Survey of Palestine

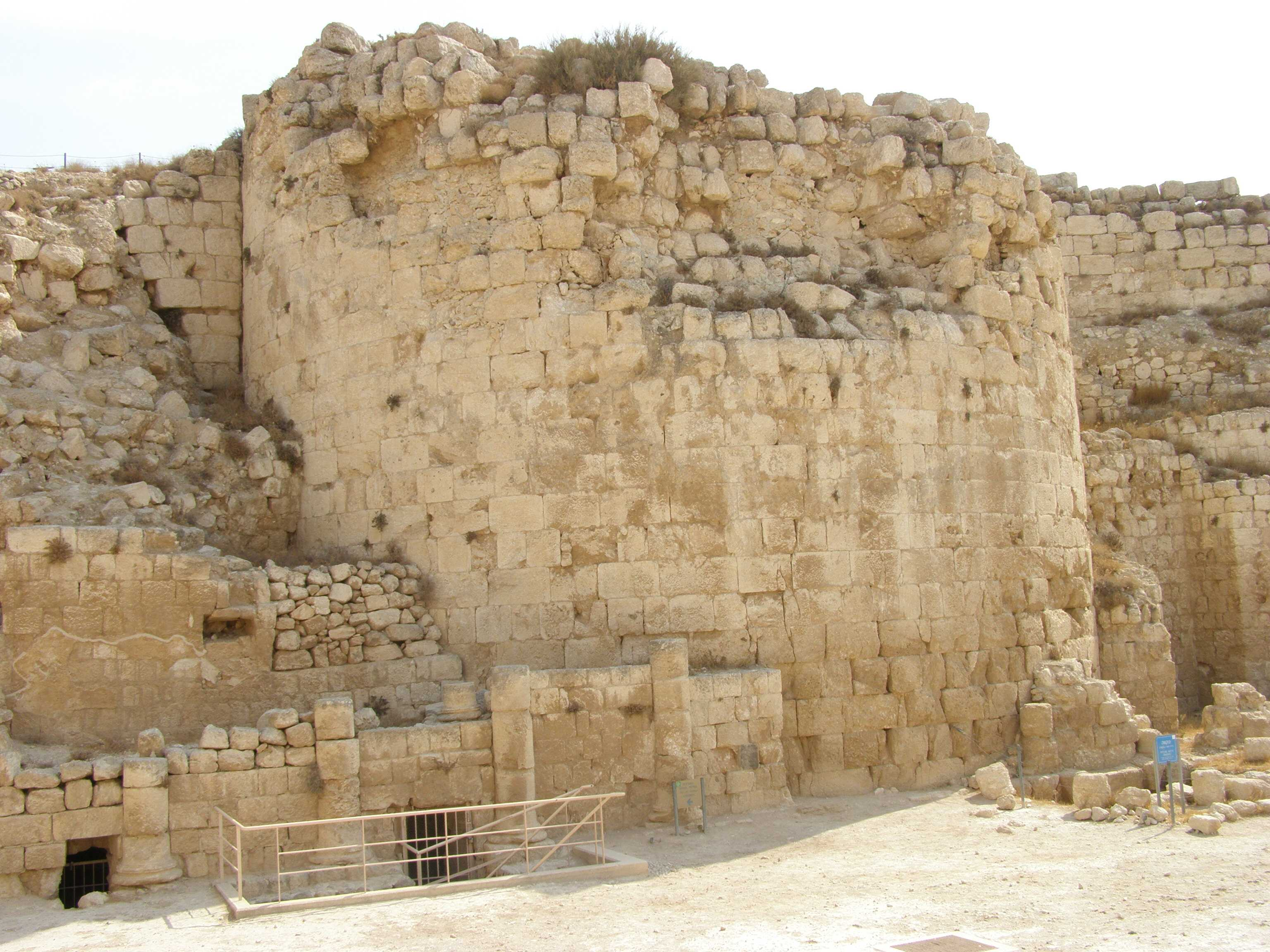
Remains of the eastern round tower

=== Upper Herodium ===
The archaeological excavation of Herodium was begun in 1962 by Virgilio Canio Corbo and Stanislao Loffreda, from the Studium Biblicum Franciscanum of Jerusalem, and it continued until 1967: they discovered the upper citadel, at the top of the hill.

=== Lower Herodium ===
From 1972, excavations were carried out by Ehud Netzer, working on behalf of the Hebrew University of Jerusalem, and they were intermittent until the archaeologist's death in 2010. Netzer excavated mostly the lower palace, at the base of the hill.

== Description ==
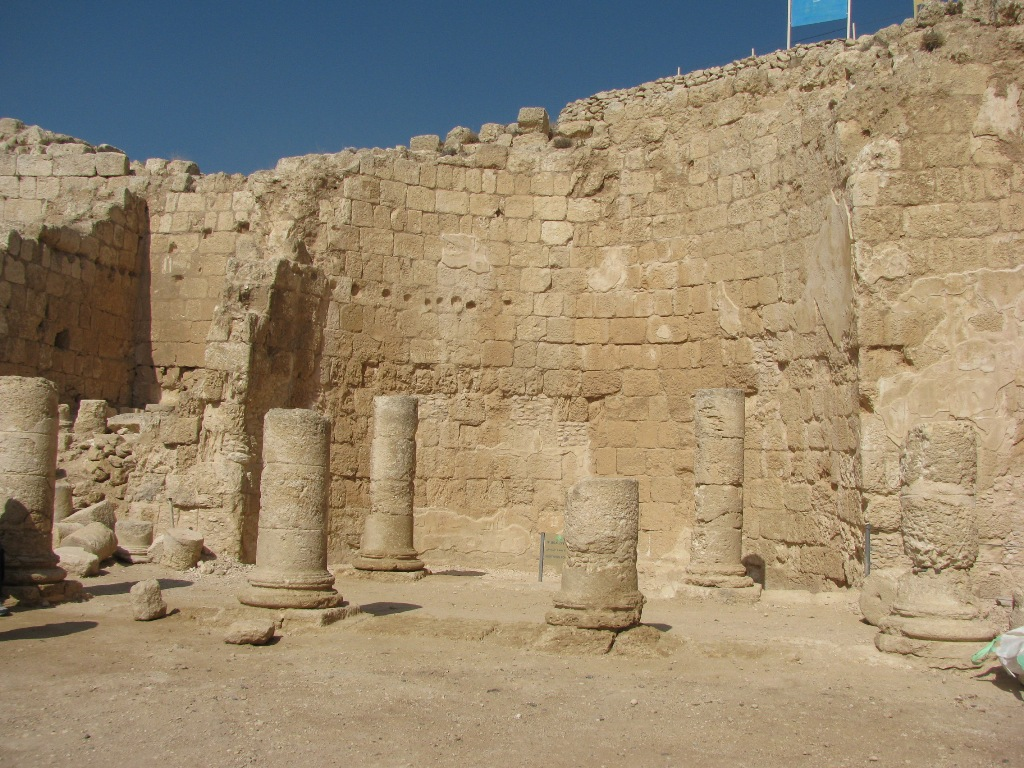
Palace garden, the northern exedra

=== Herod's hilltop palace ===
Herod the Great built a palace within the fortress of Herodium. Herod himself commissioned a lavish palace to be built between 23 and 15 BCE atop Herodium for all to see. The palace itself consisted of four towers of seven stories, a bathhouse, courtyards, a Roman theatre, banquet rooms, a large walkway ("the course"), as well as extravagant living quarters for himself and guests. Once Herod died and the Great Revolt started, Herodium was abandoned. The Jews eventually had a base at Herodium where they built a synagogue which can still be seen today, unlike much of Herod's Palace.

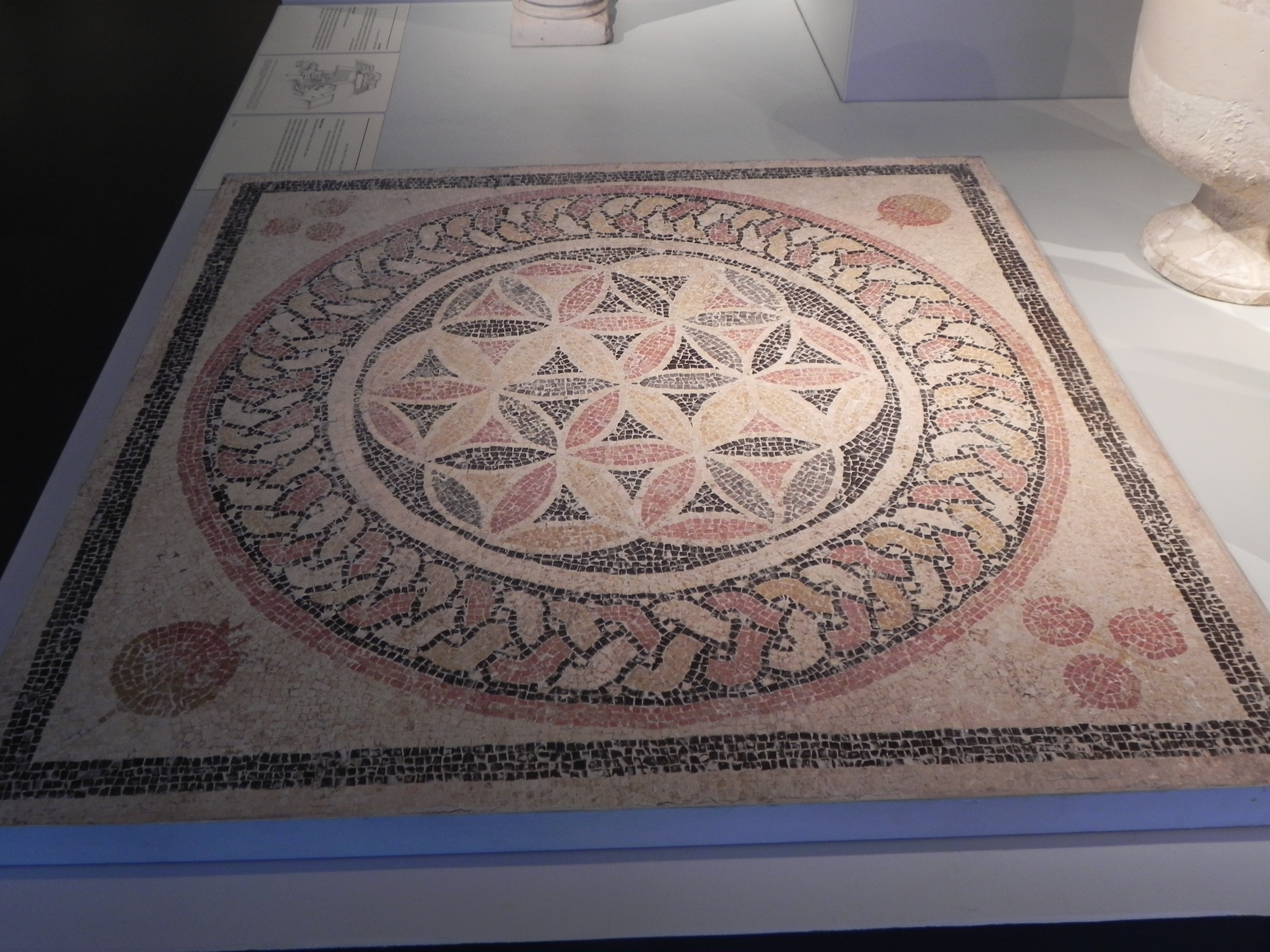
Section of mosaic floor unearthed at Herodion

==== Bathhouse ====
The Roman bathhouse consisted of three areas, the caldarium, the tepidarium, and the frigidarium. It also had a very impressive dome which is still in good condition today despite thousands of years of earthquakes and wars. The caldarium had vaulted ceilings, raised floors, and channels in the walls to conduct heat. The tepidarium had mosaic floors and frescoes just like the living quarters of the palace. The frigidarium, the last stop in the bathhouse, was where guests would cool off in a large pool.

==== Synagogue ====
During the First Jewish–Roman War, the defenders of Herodium repurposed an existing structure within the upper palace as a synagogue, considered one of the earliest in the Levant. The original space, formerly Herod's triclinium, underwent renovations that involved installing benches along the walls and constructing a mikveh outside the entrance. There is minimal evidence regarding any alterations made by the defenders to the existing decor or furnishings, and the space essentially functioned as a simple communal hall. The entrance faced eastward, while Jerusalem lay almost due north. The repurposed synagogue lacked specialized features commonly found in synagogues, such as a niche for housing the Torah scrolls and a reading desk.

==== Theatre ====
Netzer discovered the Roman Theatre just before his death in late 2010. The royal theatre was uncovered near the base of Herod's tomb. The theatre contained an elaborately decorated loggia, or a theatre box, was discovered. This means that when Herod or other notable officials went to see a play, they would receive luxury treatment. The rest of the audience would be seated below on benches that could accommodate about 450–650 people. What is quite unique about this find is that frescoes of landscapes were discovered, of a kind suggesting that the painters were well travelled; they depict scenes of Italy and even the Nile River in Egypt. It is also assumed that the painters were on loan to Herod from Caesar in Rome.

== Pilate ring ==
In 1968–1969, during excavations directed by archaeologist Gideon Foerster, at a section of Herod's burial tomb and palace hundreds of artifacts were found, including a copper alloy ring. The ring was overlooked but in 2018 it was given a thorough laboratory cleaning and scholarly examination. At the center of the ring is an engraved krater, or amphora similar in style to the monumental urn (handleless amphorae or acroteria) of Herodium which is encircled by "partly deformed" Greek letters spelling out "of Pilates" in Greek. Although scientists were not sure about who is the "Pilates" mentioned on the ring, media published that it could have possibly belonged to Pontius Pilate. Archaeologist Roi Porat said that all explanations are equally possible for the owner of the ring: "It was important to publish a careful scientific article, but in practice we have a ring inscribed with the name Pilate and the personal connection just cries out." While much of the debate has focused on the Greek name inscribed on the ring, the image is of equal significance and may further support that this was the ring used by Pilate's administrative assistant for sealing documents for Pilate. The image on the ring is possibly associated with Roman religious ceremonies (i.e., suovetaurilia, bacchanalia) and the imperial cult that were characteristic of the images on the coins that Pilate had minted during his term as governor.

== Legal aspects ==
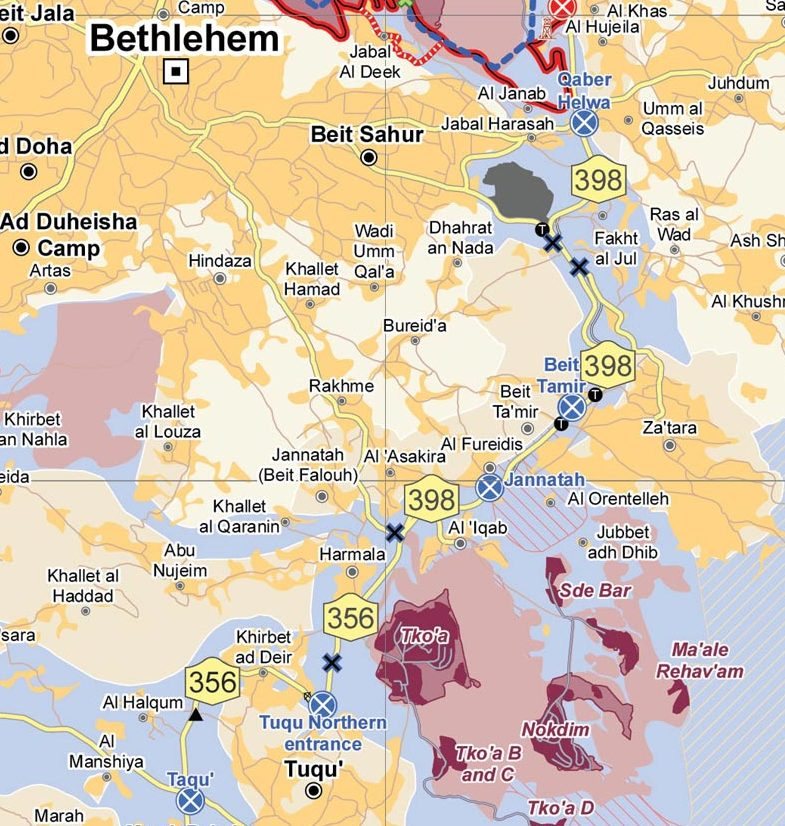
The area in a United Nations OCHA map of the West Bank; the Herodium national park is the diagonal hashed area shown west of Za'atara, east of the Jannatah checkpoint, and north of the Sdeh Bar Farm settlement. The Palestinian village of Al Orentellah is within the confines of the national park.

In February 2013 an exhibit dedicated to Herod at the Israel Museum featured finds from among some 30 tons of material transferred from the Herodium site back into Israel. The Palestinian National Authority protested, and Rula Maayah, the Palestinian tourism and antiquities minister said that according to international law Israelis have no right to excavate Herodium, which is in the occupied West Bank, or to take any antiquities from it. Palestinian officials compared the exhibition to the historical plunder of archaeological treasures by former colonial powers. Some Israeli commentators have argued that, such excavations of, and removal of material from, sites in the Palestinian territories go beyond what is permitted to an occupying power such as Israel. One Israeli archaeologist, Yonathan Mizrachi, in an article co-written with Yigal Bronner, stated that, 'Since Herodion and Herod's palaces in Jericho are located in the territories that Israel occupied in 1967, they are—according to international law, the codes of ethics for the preservation of antiquities, and even the Oslo Accords—supposedly under Palestinian control and responsibility.' The Israel Museum's director, James S. Snyder initially stated that the items from Herodium would be returned to the West Bank after the exhibition, "in better condition than before", but later clarified that this did not mean the artifacts would be returned to the Palestinians after the exhibition. The site is in Area C of the West Bank, under full Israeli control. The Israel Museum cited the Oslo Accords as giving Israel a right to perform archaeology in the territories and said they will return it to the West Bank when the exhibition has ended. In analyzing the controversy, Morag Kersel states that the site is regulated by Israeli military orders, the Jordanian Temporary Law no. 51, 1966, and the Oslo Accords. According to the provisions of the Oslo II Accord, archaeological issues of common interest would be handled by a joint Israeli–Palestinian committee. Few if any of these agreements have been implemented, and Palestinians have not been consulted or asked to collaborate in the work at the site.

== Films ==
- Herod's Lost Tomb (2008; National Geographic Society), in addition to examining Netzer's purported find of Herod's tomb, the palace and most of Herod's other large projects are reconstructed in CGI.
- "Finding Jesus: Faith, Fact, Forgery: Season 2, Episode 4: The tomb of Herod" (2017; CNN), the episode unpacks the epic story of the client king of Judea.
- Jesus Christ Superstar (1973), the song "Then We Are Decided" was filmed here.

== See also ==
- Ancient synagogues in the Palestine region - covers entire Palestine region/Land of Israel
- Herodian architecture
- John McRay
- Machaerus

== Bibliography ==
- Davies, Gwyn (2023). "Stamping Out the Embers: Roman "Mopping-Up" Operations at the End of the First Jewish Revolt". In Mizzi, Dennis; Grey, Matthew; Rassalle, Tine (eds.). Pushing Sacred Boundaries in Early Judaism and the Ancient Mediterranean. Supplements to the Journal for the Study of Judaism. Vol. 208. Brill. pp. 100–127. doi:10.1163/9789004540828_005. ISBN 978-9-004-54082-8. Archived from the original on 6 June 2023.
- Mor, Menahem (2016). The Second Jewish Revolt: The Bar Kokhba War, 132–136 CE. Brill. ISBN 978-90-04-31463-4.
- Rogers, Guy MacLean (2022). For the Freedom of Zion: The Great Revolt of Jews against Romans, 66–74 CE. Yale University Press. ISBN 978-0-300-24813-5. Archived from the original on 7 December 2024.
- Shatzman, Israel (1991). The Armies of the Hasmonaeans and Herod: From Hellenistic to Roman Frameworks. Tübingen: J.C.B. Mohr.
