= Umm ar-Rasas =

Um er-Rasas (Kastrom Mefa'a)
- أم الرّصاص (Arabic)
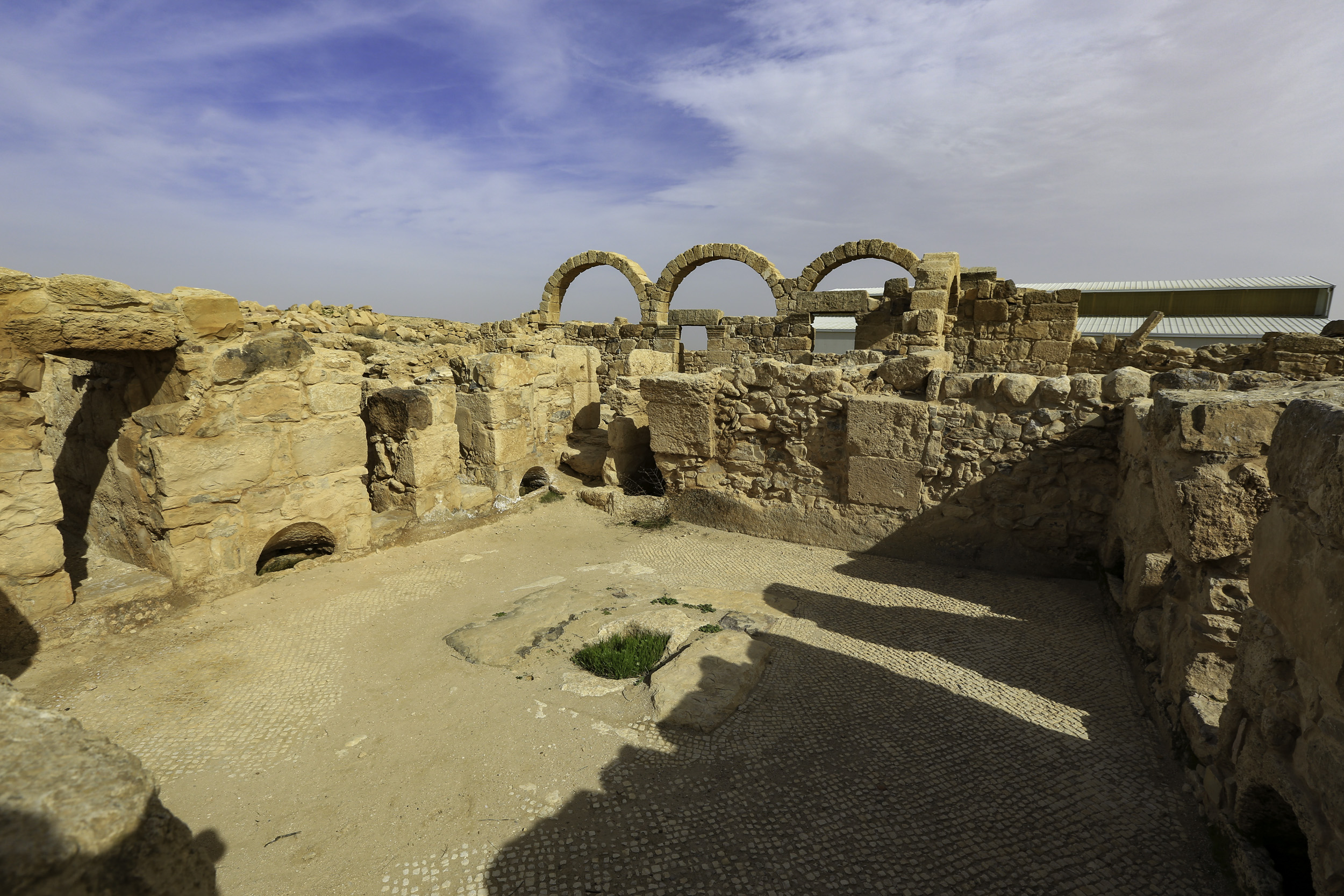

- Location within Jordan
- 31°30′2.83″N 35°55′12.95″E
- Location: Amman Governorate, Jordan

History
- Built: 5th Century

Site notes
- Elevation: 760
- Governing body: Ministry of Tourism & Antiquities of Jordan

UNESCO World Heritage Site
- Type: Cultural
- Criteria: i, iv, vi
- Designated: 2004 (28th session)
- Reference no.: 1093
- Region: Arab States

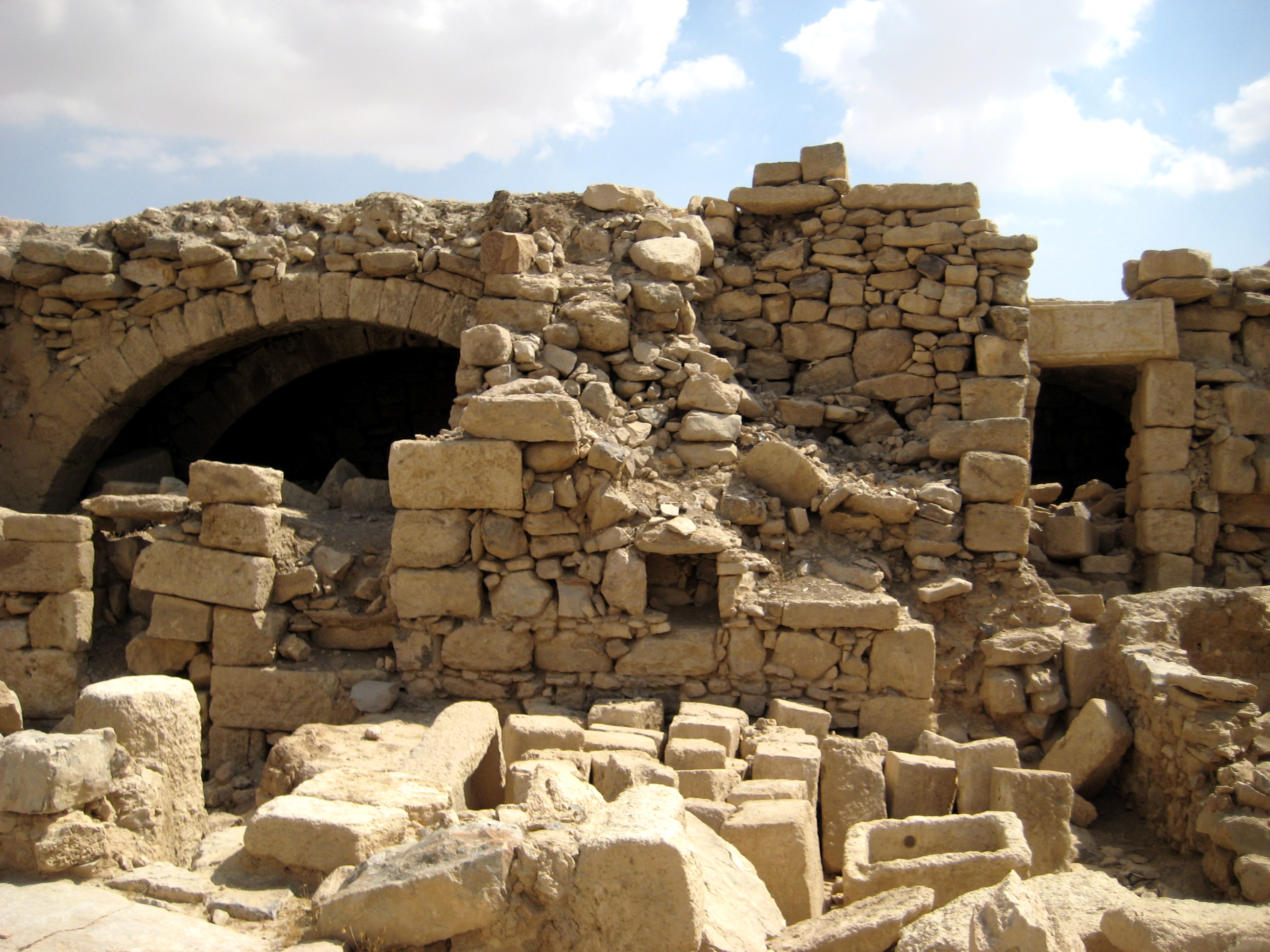
Ruins of a house from Umm Ar-Rasas.

Umm ar-Rasas (Arabic: أم الرّصاص; ancient name: Kastron Mefa'a) is located 30 km southeast of Madaba in the Amman Governorate in central Jordan. It was once accessible by branches of the King's Highway, and is situated in the semi-arid steppe region of the Jordanian Desert. The site has been associated with the biblical settlement of Mephaat mentioned in the Book of Jeremiah. The Roman military utilized the site as a strategic garrison, but it was later converted and inhabited by Christian and Islamic communities. In 2004, the site was inscribed as a UNESCO World Heritage Site, and is valued by archaeologists for its extensive ruins dating to the Roman, Byzantine, and early Muslim periods. The Franciscan academic society in Jerusalem, Studium Biblicum Franciscanum (SBF), carried out excavations at the north end of the site in 1986, but much of the area remains buried under debris.

== Early history ==
Particularly during the epochs of the Early Bronze Age III-IV, Iron Age II, and Roman-Byzantine eras, dense populations inhabited the topographical regions beyond the western banks of the Dead Sea. Among these ancient settlements, the site of Mephaat has been mentioned in biblical texts as one of the cities upon the plateau to be condemned to great destruction (Jeremiah 48:21). Many branches of the King's Highway provided a means for reaching the more remote ancient cities, but the main route served as the forerunner for the Via Traiana Nova built by the Roman Emperor Trajan (98–117 AD). This road with its many branches facilitated travel, and Roman military encampments were set in place along the way as a defensive measure against barbarian assaults across the Roman desert frontier known as the Limes Arabicus. Eusebius of Caesarea identified Mephaat as the camp site of a Roman army near the desert in his Onomasticon (K.128:21). Also, the excavation of a Byzantine church here exposed an inscription naming the area as "Castron Mephaa" further supporting the theory that Umm-ar Rasas and the biblical Mephaat are one and the same.

== Mosaics ==
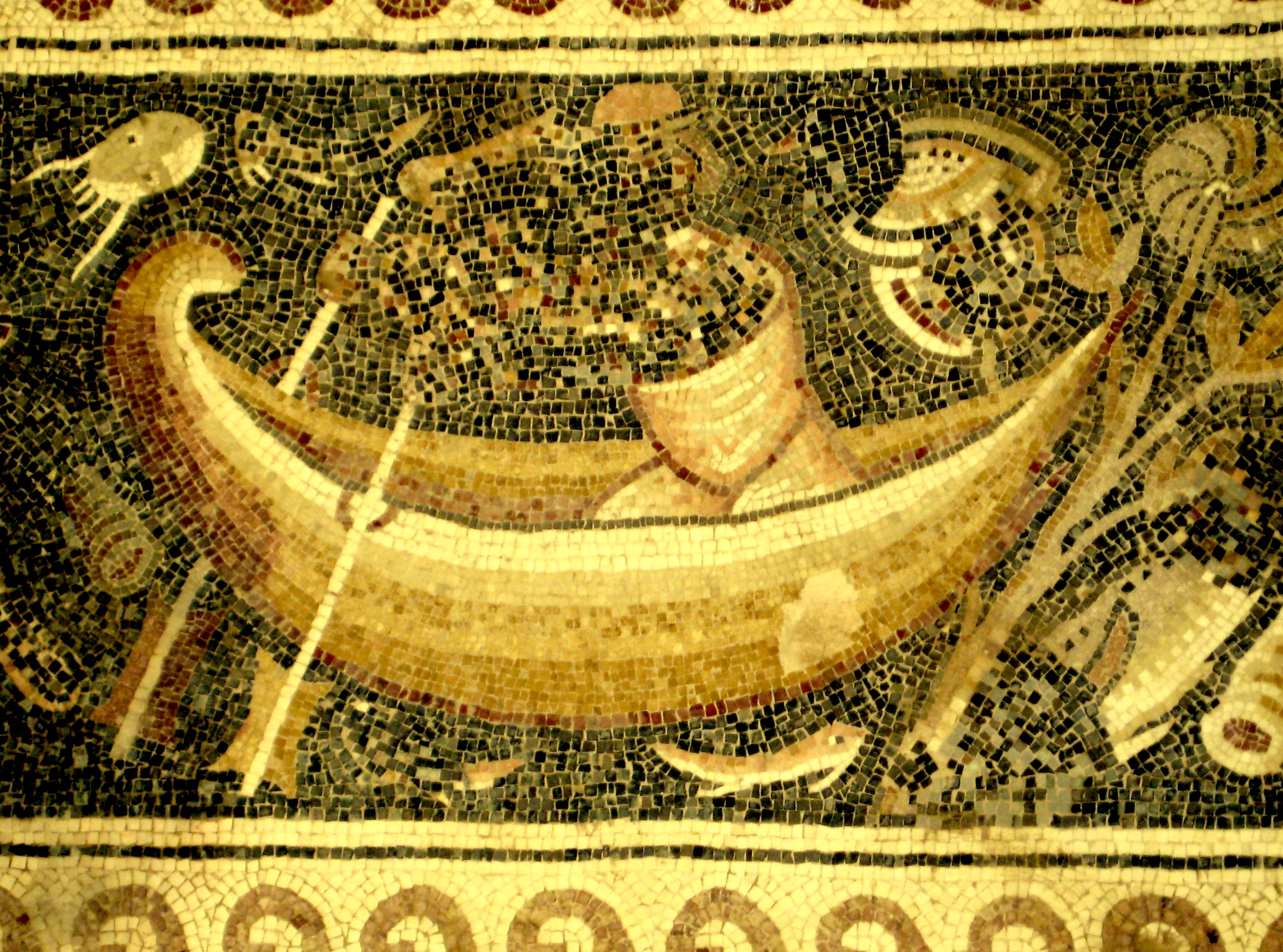
Fisherman, top half of figure erased

The most important discovery on the site was the mosaic floor of the Church of St Stephen. It was made in 785 (discovered after 1986). The perfectly preserved mosaic floor is the largest one in Jordan. On the central panel, hunting and fishing scenes are depicted, while another panel illustrates the most important cities of the region and Egypt including Alexandria, Pelusium, Philadelphia (Amman), Madaba, Esbounta (Heshbon), Belemounta (Ma'an), Areopolis (Ar-Rabba), Charac Moaba (Karak), Jerusalem, Nablus, Caesarea, and Gaza. The frame of the mosaic is especially decorative. Six mosaic masters signed the work: Staurachios from Esbus, Euremios, Elias, Constantinus, Germanus, and Abdela. To the north of the St. Stephen's church lies another, damaged, mosaic floor in the earlier (587) Church of Bishop Sergius. Another four churches were excavated nearby, some with traces of mosaic decoration.

== Byzantine period ==
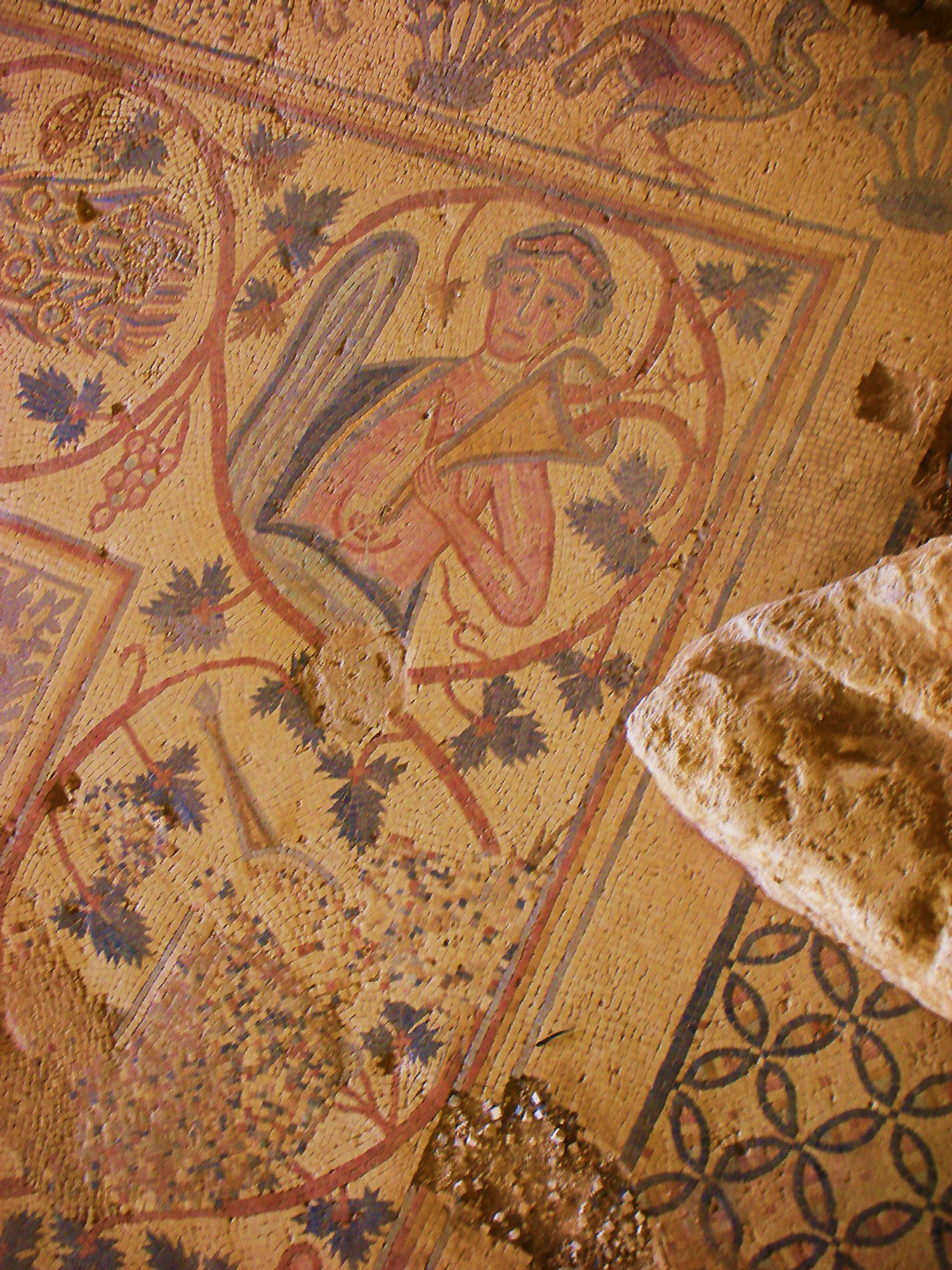
The only known remaining icon left in the complex

By the 4th century C.E., the advent of pilgrimage caused Palestine to become the nucleus of the Christian world, and scores of pious men and women traversed the desert seeking sites of scriptural significance as well as communion with their creator. The number of pilgrims intensified by the 5th century C.E., and many Christians chose to settle in the desert establishing monastic communities. Umm ar-Rasas was converted into an ecclesiastical center boasting numerous Byzantine churches. Among the notable finds unearthed at Umm-ar Rasas is the Church of Saint Stephen, which features elaborate and sophisticated mosaics. The discovery of Greek inscriptions within the mosaics confirmed dating to 756-785 C.E. The date range coincides with the Abbasid Caliphate period of Muslim rule, and demonstrates Christian occupation later than surrounding areas. The mosaics illustrate municipal vignettes with explanatory text covering a series of cities in Palestine, Jordan, and along the Nile Delta. Absent from the mosaics at Umm ar-Rasas are portrayals of principal holy places revered by pilgrims such as Bethlehem, Hebron or Nazareth unlike the Madaba Map found nearby.

=== Stylite tower ===
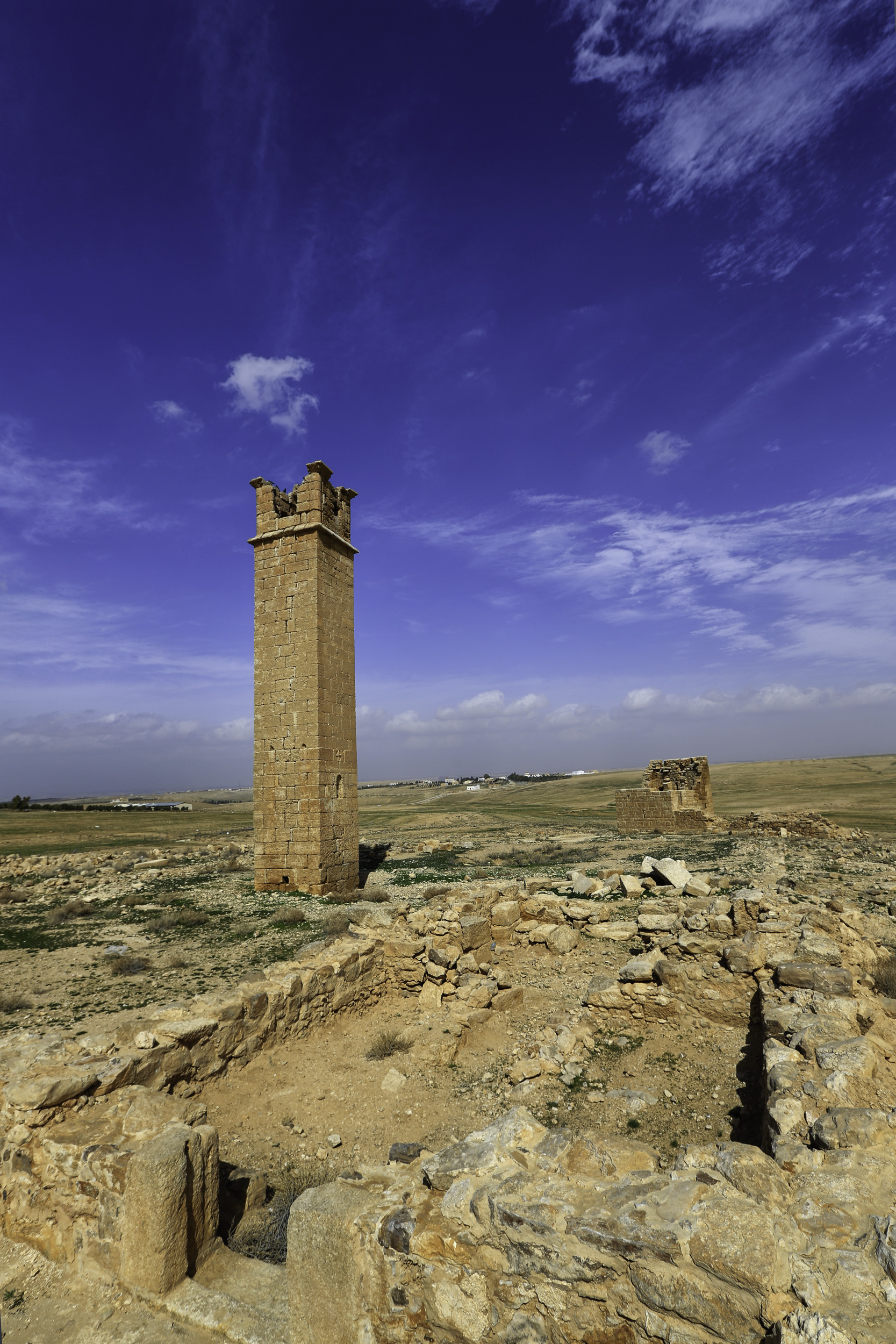
Stylite tower as seen from afar

The salient feature of Umm ar-Rasas stands about 1 mile (1.6 km) north of the walled ruins. Interpreted to be a stylite tower, the soaring structure served as a platform for Christian ascetics living in isolation at the top as well as an altar for a call to prayer. Ornamented with carved Christian symbols on all four sides, the square pillar endures in the distance as evidence of the once flourishing community established in the Byzantine era as a center for spiritual enlightenment.

== Muslim conquest ==
Muslim armies penetrated Palestine during the summer of 634 C.E., and initially assaulted regions along the Mediterranean coast including the Gaza Strip. Discontented with Byzantine control, local Arab-speaking tribesmen living in the desert expanses willingly aided the Muslim invaders easing their conquest. The efficacious campaign was characterized by limited destruction, and many cities of the Holy Land surrendered on terms to Muslim rule. Byzantine churches were infrequently transformed into mosques, but especially during the Abbasid period, the Muslim government actively enforced restrictive laws against Christian images. Mosaics were defaced by the removal and reassembly of colored tesserae as seen at the Church of Saint Stephen. Following the Muslim victory, Christians continued to make pilgrimages to holy places, however, the numbers declined with the threat of imprisonment by Muslim officials. Many of the monasteries and churches built by Byzantine Christians were ultimately abandoned.

== Gallery ==
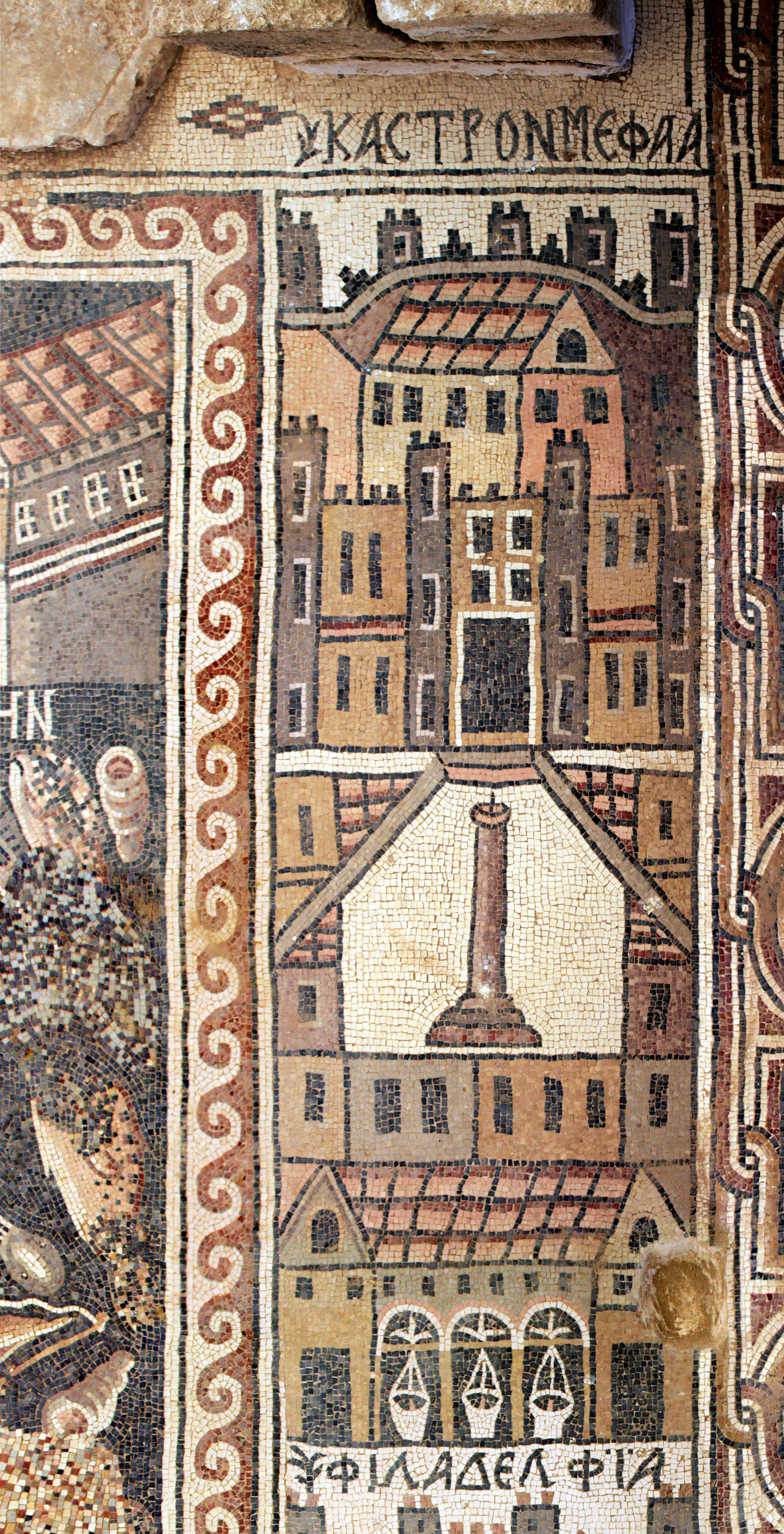
Church of St. Stephen. It is an abstract representation of Kastron Mephaa itself with a column as center.

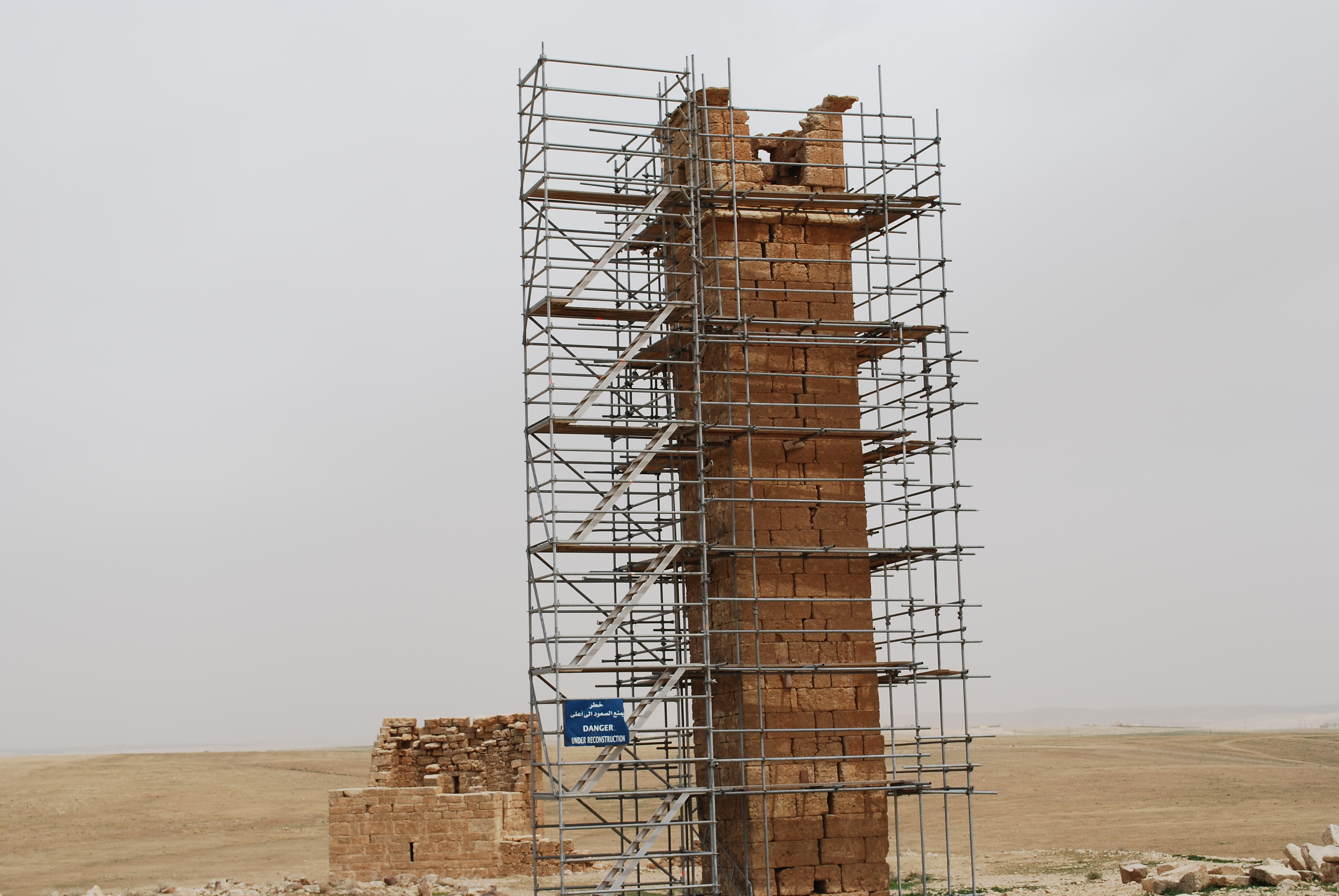
restoration work on Tower in 2017

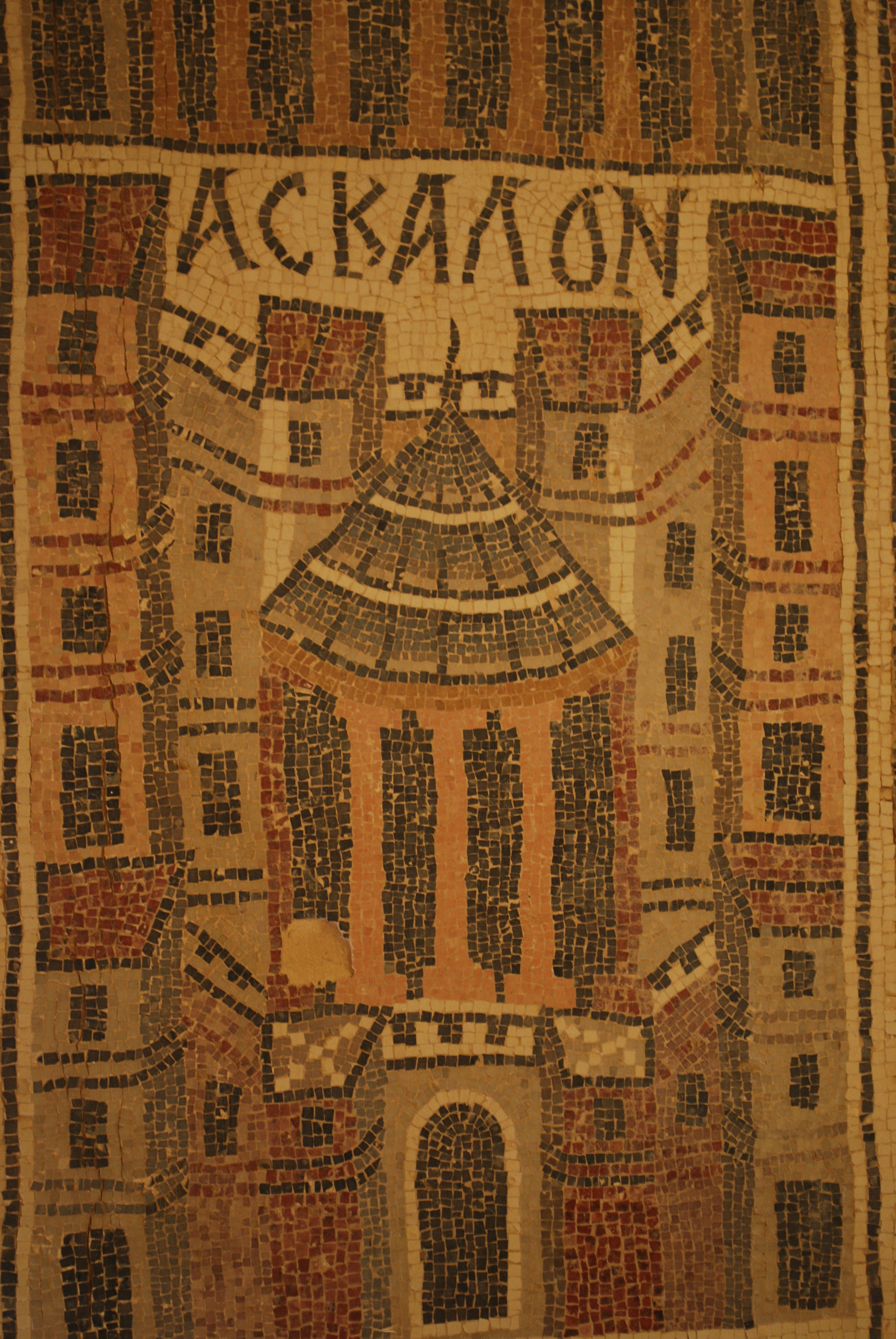
Interior mosaics. A representation of Askalon.

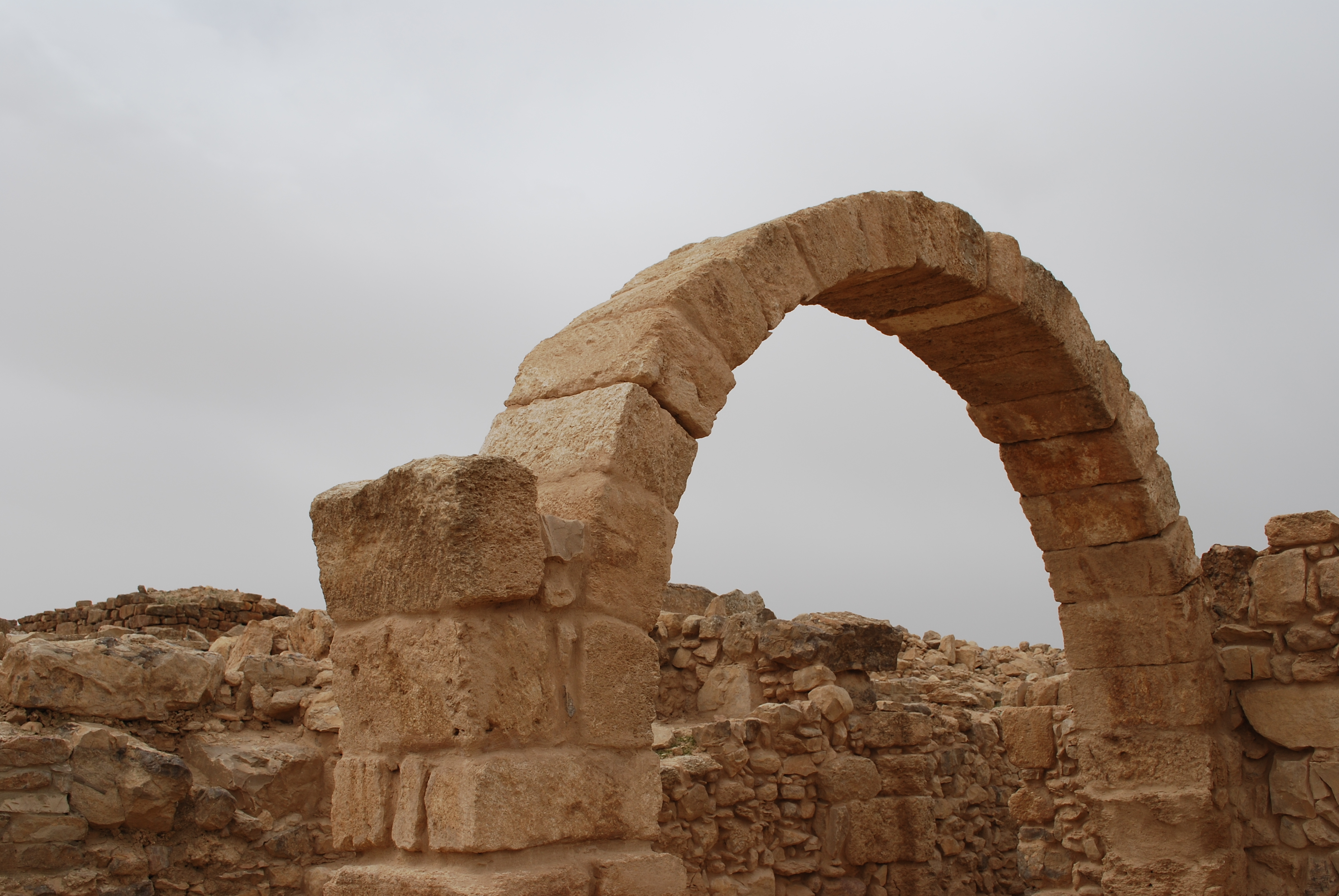
arch from an oblique angle

== See also ==
- Early Byzantine mosaics in the Middle East
- Michele Piccirillo, SBF archaeologist who led the digs and published the results
- Petra
- Wadi Rum
- Qasr Amra
- List of World Heritage Sites in Jordan
