= Tomb of Herod =

Burial site

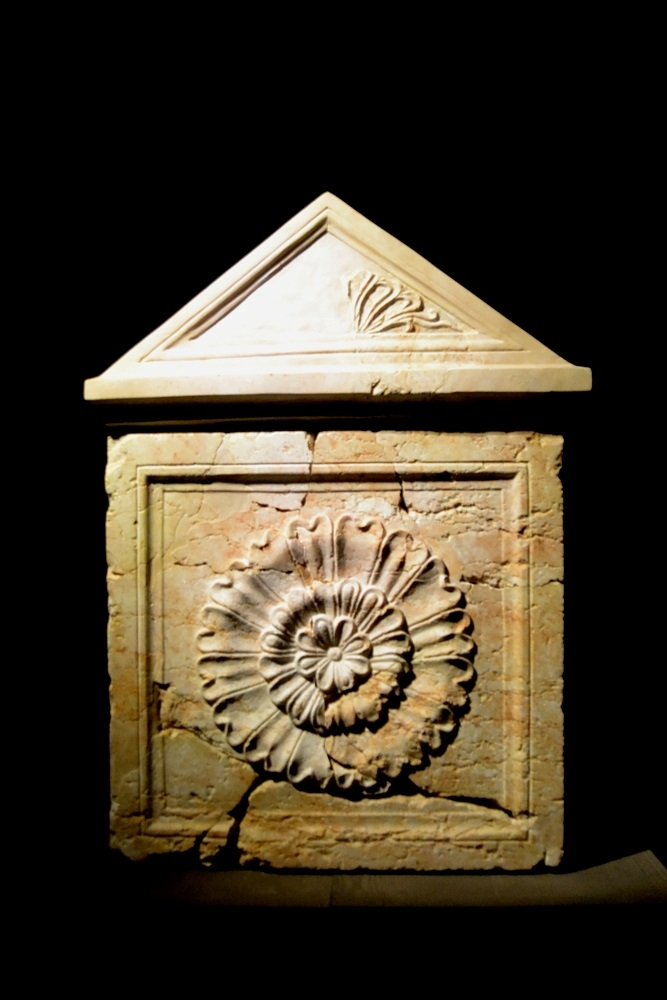
Herod's sarcophagus

The tomb of Herod was discovered by Hebrew University professor Ehud Netzer on 8 May 2007 with his team of archeologists, above tunnels and water pools at a flattened site halfway up the hill to the hilltop palace-fortress of Herodium, 12 kilometres (7.5 mi) south of Jerusalem. Later excavations strengthened the idea that this site is Herod's mausoleum. The base of the tomb has now been uncovered and is visible to visitors to the site. His team consisted of Roi Porat, Yakov Kalman and Rachel Chachy-Laureys.

The 2009–2010 excavations near the base of the tomb uncovered a small theatre which could seat 450–650 people.

Netzer died in October 2010 from injuries sustained from a fall at the site, and access to the mausoleum was subsequently blocked to the public pending review of the site's safety.

In October 2013, archaeologists Joseph Patrich and Benjamin Arubas challenged the identification of the tomb as that of Herod. According to Patrich and Arubas, the tomb is too modest to be Herod's and has several unlikely features. Roi Porat, who replaced Netzer as excavation leader after the latter's death, stood by the identification.

Fragments of three stone sarcophagi were found near the mausoleum: one of them was reddish and the other two light-colored. The reddish sarcophagus, decorated in a sumptuous but restrained style, was identified by the excavators as Herod's sarcophagus. It was found smashed into hundreds of pieces. Scholars suggested that this sarcophagus held the king's body and was destroyed by Jewish rebels during the Jewish–Roman war. The sarcophagus is displayed today at the Israel Museum.

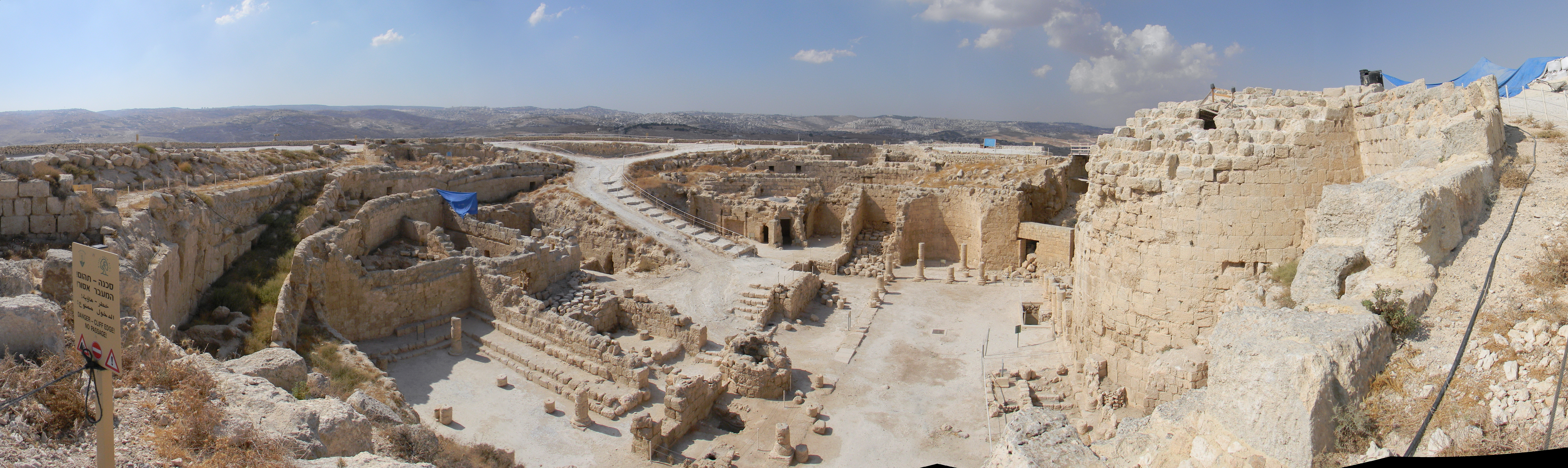
Panoramic view of Herodium's hilltop palace-fortress, looking west (starting from left) moving towards north (to the right), ending with the large eastern tower.
