= Wadi Qelt Synagogue =

Former ancients synagogue in West Bank, Palestine

- Location of the former ancient synagogue in the West Bank

Religion
- Affiliation: Judaism (former)
- Ecclesiastical or organizational status: Ancient synagogue; Archeological site
- Status: Ruins

Location
- Location: Tulul Abu al-'Alayiq in Wadi Qelt, site of the Hasmonean royal winter palaces, outside Jericho, West Bank
- Country: State of Palestine
- Interactive map of Wadi Qelt Synagogue
- Coordinates: 31°50′40″N 35°24′51″E

Architecture
- Established: Hasmonean-period

Site notes
- Archaeologists: Ehud Netzer
- Condition: Ruin; entire site under constant degradation since excavation

The Wadi Qelt Synagogue is claimed to be a former ancient Jewish synagogue and archeological site, located in Wadi Qelt, outside Jericho, in the West Bank, in the State of Palestine. The site is part of the royal winter palace complex built by the Hasmoneans in the warm desert oasis of Jericho, west of the town.

According to Ehud Netzer, the excavator and archaeologist of the ruins, the former building was identified as a Hasmonean-period synagogue; however, the claim of the ruins being a synagogue have been disputed. The ruins date from between 70 and 50 BCE, and if the former building did serve as a synagogue, it would be one of the oldest synagogues known.

== History ==
The synagogue was a modest building of stone and sun-baked brick. It included a ritual bath and a small courtyard surrounded by seven or eight rooms with a rectangular main hall measuring 16 by 11 m (53 by 37 ft). The hall was bordered by a colonnade, the platform of which was nearly two feet above the floor of the nave. This provided seating for nearly 70 people. In the northeastern corner, Netzer found a niche that may have served as a Torah Ark. A lower compartment, mostly intact, is thought to have possibly functioned as a genizah or storage compartment where old or unused scrolls were stored. Adjacent to the western side of the main hall was a triclinium, or dining hall, where public meals could be held, and a small, triangular space that may have been used as a kitchen. The triclinium was added some years after the main hall was built. Diners reclined, Roman style, on benches against three walls of the chamber while eating. The floors and walls were covered with white plaster.

=== Controversy ===
Despite the excavator's identification of a building among the Hasmonean palatial complex near Wadi Qelt as a synagogue, the matter is far from conclusive. In fact, few scholars seriously consider this suggestion in discussions of Second Temple period synagogues, though even fewer have openly challenged the identification in print.

== See also ==
- Ancient synagogues in Israel
- History of the Jews in Palestine
- List of oldest synagogues
