= Michele Piccirillo (archaeologist) =

Franciscan expert in Byzantine archaeology

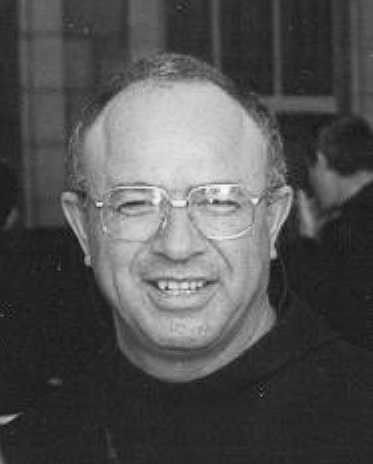
- Born: 18 November 1944; Casanova di Carinola, Italy
- Died: 26 October 2008 (aged 63); Livorno, Italy
- Resting place: Mount Nebo
- Education: Pontifical universities in Rome; Sapienza University of Rome
- Scientific career
- Fields: Byzantine archaeology
- Workplaces: Studium Biblicum Franciscanum, Jerusalem

Michele Piccirillo (1944–2008) was a Franciscan priest and expert in Byzantine archaeology. He is credited with advancing the study of early Byzantine archaeology, and especially the study of mosaics, in Jordan, Palestine and Syria.

== Life ==
=== Early life and studies ===
Piccirillo was born in Casanova di Carinola, Italy, on 18 November 1944, and joined the Franciscans early on, in 1960. In 1969 he was ordained a priest, after which he combined his pious and academic activities, studying biblical and early Byzantine archaeology. In 1970 he took his Licence in Theology from the PAA in Rome, followed in 1974 by a Licentiate in Holy Scripture from the PIB and a Laureate in archaeology the following year, this time from the state university of Rome.

=== Career ===
Starting in 1975, Piccirillo taught biblical history and biblical geography in Jerusalem, where he had become part of the Franciscan Custody of the Holy Land. As an archaeologist, he was among those who excavated some of the earliest churches in the Holy Land, which he published without the customary delay. This helped him position himself as an expert in this field and brought him international support for his projects in Jordan, Palestine and Syria.

==== Church continuity in Islamic periods ====
One of Piccirillo's main contributions in Church history was to demonstrate, based on archaeological proof, that early Byzantine traditions did not come to an end with the Muslim conquest of the Levant, but survived into the Islamic periods, a position meanwhile adopted by most scholars.

==== Mosaic conservation ====
Piccirillo's interest for ancient mosaics motivated him to work for their preservation, including by co-founding a mosaic school in Madaba, Jordan, which under his guidance became today's Madaba School for Mosaic Art and Restoration. He went on with a similar project in Jericho in Palestine, centered around mosaic studies and the preservation of the Umayyad site at Khirbet al-Mafjar, known as Hisham's Palace. Another project of this kind he was involved in led to the building of a large shelter over the remains of the fifth-century Holy Martyrs Church at Taybat al-Imam in Syria.

==== With Studium Biblicum Franciscanum ====
During Piccirillo's work at the Studium Biblicum Franciscanum (SBF) in Jerusalem, he received his Professorship in 1984, acted as the director of the SBF museum in Jerusalem (1974-2008), and headed the SFB archaeological mission in Jordan, with excavations at Mount Nebo, Umm ar-Rasas (discovering the Umm ar-Rasas mosaics) and in the area of Madaba. Much of his energy went into excavating and preserving the Byzantine churches at Mount Nebo, the new shelter built there over the remains of the Memorial Church of Moses being closely associated with his name. He was the head of the Franciscan Archaeological Institute at Mount Nebo.

==== Baptism site of Jesus ====
The rediscovery of the traditional site of the Baptism of Jesus with its mainly Byzantine-era remains at Al-Maghtas must also be credited to Piccirillo, who led Prince Ghazi bin Muhammad to the site and set in motion the excavation, preservation and development of Al-Maghtas.

=== Death ===
Michele Piccirillo died of pancreatic cancer on 26 October 2008 in Livorno, Italy, and was laid to rest at Mt Nebo.

== Published work ==
Piccirillo has published dozens of scholarly articles as well as several books, among them

- Piccirillo, Michele; Storme, Albert (January 1981). "LES ANTIQUITÉS DE RIḤAB DES BENÊ ḤASAN". Revue Biblique (in French). 88 (1). Peeters Publishers: 62–69.
- The Mosaics of Jordan (1993), Amman: ACOR, dealing with the entire corpus of Jordan's ancient mosaics
- Umm al-Rasas Mayfa'ah: Gli scavi del complesso di Santo Stefano (1994) ['Umm al-Rasas Mayfa'ah: The excavation of the St Stephen Complex'], as main author and co-editor with Eugenio Alliata, Jerusalem: SBF, Collectio Maior 28
- Mount Nebo: New Archaeological Excavations 1967-1997 (1998), SBF, Collectio Maior 27
- The Madaba Map Centenary 1897-1997 (1999), SBF

== See also ==
- Early Byzantine mosaics in the Middle East
- Virgilio Canio Corbo (1918-1991), Franciscan archaeologist
- Stanislao Loffreda (b. 1932), Franciscan archaeologist
