= Frédéric Manns =

French biblist (1942–2021)

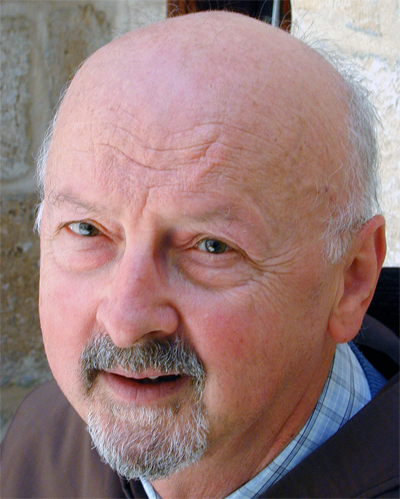
- Manns in 2011
- Born: 3 October 1942; Windthorst, Croatia
- Died: 22 December 2021 (aged 79); Jerusalem, Israel
- Occupation: Biblist

Frédéric Manns (3 October 1942 – 22 December 2021) was a French biblical scholar.

== Biography ==
Manns studied at a seminary in Metz and joined the Order of Friars Minor following secondary school. After his military service, he began studying theology at the Couvent franciscain de la Clarté-Dieu. He was ordained a priest in 1969 and subsequently began his Bible studies in Rome. A Franciscan, he became a professor of New Testament exegesis in 1972 and directed the Faculty of Biblical Sciences at Studium Biblicum Franciscanum from 1996 to 2001. He specialized in the study of Christianity and Judaism in the early Common Era and particularly focused on the Gospel of John.

He died in Jerusalem on 22 December 2021, at the age of 79.

== Works ==
- Essais sur le judéo-christianisme (1977)
- Bibliographie du judéo-christianisme (1979)
- Le symbole eau-esprit dans le judaïsme ancien (1983)
- Pour lire la Mishna (1984)
- La prière d'Israël à l'heure de Jésus (1986)
- Le récit de la dormition de la Vierge. Contribution à l'étude des origines de l'exégèse chrétienne (1989)
- L'Évangile de Jean à la lumière du judaïsme (1991)
- Le judaïsme, milieu et mémoire du Nouveau Testament (1992)
- Jésus, fils de David (1994)
- Lire la Bible en Église (1996)
- L'Israël de Dieu, essai sur le christianisme primitif (1996)
- « Là où est l'esprit, là est la liberté » (1998)
- Une approche juive du Nouveau Testament (1999)
- Abba, au risque de la paternité de Dieu (1999)
- Le judéo-christianisme, mémoire ou prophétie (2000)
- Le midrash, approche et commentaire de l'Écriture (2001)
- Les enfants de Rebecca, judaïsme et christianisme aux premiers siècles de notre ère (2001)
- L'Évangile de Jean et la sagesse (2003)
- Il avait deux fils, judaïsme et christianisme en dialogue (2004)
- Heureuse es-tu toi qui as cru. Marie, une femme juive (2005)
- Les Racines juives du christianisme (2006)
- Que sait-on de Marie et de la Nativité ? (2006)
- Shaoul de Tarsos, l'appel du large (2008)
- Voici l'homme. une lecture juive des Évangiles (2008)
- Sinfonia della parola (2009)
- François, va répare mon Église (2009)
- Qu'est-ce que la nouvelle évangélisation ? (2012)
