= John McRay =

American archaeologist and New Testament scholar (1931-2018)

- Born: December 17, 1931; Holdenville, Oklahoma, US
- Died: August 24, 2018 (aged 86); Nashville, Tennessee, US

Academic background
- Education: Harding College; University of Chicago
- Thesis: The fact and nature of eternal punishment in the New Testament

Academic work
- Discipline: archeology theology
- Institutions: Harding University; Lipscomb University; Middle Tennessee State University; Wheaton College
- Notable works: Archaeology and the New Testament

John Robert McRay (1931 – 2018) was an archaeologist, and professor emeritus of New Testament at Wheaton College (Illinois). He directed archaeological excavations in Israel, and "his articles have appeared in [several] encyclopedias and dictionaires". He "has lectured widely on archaeology and the Bible at various colleges, universities, professional meetings and churches in the United States".

== Life ==
McRay was born in Holdenville, Oklahoma. His wife's name is Annette.

He died at the age of 86 on August 24, 2018, in Nashville, Tennessee.

=== Education ===
In 1956 McRay earned a M.A. at Harding College, with the thesis The fact and nature of eternal punishment in the New Testament. He completed his Ph.D. in New Testament at the University of Chicago in 1967. He also studied at the Hebrew University, at the École biblique et archéologique française de Jérusalem, and at Vanderbilt University Divinity School.

=== Teaching ===
From 1956 to 2002, McRay taught at four colleges: Harding University, Lipscomb University, Middle Tennessee State University and Wheaton College. After McRay got his PhD, he went on to teach at Middle Tennessee State University, David Lipscomb College (now Lipscomb University), and Harding Graduate School. From 1980 McRay joined the Wheaton's faculty, and until 2002 (for more than fifteen years), he taught in biblical studies at Wheaton College. When he retired, he was awarded emeritus status.

=== Excavating teams ===
McRay supervised excavating teams in the Holy Land for almost 8 years in Caesarea, Sepphoris, and Herodium in Israel. He also was an expert in the languages, cultures, geography, and history of Israel-Palestine.

=== Organizations ===
McRay was associate to the Albright Institute of Archaeological Research in Jerusalem, American Schools of Oriental Research, and a member of the editorial boards of Near East Archaeological Society Bulletin, Archaeology in the Biblical World and the Bulletin for Biblical Research, published by Institute for Biblical Research.

== Works ==
- McRay, John (1956). The fact and nature of eternal punishment in the New Testament (M.A. Harding College 1956). OCLC 457384212.

=== Books ===
- Alfred J. Hoerth; John McRay (2019). The Bible Archaeology: An Exploration of the History and Culture of Early Civilizations. Lion Hudson Plc. ISBN 9780857216977.
- John McRay (2008). Archaeology and the New Testament. Baker Academic. ISBN 9780801036088.
- John McRay (2003). Paul: His Life and Teaching. Baker Academic. ISBN 9780801024030.
