= Virgilio Canio Corbo =

Italian priest and archaeologist (1918–1991)

Virgilio Canio Corbo (1918 in Avigliano – December 6, 1991 in Capernaum) was an Italian Franciscan Friar and professor of archaeology at the Studium Biblicum Franciscanum in Jerusalem.

== Life ==
Virgilio Canio Corbo was born in Avigliano, Italy on July 8, 1918. At the age of ten, he entered the minor seminary Franciscan Custody of Terra Santa (CTS). He was ordained a priest in Bethlehem in 1942. From 1946 to 1949 he studied at the Pontifical Oriental Institute in Rome, where he obtained a doctorate in Oriental Science. (His thesis, The excavations of Kh. Siyar El-Ghanam (Shepherd's Field) and the surrounding monasteries, was published in 1955.)

== Archaeological exploration ==
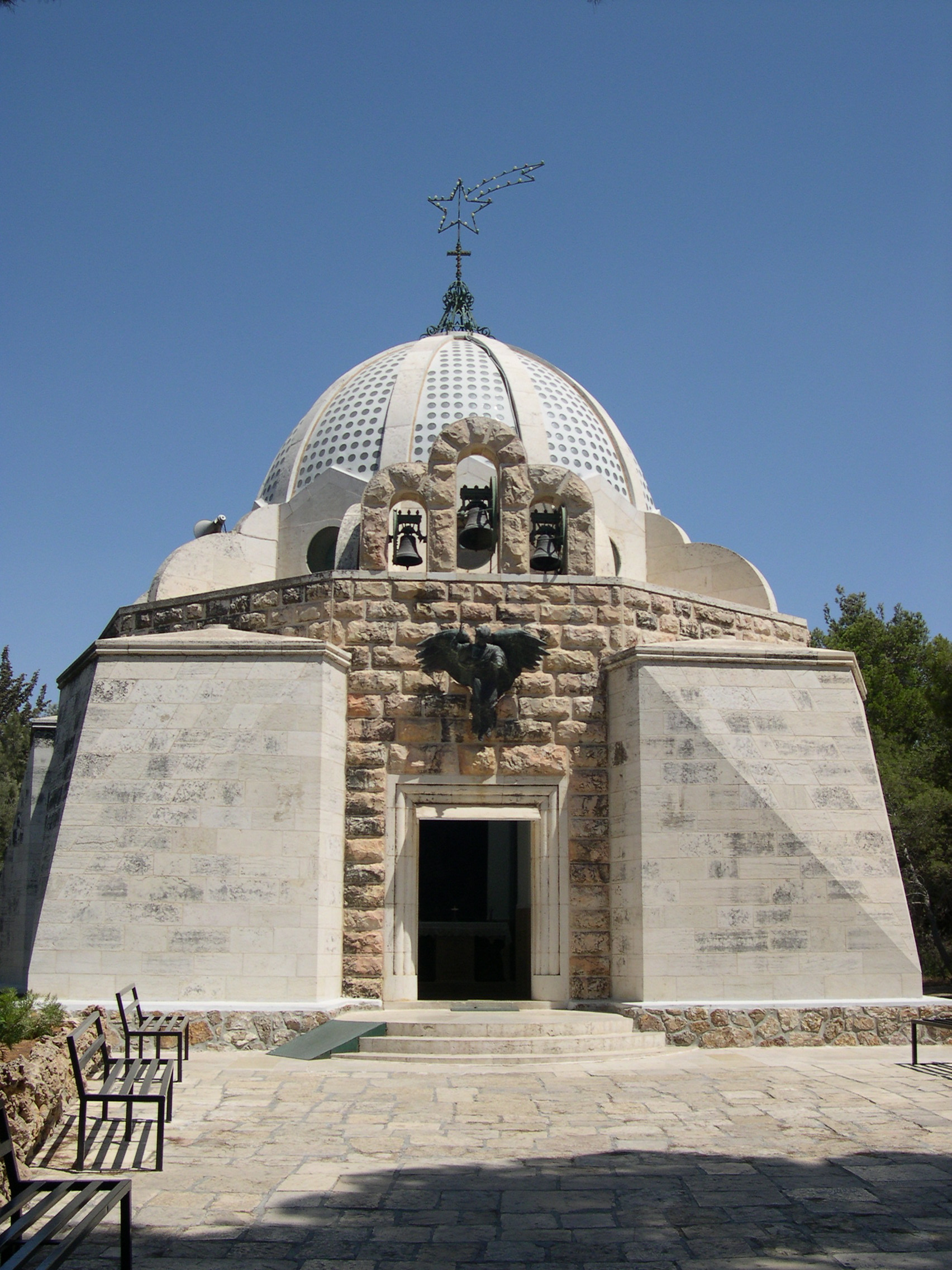
Church at Shepherd's Field

Corbo began teaching, first at the Franciscan minor seminary in Al-Qubeiba, and from 1950 to 1968 at the major Franciscan seminary in Jerusalem. While at Al-Qubeiba, he became interested in the work of archaeologist and fellow Franciscan Bellarmino Bagatti, and made some experimental excavations in the village. In expanding his investigations to other monastic ruins, and through literary sources was able to identify the monastery of St. Theodore at Bir el Qutt. Here he discovered the oldest extant Georgian inscriptions yet found. These give an important look into the everyday life of the early monks. In October 1987, on a visit to Jerusalem, Ilia II of Georgia, Catholicos-Patriarch of All Georgia presented Corbo with a commemorative coin celebrating 1500 years of the Evangelization of Georgia for helping to increase awareness of the Georgian monastic tradition in the Holy Land.

He will be remembered for excavating many important holy places. Father Corbo was responsible for organizing the Terra Sancta pavilion at the exhibition of missionary art for the 1950 Holy Year. This resulted in the publication of Sacred art in the Holy Places. From 1950 to 1955, Corbo was director of the magazine La Terra Santa, and in 1951 was put in charge of the restoration of a number of shrines administered by CTS. In this he worked with architect Antonio Barluzzi. One of the buildings restored was the Chapel of the Shepherd's Field, another was the Church of Saint John the Baptist, Ein Karem. From 1956 to 1959, he was custos of the friary at Gethsemane.

In 1962 Corbo and Stanislao Loffreda, from the Studium Biblicum Franciscanum of Jerusalem, began archaeological excavation of the Herodium. Work continued until 1967: they discovered the upper citadel, at the top of the hill.

Corbo also excavated the interior of the Byzantine basilica on Mount Nebo. In 1963, he was put in charge of restoring the original pavements for exhibition. In the modern chapel presbytery, built to protect the site and provide worship space, remnants of mosaic floors from different periods can be seen.

In 1968 Corbo and Loffreda began work at Capharnaum. Between 1971 and 1977 they began work at Magdala. From 1978 to 1981, they carried out excavations were carried out at Machaerus. Corbo's group was the first to prove that the castle of Machaerus was definitely one of the mosaic-decorated fortified palaces of King Herod the Great.

His name will be especially tied to two sacred places: the Holy Sepulcher and Capharnaum, the "city of Jesus".

He is remembered for the excavations of many religious sites:

- the "Shepherds' field" near Bethlehem
- the place of the Ascension on the Mount of Olives
- Herodium, a fortress-palace and funeral site of Herod the Great
- Machaerus, another Herodian fortress-palace across the Dead Sea in modern-day Jordan, the site of the decapitation of St John the Baptist
- the Old Georgian Bir el Qutt inscriptions
- a Byzantine basilica and monastery on Mt. Nebo in Jordan
- the church of the Holy Sepulchre
- the ancient city of Magdala

Corbo died in Capharnaum on December 6, 1991.

== Works ==
- Archaeological research at the Mount of Olives (1965)
- The Capernaum synagogue after the excavations in 1969 (1970)
- The house of Saint Peter at Capharnaum (1972)
- Capernaum I (1975)

== See also ==
- Michele Piccirillo (1944–2008), Franciscan priest and expert in Byzantine archaeology
- Besik Khurtsilava. Virgilio Corbo and the Georgian cultural heritage in Palestine https://www.academia.edu/92442428/BESIK_KHURTSILAVA_VIRGILIO_CORBO_TERRA_SANCTA_MUSEUM_AND_GEORGIAN_CULTURAL_HERITAGE_IN_PALESTINE_JOURNAL_CHRISTIANITY_IN_THE_MIDDLE_EAST_2021_VOL_5_NO_3_pp_34_43
