= Stanislao Loffreda =

Italian biblical archaeologist (1932–2025)

The Rev. Stanislao Loffreda, O.F.M.
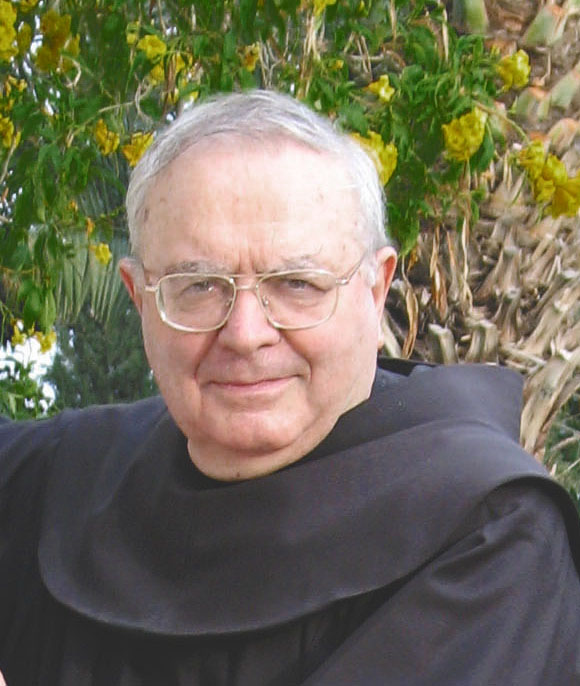
- Loffreda in 2007
- Born: 15 January 1932; Monteprandone, Italy
- Died: 9 August 2025 (aged 93); Ascoli Piceno, Italy
- Education: University of Chicago Oriental Institute
- Known for: Excavations at Capernaum, Machaerus, Herodium, Magdala and Tabgha
- Scientific career
- Fields: Archaeology, Ceramology and Biblical studies
- Workplaces: Studium Biblicum Franciscanum

Stanislao Loffreda, O.F.M. (15 January 1932 – 9 August 2025) was an Italian Franciscan friar, archaeologist, Palestinian pottery expert and Bible scholar.

He belonged to the Italian Province of S. Giacomo nelle Marche. He was ordained as a priest in the Order of Friars Minor in 1956. He was licentiate in Holy Scripture and laureate in theology with biblical specialization, M. A. in archaeology of the Oriental Institute of Chicago in 1967. He served as a professor of biblical archaeology and topography of Jerusalem and the director of Studium Biblicum Franciscanum in Jerusalem (1978–1990). In the years 1968–1991 he was a co-director of the excavations at Capernaum by the Sea of Galilee and in 1978–1981, on the hilltop palace of Machaerus in Jordan.

Loffreda died in Ascoli Piceno, Italy on 9 August 2025, at the age of 93.

== Bibliography ==
Father Loffreda was the author of several books on archeological and historical topics. A selection follows:

- Scavi di Et-Tabgha. Relazione finale della campagna di scavi 25 marzo - 20 giugno 1969 (1970)
- La sinagoga di Cafarnao dopo gli scavi del 1969: Estratto del Liber Annuus XX, 1970 (1970, with V. Corbo, A. Spijkerman)
- Cafarnao. II: La ceramica (1974)
- A visit to Capharnaum (1980)
- The sanctuaries of Tabgha (1981)
- Capernaum, Jesus own city (1981)
- Capharnaum: The town of Jesus (1985)
- Recovering Capharnaum (1985)
- Lucerne bizantine in Terra Santa con iscrizioni in greco (1989)
- La ceramica di Macheronte e dell'Herodion (90 a.C. - 135 d.C.) (1996)
- Light and life: Ancient Christian oil lamps of the Holy Land (2001)
- Padre Virgilio Corbo a dieci anni dalla morte : Testimonianza di un'amicizia (2001)
- Holy Land pottery at the time of Jesus : Early Roman period 63 BC-70 AD (2002)
- Cafarnao V : Documentazione fotografica degli scavi (1968-2003) (2005)
- Cafarnao VI: Tipologie e contesti stratigrafici della ceramica (1968-2003) (2008)
- Cafarnao VII: Documentazione grafica della ceramica (1968-2003) (2008)
- Cafarnao VIII: Documentazione fotografica degli oggetti (1968-2003) (2008)

== See also ==
- Virgilio Canio Corbo (1918–1991), Franciscan archaeologist
- Michele Piccirillo (1944–2008), Franciscan archaeologist
