= Studium Biblicum Franciscanum =

Franciscan society in Jerusalem

Coordinates: 31°46′50″N 35°14′01″E

Studium Biblicum Franciscanum (SBF), Latin for 'Franciscan Biblical Studies', is a Franciscan academic society based in Jerusalem. It is a center of biblical and archaeological research and studies, established by the Franciscan Custody of the Holy Land.

== Organization ==
In 1901, the Custody of the Holy Land started envisaging the creation of a biblical studies institute in Jerusalem, which led in 1924 to the establishment of the Studium Biblicum Franciscanum. The SBF is since 2001 the Faculty for Biblical Sciences and Archaeology of the Pontifical University Antonianum, the Franciscan university in Rome. Its main seat is the Flagellation Monastery in the Via Dolorosa in Jerusalem.

It has a branch in Hong Kong, founded in Beijing in 1945 by Blessed Gabriele Allegra, which produced the first complete translation of the Catholic Bible in Chinese in 1968 after a 40-year effort; the Studium Biblicum Translation is often considered the Chinese Bible among Catholics.

The Studium has good relationships with the Dominican École Biblique, also located in Jerusalem.

== Publications ==
The SBF publishes a number of scientific publications: the theological-archaeological journal Liber Annuus ISSN 0081-8933 with scientific articles in different languages, and the series "Collectio Maior", "Collectio Minor", "Analecta" and "Museum".

The SBF uses the services of the Franciscan Printing Press (est. 1847).

== Research and studies ==
The SBF offers two academic degrees, the Licentiate and the Doctorate in Biblical Sciences and Archaeology, a diploma in biblical-oriental sciences, a biblical diploma, and a philosophical-theological curriculum in the "Studium Theologicum Jerosolymitanum“. The language of teaching is Italian.

Fields of study and research are Old and New Testament exegesis, biblical and Christian history, biblical and Middle Eastern languages, and biblical archaeology with several excavations conducted by the SBF. The main discoveries are exhibited in a museum, including the oldest Georgian Bir el Qutt inscriptions.

The library contains appr. 50.000 volumes and 420 journals in the areas of archaeology, biblical studies, Christian and Jewish history, and ancient travel accounts of the Holy Land.

== Professors ==
Teaching staff

- Piotr Blajer OFM, New Testament exegesis
- Alessandro Cavicchia OFM, New Testament exegesis
- Elisa Chiorrini, Biblical Greek and Coptic
- Alessandro Coniglio OFM, Biblical Hebrew and Old Testament exegesis
- Yunus Demirci OFMCap, Biblical Archeology
- Gregor Geiger OFM, Semitic languages
- Massimo Luca OFM, Biblical Geography and excursions
- Matteo Munari OFM, New Testament exegesis and Targumic Aramaic
- Massimo Pazzini OFM, Biblical Hebrew and Syriac
- Rosario Pierri OFM, dean of the faculty, Biblical Greek
- Samuele Salvatori OFM, New Testament exegesis

Retired Professors

- Eugenio Alliata OFM
- Giovanni Bissoli OFM
- Giovanni Claudio Bottini OFM
- Alfio Marcello Buscemi OFM
- Stanislao Loffreda OFM (b. 1932)
- Tomislav Vuk OFM

Prominent Professors of the past

- Maurus Witzel OFM (1882–1969)
- Donato Baldi OFM (1888–1965)
- Gaudenzio Orfali OFM (1889–1926)
- Sylvester Saller OFM (1895–1976)
- Paulin Lemaire OFM (1896–1963)
- Bellarmino Bagatti OFM (1905–1990)
- Gabriele Allegra OFM (1907–1976)
- Virgilio Corbo OFM (1918–1991)
- Augustus Spijkerman OFM (1920–1973)
- Emanuele Testa OFM (1923–2011)
- Angelo Francesco Lancellotti OFM (1927–1984)
- Virginio Ravanelli OFM (1927–2014)
- Lino Cignelli OFM (1931–2010)
- Alviero Niccacci OFM (1940–2018)
- Frédéric Manns OFM (1942–2021)
- Michele Piccirillo OFM (1944–2008)
- Pietro Kaswalder OFM (1952–2014)
- Patriarch Pierbattista Pizzaballa OFM (1965–)
