= Birds Mosaic =

Birds Mosaic may refer to:

- Birds Mosaic (Caesarea)
- Birds Mosaic (Jerusalem)
