= Birds Mosaic (Caesarea) =

Byzantine floor mosaic

Coordinates: 32.5058°N 34.9033°E

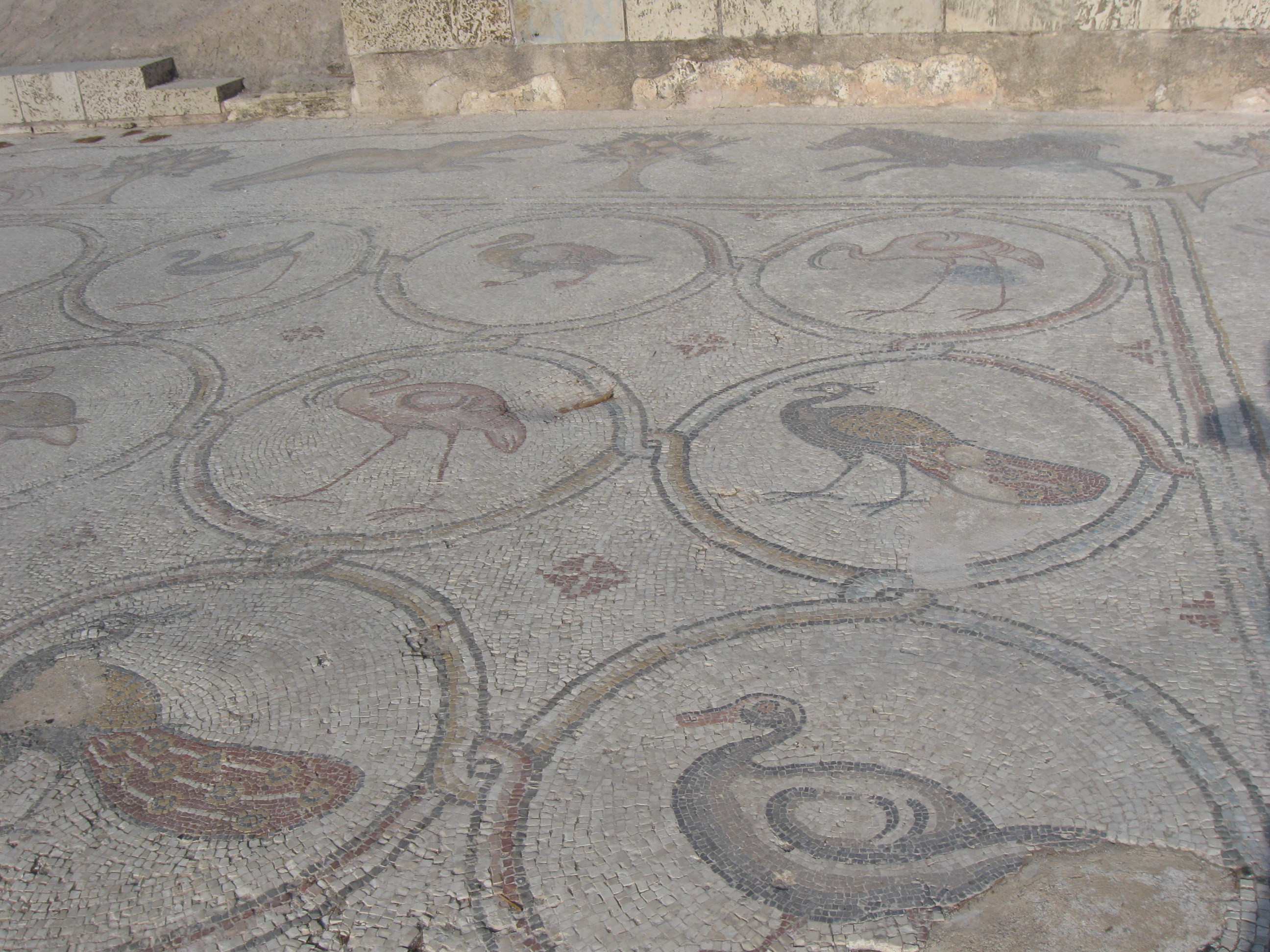
- Section of the mosaic
- Size: 16 meters x 14.5 meters
- Created: c. 6th century, AD
- Period/culture: Late Antiquity
- Discovered: 1950; Caesarea Maritima
- Culture: Byzantine

The Birds Mosaic is a Byzantine mosaic floor discovered in Caesarea Maritima, in modern Israel, in a Byzantine palace that was built around 600 AD. It is viewable in situ.

The mosaic covers an area of 16 by 14.5 meters. It includes a border or frame decorated with fruit trees bearing large and beautiful fruit. Between the trees are large mammals in states of movement. The mammals include lions, leopards, bears, ibex, dogs, elephants, gazelle, oxen, wild boar, horse, and goat. The central field of the mosaic (surrounded by the frame) consists of 120 round medallions populated by large colorful birds, which give the mosaic its name. The medallions form 12 rows, with different kinds of birds in each row - peacocks, storks, pelicans, herons, pheasants, grey-headed swamphen, duck, flamingo, guineafowl, ostrich, rock partridge - all of them facing to the left. The sequence of birds is such that the same species is repeated along a diagonal in the medallion array.

== History ==
The mosaic was discovered in 1950 during a military exercise, and after five years was covered in sand to prevent deterioration. Archaeologist Shmuel Yeivin was the first to publish about it, and described it as a church due to the apse located in the east of the building. Since no pillars were found, he proposed that the church was without a roof. But in 1985 archaeologist Ronny Reich concluded that the site was the central part of a villa, rather than a church.

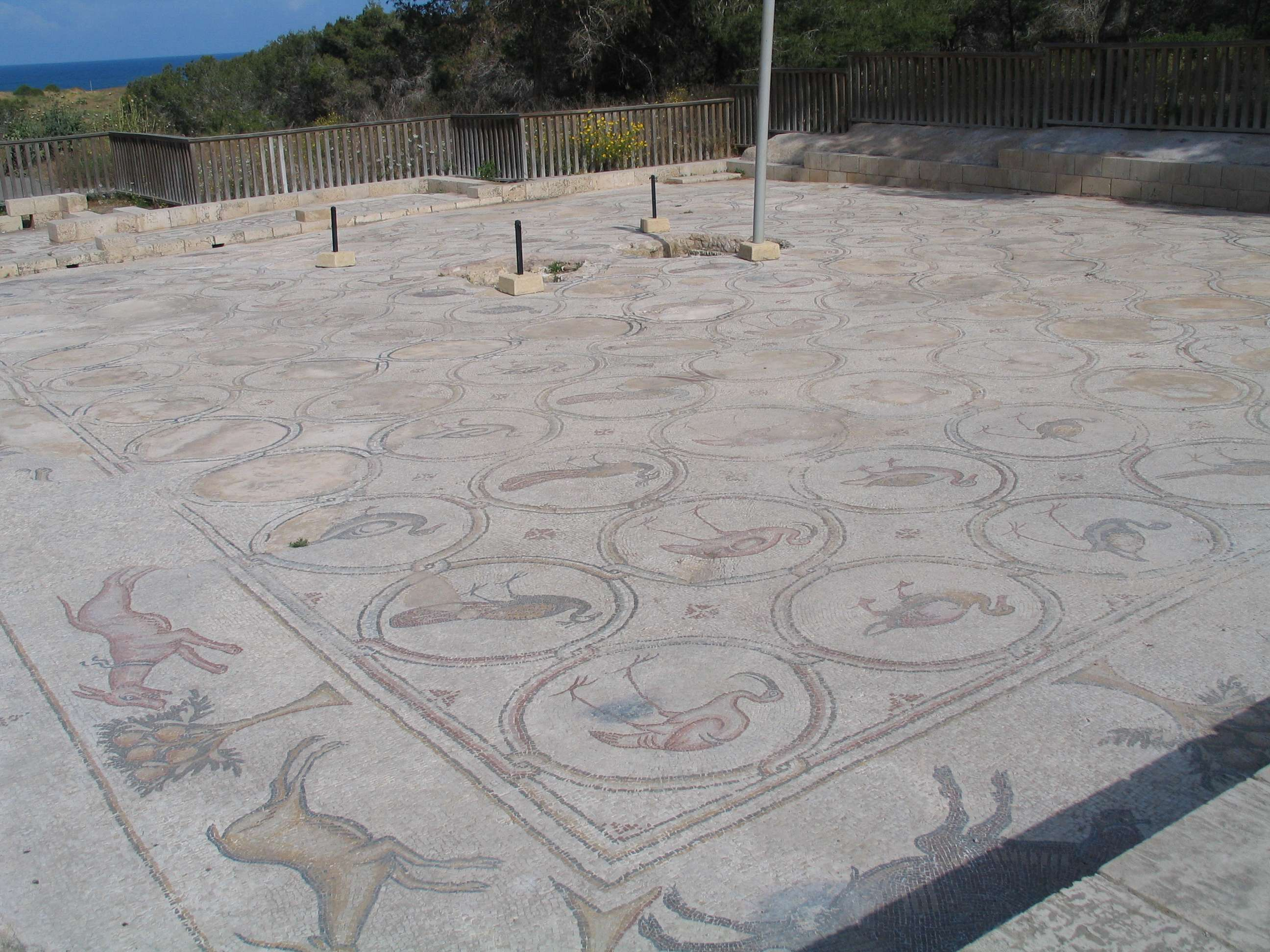
General view of mosaic

In 2004, the conservator Amir Genach, volunteers, the CDC and the Israel Antiquities Authority removed the 70 cm thick dirt layer covering the mosaic, restored and strengthened it, and prepared it for visitors. The site was opened to the public in October 2005. Entrance to the site is free, and it is possible to walk on the mosaic.

The mosaic floor belongs to a Byzantine palace that was built in the end of the 6th century or beginning of the 7th century, and which lay outside the walls of ancient Caesarea. The floor covered the atrium or central courtyard of the palace, which was led to by a portico on the west side. Surrounding it was a colonnade, rooms, and additional courtyards with mosaic floors. The built area of the palace was about 1500 square meters, and the entire settlement covered about 3 dunams. It belonged to a wealthy Christian family, but no indications of its identity have been found. The building had an additional storey which also had mosaic floors, parts of which collapsed when the palace was destroyed by fire, apparently during the Arab conquest in 640. The wooden beams of the second floor were burned, and parts of its mosaic were found on the floor of the first story.

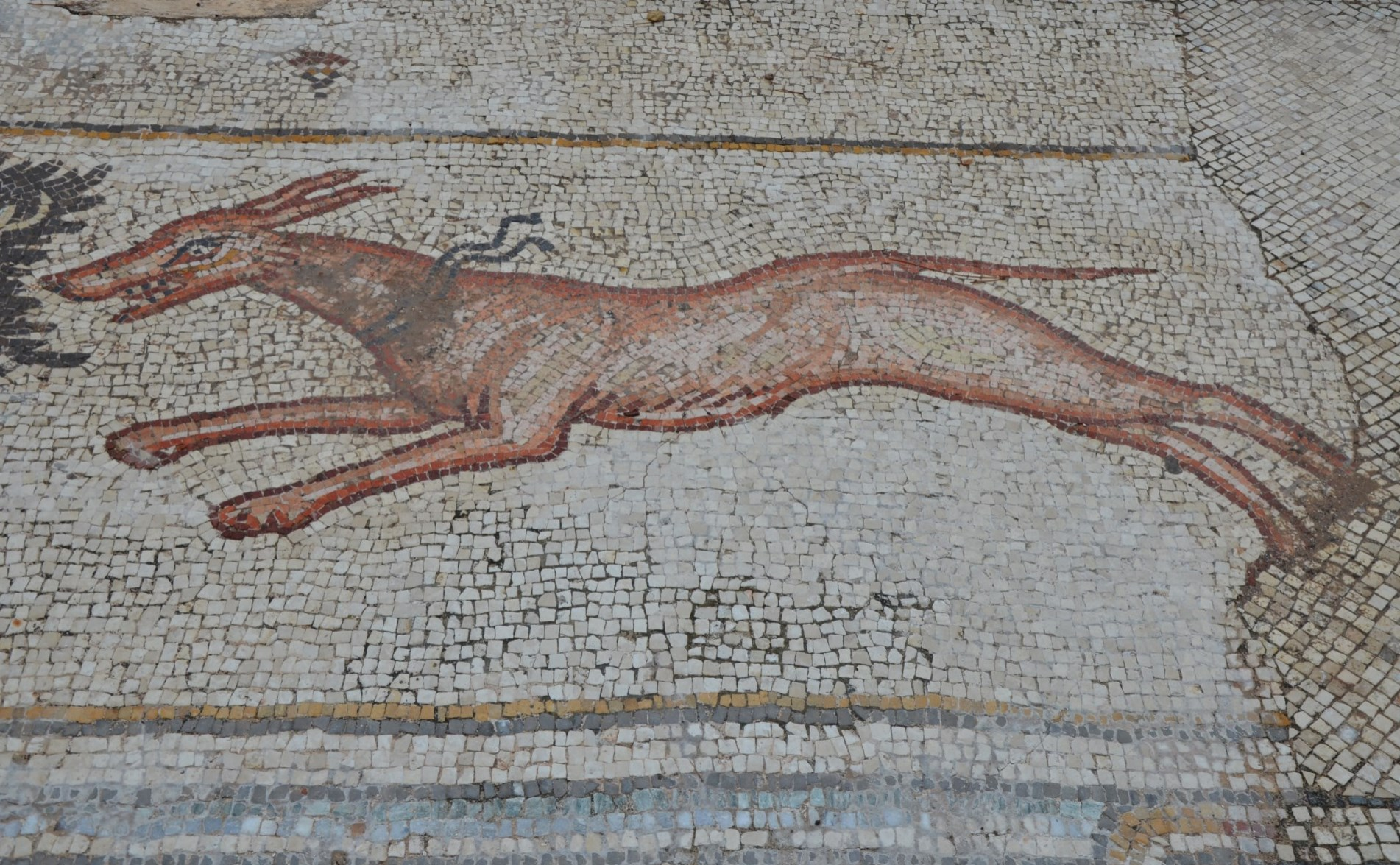
Dog, from the border

Under the mosaic is a plastered cistern, to which drained rainwater from the entire complex. In the northwest corner of the site was a reservoir which received its water from a well. The complex was too high to receive water from Caesarea's aqueduct, so it needed an independent water supply.

Another unique find at the site was a tabletop in the shape of the letter D, tiled with squares and triangles. The table was made with the "gold glass" method - two layers of glass with a gold layer between them, and figures of crosses and flowers in the gold layer. When the palace was burned, the table overturned and the wooden parts were burned, while the top was preserved on the floor. This tabletop was removed from the site for preservation.

== See also ==
- Birds Mosaic (Jerusalem)
- Archaeology of Israel

== External sources ==
- R. Reich, A Figurative Mosaic from Caesarea, in: R. Reich, Some Byzantine remains, 'Atiqot (English Series) 17 (1986), pp. 205-213
- Gold Glass Table from Caesarea
