= Early Byzantine mosaics in the Middle East =

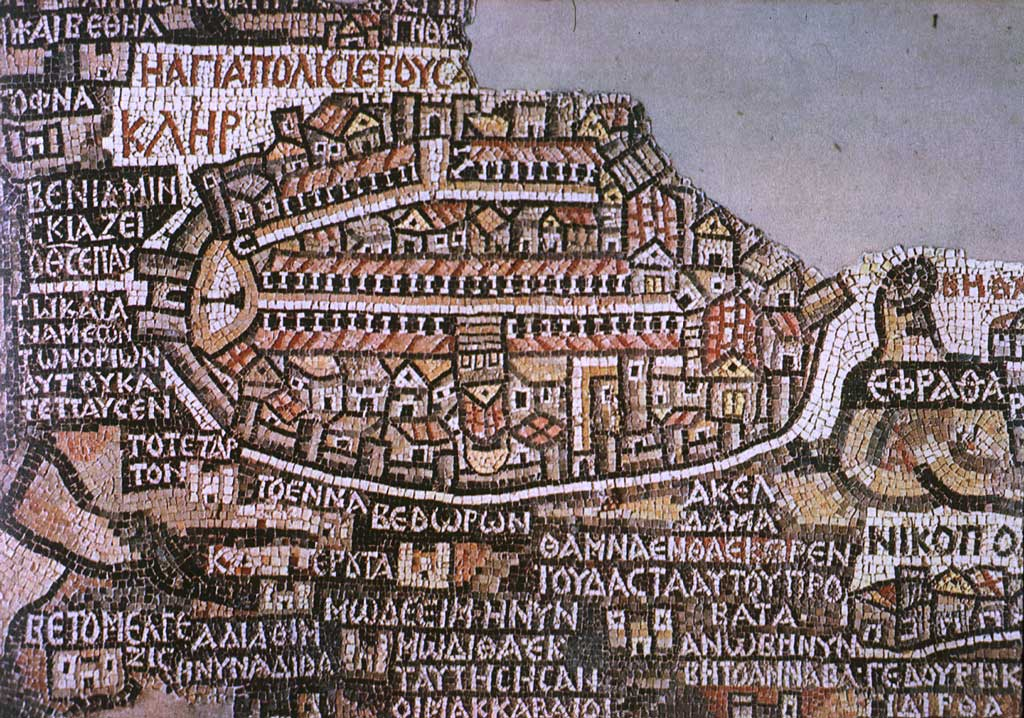
Depiction of Jerusalem on the Madaba Map, a floor mosaic of a church in modern-day Jordan

Early Byzantine mosaics in the Middle East are a group of Christian mosaics created between the 4th and the 8th centuries in ancient Syria, Israel, Palestine, Transjordan and Egypt when the area belonged to the Byzantine Empire. The eastern provinces of the Eastern Roman Empire and its continuation, the Byzantine Empire, inherited a strong artistic tradition from pagan Late Antiquity. The tradition of making mosaics was carried on in the Umayyad era until the end of the 8th century. The great majority of these works of art were later destroyed but archeological excavations unearthed many surviving examples.

== The Holy Land (Israel/Palestine) ==
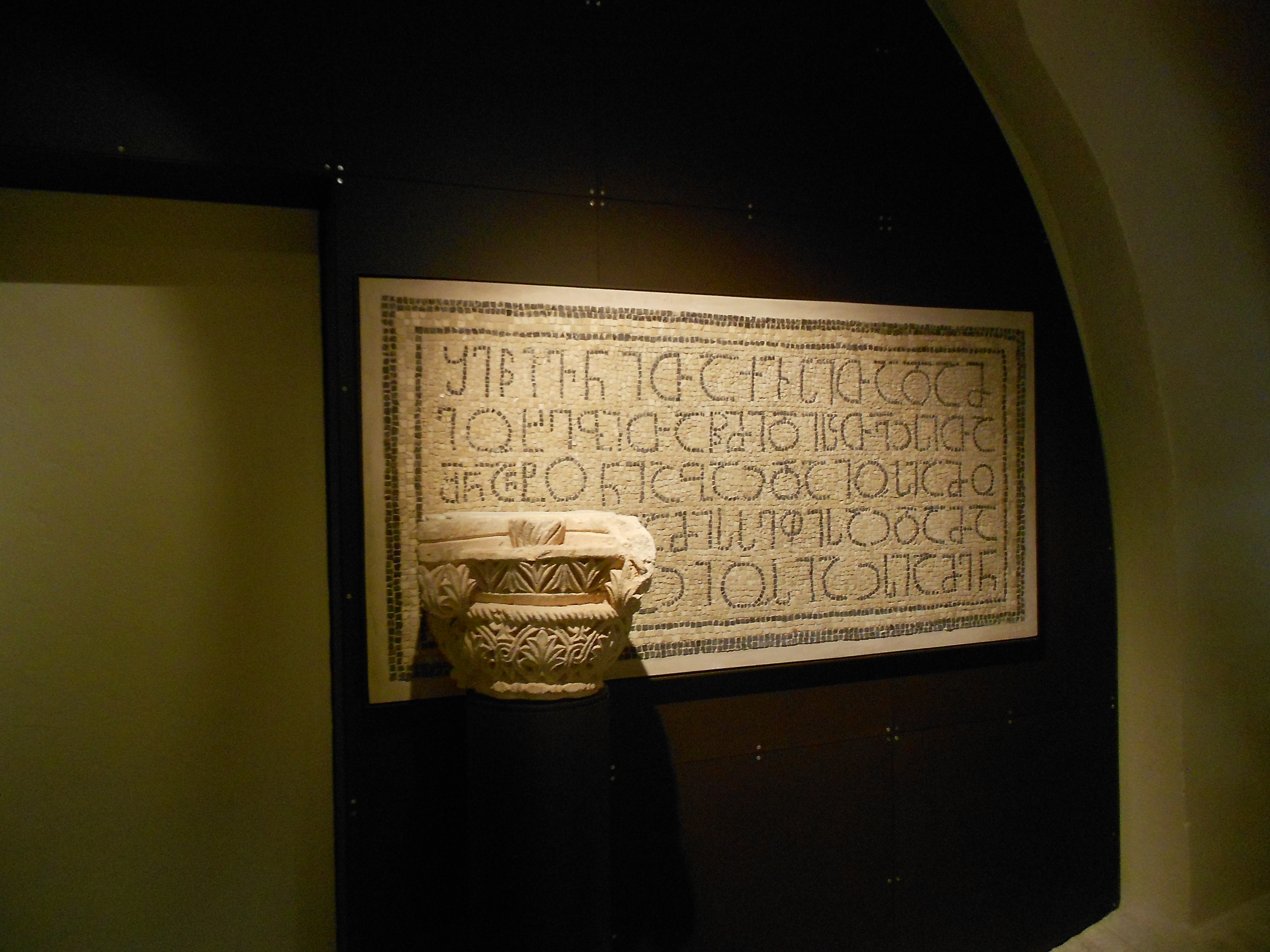
Georgian inscription from Bir el Qutt on a Byzantine mosaic floor.

=== Jerusalem, Judaean hill country and Shephelah ===
Jerusalem with its many holy places probably had the highest concentration of mosaic-covered churches but very few of them survived the subsequent waves of destructions. The present remains do not do justice to the original richness of the city. The most important is the Birds Mosaic, popularly known as the "Armenian Mosaic", which was discovered in 1894 near the Damascus Gate. It depicts a vine with many branches and grape clusters, which springs from a vase. Populating the vine's branches are peacocks, ducks, storks, pigeons, an eagle, a partridge, and a parrot in a cage. The inscription reads: "For the memory and salvation of all those Armenians whose name the Lord knows." The symbolism of the mosaic indicates that the room was used to remember the dead as a mortuary chapel.

On 2017, during a salvage excavation ahead of telephone cable infrastructure placement, archaeologists uncovered a rare Greek mosaic, about a kilometer north of the Old City on a road leading to the Damascus Gate. The inscription on the mosaic reads, "In the time of our most pious emperor Flavius Justinian, also this entire building Constantine the most God-loving priest and abbot, established and raised, in the 14th indiction." Archeologists called the find "extremely exciting," saying that "it's not every day that one finds an inscription — a 'direct letter' from someone — from 1,500 years ago." The word "indiction," is an ancient method of counting years for taxation purposes. Based on historical sources, the mosaic can be dated to the year 550/551 CE.

In the Dominus Flevit Church on the Mount of Olives, a 7th-century Byzantine chapel was unearthed in 1955. The floor is richly decorated with intersecting circles and pictures of fruit, leaves, flowers, and fish. A Greek inscription mentions Simon, who "decorated this place of prayer in honor of Jesus".

In the nearby Church of the Agony (built originally in the last decades of the 4th century) a colorful mosaic floor was discovered in 1920 which follows a geometric design.

Fragments of a similar geometric mosaic floor were preserved in the Basilica of St. Stephen (outside the Damascus Gate) which was built by Empress Aelia Eudocia in the first half of the 5th century.

On the outskirts of modern Jerusalem, in the Monastery of the Cross, a section of the elaborate 5th century mosaic floor survived, incorporating pictures of peacocks, plants and geometric patterns.

Early Byzantine mosaics were preserved in the Church of John the Baptist in Ein Kerem, the Beit Jimal Monastery (in the 5th century the Church of the Tomb of St. Stephen, mosaics discovered in 1916), the Church of the Seat of Mary (Kathisma) (from the 5-8th centuries, floral and geometric designs, cornucopiae, discovered in 1992–7) and the lower church at Shepherds' Field (or Beit Sahour, the Greek Orthodox site, a floor including crosses, and therefore must predate 427).

An exceptionally well preserved, carpet-like mosaic floor was uncovered in 1949 in Bethany, at the early Byzantine church of the Lazarium, which was built between 333 and 390. Because of its purely geometrical pattern, the church floor is to be grouped with other mosaics of the time in Palestine and neighboring areas, especially the Constantinian mosaics in the central nave at Bethlehem. A second church was built above the older one during the 6th century with another more simple geometric mosaic floor.

In 2003, during the construction works of the Israeli West Bank barrier in Abu Dis, workers damaged the remains of a Byzantine monastery, which was subsequently excavated. The monastery church had an elaborate mosaic floor decorated with images of animals including a deer and an octopus.

Ruins of three Byzantine churches were discovered in the village of Bayt Jibrin (ancient Eleutheropolis). One was decorated with an exquisite mosaic depicting the four seasons, but it was defaced during the 1948 Arab-Israeli War. The other church north of the wadi was excavated in 1941–1942. Its floor mosaic has octagons with representations of birds, quadrupeds, and scenes from the story of Jonah depicting the prophet being thrown out of the boat or resting.

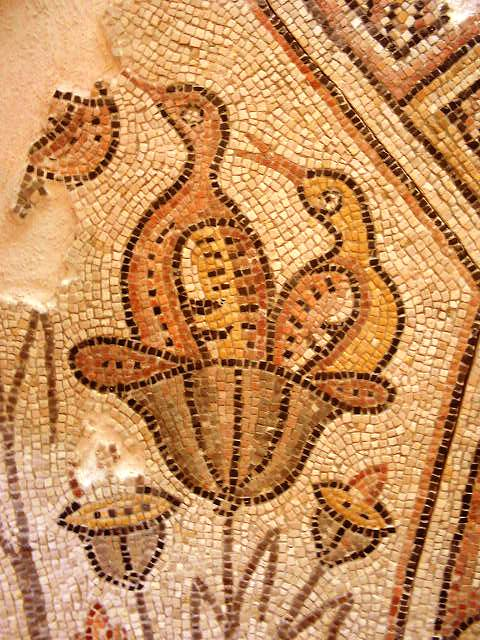
Detail of the mosaic floor from the church of Emmaus Nicopolis

In nearby Emmaus Nicopolis, two Byzantine basilicas were built in the 6-7th centuries above the traditional house of Cleopas, which was venerated by Christians as the place of the breaking of bread by the risen Christ. Both were decorated with mosaic floors. In the northern nave of the southern basilica, a nilotic mosaic portrayed birds, animals and flowers. In Abu Ghosh a 5th-century mosaic floor was preserved in the modern Church of the Ark of the Covenant.

In 1995-99 two large Byzantine churches were discovered in Khirbet Yattir (ancient Iethira) in the southern part of the Judean hills, close to the northern Negev. They belonged to monastic communities and were paved with beautiful mosaics in the 6-7th centuries. Two phases can be distinguished in the mosaic floor of Church C. The earlier was decorated with four birds and medallions of vines while the later one was divided into 23 strips which contain magical symbols and holy names. The dedicatory inscription dates this mosaic to the year 631/32.

=== Judean Desert ===
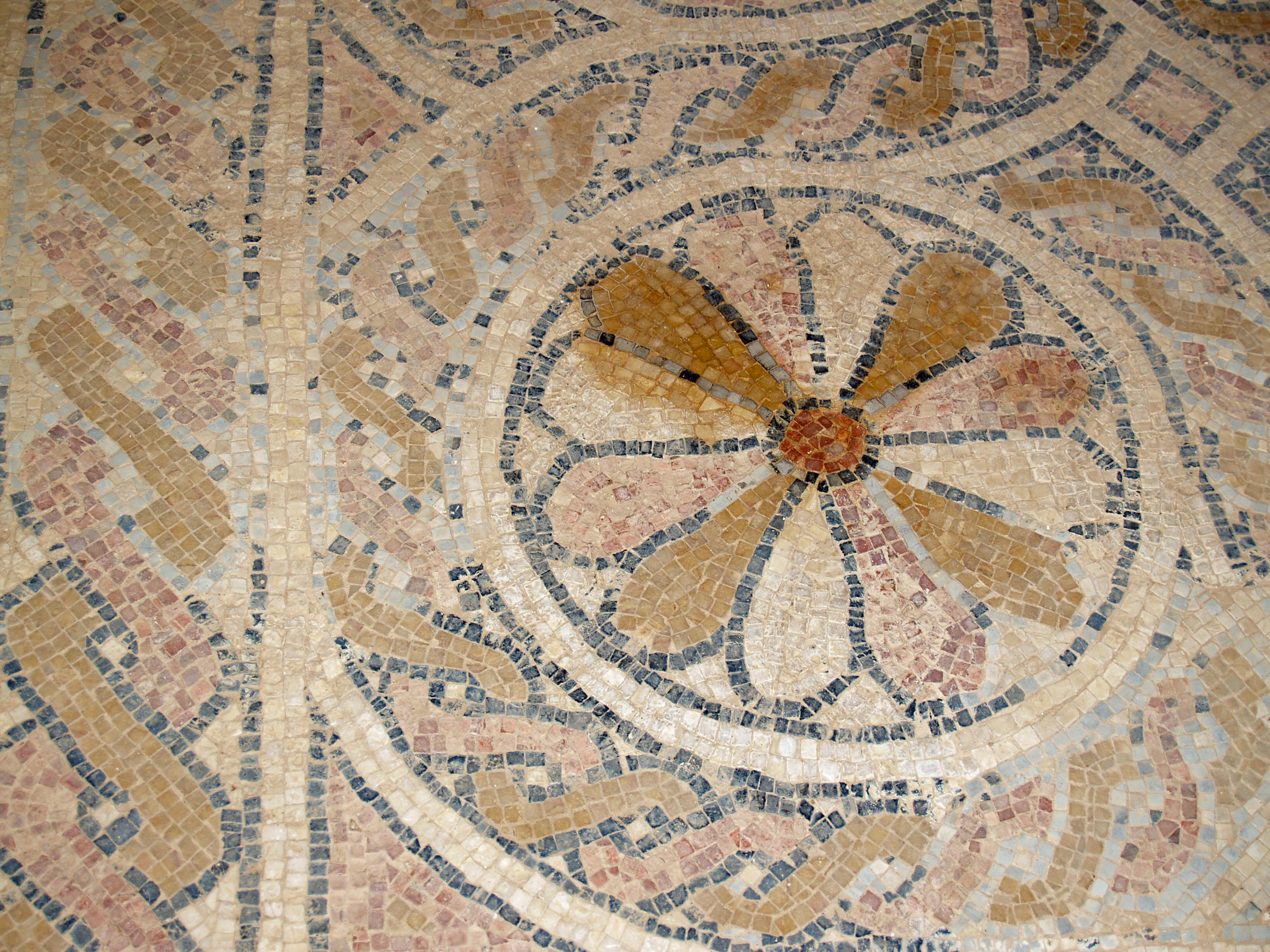
Detail from the mosaic floor of the Byzantine church of in Masada. The monastic community lived here in the 5-7th centuries.

The monastic communities and towns of the Judean Desert also decorated their churches and monasteries with mosaic floors. From the Byzantine-period perspective, the west side of the lower Jordan Valley near Jericho was included in the same region, although geographically it can be regarded as separate.

The Monastery of Martyrius was founded in the end of the 5th century and it was re-discovered in 1982–85. The most important work of art here is the intact geometric mosaic floor of the refectory although the severely damaged church floor was similarly rich.

The mosaics in the church of the nearby Monastery of Euthymius are of later date (discovered in 1930). They were laid down in the Umayyad era, after a devastating earthquake in 659. Two six pointed stars and a red chalice are the most important surviving features. The church floor was later replaced with rough opus sectile (probably by the Crusaders).

At Archelais (now Khirbet el-Beiyudat), on the west bank of the lower Jordan Valley, a Byzantine church was paved with mosaics during the 560s, as stated in votive inscriptions.

=== Transjordan with Madaba ===
==== Madaba ====
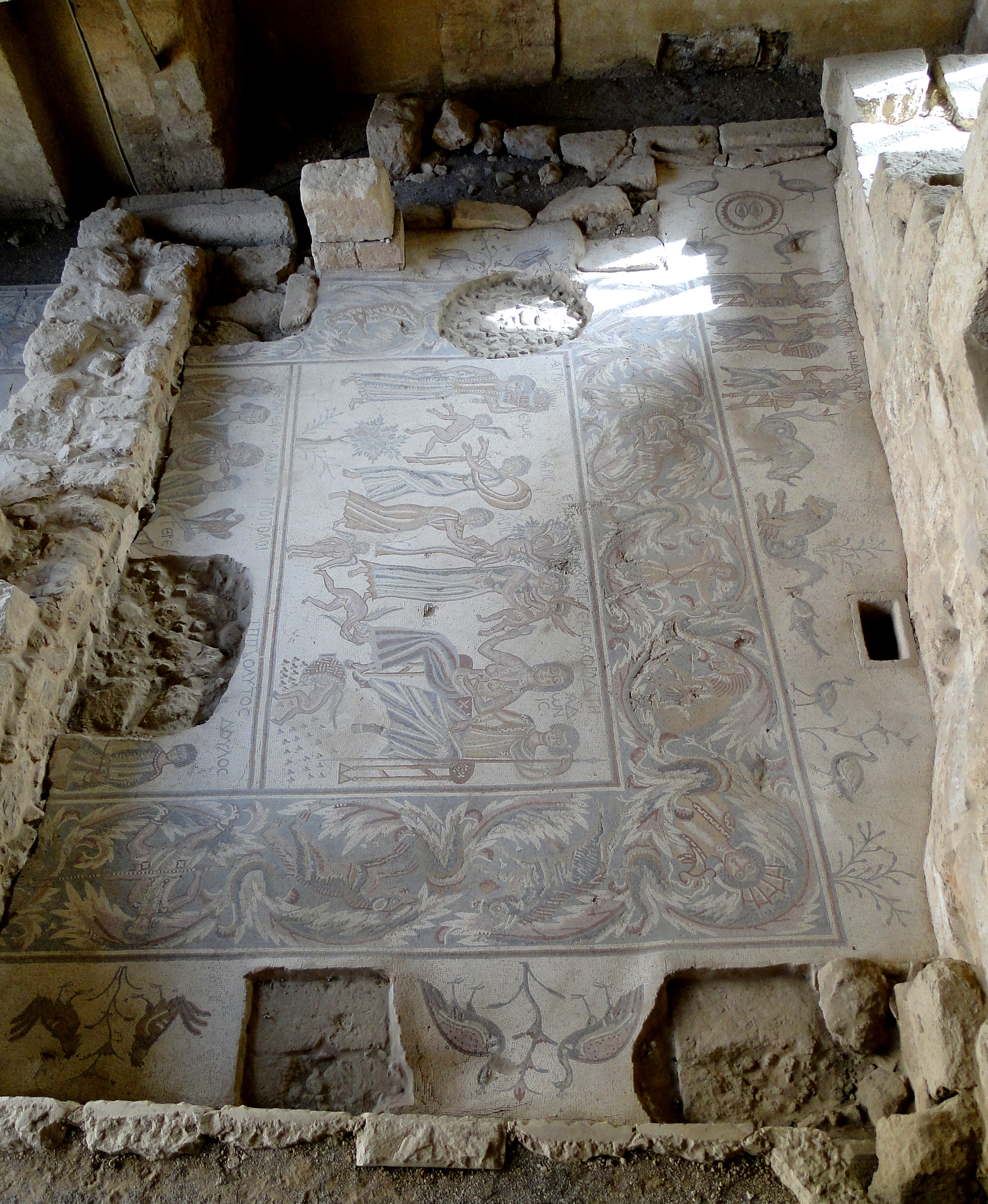
Upper part of Hippolytus mosaic in Madaba

The single most important piece of Byzantine Christian mosaic art in the East is the Madaba Map, made between 542 and 570 as the floor of the church of Saint George at Madaba, Jordan. It was rediscovered in 1894. The Madaba Map is the oldest surviving cartographic depiction of the Holy Land. It depicts an area from Lebanon in the north to the Nile Delta in the south, and from the Mediterranean Sea in the west to the Eastern Desert. The largest and most detailed element of the topographic depiction is Jerusalem, at the center of the map. The map is enriched with many naturalistic features, like animals, fishing boats, bridges and palm trees.

The town of Madaba remained an important center of mosaic making during the 5-8th centuries. In the Church of the Apostles even the name of the master mosaicist, Salomios was also recorded (from 568). In the middle of the main panel Thalassa, goddess of the sea, can be seen surrounded by fishes and other sea creatures. Native Middle Eastern birds, mammals, plants and fruits were also added. The Church of Prophet Elijah was built in 607. Its carpet-like central panel in the nave framed by a row of medaillons depicting native animals. Mosaic was used as a decoration not only for churches but for rich private residences like the Hippolytos Hall and the Burnt Palace (both from the early 6th century). They follow the classical Greco-Roman tradition with mythological and allegorical scenes like the Four Seasons, Phaedra and Hippolytos, Venus and Adonis, the Three Graces and the city goddesses of Madaba, Rome and Gregoria (in the Hippolytos Hall); hunting scenes, fight of a bull and a lion (in the Burnt Palace).

==== Mount Nebo ====
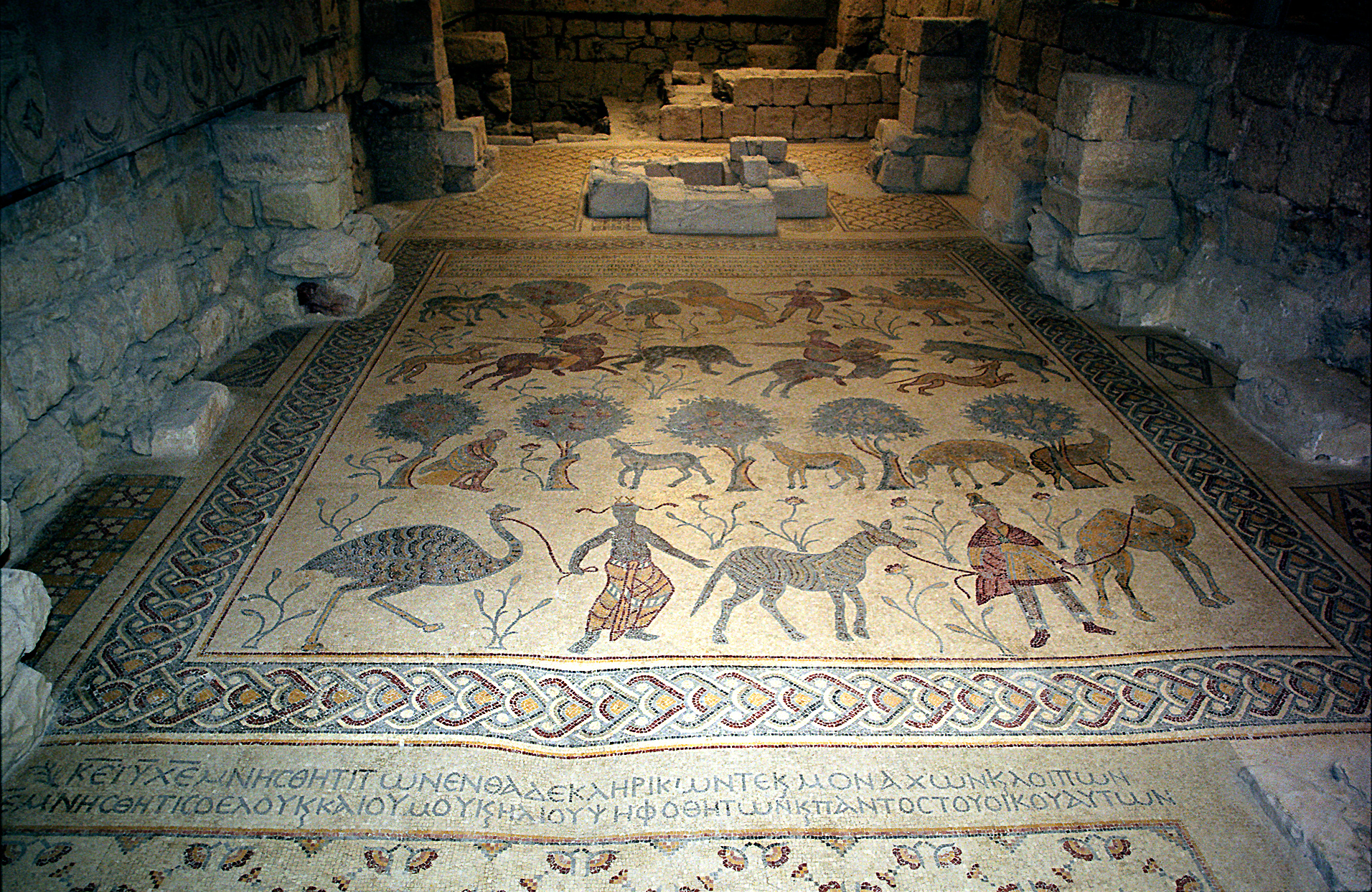
Mosaic floor from the church on Mount Nebo (baptistery, 530)

One of the earliest examples of Byzantine mosaic art in the region can be found on Mount Nebo, a place of pilgrimage in the Byzantine era where Moses died. Among the many 6th century mosaics in the church complex in an area known as Siyagha (discovered after 1933) the most interesting one is located in the baptistery. The intact floor mosaic in the Byzantine monastery, built on the foundations of an even earlier chapel from the third or fourth century CE, was laid down in circa 530. It covers an area of 9 x 3 m and depicts the monastic pastime of wine-making, as well as hunters, with a rich assortment of Middle Eastern flora and fauna.

The Church of Sts. Lot and Procopius was founded in 567 in Nebo village under Mount Nebo (now Khirbet al-Mukhayyat). Its floor mosaic depicts everyday activities like grape harvest. Another two spectacular mosaics were discovered in the ruined Church of Preacher John nearby. One of the mosaics was placed above the other one which was completely covered and unknown until the modern restoration. The figures on the older mosaic have thus escaped the iconoclasts.

==== Tell Mar Elias ====
The early 7th-century church complex of Tell Mar Elias, the birthplace of Prophet Elijah, (in present-day Jordan, near Ajlun) was discovered in 1999. The floor of the cruciform main church is decorated with wonderfully intact, multi-colored mosaics with floral and geometric motifs (flowers, leaves, scrolls, braided patterns, amphorae) without any representations of animals or humans. One large mosaic floor inscription in white letters on a red background says that the presbyter Saba and his wife offered the church to God as an expression of their faith, in the year 622.

==== Baptism site ====
Another holy place, Bethany Beyond the Jordan (Al Maghtas), the scene of the baptism of Jesus, was excavated after 1994. Floor mosaics were discovered in the 5-6th century Church of the Arch, the Church of the Trinity and also the 5th century Rhotorios Monastery (with Greek inscriptions). The floor here was covered by a colored mosaic with a frame and cross marks depicted with geometrical designs.

==== Lot's Cave ====
The monastic complex above Lot's Cave (near the southern end of the Dead Sea), which was uncovered after 1988, contained five mosaics, one dated April 606, another May 691.

==== Esbus ====
Another important mosaic site around Madaba is ancient Esbus, present-day Tell Hesban where two Byzantine churches have been discovered. Both churches produced impressive remains of mosaic floors which is not surprising given the fact that Esbus was an ecclesiastical center with its own bishop. Particularly interesting is the nilotic mosaic of the presbytery of the North Church where the mosaicists have created a motif of a turtledove set on a nest made of an imaginary flower.

==== Ma'in and Massuh ====
Christian mosaics were also discovered in other settlements in the surroundings of Madaba like Ma'in and Massuh, testifying the widespread popularity of the craft in Byzantine times and the importance of the Madaba area as an artistic center. The church at Massuh has two layers of floor mosaics. The lower one, from the 6th century, has no iconoclastic damage, while the upper layer, from the 7th century, was systematically altered by iconoclasts. Figures were carefully replaced by crosses, or floral and architectural motifs.

=== Samaria ===
The most important Byzantine mosaics in Samaria were discovered in Shilo, where three basilicas were uncovered. The large mosaic floor of the Church of the Ark (completed in 420, re-discovered in 2006) contains geometric designs, flora representations and three Greek inscriptions, among them a salute to the residents of Seilun (Shilo).

=== Galilee wider region ===
Two mosaic sites were discovered in the vicinity of modern-day Nahariya in Western Galilee. One that now belongs to moshav Shavei Tzion was a 5-6th-century church that stood immediately on the seashore. The main motifs of its carpet-like, decorative floor are red swastikas on white background. The other church is located on a hill called Khirbet Ittaim. The tri-apsidal basilica was built in 555 by the bishop of Tyre and was destroyed in 614 by the Persians. The remarkable mosaic floor has figurative scenes like a hunter attacking a tiger in the south apse, a man with a horse, a sitting man playing a flute and two beautiful peacocks drinking from the fountain of life.

In 1940 a 6th-century Byzantine church was discovered in present-day Hanita. Among the mainly decorative motifs of its mosaic floor there are two animal scenes: a boar grazing on a field and a hare eating grapes (the latter is very uncommon). Both are considered a symbol of redemption.

The mosaic decoration of the Church of the Annunciation in Nazareth, which was one of the great Constantinian basilicas of the Holy Land, was totally destroyed during the centuries together with much of the basilica. Archeological evidences prove that prior to the mid-4th century another small church stood on the site. A mosaic inscription referring to Deacon Conon survived of this building. The existence of a large Byzantine church on the site of the present-day Sisters of Nazareth Convent from Nazareth was proven in 2006–2007. This church was architecturally complex and elaborately decorated, it was floored with polychrome mosaic (of which only very scant remains survived) and also had polychrome wall mosaics. Further mosaic-floored Byzantine buildings were located to the south of the church. This evidence indicates that Byzantine Nazareth contained two large churches dominating its centre, with other mosaic-floored and colonnaded masonry structures around them. As such the town had to be an important Byzantine pilgrimage centre.

On the top of nearby Mount Tabor which was venerated as the place of the Transfiguration of Christ another great church was built before 422. A small portion of its mosaic floor survived.

The Monastery of Lady Mary near Bet She'an was established in 567. Many rooms and the church itself was decorated with mosaic among them a great zodiac, a circle of 12 figures representing the months, with the sun god Helios and the moon goddess Selene in the centre. Similar mosaic zodiacs were found in contemporary Jewish synagogues. Other mosaics represent vine tendrils, hunters, animals and birds.

There is a 5th-century church located at Kursi on the eastern shore of the Sea of Galilee. The site is connected with the biblical Gergesa as the location where Jesus cast a legion of demons from a possessed person. The mosaics visible today include geometric patterns, birds, cucumbers, gourds, melons, and grape clusters.

=== Mediterranean coast ===
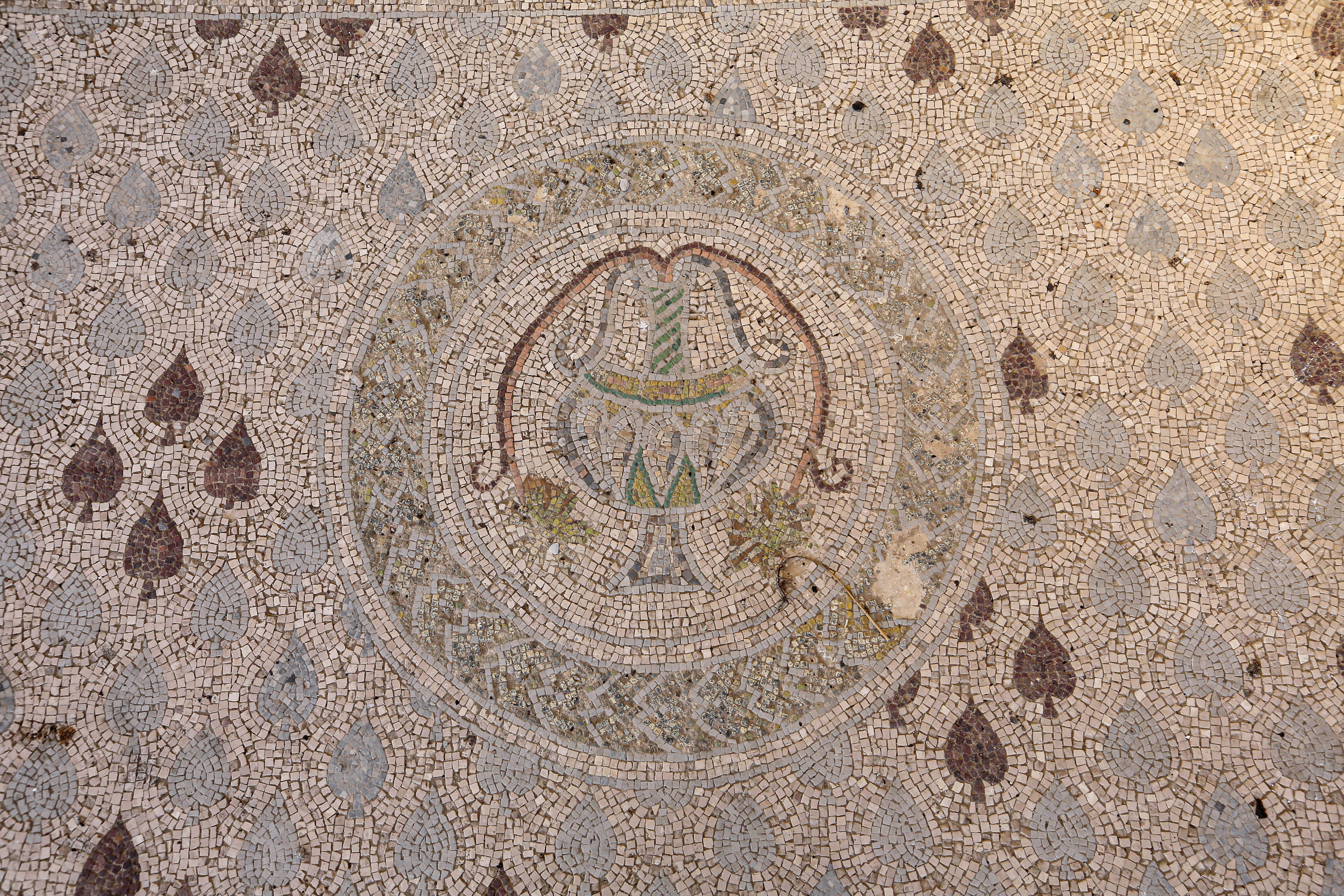
6th-century Byzantine mosaic from Tell Umm el-'Amr in the Gaza Strip, Palestine

Several mosaics were discovered around Gaza which was an important centre of Christianity during the Byzantine era. The most publicized of these discoveries were made in 1917 by Australian troops fighting against the Ottomans at Shellal. The church stood upon a small hill above Wadi Guzze and has an elaborate floor decorated exotic animals in medallions and two beautiful peacocks. It was dated to 561–562 and it is regarded an extraordinary piece of Justinian era mosaic art. A lesser known mosaic of a church was also uncovered during military operations in the summer of 1917 at Umm Jerar, south of Gaza. Two floors have many similarities in design.

In the Barnea district of the port of Ashkelon two large Byzantine churches were unearthed. In the first only the remains of glass tesserae prove that its walls were decorated with mosaics while in the other one an almost intact geometric floor survived with three inscriptions dating to years 493 and 498.

=== Negev desert ===
Mosaic covered churches prove that the towns along the Nabatean spice road in the Negev Desert flourished in the Christian era. In Mamshit two great churches survived. The Eastern Church (or Church of the Martyrs) was probably built in the late 4th century and has a geometric floor with crosses. The mosaics of the Western (or Nile) Church are more elaborate depicting birds, fruit basket, swastikas and flowers. An inscription in a medallion reads: "God, save your servant Nilus, lover of Jesus, who founded this building. Preserve him and his household."

== Petra ==
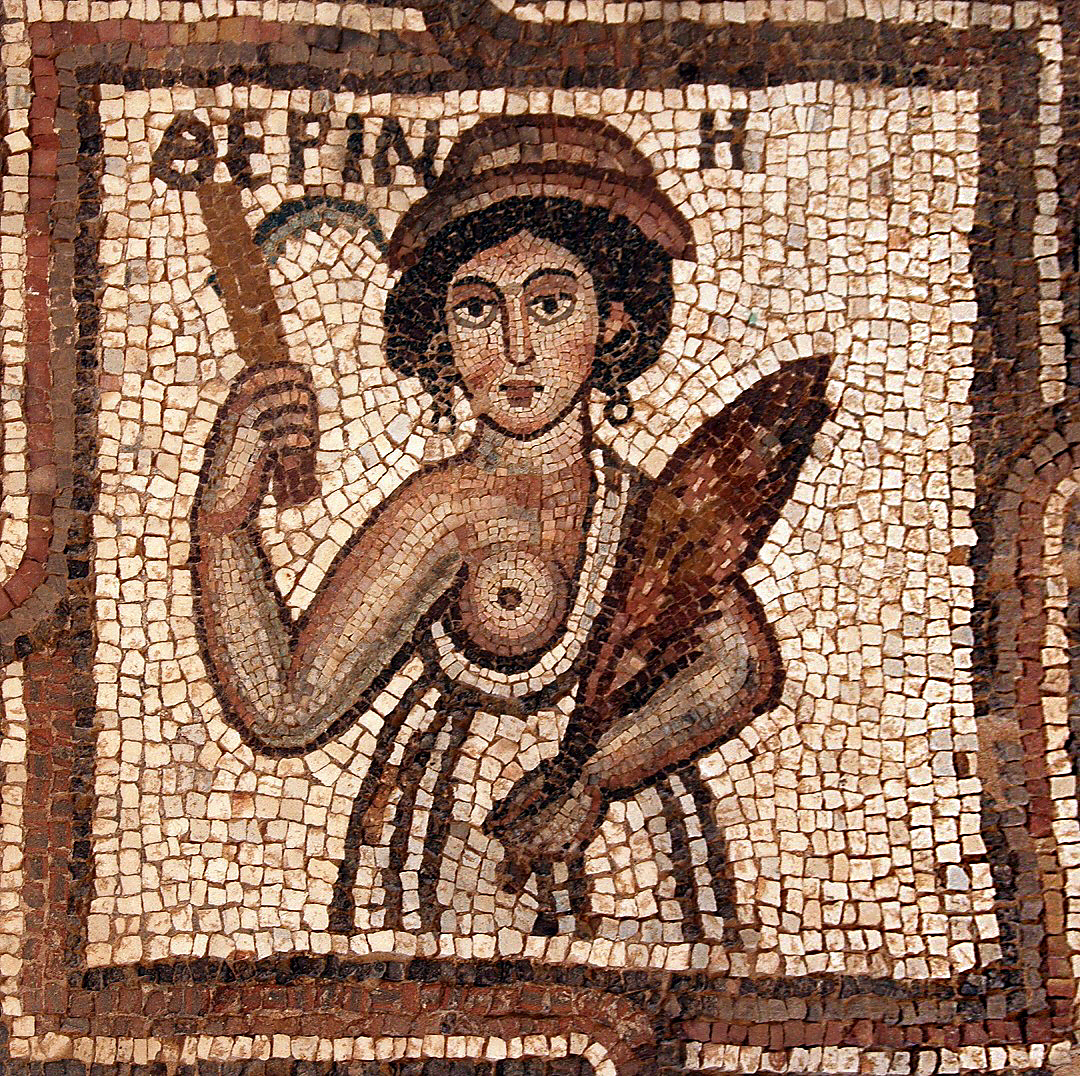
Detail from the mosaic floor of the Petra Church

Mosaic art also flourished in Christian Petra where three Byzantine churches were discovered. The most important one was uncovered in 1990. It is known that the walls were also covered with golden glass mosaics but only the floor panels survived as usual. The mosaic of the seasons in the southern aisle is from this first building period from the middle of the 5th century. In the first half of the 6th century the mosaics of the northern aisle and the eastern end of the southern aisle were installed. They depict native as well as exotic or mythological animals, and personifications of the Seasons, Ocean, Earth and Wisdom.

== Sinai ==
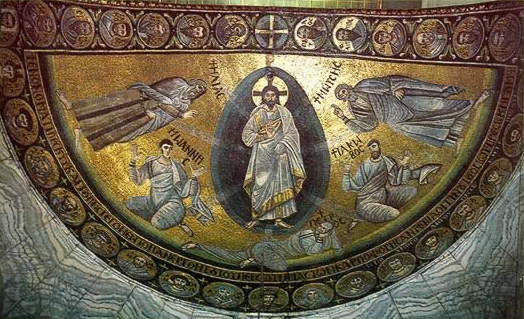
The Transfiguration of Jesus in the Saint Catherine's Monastery

Important Justinianic era mosaics decorated the Saint Catherine's Monastery on Mount Sinai. Generally wall mosaics have not survived in the region because of the destruction of buildings but the St. Catherine's Monastery is exceptional. On the upper wall Moses is shown in two panels on a landscape background. In the apse we can see the Transfiguration of Jesus on a golden background. The apse is surrounded with bands containing medallions of apostles and prophets, and two contemporary figure, "Abbot Longinos" and "John the Deacon". The mosaic was probably created in 565/6.

== Lebanon ==
As part of the ancient region of Syria, present-day Lebanon shared the same great tradition in Roman and Byzantine mosaic art as neighbouring areas. In the recent past many important finds were brought to light in cities and churches all over the country. An important Byzantine mosaic collection was established in Beiteddine Palace, mostly from discoveries in the coastal town of Jiyyeh (ancient Porphyrion). They date from the 5-6th centuries. The designs are often geometric and stylized but there are also interesting depictions of animals, including leopards, gazelles, lions, hares and birds, as well as religious figures.

A big geometric mosaic floor was unearthed in the Church of St John the Baptist in Byblos.

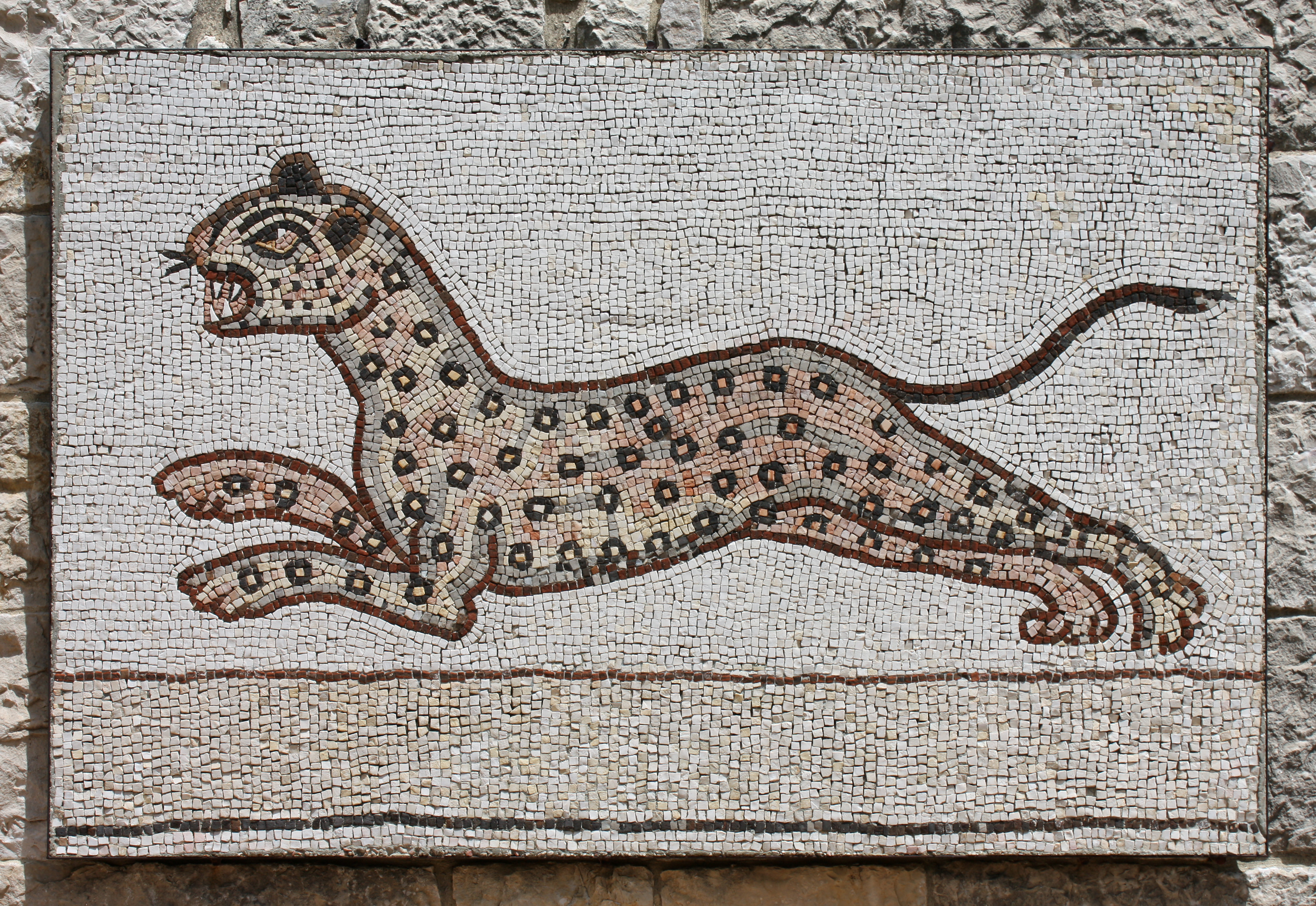
Fifth-century mosaic of a leopard at Beiteddine Palace.

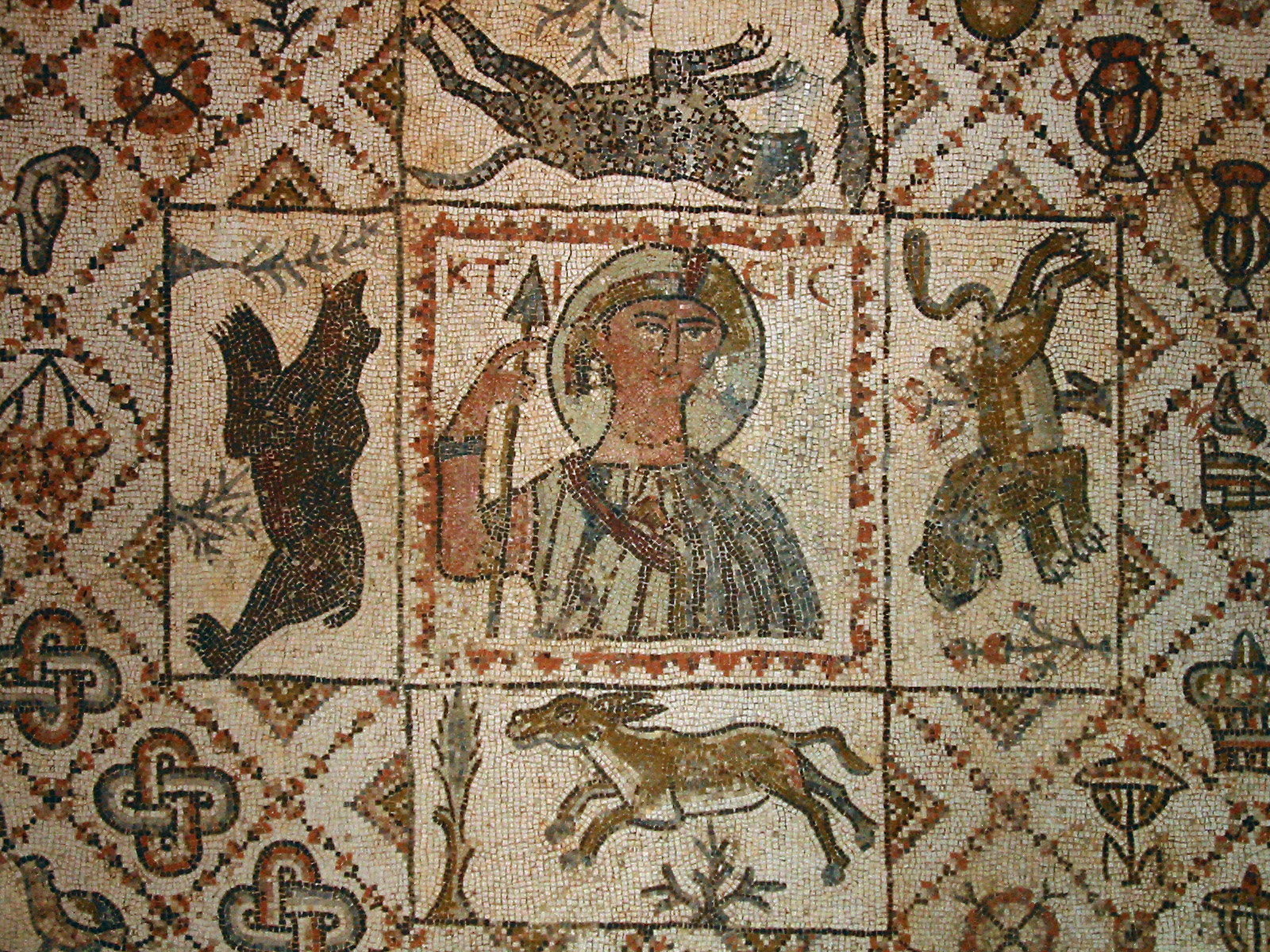
Fifth- or sixth-century mosaic: personification of "Ktisis" ("creation" or "construction, building") at Beiteddine Palace.

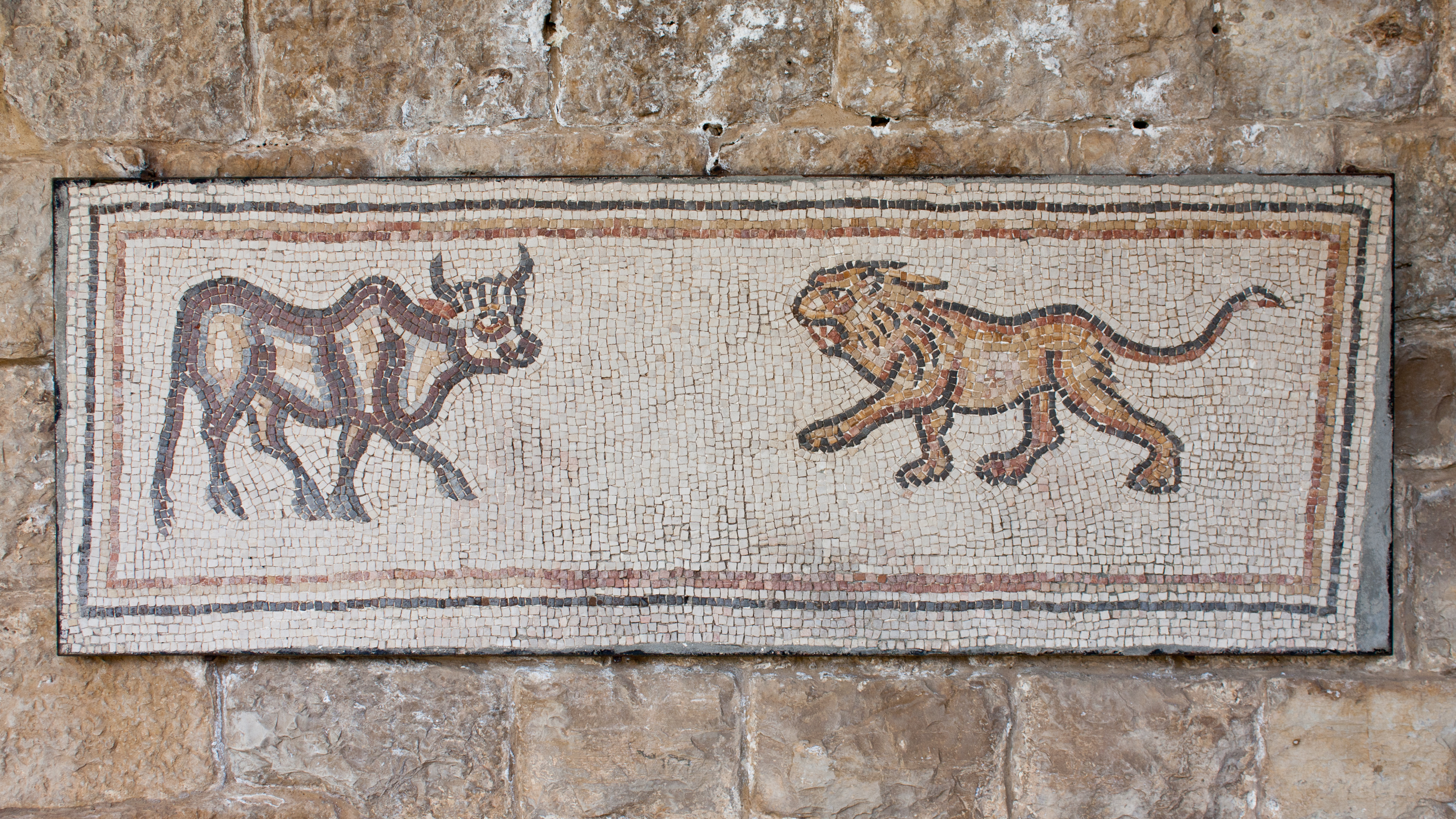
Fifth-century mosaic of a bull and a lion at Beiteddine Palace.

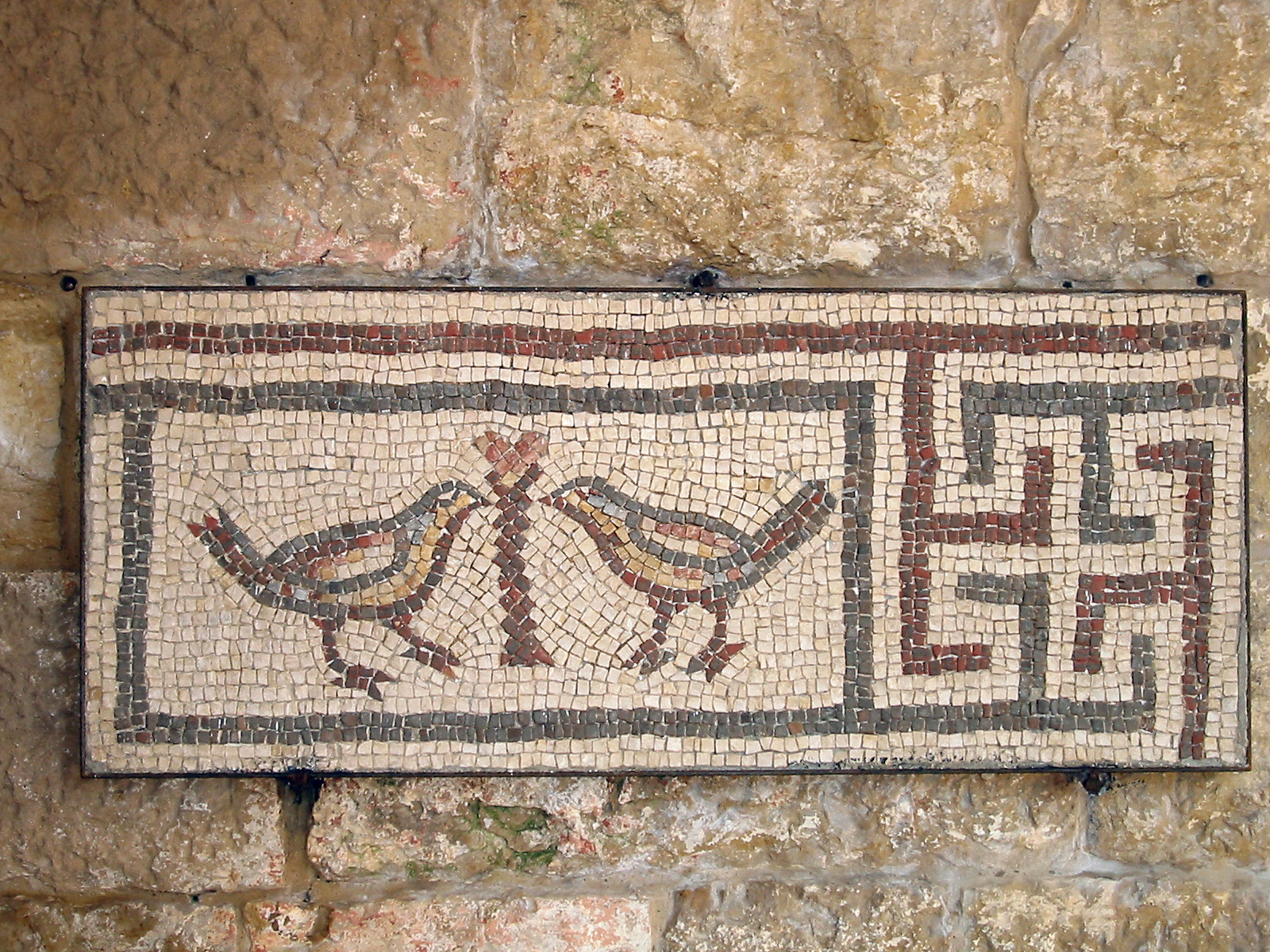
Fifth-century mosaic of two doves and a swastika at Beiteddine Palace.

== Syria ==
Syria had a high status during the Byzantine period, when many of its cities had schools of mosaic art and wonderful murals. Mosaics and murals decorated many of the public buildings, such as churches and cathedrals, including one of the largest mosaics in the world found in the ruins of the Church of the Holy Martyrs in Taybat al-Imam. Hundreds of remarkable images were found in different areas, many being kept in museums, such as the museum in Apamea, the Hama museum with the "Mosaic of the Musicians" from Maryamin, and the Maarrat al-Nu'man museum. Additional to Byzantine-period mosaics, many older, Roman-period mosaics have been unearthed in Syria, in locations such as the city of Shahba, the native hamlet of the Emperor Philip the Arab. Notable artworks were also found in the ancient Syrian city of Antioch (now in modern-day Turkey), and in the region of Hauran.

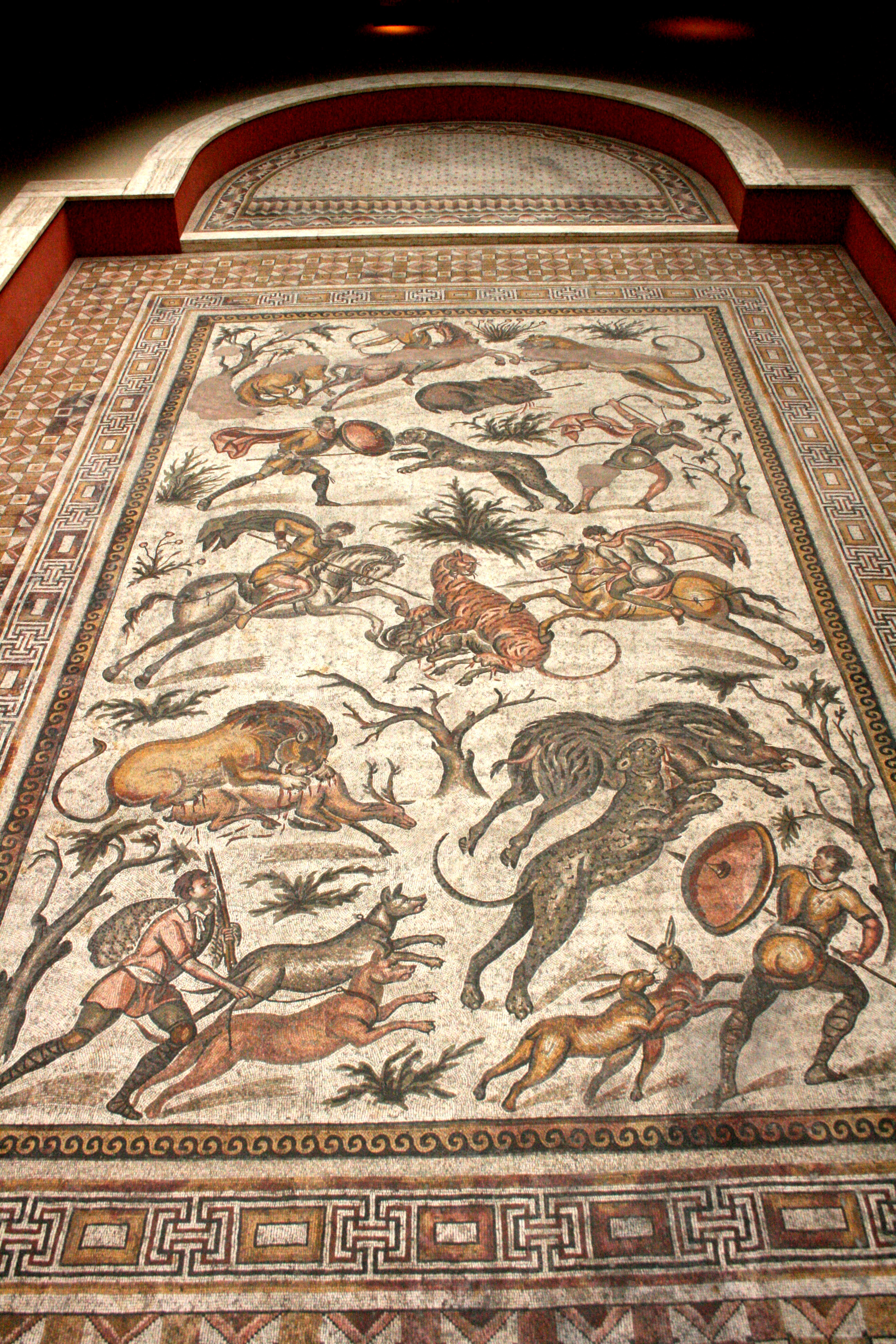
Great Hunting Mosaic from the Governor's residence, 414–420, found in Apamea.

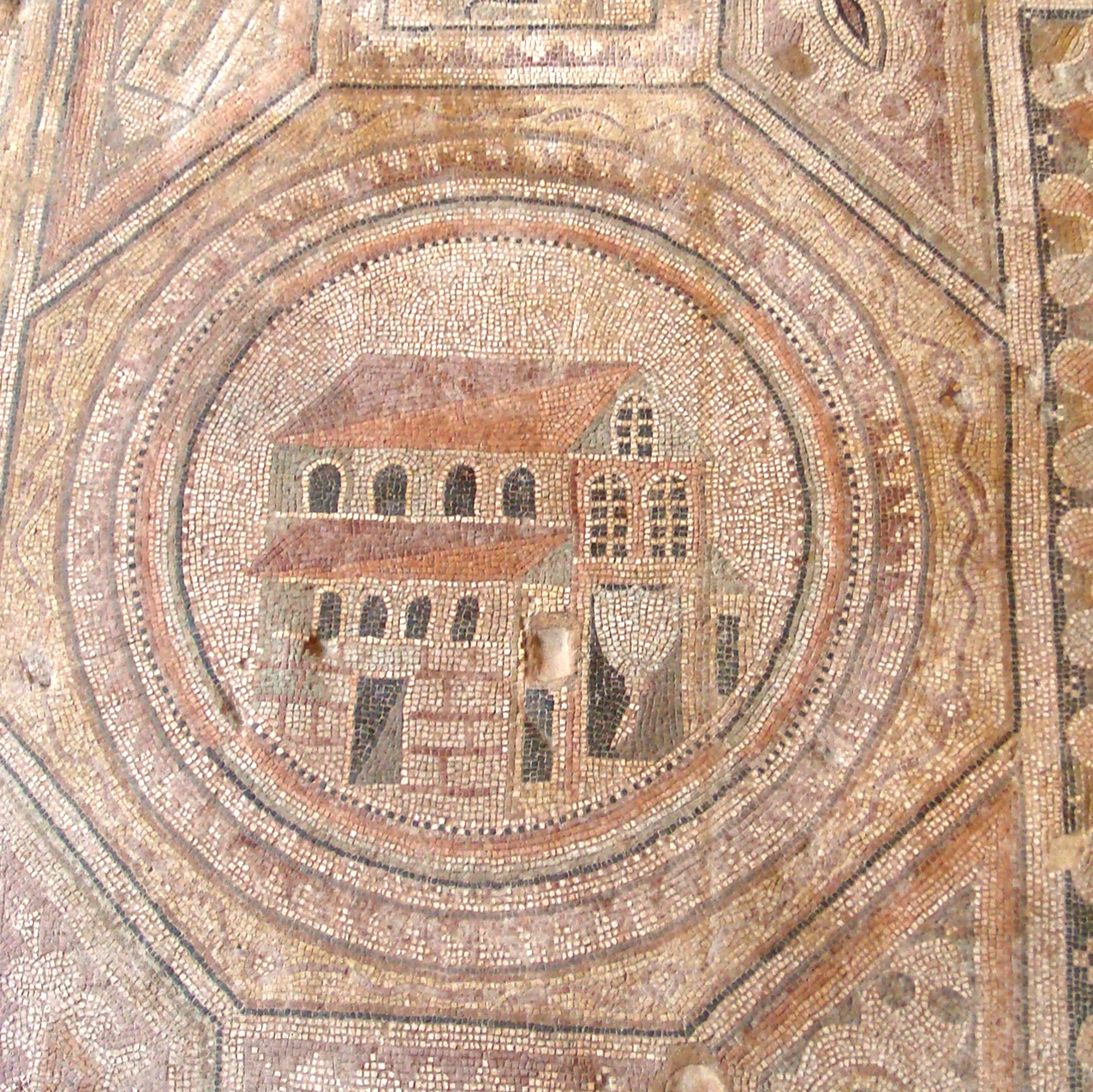
Mosaic of Taybat al-Imam.

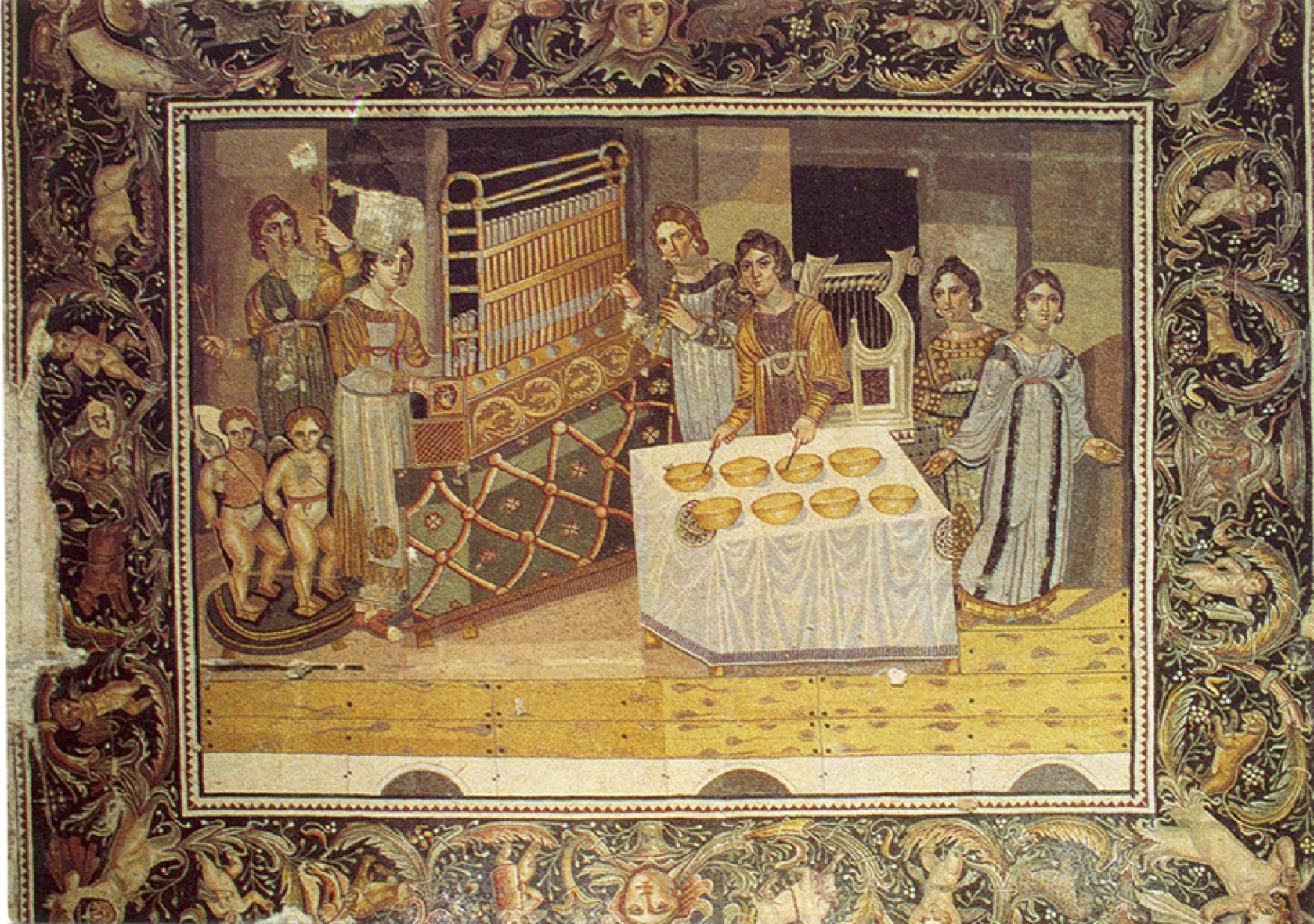
"Mosaic of the Musicians" with organ, aulos, oxyvaphi, and lyre from a Byzantine villa in Maryamin.

== Umayyad and early Abbasid periods ==
The Arab conquest of the Middle East in the 7th century did not break off the art of mosaic making. Arabs learned and accepted the craft as their own and carried on the classical tradition. During the Umayyad era Christianity retained its importance, churches were built and repaired and some of the most important mosaics of the Christian East were made during the 8th century when the region was under Islamic rule.

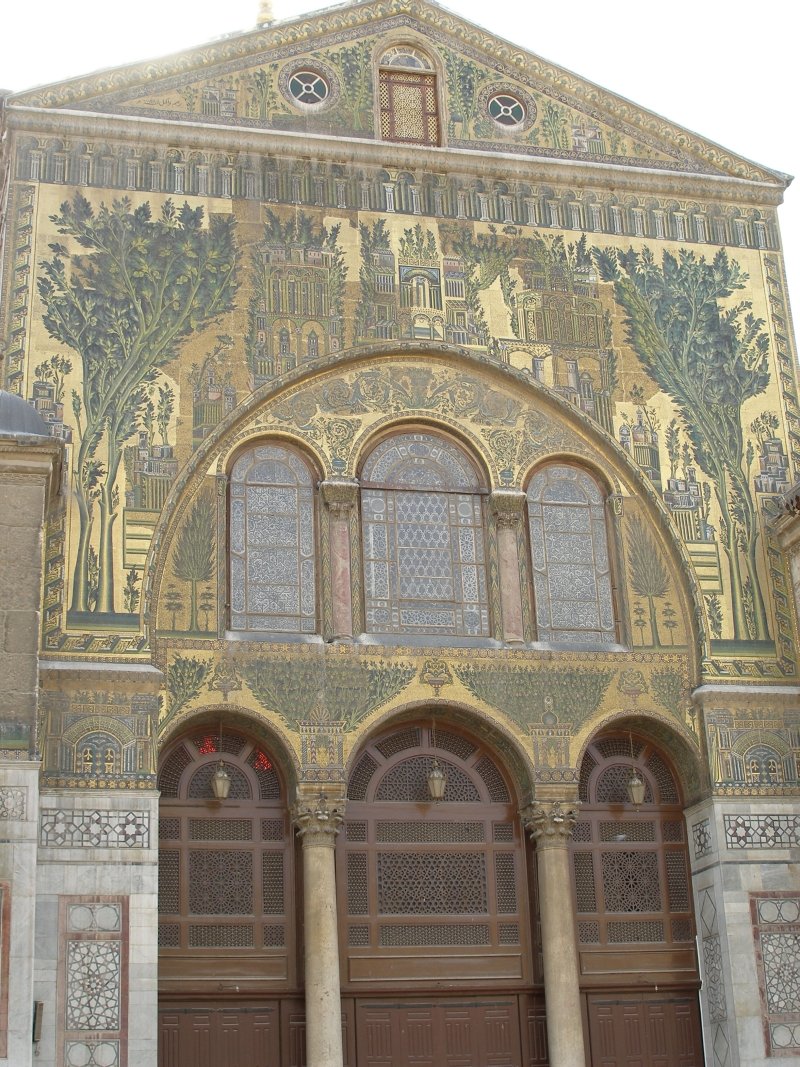
Mosaic façade of the Umayyad Mosque, in Syria (8th century)

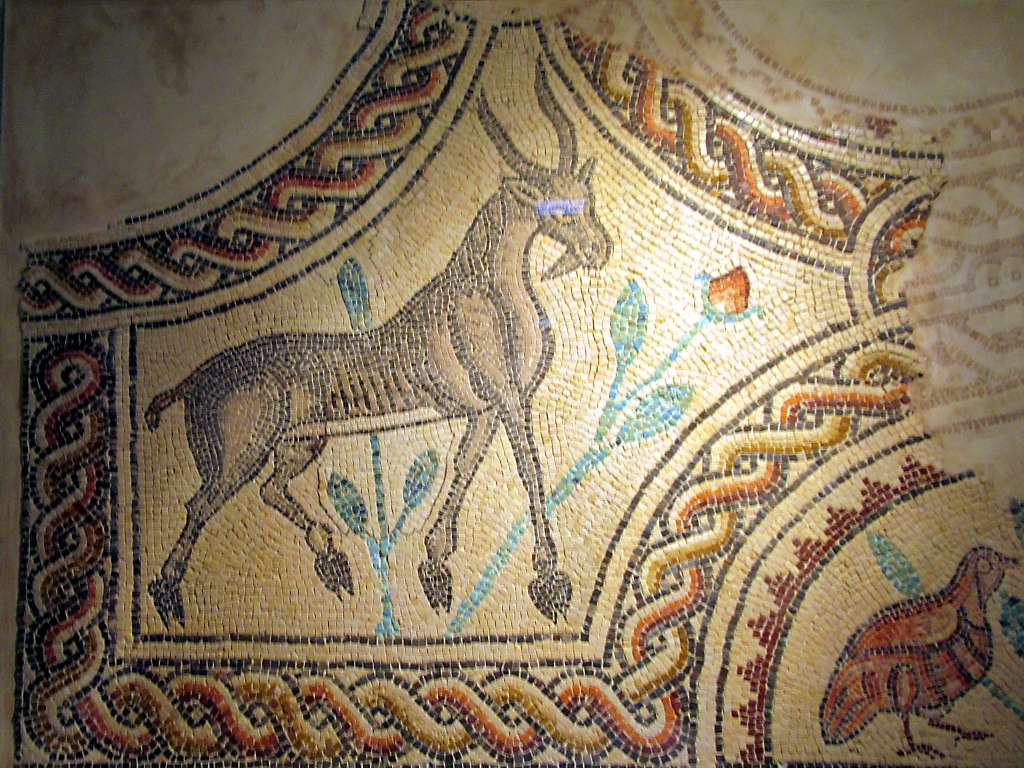
A gazelle mosaic in Hammam al-Sarah, in Jordan

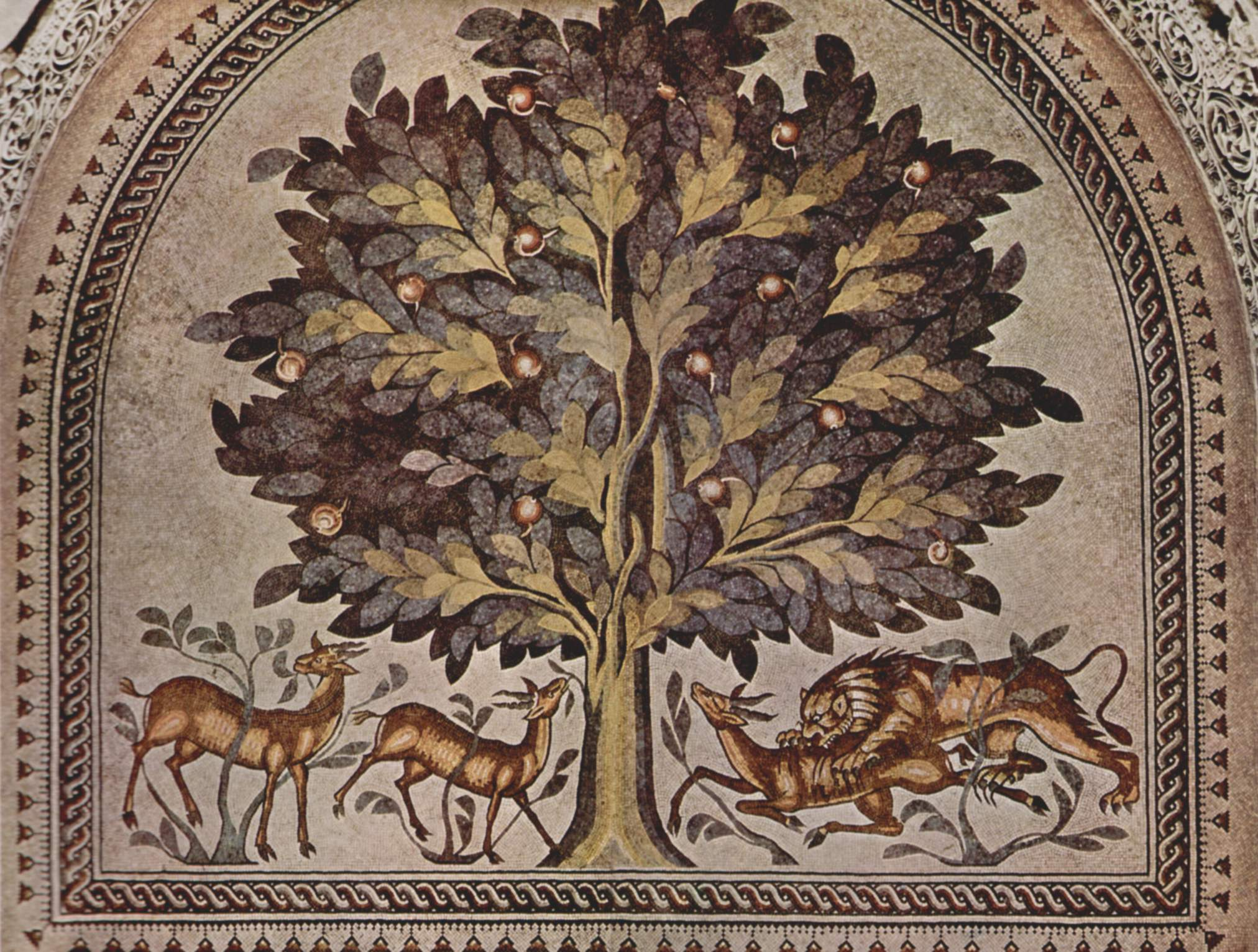
Mosaics of Hisham's Palace, in Palestine

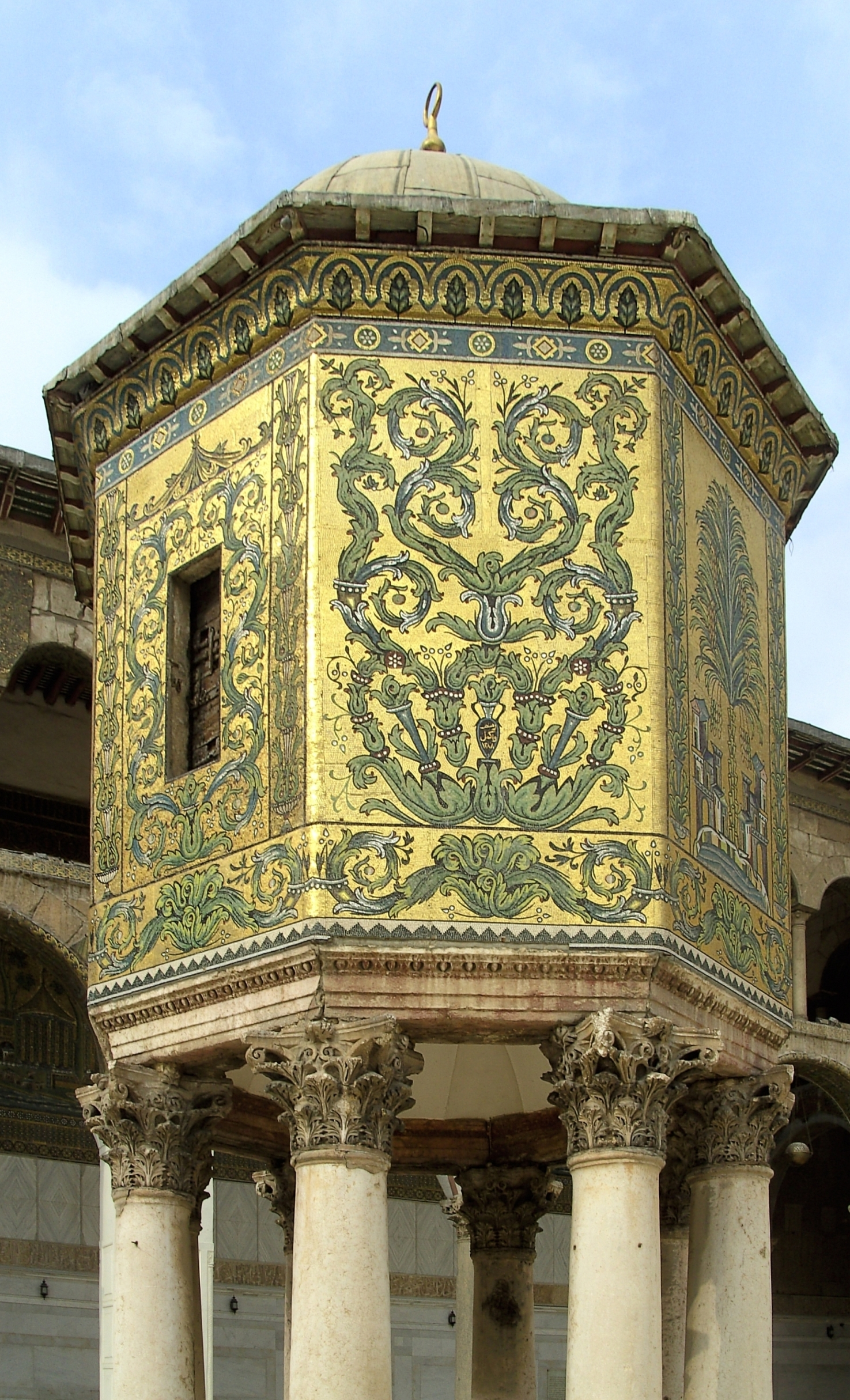
The mosaics of Qubbat al-Khazna built in the Abbasid era in 789,

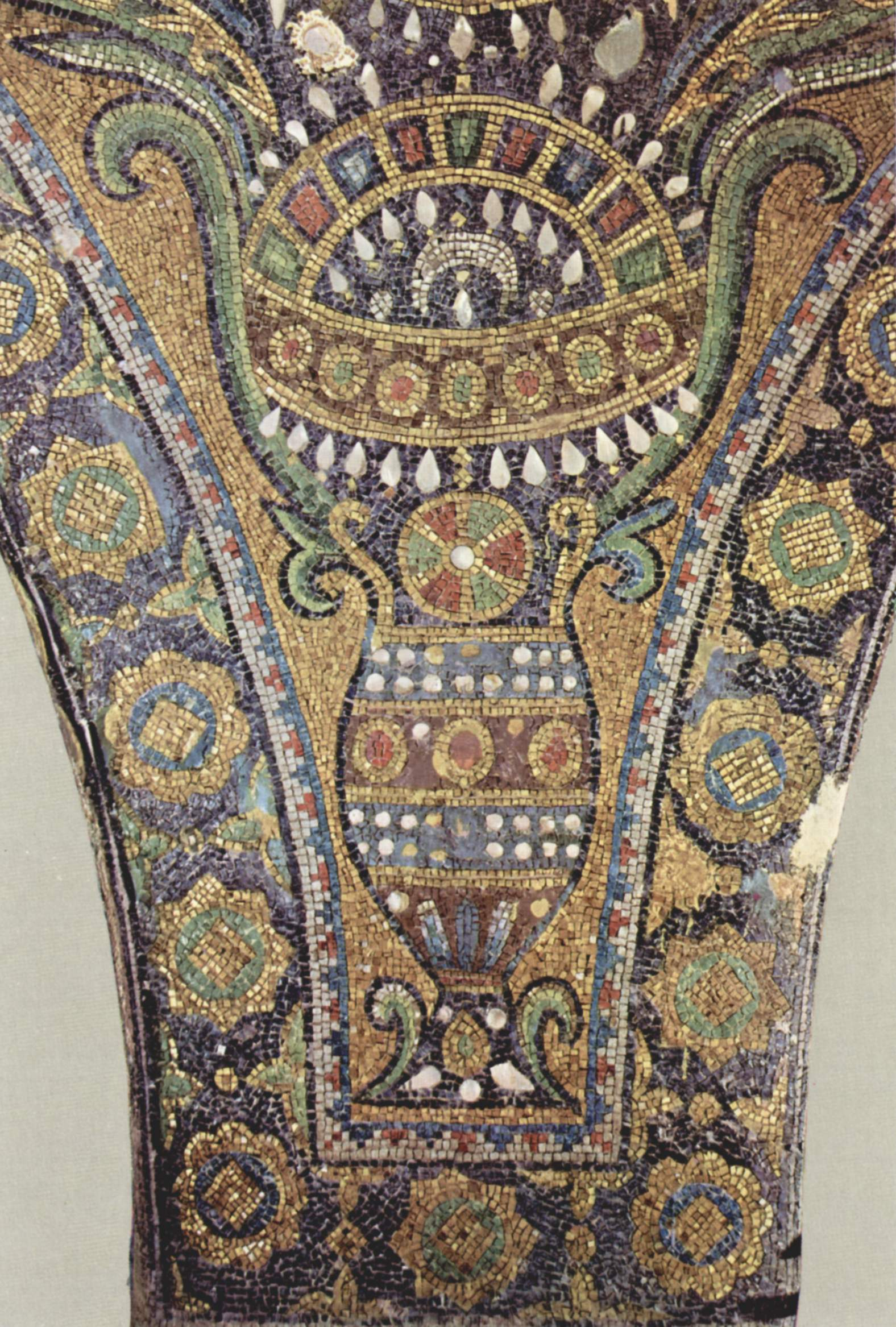
Islamic mosaics inside the Dome of the Rock in Palestine (c. 690)

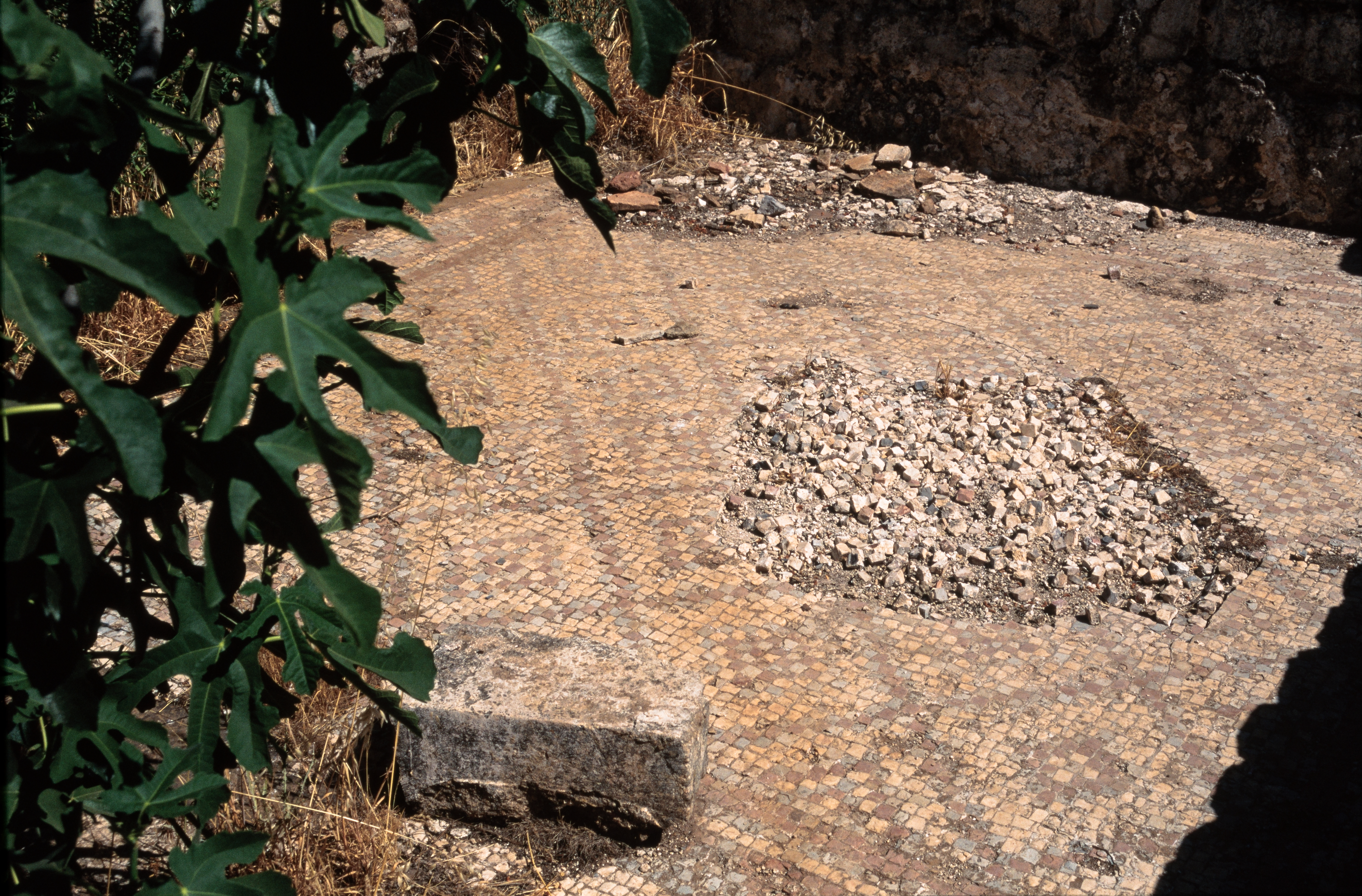
Remnants of mosaics in the Umayyad city of Anjar, in Lebanon (8th century)

=== Modern Jordan ===
==== Ma'in ====
The mosaic floors of the Acropolis Church at Ma’in (ancient Belemounta), dated by an inscription to 719–20 include depictions of 11 buildings representing cities in the Holy Land, as identified by Greek toponyms. All figures were damaged by iconoclasts and carefully replaced with various motifs.

==== Madaba ====
The last great mosaics in Madaba were made in 767 in the Church of the Virgin Mary (discovered in 1887). It is a masterpiece of the geometric style with a Greek inscription in the central medallion.

==== Umm ar-Rasas ====
The mosaics of the Church of St Stephen in ancient Kastron Mefaa (now Umm ar-Rasas) were made in 785 (discovered after 1986). The perfectly preserved mosaic floor is the largest one in Jordan. On the central panel hunting and fishing scenes are depicted while another panel illustrates the most important cities of the region (including Kastron Mefaa, Philadelphia, Madaba, Esbounta, Belemounta, Areopolis, Charac Moaba, Jerusalem, Nablus, Caesarea and Gaza). The frame of the mosaic is especially decorative. Six mosaic masters signed the work: Staurachios from Esbus, Euremios, Elias, Constantinus, Germanus and Abdela. It overlays another, damaged, mosaic floor of the earlier (587) "Church of Bishop Sergius." Another four churches were excavated nearby with traces of mosaic decoration.

=== Decline and demise ===
With the fall of the Umayyad dynasty in 750, the Middle East went through deep cultural changes. Not many mosaics were made after the end of the 8th century, and the tradition of mosaic making died out among the Christians and also in the Islamic community.

== See also ==
General topics

- List of Early Christian and Medieval mosaic
- Late Antique and medieval mosaics in Italy
- Levantine archaeology

People

- Michele Piccirillo (1944–2008) of the Franciscan Archaeological Institute at Mt Nebo/Studium Biblicum Franciscanum, expert in early Byzantine mosaics in Jordan, Palestine and Syria
