= Birds Mosaic (Jerusalem) =

Byzantine artwork discovered 1894

Armenian Mosaic
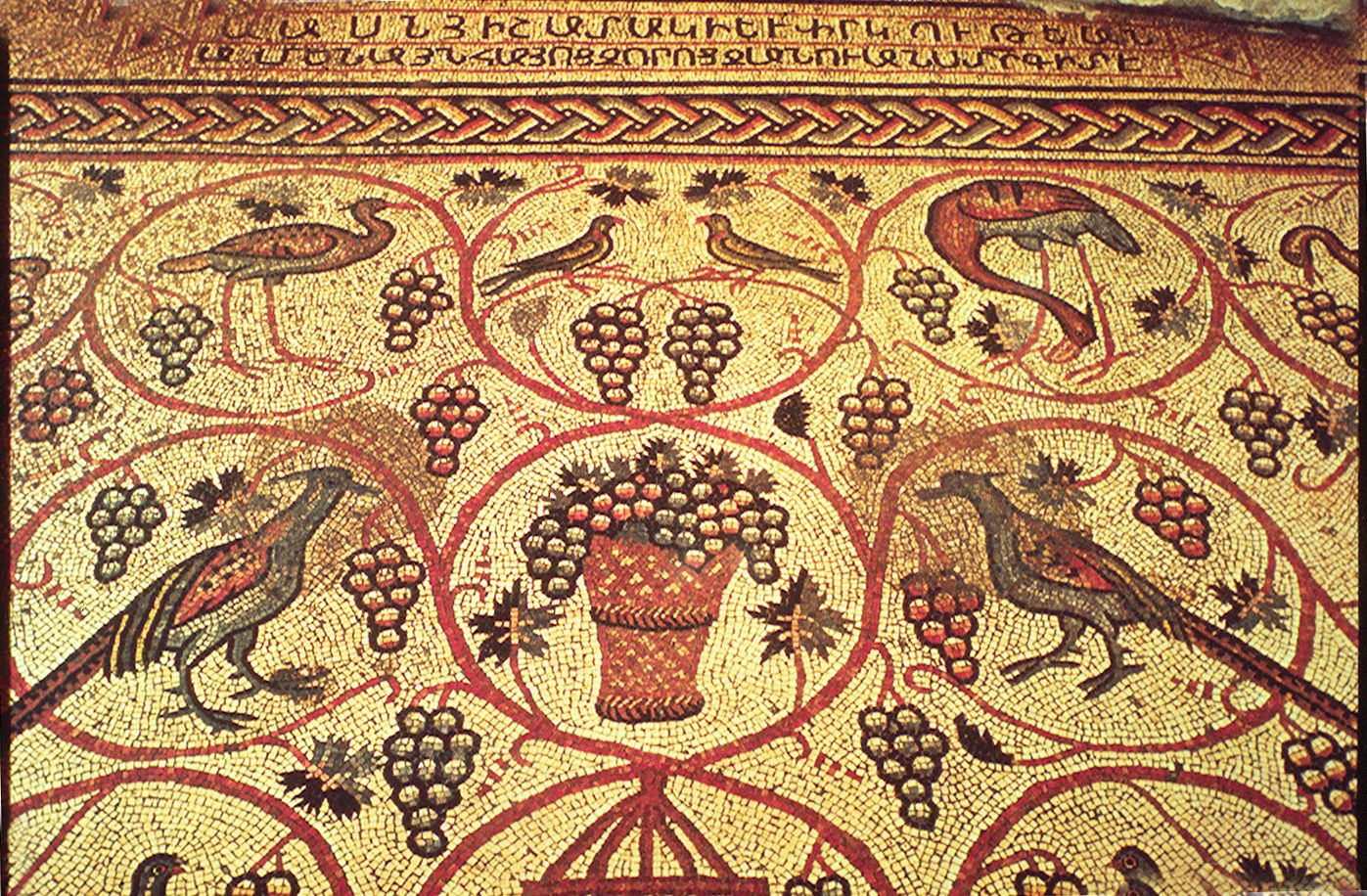
- Partial view with inscription at top.
- Material: Mosaic
- Created: AD 450 (1576 years ago) AD 640 (1386 years ago)
- Discovered: 1894
- Present location: Damascus Gate, Jerusalem
- Language: Classical Armenian

The Birds Mosaic (Armenian: Թռչունների խճանկար) or Armenian Mosaic (Armenian: Հայկական խճանկար), as it is popularly known, or the Musrara (Bird) Mosaic in academic parlance, is an almost perfectly preserved, richly decorated sixth-century mosaic floor from an Armenian mortuary chapel discovered some 300 metres northwest of the Damascus Gate in the Musrara neighbourhood of Jerusalem.

== Discovery and ownership ==
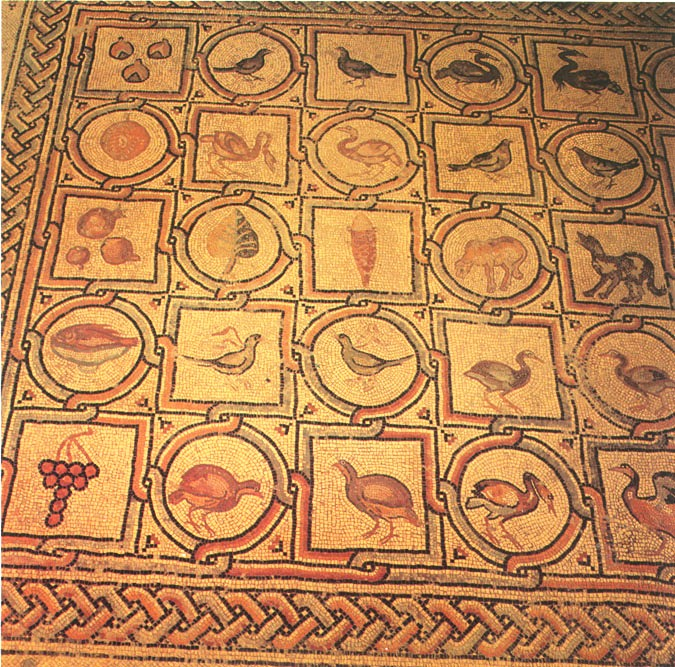

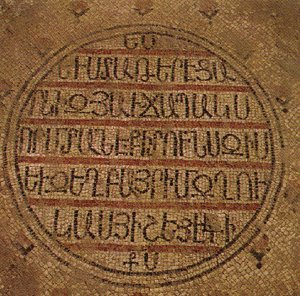
Armenian inscription close to Mosaic

The mosaic was discovered in 1894 a short distance outside Damascus Gate while building the foundation for a house. The Turkish authorities requested that the archaeologists Frederick J. Bliss and Archibald Dickie, who were working at the time on Mount Zion, to take upon themselves the excavation work. The development work slightly damaged the edges of the mosaic, and as soon as it was discovered the work ended, and the process of uncovering and preserving the mosaic began. When the Armenian inscription was revealed, the Armenian Patriarchate of Jerusalem expressed interest in purchasing the house, and eventually did purchase it, out of desire to emphasize the importance and centrality of the Armenian community in Byzantine Jerusalem.

== Significance ==
The Birds Mosaic is one of four Armenian mosaics from the Byzantine period which were discovered in this part of Jerusalem. The mosaic is considered one of the most important sites in the history of the local Armenian community in the city.

== Dating and identification ==
About 1000 mosaic floors have been discovered in the Holy Land. Most have been dated to the Byzantine period, between the years 450 and 640, when Muslims conquered the area and church art declined. Most of the mosaics adorned the floors of Greek or Armenian churches.

Based on the shape of the letters of the inscription and other criteria, the Musrara mosaic has been dated to the middle of the sixth century, about two centuries after the earliest evidence of Armenian presence in the Holy Land.

The mosaic is part of a large corpus of similarly decorated Byzantine-period floors from Palestine, discovered in churches as well as in synagogues from the time. The sixth century has seen a sharp rise in the number of Christian pilgrims coming to the Holy Land, leading to the construction of numerous monasteries around Jerusalem, some with pilgrim hostels and cemeteries, of which a cluster of at least four stood north of the city, placing the Bird Mosaic in a true "monastic quarter". An ancient list of Christian churches and monasteries mentions one dedicated to St. Polyeuctos in this area, which led to some researchers identifying the chapel with the mosaic as part of the St. Polyeuctos Monastery, but this is contested by others and has not been proven.

== Description and analysis ==
The almost fully preserved mosaic covers an area of about 4 by 6 meters.

=== Mosaic ===
==== Inscription ====
The mosaic includes a fully preserved inscription written in the Armenian alphabet, which states "For the memory and redemption of all the Armenians whose names God knowns".

The mosaic is considered to be part of a funerary chapel adjoining a monastery. Memorial chapels for the dead were a common feature of Armenian churches in the Byzantine period.

==== Decorative patterns ====
The colourful mosaic is bordered by a "plaited" frame.

The mosaic carpet includes figures of birds inscribed in 39 round medallions formed by grape vines. The medallions are set symmetrically, with each element on the right side being "reflected" by one to the left, so every bird on the right has a twin on the left, additionally to the elements decorating the central axis. Therefore, most of the birds are facing the central axis. The birds lack "depth " and perspective: while Greek and Roman mosaic art involved perspective and three-dimensional depiction, Byzantine mosaic art, evolving in Palestine from the 5th century on, was influenced by Eastern art which tended towards "flattening" of images and division of the area into squares or medallions.

The mosaic's head is at the entrance to the room, where an amphora is displayed with peacocks on either side. The amphora with peacocks is a common motif in Byzantine mosaic art, which can also be found for instance in the Byzantine church in Nahariya, but also in the Byzantine church in Sebastopol in Crimea. Thin, round grape vines extend from the mouth of the amphora to create the framework of the 39 medallions. Many grape leaves and clusters branch off from the vines, and are scattered around the mosaic. Interwoven grape vines are another common motif in Byzantine mosaic floors in Egypt, including in synagogues from the period, such as in Gaza and Maon. It seems that the artists of the period thus continued the Roman mosaic tradition.

The birds have been identified by scholars as a variety of species found in the Land of Israel, including pigeons, geese, storks, swallows, partridge, pheasants, and more. Armenian mosaic artists extensively used natural motifs, such as trees, flowers, birds, and other animals. The motifs are therefore a clear characteristic of Armenian art in general, and to this day Armenian ceramics, for example, are characterized by natural designs.

=== Interpretation ===
Nira Stone, by comparing with similarly decorated mosaics from Greek and Armenian churches, as well as synagogues from the Byzantine period, concludes that there is little reason to interpret too much into the images of the mosaic, seeing them as a common type of decoration. She reminds us that a Church edict from 427 had prohibited the use of religious subjects in mosaic floors, since walking on them would constitute a sacrilege.

However, many scholars see the subject of the mosaic as the passage from this world to the afterlife. The inscription at the head of the mosaic indicates that the chapel was intended to preserve the memory of the deceased, and the entire mosaic comes, then, to strengthen the connection between the worlds. According to this approach, one may see the caged bird as a symbol of the soul encaged in the body, which separates it from the body-free souls in the afterlife. The conch, which appears above the amphora on the central axis of the mosaic, where it symbolizes a holy place or royalty. Perhaps this is a symbol of "the kingdom of heaven". In addition, the eagle (or vulture) which looks backwards, unlike the other birds, perhaps symbolizes the separation from the dead and their memory. The large amphora, grape vines, and two peacocks are also motifs from the afterlife, as archaeologist Michael Avi-Yonah wrote about the synagogue in Maon in the southern West Bank: "The amphora and tendrils represent the Garden of Eden, and the peacocks on either side represent immortality."

=== Burial cave ===
A small cave was discovered under the southeast part of the mosaic. Among the findings in the cave were human bones and oil lamps, which were dated to the Byzantine period. Apparently the cave served as part of the chapel, and perhaps it is the burial place of those Armenians "whose names are known only to God".

== Comparison to the Birds Mosaic in Caesarea ==
In 1950, a mosaic was discovered in Caesarea, which likewise included many depictions of birds within medallions. This mosaic was originally identified as a church, but later excavations in 2004 led to the conclusion that it was the courtyard of a palace from the late Byzantine period.

Despite the great similarity in terms of style and material between the two mosaics, there is no further connection between them. The Jerusalem mosaic is small, the medallions are separated by grape vines, the birds face the central axis, and the building was religious. In contrast, the Caesarea mosaic is almost three times larger, the medallions have a stone border, all the birds face to the left, and the building was private. In addition, it is unknown who created the Caesarea mosaic, and there is no indication that the artists were Armenian.

== Location and access ==
The mosaic was initially located in an old building outside Damascus Gate, at 16, Prophets (HaNeviim) Street, in the Musrara neighbourhood. As of 2009, entrance to the site was possible only by coordination with the Armenian Patriarchate.

The mosaic has been transferred to the Armenian Quarter of the Old City, where it has been put on display in the courtyard of the renovated Mardigian Museum, which reopened in 2022.
