= Bar Kokhba Revolt =

Jewish rebellion against Roman rule (132–136 CE)

Bar Kokhba Revolt מֶרֶד בַּר כּוֹכְבָא
- Part of the Jewish–Roman wars
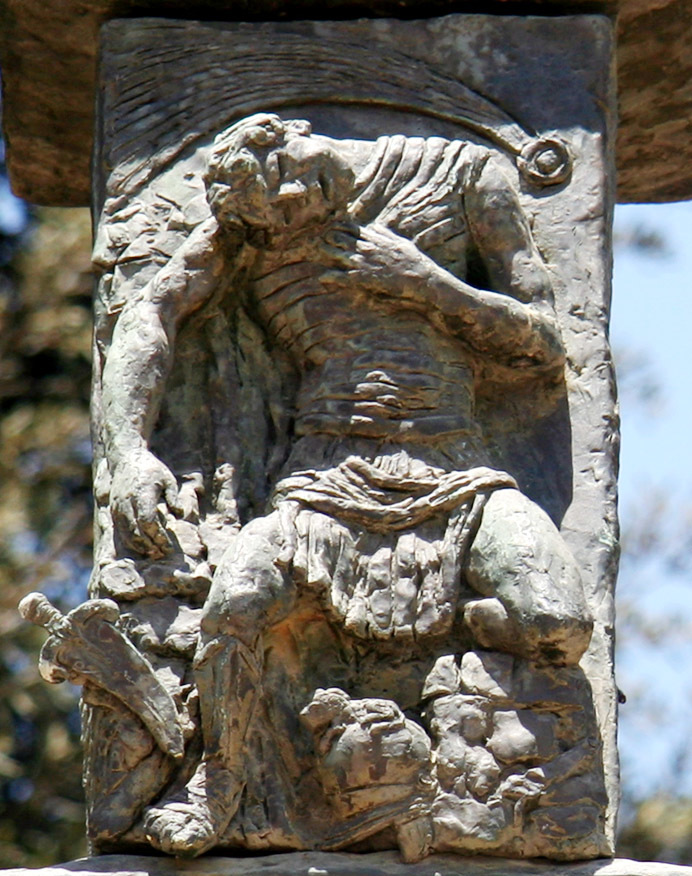
- Detail of Simon bar Kokhba from the Knesset Menorah
Date	132–136 CE (main phase: autumn 132 – summer 135)
Location	Judaea (Roman province)
Result	Roman victory
Territorial changes	Judea (region) reconquered; nearly depopulated

Belligerents
Roman Empire	Bar Kokhba state

Commanders and leaders
Hadrian; Quintus Tineius Rufus; Sextus Julius Severus; Gaius Poblicius Marcellus; Titus Haterius Nepos; Quintus Lollius Urbicus	Simon bar Kokhba †; Eleazar of Modi'im †; Akiva ben Joseph (executed); Yeshua ben Galgula †; Yonatan ben Bai'in; Masbelah ben Shimon; Eleazar ben Khita; Yehuda bar Menashe; Shimon ben Matanya

Units involved
At least nine legions (involved entirely or through detachments) Legio X Fretensis: Legio VI Ferrata; Legio III Cyrenaica; Legio V Gallica; Legio XXII Deiotariana; Legio IX Hispana (possible); Classis Misenensis (marines); Pannonian legionary detachment; Syrian legionary detachments; Vexillationes	Rebel army

Strength
Unknown (at least nine legions, either in full force or represented by detachments)	Unknown

Casualties and losses
Legio XXII Deiotariana possibly destroyed Legio IX Hispana possibly destroyed Legio X Fretensis sustained casualties	580,000 killed (Note: According to 2nd-century historian Cassius Dio (Roman History, LXIX, 14.1–2). This figure is accepted as reliable by several contemporary historians and archaeologists, including Hannah Cotton, Dvir Raviv, and Chaim Ben David.)

The Bar Kokhba Revolt (132–136 CE), (Note: Hebrew: מֶרֶד בַּר כּוֹכְבָא, romanized: Mereḏ Bar Kōḵḇāʾ) also known as the Bar Kokhba War, the War of Betar, (Note: A term occasionally used by ancient Jewish sources) and the Third (or Second) Jewish–Roman War, (Note: Alternatively, the Third Jewish Revolt and the Second Jewish Revolt, when not counting the Diaspora Revolt (115–117), which appears to have been only marginally fought in Judaea.) was the last and most devastating of three major Jewish rebellions against the Roman Empire. Led by Simon bar Kokhba, the rebels established an independent Jewish state that lasted over three years before being crushed by the Romans, leading to the near-total depopulation of Judea proper, along with mass killings, enslavement, and displacement.

Resentment toward Roman rule and national aspirations remained high in the Roman province of Judaea following the First Jewish Revolt. Around 130 CE, Emperor Hadrian planned to rebuild Jerusalem as Aelia Capitolina, a Roman colonia dedicated to Jupiter, extinguishing hopes for the restoration of the Temple in Jerusalem. This may have been accompanied by a ban on circumcision, though scholars differ on whether it preceded the mutiny or followed as punishment. These measures prompted preparations for a guerrilla campaign, including the construction of underground complexes within villages. Simon bar Kokhba was declared nasi ('prince') of Israel, and his administration issued standardized weights and its own coinage.

After an initial attempt to suppress the revolt by the provincial governor, Quintus Tineius Rufus, failed, Hadrian dispatched one of Rome's most capable generals, Sextus Julius Severus, supported by an unusually large concentration of forces drawn from across the empire. Following Severus's arrival in 133, the Romans systematically devastated towns and villages throughout the country. In 135, the stronghold of Betar fell and the Romans killed Simon bar Kokhba. Many rebels and refugees took shelter in natural caves in the Judaean Desert, but Roman troops besieged these hideouts, starving, killing, or capturing those inside.

The consequences of the revolt were disastrous for Judea's Jewish population. Ancient and contemporary sources estimate that hundreds of thousands were killed, with many others enslaved and displaced. The Romans imposed harsh religious prohibitions, including bans on circumcision, Torah study and Sabbath observance, though these were largely lifted after Hadrian's death. More enduring was the renaming of the province from Judaea to Syria Palaestina, an act intended to sever the region's historical association with the Jewish people, and the exclusion of Jews from Jerusalem and its environs. Rabbinic Judaism adopted a non-revolutionary stance, and Jewish messianism became more abstract. The center of Jewish life shifted northwards to Galilee, while the growing diaspora communities, particularly in Babylonia, gained increasing prominence.

== Evidence and primary sources ==
Reconstructing the Bar Kokhba Revolt is difficult, owing to the fragmentary and scattered character of the surviving evidence. Unlike the First Jewish–Roman War, which was chronicled by the contemporary historian Josephus, this later uprising lacks a comprehensive account. Instead, scholars rely on a small set of sources, including rabbinic literature, Greco-Roman and Christian writings, as well as the expanding body of archaeological material. Each carries its own biases, limitations, and chronological uncertainties.

The most detailed Roman account of the revolt appears in Cassius Dio's Roman History, the work of a Roman senator and historian writing in the early 3rd century. The relevant passages survive only through an 11th-century epitome by John Xiphilinus, generally considered faithful to the original. Dio's account is primarily military in focus and presents important information on the scale of the revolt and the heavy losses sustained by both sides. It describes the underground hideouts employed by the rebels, notes the solidarity of the global Jewish population, and mentions some non-Jewish participation. The surviving text does not, however, refer to Bar Kokhba by name.

Eusebius, a 4th-century bishop and historian from Caesarea Maritima, wrote a Christian interpretation of the revolt that frames Jewish suffering as divine punishment for the crucifixion of Jesus. Though influenced by a supersessionist worldview, his geographical proximity and access to Jewish traditions and lost materials—including the library of Pamphilus, church archives in Aelia Capitolina, earlier Christian writers such as Aristo of Pella and Julius Africanus, and possibly pagan texts—make his writings an important, albeit ideologically filtered, source for the revolt. He also provided details missing from Dio (whom he likely neither knew nor used as a source), such as naming Tineius Rufus as the Roman governor of Judaea, identifying Bar Kokhba as the revolt's leader and specifying Betar as the site of the final siege. (Note: The work refers to Bar Kokhba as Barchochebas, interpreting the name as 'son of a star,' while Bethar is rendered as Beththera.)

The Historia Augusta, a late Roman collection of imperial biographies compiled in the 4th century, devotes a single sentence to the revolt in its Life of Hadrian, briefly noting one of its possible causes. This portion of the work is believed to draw on relatively reliable Latin sources from the Severan period (193–235), making it roughly contemporary with Dio's account.

Rabbinic literature offers insight into how the Jewish population experienced and interpreted the events. Most rabbinic texts concern Jewish law (halakhah) rather than history, but their narrative sections (aggadah) preserve stories, teachings, and rulings pertaining to the period. While shaped by theological and didactic purposes, some of these traditions are considered to retain genuine historical memory, particularly where they are corroborated by external evidence. Many stories about the revolt, such as those regarding the fall of Betar, appear in the Babylonian Talmud (e.g., Gittin 55b–58a), the Jerusalem Talmud (Taanith iv 8, 68d–69b), and exegetical works like Lamentations Rabbah. A distinctive contribution of rabbinic literature is its portrayal of Bar Kokhba; it explicitly describes him as a messianic figure while expressing both sympathetic and critical views on his leadership and the revolt's disastrous outcomes. Rabbinic texts also record the execution of leading sages and the post-revolt persecutions.

Archaeological discoveries, beginning in the mid-20th century, have transformed scholarly understanding of the revolt. Chief among them are the papyri discovered in refuge caves in the Judaean Desert, which include correspondence between Bar Kokhba and his subordinates, as well as legal documents. (Note: About 30 texts have been preserved, three of which are in Greek, while the others are in Hebrew and Aramaic.) These documents illuminate the rebel state's administration, military organization, religious practices, and challenges, though they offer limited information about the revolt's military course. Additional evidence comes from coins minted under rebel authority, which help estimate the revolt's duration, clarify its objectives, and assess the geographic extent of the rebel state.

== Ante bellum ==
=== Judaea between the two revolts ===
Between 66 and 73, Judaea was the center of the First Jewish–Roman War. The suppression campaign culminated in the siege of Jerusalem (70 CE), with the destruction of the Second Temple and the devastation of Jerusalem, the national and religious center of the Jewish people. Large numbers died from fighting, famine, disease, and massacres, while many others were displaced or enslaved. The war also ended the High Priesthood and the Sanhedrin (Jewish high court) as institutions of Jewish authority, leaving the Pharisaic tradition, carried forward by the rabbinic movement, as the dominant force shaping Judaism's future direction. (Note: Though not all early rabbis were Pharisees, and they did not claim the label, Pharisaic teachings and practices were preserved by the emerging rabbinic movement. The house of Gamaliel—a prominent Pharisaic lineage whose descendants became leading rabbinic figures for generations—reflects the continuity between the two groups.) The Romans also imposed a new tax on Jews throughout the Empire, the Fiscus Judaicus, set at the same rate as the annual donations Jews had previously made to the Jerusalem Temple.

Yet communal life gradually recovered in Judaea, and Jews continued to form a relative majority of the population. This period was marked by the persistence of messianism—the Jewish belief in a messiah, a divinely appointed leader who would restore the Davidic kingdom and inaugurate an era of peace and prosperity—and apocalypticism—the expectation of a cataclysmic divine intervention that would bring an end to the current age. These expectations found expression in works such as 4 Ezra and 2 Baruch, which voiced hopes that Rome would soon be overthrown by divine action.

Following the revolt, Judaea underwent administrative restructuring: a senatorial-rank official (legate) was appointed governor, and Legio X Fretensis, which had participated in the conquest of Jerusalem, was permanently garrisoned amid the city's ruins. The central and southern regions of Judaea, namely Judea (proper) and Idumaea, were designated a military zone, administered by officers of the legion. (Note: Note the distinction between Judea, the geographic region centered on Jerusalem and encompassing the Judaean Mountains, Judaean Lowlands, and Judaean Desert, and Judaea, the broader Roman administrative unit. The latter included Judea proper alongside other regions of the southern Levant, such as Samaria, Idumaea, Galilee, and Perea.) Former soldiers and other Roman citizens settled in the province.

In 115–117, during the reign of Emperor Trajan, Jewish diaspora communities in Egypt, Cyrenaica, Cyprus, and Mesopotamia launched a series of uprisings known as the Diaspora Revolt. Epigraphic and later literary evidence also indicates that Judaea itself saw a Roman campaign at this time, remembered in rabbinic tradition as the "Kitos War"—a designation derived from the name of the general Lusius Quietus, identified as a Maurus, whom Trajan placed in charge of the province to enforce order. Hostilities may have been provoked by Roman cult practices in Jerusalem: Hippolytus reports that a legion under Trajan erected an idol of Korē, while an inscription records soldiers of Legio III Cyrenaica dedicating an altar or statue to Serapis in Trajan's final year. Because the sources for hostilities in Judaea during this period are scarce, largely late, and unmentioned in primary accounts of the Diaspora Revolt, the nature of these events remains contested and was probably minor. (Note: According to historian Lester L. Grabbe, if any unrest did take place in Judaea, it was likely quickly suppressed by Quietus.)

Following Hadrian's accession in 117, Quietus was relieved of his position in Judaea and replaced by Marcus Titius Lustricus Bruttianus. Around this time, a second legion, Legio II Traiana Fortis, was stationed in the province. This raised the garrison to two legions and elevated Judaea's administrative status to that of a proconsular province, placing it under a proconsul, a higher-ranking official. Soldiers of the new legion were soon deployed on infrastructure projects: milestones dating to approximately 120 document the construction of a new road from Acre to Sepphoris and Caparcotna, establishing the latter as a northern base and securing a key corridor between Judea, Galilee, Egypt, and Syria. Roman efforts to stabilize the region by settling loyal populations, including retired veterans, contributed to the growing alienation of its Jewish inhabitants.

=== Causes ===
Ancient sources identify two principal triggers for the revolt: Cassius Dio cited Jewish anger over Hadrian's plan to rebuild Jerusalem as the Roman colony Aelia Capitolina, while the Historia Augusta points to a ban on circumcision (Brit milah), a central Jewish practice. Recent scholarship has increasingly rejected the latter source as unreliable, and the establishment of Aelia Capitolina is now generally regarded as the revolt's primary cause.

==== Establishment of Aelia Capitolina ====
Hadrian visited Judaea during his tour of the Roman East in 129–130, founding or re-founding cities and promoting Greco-Roman culture; the province’s non-Jewish population honored him with new city names and festivals. During the tour, he decided to rebuild the ruined city of Jerusalem as a Roman colony called Aelia Capitolina, after his family name (Note: Hadrian's full name was Publius Aelius Hadrianus.) and in honor of Capitoline Jupiter, the chief deity of Roman state religion. (Note: Archaeologist Yoram Tsafrir argues that renaming Jerusalem to Aelia Capitolina was intended to suppress Jewish national identity; however, although "Aelia" remained the official name during the Roman and Byzantine periods and after the Arab conquest into the early Islamic period, Jews and Christians continued using "Jerusalem.") Scholars have suggested that the colony's formal establishment took place during Hadrian's visit and included the sulcus primigenius, the traditional Roman ritual of "ploughing a furrow" to demarcate city boundaries. (Note: References to a Roman ploughing ceremony in Jerusalem appear in Jerome (In Zach. 8.19) as well as the Jerusalem Talmud (Ta'anit 4.8, 69b) and the Babylonian Talmud (Ta'anit 29a). Archaeologist David M. Jacobson has further suggested that the surface of the Temple Mount, where the Jewish Temple formerly stood, was lowered by more than a meter to prepare foundations for the Capitolium (a temple dedicated to Jupiter).) These measures provoked anger among the Jewish population, extinguishing hopes of restoring Jerusalem and the Temple. (Note: The introduction of foreign polytheistic practices in Jerusalem had previously sparked Jewish revolt in the 160s BCE, when Antiochus IV's desecration of the Temple led to the Maccabean Revolt.)

Historian Mary E. Smallwood interpreted the foundation of Aelia Capitolina as "an attempt to combat resurgent Jewish nationalism" by secularizing the Jewish holy capital. Historian Martin Goodman argued that Hadrian established the colony as a "final solution for Jewish rebelliousness", intended to forestall future uprising among Jews in Judaea or the diaspora through the permanent erasure of the city's Jewish character. Goodman argued that the foundation of a Roman colony (rather than a Greek polis) was designed to transplant foreign populations and impose Roman religious practices. While Hadrian founded cities elsewhere, this case was unique in that its purpose was "not to flatter but to suppress the natives." Historian Menahem Mor rejected the view that Aelia's construction was an "intentional anti-Jewish measure", seeing it instead as integrating Judaea into the Hellenistic system prevalent in the Roman East.

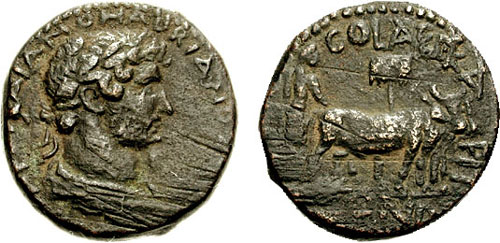
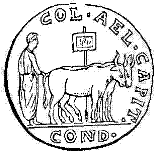
The first coin issued at the mint of Aelia Capitolina about 130/132 AD. Reverse: COL[ONIA] AEL[IA] CAPIT[OLINA] COND[ITA] ('The founding of Colonia Aelia Capitolina').

A rabbinic narrative found in Genesis Rabbah, seemingly set during Hadrian's reign, relates that the Romans initially permitted the Temple's reconstruction but withdrew the offer after a Samaritan warned that a restored city would lead to rebellion. According to the account, Joshua ben Hananiah, a sage who died shortly before the revolt, prevented the situation from escalating into armed conflict. The historicity of this tradition has been questioned, as the motif of a malevolent Samaritan is common in Jewish literature from this period; it may instead reflect Jewish disappointment over the unrealized rebuilding of the Temple.

The question of whether the city's founding triggered the revolt or constituted a punitive measure imposed afterward has been long debated. This disagreement arose from two principal sources. According to Cassius Dio, the establishment of the city and the erection of a temple to Jupiter on the Temple Mount provoked "a long and serious war, since the Jews objected to having gentiles settled in their city and foreign cults established." In contrast, Eusebius described the colony as a punitive measure, (Note: Eusebius's explanation may reflect his supersessionist views.) stating: "when the city had been emptied of the Jewish nation and had suffered the total destruction of its ancient inhabitants, it was colonized by a different race, and the Roman city which subsequently arose changed its name." The question was largely resolved by the 1998 discovery of a coin hoard in the el-Jai cave in the northern Judaean Desert. The hoard, concealed before 135, contained coins minted in Aelia Capitolina alongside Bar Kokhba coins, demonstrating that the colony had been established and was minting its own currency prior to the revolt's conclusion.

==== Ban on circumcision ====
The Historia Augusta's biography of Hadrian states that the Jews "began a war because they were forbidden to mutilate their genitals", using "mutilate" to refer to circumcision (Brit milah), the central Jewish practice. (Note: Another ancient work that described circumcision as mutilation was John Chrysostom's Adversus Judaeos, a Christian homily written in the 4th century CE.) The reliability of this account is disputed, as the work was composed centuries later and contains inaccuracies. Furthermore, because rabbinic literature describes such a ban as a punitive measure enacted after the revolt, scholars disagree on whether the prohibition functioned as a cause of the conflict or as a consequence.

Scholars who argue the ban preceded the revolt suggest it reflected Hadrian's commitment to Hellenistic norms, which regarded circumcision as a form of barbaric bodily mutilation. Such a measure would be consistent with his broader efforts to promote a Greco-Roman cultural identity across the empire. This theory is supported by the precedent of earlier emperors, such as Domitian (r. 81–96) and Nerva (r. 96–98), who had already imposed restrictions on other forms of bodily mutilation, such as castration. Further support is found in the fact that Hadrian's successor, Antoninus Pius (r. 138–161), is known to have granted Jews permission to circumcise their sons (though not proselytes), (Note: Based on Modestinus, Rules, 48.8.11) implying that a prior prohibition had been in effect.

Smallwood proposed that Hadrian imposed a universal ban on circumcision later rescinded by Antoninus Pius. She cited Talmudic passages suggesting the ban predated the revolt – including an account of Rabbi Eliezer ben Hyrcanus permitting circumcision knives to be hidden, and discussions of mesukhim (men who underwent epispasm to restore their foreskins), which she interpreted as attempts to evade the ban. Historian Aharon Oppenheimer countered that there is no reliable evidence for a pre-revolt ban, describing the Historia Augusta as highly unreliable and its passage on mutilation as an attempt to ridicule Jews. He reinterpreted both Talmudic passages as referring to the post-revolt period of repression, and the mesukhim discussions as reflecting cultural assimilation rather than evasion of an edict, accepting the foundation of Aelia Capitolina as the sole cause of the revolt. Historian Benjamin Isaac argued that an empire-wide ban was not impossible, but is difficult to reconcile with the established pattern of Roman religious policy of recognizing the ancestral religions while restricting conversion: Jews could circumcise their own sons, but not non-Jews, since circumcision represented a formal act of conversion. For him, the Historia Augusta passage was a "satirical statement". Historian Peter Schäfer argued that Hadrian was a political pragmatist who would have avoided so obvious a provocation.

==== Internal factors ====
In addition to the immediate triggers, several underlying factors probably contributed to conditions favorable for revolt. One such factor may have been eschatological anticipation. The Babylonian exile following the destruction of Jerusalem and Solomon's Temple in 587/586 BCE lasted seventy years, after which the Jews were allowed to return and rebuild the Temple—a duration understood as the fulfillment of a prophecy in the biblical Book of Jeremiah. By 130 CE, approximately sixty years had elapsed since Jerusalem's destruction, and the approaching seventy-year mark may have generated expectations of divine intervention. Growing frustration at its absence may have increased readiness for an armed struggle.

Additional factors thought to have contributed to the revolt include changes in administrative law and the expanding presence of privileged Roman citizens. Rising Jewish nationalism, likely intensified by the Diaspora Revolt, may also have played a role. Economic hardship following the First Jewish Revolt may have fueled unrest, as many Jews lost their land to Roman veterans and collaborators, creating a dispossessed class that likely formed an important base of support for Simon bar Kokhba. According to Mor, Bar Kokhba's charisma was the main catalyst for the uprising.

== The Bar Kokhba state ==
=== Leadership and military ===
The revolt was led by Simon bar Kokhba, whose coins described him as Nasi (Hebrew for "prince" or "president"). Ancient sources differ on his name: rabbinic texts call him Ben Kosiba, while Bar Kokhba (Aramaic for "son of the star") appears only in Christian sources. (Note: Christian patristic sources render it in Greek as Barkhokhebas.) Letters he signed confirm that Shimʻon ben Kosibah (Note: The Hebrew spelling, in his own autograph, is found in P. Mur. 43, a letter from Wadi Murabba'at that renders it as שמעון בן כוסבה. Evidence for the vocalization of the name appears in P. Yadin 59, a letter from Naḥal Ḥever which provides the Greek transliteration Σιμων Χωσιβα.) was his actual name, not a derogatory nickname as once thought. (Note: It was previously suggested that the rabbinic moniker Bar Kosiba is Aramaic for "son of disappointment" or "son of lies". The surname Ben Kosibah is believed to derive from his place of origin (a place called Kosibah). One option is Kosiba, located 8 kilometers north of Hebron. Another alternative is Khirbet En el-Kizbe, a ruin in the Judaean Foothills near the Te'omim Cave. Alternatively, the surname could be a patronymic (i.e. "son of Kosibah").) The title Bar Kokhba was likely a messianic honorific, alluding to the "star (kokhav) out of Jacob" prophecy in Numbers 24:17. The tannaim (rabbinic sages) were divided over the revolt. Rabbi Akiva reportedly endorsed Bar Kokhba as the messiah, a view challenged by Yohanan ben Torta, who retorted that "grass will grow on your cheeks" before the messiah arrived (Jerusalem Talmud, Ta'anit, IV, 8).

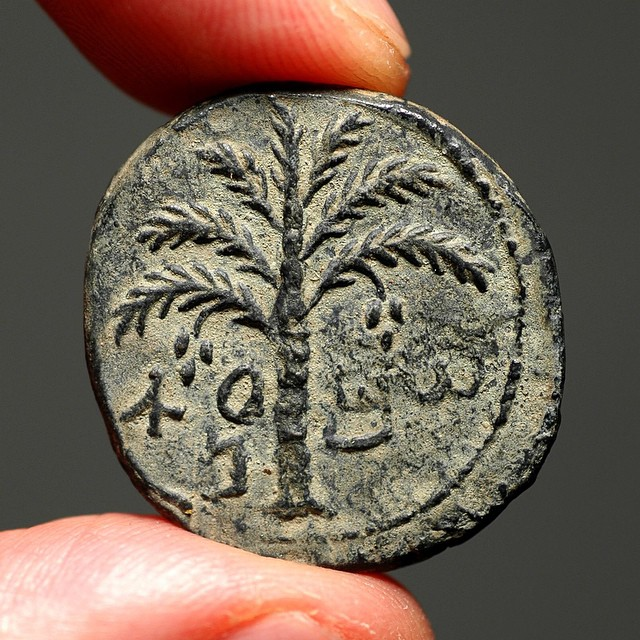
Coin depicting the revolt leader's first name, Simon, in Paleo-Hebrew script, alongside a date palm

Bar Kokhba's letters portray a demanding military commander who personally managed discipline and logistics and issued sharp rebukes to subordinates. In one letter, he reprimanded officers at Ein Gedi for harboring individuals from Tekoa (now Tuqu'), apparently to evade conscription. In another, he threatened a commander, Yeshua ben Galgula, saying, "I shall put your feet in fetters as I did to Ben Aphlul!" The letters also reflect Bar Kokhba's observance, including the keeping of Shabbat and the laws of ma'aserot (tithings). In one letter, he instructs his men to procure lulavim (palm branches) and etrogs to fulfill the mitzvah of the four species during the festival of Sukkot.

Bar Kokhba commanded a hierarchically organized army with ranks such as "head of a camp". His letters name figures such as Judah bar Manasse, commander of Kiryath Arabaya, and Johnathan bar Beysayan and Masabala bar Simeon, commanders of Ein Gedi. They also suggest that his forces were composed of observant Jews.

=== Coinage and weights ===
The Bar Kokhba state asserted its sovereignty through the issuance of new currency in both silver and bronze. These coins were produced by overstriking existing Roman coinage, replacing the original imagery with Jewish motifs and inscriptions. The state's silver currency consisted primarily of the sela (tetradrachm) and the zuz (denarius), with four zuzim equaling one sela. A rare half-sela (shekel) is also documented. The nature of the bronze coinage remains debated, with scholars disagreeing on whether the various issues were intended to serve as three or four distinct denominations.

The coinage indicates that the restoration of Jewish independence and the Jerusalem Temple were primary objectives of the uprising. The obverse of first-year silver tetradrachms features a depiction of the Temple façade, apparently housing the Ark of the Covenant, with the word "Jerusalem" alongside. The reverse shows lulav and etrog, alongside the inscription "Year One of the Redemption of Israel". (Note: The exact start of "year one" of the administration remains debated, with some scholars proposing Nissan (March/April) 132, while others suggest the summer or fall of that year.) Coins from the second year and undated issues introduce slogans such as "For the Freedom of Israel" and "For the Freedom of Jerusalem". Also depicted on the coins are grapevines, palm trees, musical instruments (including harps and trumpets), and Temple vessels (including amphorae and jugs). The inscriptions are all in Hebrew, written in the archaic Paleo-Hebrew alphabet of Iron Age Israel and Judah rather than the dominant square Hebrew script of the period. As in earlier revolts, the resurgence of Hebrew served as a symbol of Jewish nationhood.

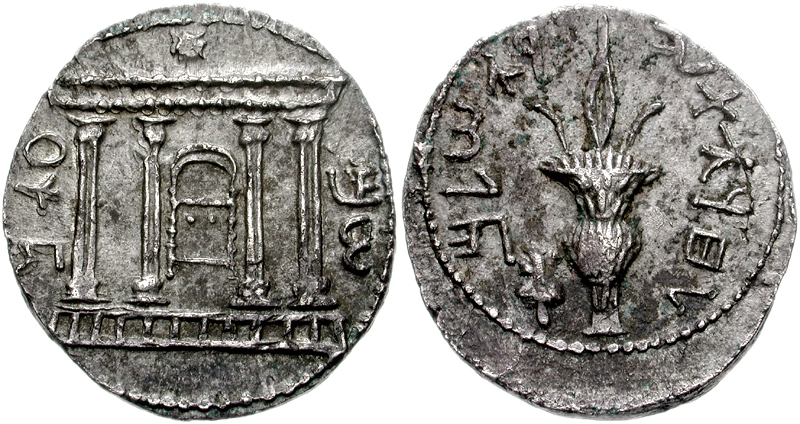
A Bar Kokhba tetradrachm overstruck on a denarius. Obverse: the Jerusalem Temple façade with the rising star. Reverse: A lulav, the text reads: "for the freedom of Jerusalem"

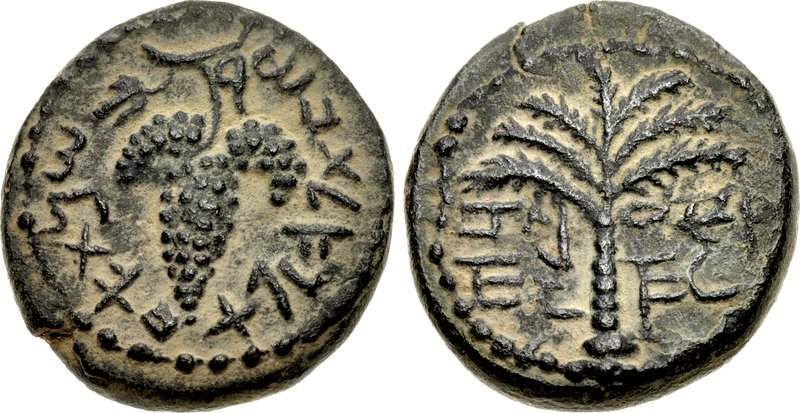
Obverse: Grapes, the text reads: "year 1 to the redemption of Israel". Reverse: a date palm with two branches of dates; "Eleazar the Priest" around

Simon Bar Kokhba is often depicted on the coins as "Simeon, Prince (Nasi) of Israel". First-year issues also bear the name "Eleazar the Priest", though his precise identity remains unknown. Some scholars identify him as Eleazar, Bar Kokhba's uncle, who, according to rabbinic tradition, was ultimately killed by Bar Kokhba for seeking negotiations with the Romans. Regardless, the pairing of a priestly figure with the political leader suggests that the administration was preparing for the Temple's reconstruction and the restoration of the High Priesthood.

The administration also produced official lead weights as an additional expression of independence. Seven such official weights are currently known: three bear inscriptions in the Paleo-Hebrew alphabet and four in the square Hebrew script. One specimen features a six-petaled rosette encircled by inscriptions naming Bar Kokhba as "Ben Kosba, Prince of Israel" and another individual, "Shimon Dasoi", identified as parnas—an official responsible for overseeing weights and measures, comparable to the Greek agoranomos (market official).

As the majority of specimens originated from looting, Bar Kokhba coins recovered during controlled excavations are of particular scientific value. By 2024, their distribution spanned the entirety of Judea, from the Beersheba region in the south to the Aqraba region in the north, indicating continued rebel activity in these areas into the revolt's third year. Within Judea, the southernmost discoveries occurred at Ein Bokek and the Naḥal Yatir site, while the northernmost were located at Tel Shiloh and the Wadi er-Rashash cave. Outside Judea proper, specimens have been identified at four sites in the Sharon Plain, including Caesarea, Tel Michal and Mikhmoret; these are likely souvenirs retained by Roman soldiers, as evidenced by one coin found with a hole for use as a pendant. Similarly, the few coins found in Jerusalem and nearby sites such as Ramat Rachel were likely brought there by Roman forces.

Twenty-four Bar Kokhba coins have been found outside Judaea, mostly at Roman installations: one in London, Britannia; twelve in Pannonia; and three in Dacia. The only coin recovered from a civilian settlement was found in Zadar, Dalmatia. These coins may have been brought as souvenirs or spoils of war by Roman soldiers who served in Judaea, or alternatively by Jewish refugees or enslaved captives who reached these regions.

=== Extent ===
The precise extent of Bar Kokhba's territorial control remains uncertain. Most scholars agree the rebels held all of Judea proper (not the entire province of Judaea), including the villages of the Judaean Mountains, the Judaean Desert, southern Samaria, and the northern Negev Desert. Rebel coinage distribution indicates the state borders extended from the Arad–Beersheba region in the south to areas north of modern Ramallah, westward toward the lowlands near Kiryat Gat and Shoham, and east to the western shore of the Dead Sea and the southern Jordan Valley. This territory measured approximately 40 kilometres (25 mi) from east to west and 80 kilometres (50 mi) from south to north. Whether the revolt extended beyond this core is debated: "maximalists" argue it reached regions such as Galilee and the Golan Heights, while "minimalists" confine it to Judea and its immediate surroundings. Whether the rebels captured Jerusalem and resumed sacrificial worship on the Temple Mount, former site of the Jerusalem Temple, also remains unclear.

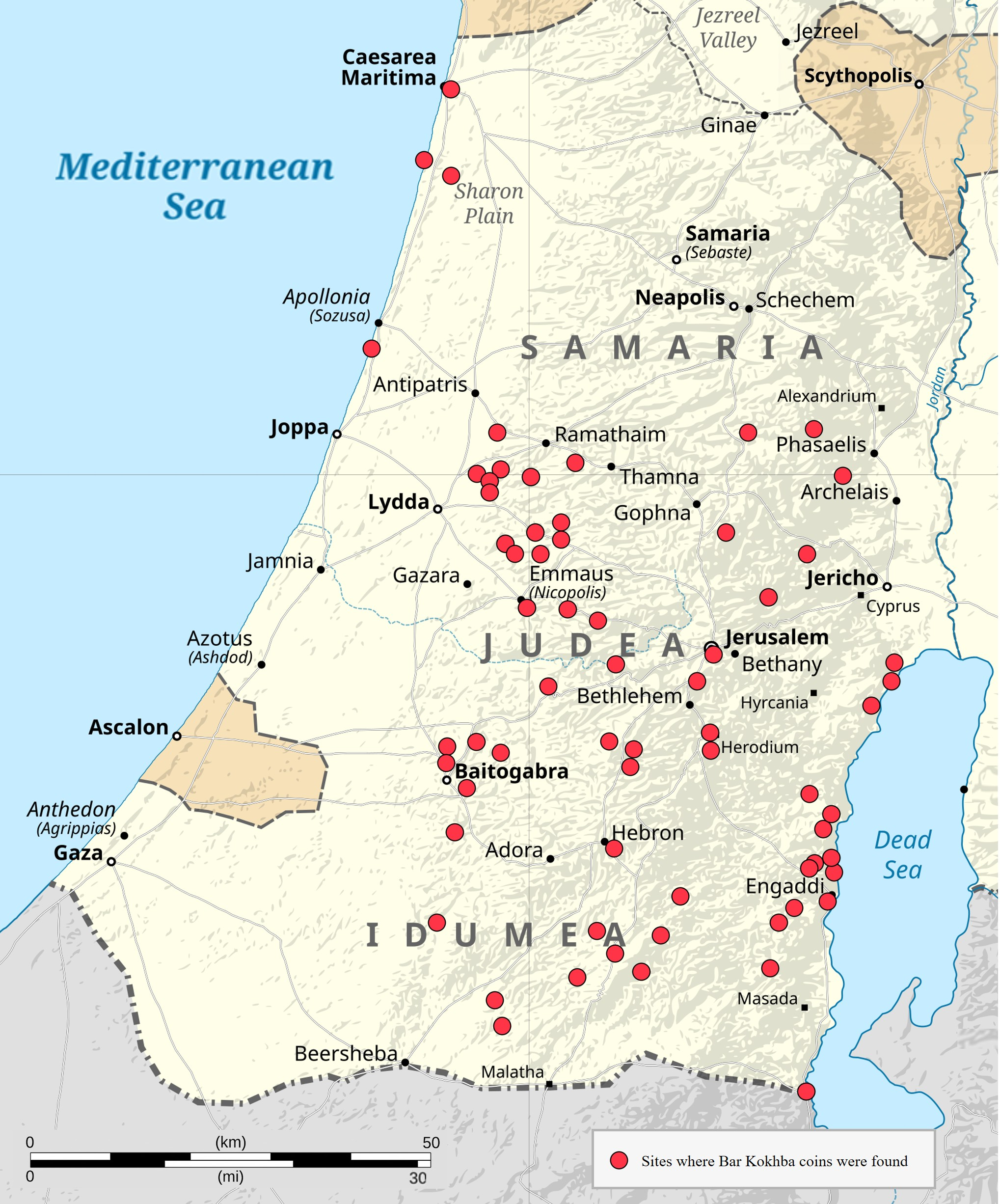
Geographic distribution of Bar Kokhba revolt coinage (2024)

==== Jerusalem ====
Several ancient sources (Note: Appian (Syr. 50); Justin Martyr (Dialogue with Tryphon, 108.3); Eusebius (Demonstrations of the Gospel, 6.18.10)) refer to the capture or destruction of Jerusalem under Hadrian, suggesting that fighting may have occurred there between Roman forces and rebels who may have held the site temporarily. Some scholars interpret the appearance of Jerusalem on Bar Kokhba coinage—through both imagery and slogans—as evidence of a rebel mint in the city, but it is more commonly understood as reflecting ideological aspirations.

The strongest evidence against a rebel takeover is the scarcity of supporting archaeological data. As of 2020, only four Bar Kokhba coins have been found within Jerusalem. On this basis, the Israel Antiquities Authority (IAA) maintains that the rebels never captured the city, citing the statistical disparity: of the more than 22,000 Bar Kokhba coins found across the region, only a negligible number originate from Jerusalem itself. IAA archaeologists Moran Hagbi and Joe Uziel have suggested that Roman soldiers may have brought coins to Jerusalem as souvenirs. The continued presence of Legio X Fretensis's camp in Jerusalem after the revolt indicates a sustained Roman military hold that would have been difficult for the rebels to dislodge.

==== Galilee ====
Most scholars agree that Galilee, a Jewish-majority district in northern Judaea, did not participate in the Bar Kokhba Revolt, in contrast to its involvement in the First Jewish Revolt, though the reasons remain unclear. The archaeological evidence is mixed: twenty underground complexes resembling those used by rebels in Judea have been identified in Galilee, yet no revolt coinage has been found there. The continuity of Jewish settlement after the revolt suggests either non-participation or early subjugation. Historian Haggai Olshanetsky has proposed that Galilee may have joined the revolt in its early stages but withdrew around 132/133, possibly due to opposition to Bar Kokhba's leadership or ideology.

The debate has been sustained by additional finds. Archaeological discoveries at Tel Shalem, a site in the upper Jordan Valley, have led researchers to identify it as a Roman fort active around the time of the revolt. The remains include a cuirassed bronze statue of Hadrian and a Latin inscription referencing a detachment of Legio VI Ferrata, suggesting the legion was stationed there during this period. In 1977, a further Latin inscription dedicated to Hadrian, probably originating from a triumphal arch, was found at the site. Gideon Foerster and Werner Eck have proposed that it came from an arch erected by the Senate following the revolt, with its location possibly reflecting a Roman victory in Galilee. Mor and Bowersock countered that it instead marked Hadrian's visit in 130, and Mor considered a Galilean battle implausible given the absence of revolt coinage and destruction layers there, as well as Galilee's geographic and logistical separation from Judea.

Some destruction layers near the Sea of Galilee have nonetheless been dated to the late first third of the 2nd century. One was found in the southern synagogue at Hammat Tiberias; another at Khirbet Wadi Hammam, dated to Hadrian's reign by a coin hoard, may reflect revolt-related fighting or earlier disturbances linked to the deployment of Legio VI Ferrata in the region during the 120s. Archaeologist Uzi Leibner has cautioned that further excavation is needed before conclusions can be drawn.

==== Perea ====
The region of Perea, in Transjordan, is also thought to have participated in the revolt, and evidence suggests that its Jewish settlements were affected during the conflict. Destruction and abandonment layers from early 2nd-century sites in Jordan such as Tel Abu al-Sarbut in the eastern Jordan River valley, Khirbet al-Mukhayyat, and Callirrhoe may reflect violence or displacement connected to the uprising. Additional evidence of Roman suppression includes a papyrus from 151 naming a veteran from Meason, interpreted as evidence of confiscated former Jewish land, and a 2nd-century inscription of Legio VI Ferrata at Gadara (now as-Salt). (Note: This view is also supported by a destruction layer in Tel Hesban that dates to 130, and a decline in settlement from the Early Roman to the Late Roman periods discovered in the survey of the Iraq al-Amir region.) Roman fortifications in the Jordan Valley dated to the Bar Kokhba period appears to have been positioned to target Jewish settlements in northern Perea.

==== Involvement of Jewish Christians ====
Christian sources accuse Bar Kokhba of persecuting Christians in Judea during the revolt. Justin Martyr, a 2nd-century Christian apologist, states in his First Apology (36.1) that Christians who refused to acknowledge Bar Kokhba's authority and join his cause were subjected to "dreadful torments". Eusebius (Chronicle of Hadrian, XVII) states that Christians suffered "all kinds of persecutions" and were killed by the rebels for refusing to support Bar Kokhba's campaign against Rome. Scholar David A. de Silva has noted that these accounts receive some support from Bar Kokhba's own letters, which reveal a readiness to employ violence even against his officers. Historian Shaye J. D. Cohen suggested that the persecution of Christian Jews may have stemmed from Bar Kokhba's messianic aspirations, observing that he "could not abide the messianic claims of another."

==== Foreign participation ====
Cassius Dio states that the Jewish rebels were aided by "many outside nations", who were eager "for gain". Menahem Mor suggested that non-Jewish populations in the region may have joined the revolt alongside the Jews, though their numbers are difficult to assess. He proposed that these participants were likely drawn from the lower classes in Hellenistic cities, motivated by a desire to undermine the Roman-backed aristocracy and improve their own socio-economic conditions.

The Samaritans, who inhabited neighboring Samaria, appear to have remained largely uninvolved in the revolt. Although some rabbinic sources portray Samaritans as obstructing Jewish efforts during the revolt, these accounts are generally regarded as legendary. Since later Samaritan chronicles mention Hadrian's reign but not the revolt, (Note: For example, in the early layer of the Tolidah, a medieval Samaritan chronicle, under the entry for the Samaritan High Priest Levi, Hadrian is presented as having captured "Cursed Shalem" (Jerusalem). He is then said to have erected an inscribed copper tablet in Shechem stating that no Jew was to dwell there, because his wife was a Samaritan from Yashuf.) Mor concluded that there is no evidence of Jewish–Samaritan cooperation. Their non-participation proved advantageous: after the revolt's suppression, the Samaritans expanded into former Jewish areas.

Historian Glen Bowersock proposed a connection between the Nabateans to the revolt, suggesting "a greater spread of hostilities than had formerly been thought... the extension of the Jewish revolt into northern Transjordan and an additional reason to consider the spread of local support among Safaitic tribes and even at Gerasa." He cited inscriptions at Gerasa (modern Jerash) in which the name of the provincial governor, Haterius Nepos, had been erased, interpreting this as a possible sign of local hostility in the aftermath of the revolt. He also cited a Safaitic graffito referring to a tribesman who "rebelled" for three years against "Nepos the tyrant", though he acknowledged the readings remain subject to interpretation.

== Preparations ==
=== Hiding complexes ===
Having drawn lessons from the spontaneous First Jewish Revolt, the rebels prepared extensively, waiting for Hadrian to leave the region. Dio writes that the rebels avoided open battle, relying instead on fortified strongholds connected by underground tunnels fitted with ventilation and light shafts, which allowed them to gather undetected and withdraw when threatened. A comparable description appears in Jerome (Commentary on Isaiah, 2.15): "and the citizens of Judea came to such distress that they, together with their wives, their children, their gold and their silver, in which they trusted, remained in underground tunnels and deepest caves."

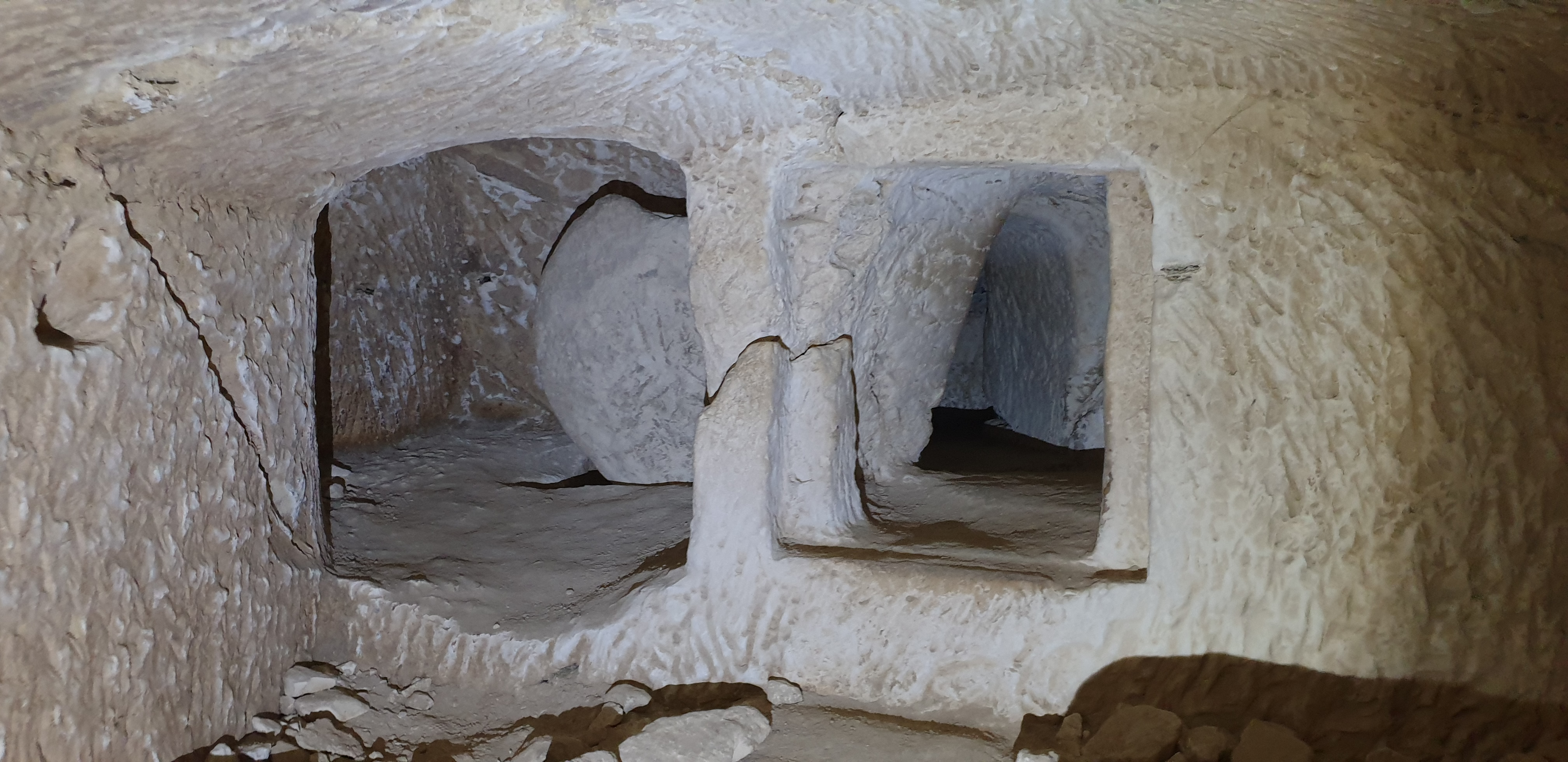
Underground hiding complex at Horvat 'Eton, featuring a sealed entrance mechanism

Hundreds of such hiding complexes, serving as civilian refuges and guerrilla bases, have been identified throughout Judea's populated areas. The complexes were created by modifying cisterns, ritual baths, and silos, and linking them through concealed tunnels and shafts. They featured hidden entrances, sharp turns, and locking mechanisms to hinder Roman troops. As of 2022, 439 complexes had been documented at 252 sites in Judea, of which 139 contain artifacts securely dated to the period between the end of the First Jewish Revolt and the conclusion of the Bar Kokhba Revolt (70–136). The absence of earlier artifacts suggests they were newly constructed in preparation for the revolt.

Approximately twenty hiding complexes resembling the revolt's well-developed systems have been identified in Galilee. Found at sites such as I'billin, 'Enot Sho'im, Kafr Kanna, and Khirbet Ruma, and occasionally containing 2nd-century material, these complexes suggest that parts of the local Jewish population were preparing for conflict.

=== Weaponry ===
Dio also stated that "the Jews [...] purposely made of poor quality such weapons as they were called upon to furnish, in order that the Romans might reject them and that they themselves might thus have the use of them." Archaeological evidence does not support this claim; weapons recovered from rebel-held sites are indistinguishable from standard Roman types.

=== Headquarters ===
The town of Betar (also rendered Beitar, Bethar, or Bether), situated on the edge of a ridge in the Judaean Mountains, was selected as the rebels' headquarters owing to its proximity to Jerusalem, its abundant springs, and its defensible position. Its ruins have been identified near the modern Palestinian village of Battir, which preserves the ancient name; the site is known in Hebrew as Tel Betar and in Arabic as Khirbet el-Yehud ("the ruin of the Jews"). It preserves archaeological evidence of the Roman siege. Excavations have uncovered fortifications attributed to Bar Kokhba's forces, though it remains uncertain whether they were built at the start of the revolt or later. Bar Kokhba's letters also show that the rebels used the Herodian palace-fortress of Herodium ("Herodis") as a regional headquarters and wheat supply depot.

== Outbreak and suppression campaign ==
The revolt probably erupted in the summer of 132. By that time, the rebels had established an independent state, and life in parts of Judaea appears to have continued with relative stability. (Note: This is evidenced by land lease agreements involving substantial financial transactions dating from the beginning of the revolt.) The conflict nevertheless disrupted communities beyond Judaea; documents record individuals fleeing from Zoar (east of the Dead Sea, in the province of Arabia) to Ein Gedi (on its western shore, in Judaea) shortly after the outbreak. The biblical phrase "House of Israel" may have served as the official designation for the communities under Bar Kokhba. (Note: That is suggested by the term's appearance in two contemporary documents and a post-revolt scroll dated to "Year 4 of the Destruction of the House of Israel.")

At the revolt's outset, the governor of Judaea, Quintus Tineius Rufus attempted to suppress the uprising but appears to have suffered a humiliating defeat. In its aftermath, the legate of Syria, Gaius Poblicius Marcellus, was dispatched to stabilize the region until a larger force could be assembled.

Emperor Hadrian subsequently deployed several of his most capable military commanders to suppress the rebellion. Chief among them was Sextus Julius Severus, who was transferred from his post as governor of Britannia. He appears to have arrived in Judaea during the first half of 133. This transfer was highly irregular: the reassignment from a major military command such as Britain to a relatively minor province as Judaea suggests a state of emergency. Although Dio names only Severus, his use of the plural "generals" implies that additional senior commanders may have held independent commands, and several received the ornamenta triumphalia, a rare military honor in this period. Hadrian himself participated in the campaign for a time, as attested by Dio and by inscriptions referring to an Expeditio Iudaica involving the emperor.

Rome assembled a massive force drawn from across the empire, with at least nine legions contributing either full formations or detachments (vexillationes). Two of these legions—Legio X Fretensis and Legio VI Ferrata—were already stationed in Judaea at the time of the conflict. Reinforcements arrived from neighboring regions, including Legio III Cyrenaica from Bostra in Arabia, and Legio V Gallica from Syria. (Note: It is possible that Titus Haterius Nepos, the governor of Arabia, was personally involved in the fighting.) Since the consular legate of Syria, Gaius Poblicius Marcellus, departed his province to lead troops into Judaea, it is likely that other units from Syria were involved. Further emergency measures include the transfer of marines from the classis Misenensis, a senior fleet of the Roman navy, into Legio X Fretensis, which required granting them Roman citizenship, and the conscription of soldiers in Italy and the Alpine provinces—regions not typically used for recruitment in this period. Hadrian also appointed a tribune from a legion in Pannonia to bring additional detachment.

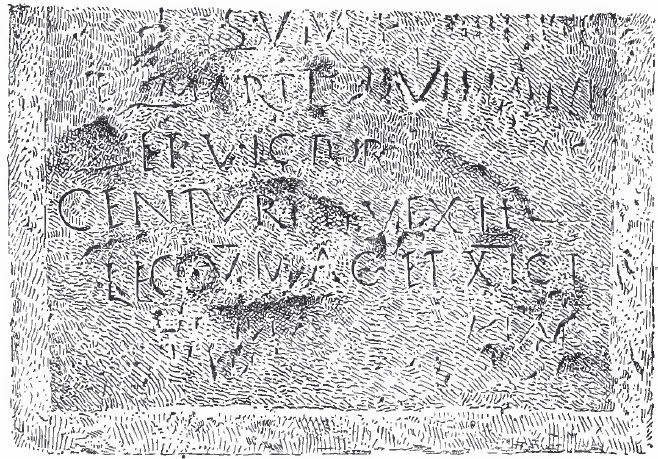
Roman inscription found in Battir mentioning Legio V and Legio XI

The geographic distribution of Bar Kokhba coinage confirms that the rebels maintained a presence in most areas of Judea into the revolt's third year. Roman forces are known to have deployed ballistas at several sites, including Herodium, Betar, Horvat Tzifion, and Horvat Ba'alan. At Herodium, tunnels bear evidence of major fires and destruction, likely resulting from Roman assaults during the revolt's final phase.

== Siege and fall of Betar ==
Bar Kokhba and his remaining forces withdrew to Betar, which came under siege in summer 135. The defenders hastily erected a wall around the settlement using earth fill and reused structures. The Romans encircled Betar with a siege wall and two camps to the south, likely cutting off access to the main spring. They stormed the site without requiring a siege ramp.

Artifacts from Betar include slingstones, arrowheads of a type known from Bar Kokhba-era contexts in the Judaean Desert, and pottery dating to the first and second centuries CE. A concentration of 22 slingstones was found in situ on a tower roof, and their crude manufacture suggests they were produced quickly during the siege. They were stockpiled atop the wall by the defenders, and not all were used before the battle ended. A stone inscription bearing Latin characters, discovered at a nearby spring, mentions detachments from Legio V Macedonica and Legio XI Claudia. The inscription suggests that both legions, normally stationed in the Balkans, participated in the siege. No post-revolt occupation layers were identified, suggesting the site was abandoned following the Roman assault.

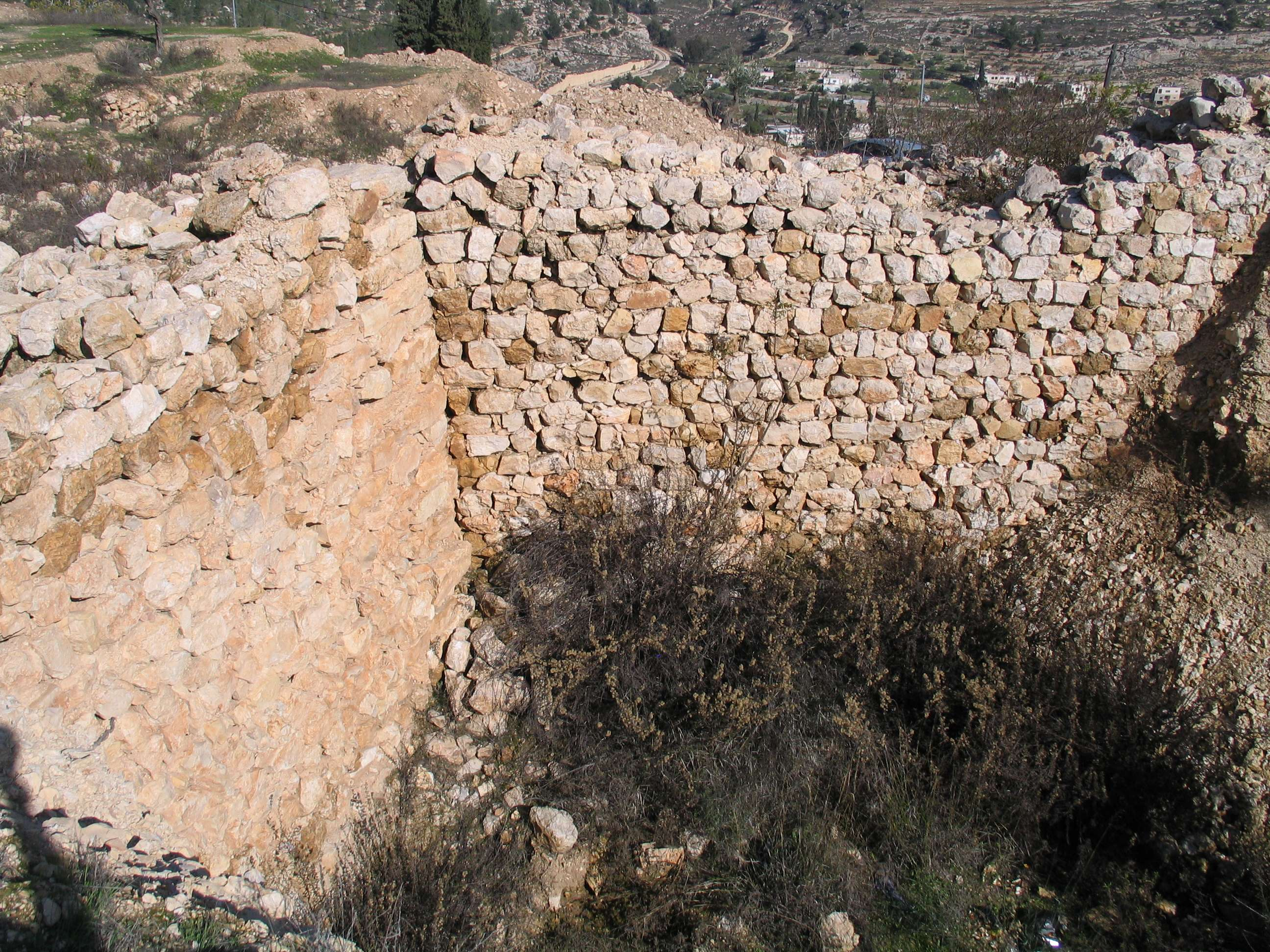
Fortification at Betar, Bar Kokhba's last stand

According to Jewish tradition, Betar was breached and destroyed on Tisha B'Av, (Note: The ninth day of the Hebrew month of Av.) the same day commemorating the destruction of the Jerusalem Temple. (Note: Mishnah, Ta'anit, IV, 6; Babylonian Talmud, Ta'anit, 29a) The Jerusalem Talmud (Taanit 4.5) and Lamentations Rabbah (2.5) describe the bloodshed at Betar as immense: the Romans "went about slaughtering them until a horse sunk in blood up to its nostrils, and the blood carried away boulders that weighted forty sela until it went four miles into the sea", despite the town being "forty miles distant from the sea".

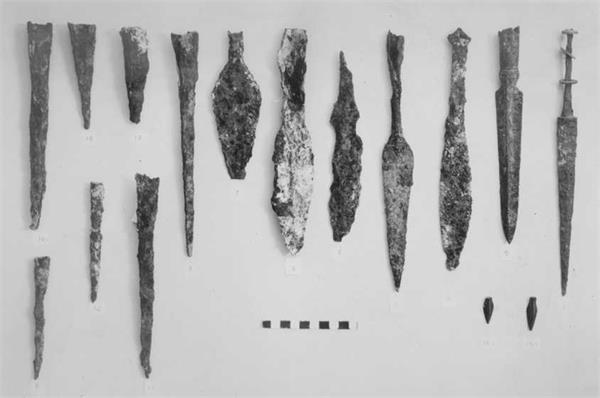
Weapons found at the ruins of Betar

The fall of Betar effectively ended the Roman campaign in Judea's hill country, though the war continued as Roman forces pursued remaining rebels in other regions. According to Lamentations Rabbah (51), Hadrian established three guard posts–in Hammat, Bethlehem, and Kefar Lekitaya—to intercept Jewish rebels attempting to flee. He dispatched heralds announcing that Jews in hiding should come out to receive a reward. Those who complied were surrounded and killed in the Valley of Beit Rimmon. (Note: The identification of these locations has been the subject of scholarly debate. Kefar Lekitaya has been identified by some with Khirbet al-Kut, near Ma'ale Levona, while others associate it with Beit Liqya, located along the Emmaus–Jerusalem road. Hammat has been variously proposed to correspond to Hamat Gader in the Galilee or Hammata near Emmaus in Judea. Similarly, the Valley of Bet Rimmon has been located either in the Lower Galilee, near Wadi Ramana, or in Judea, near the village of Rimon, south of Ba'al-hazor.) Historian William Horbury has suggested that these posts marked the boundary of the area surrounding Jerusalem from which Jews were henceforth excluded.

== Mop-up operations ==
In the revolt's later phases, refugees sought shelter in large natural caverns on high, nearly inaccessible cliffs in the Judaean Desert overlooking the Dead Sea and the Jordan Valley. Drawing on the First Jewish Revolt, they assumed isolated desert caves offered better survival prospects than open battle, a calculation that underestimated Roman persistence, which continued for months after Betar's fall. Roman forces besieged roughly half these caves, building camps above them to cut off supplies and force surrender through starvation. Skeletal remains and arrowheads indicate that some died of hunger and thirst, while others were killed in assaults. A legend in Lamentations Rabbah (1.45) recounts Jews trapped in a cave who, in desperation, resorted to cannibalism; one son unknowingly ate his father and cried, "Woe to me! I have eaten the flesh of my father."

More than thirty refuge caves have been identified across three zones: the Dead Sea escarpment, the central Judaean Desert, and the western Judaean Mountains. Excavations have uncovered materials well preserved by the arid climate of the Judaean Desert, including documents that shed light on the revolt as well as the period's languages, culture, and legal practices. Personal belongings such as property deeds, keys, and luxury items, suggest the refugees intended to return to their homes. Additional finds include pottery, textiles, glassware, wooden artifacts, leather sandals, and food remains, which provide insight into aspects of daily life. Religious items such as biblical scrolls, remains of Tefillin, and fragments of a Mezuzah scroll were also found. Some scrolls showed evidence of intentional tearing, possibly by Roman soldiers.

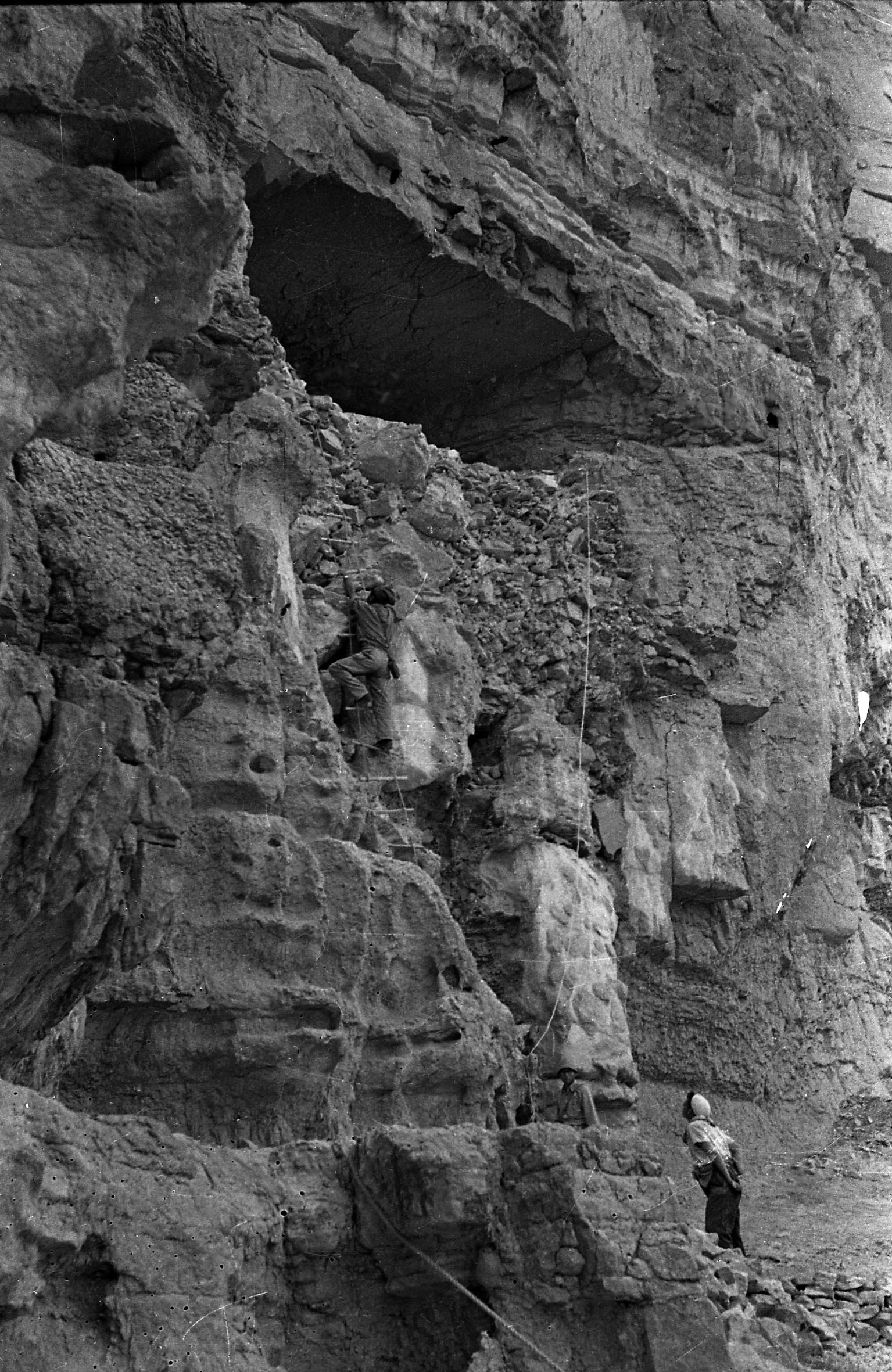
The Cave of Letters, where several documents of the period, including letters from Shimon bar Kokhba to the people of Ein Gedi, were discovered

The caves at Naḥal Ḥever, a canyon near the Dead Sea, are especially significant. Among these is the Cave of Horrors, named for the dozens of skeletons found within, including those of children and infants. The nearby Cave of Letters yielded the documents of two Jewish women, Babatha and Salome Komaise, documenting property sales, marriage contracts, gifts, and legal disputes that shed light on women's rights of the period. The same cave, along with those at Wadi Murabba'at, yielded the "Bar Kokhba letters", at least 23 missives exchanged between the leader and his subordinates. These letters reflect a multilingual population and suggest non-Jewish auxiliaries served in the rebel ranks. Another cave, the Cave of the Swords, was home to swords and a javelin believed to have been captured from Roman soldiers and hidden there by Jewish rebels for future use.

How long the Roman campaign continued after Betar's fall in the summer of 135 is not entirely clear. Historian Lester L. Grabbe presents Betar's fall as the decisive collapse of the revolt, giving it a duration of about three years. The Jerusalem Talmud (Ta'anit 4.8, 68d) puts the revolt at three and a half years, though Grabbe cautioned that this may be a stereotypical figure. He also noted that no documents securely dated to a "Year 4" or later have been found, leaving open the possibility that the revolt ended in late summer 135, while suggesting that some remaining leaders may not have been tracked down until the winter of 136. Historian Werner Eck, however, argued that the revolt likely ended in early 136. He argued that Hadrian accepted his second acclamation as imperator only after the final Roman victory; since the title cannot be securely attested in 135, and some official inscriptions from 136 still omit it, he concluded that Hadrian probably did not take it before 136, suggesting that the war ended only in early 136. Archaeologist Boaz Zissu likewise argued that the conflict persisted at least until January 136.

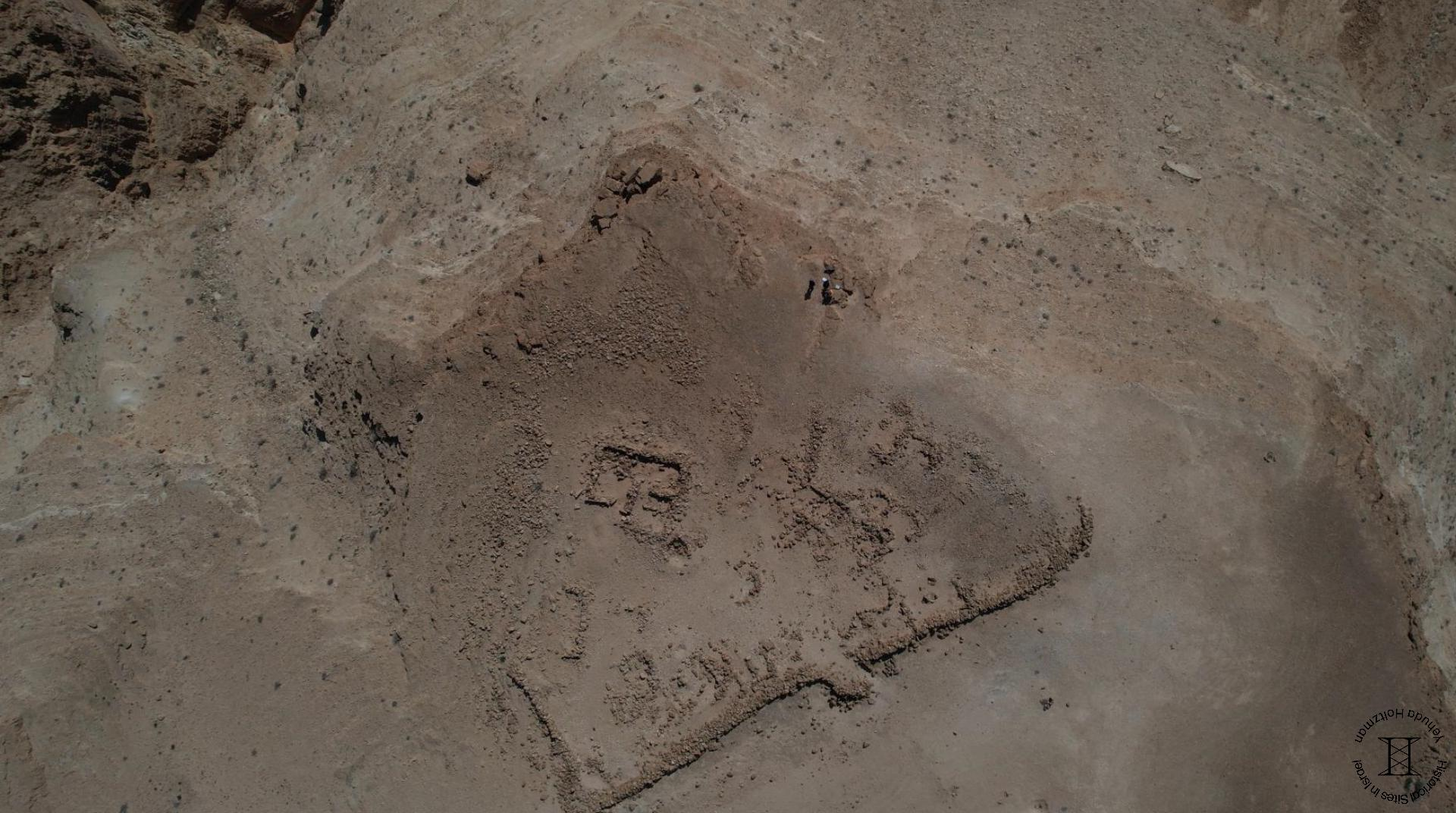
Aerial view of the Roman siege camp situated on the cliff above the Cave of Letters, a refuge cave in the Judaean Desert

== Consequences and aftermath ==
=== Devastation and demographic collapse ===
The revolt had catastrophic consequences for the Jewish population of Judea, resulting in massive loss of life, widespread enslavement, and extensive forced displacement. The scale of devastation surpassed that of the First Jewish–Roman War, leaving Judea proper in a state of desolation. Archaeologist Shimon Applebaum estimated that about two-thirds of Judaea's Jewish population died in the revolt. (Note: Moshe David Herr wrote that the Jewish share of the region's population declined from about two-thirds to between one-half and three-fifths, marking the first time since the Hasmonean period that the Jewish majority was at risk.) Some scholars have characterized the Roman suppression campaign as an act of genocide.

Cassius Dio, writing several decades after the revolt, described the scale of destruction as follows: "50 of their most important outposts and 985 of their most famous villages were razed to the ground. 580,000 men were slain in the various raids and battles, and the number of those that perished by famine, disease and fire was past finding out, Thus nearly the whole of Judaea was made desolate." (Note: Eusebius, Roman History, LXIX 14.1–2. Talmudic sources (cf. Lamentations Rabbah, 2:4) refer to 52 or 54 battles waged by Hadrian.) Peter Schäfer suggested the figures may have been inflated to magnify the scale of Roman achievement and account for the war's heavy losses, though he noted that even if exaggerated, "the casualties amongst the population and the destruction inflicted on the country would have been considerable." Other scholars have defended the figures' plausibility. In 2003, classicist Hannah Cotton described Dio's numbers as highly plausible in light of Roman census declarations. In 2021, an ethno-archaeological comparative analysis by archaeologists Dvir Raviv and Chaim Ben David concluded that Dio's figures are consistent with archaeological evidence for catastrophic depopulation, and that he wrote a "reliable account, which he based on contemporaneous documentation." (Note: Raviv and Ben David's study defends the reliability of Cassius Dio's account using archaeological evidence from Judea, Transjordan, and the Galilee, and combining three research methods: ethno-archaeological comparison with Ottoman-period settlement patterns, parallel settlement studies in the Galilee and analysis of Middle Roman Period sites (70–136 CE), and determines that the account is likely accurate.)

Archaeological excavations in Judea have revealed widespread destruction layers and abandonment deposits dating to the revolt period, found in both above-ground structures and underground installations, including hiding complexes, burial caves, and storage facilities. These findings attest to the near-total eradication of Jewish settlement in the Judea region, with no site yet revealing a continuous occupation layer throughout the 2nd century. The evidence consistently shows devastation or depopulation within the first few decades of the century, followed by prolonged abandonment. While most pronounced in Judea, more limited signs of destruction have also been identified in Galilee and Transjordan. Tannaitic literature reflects the devastation through expressions such as "Who sees the towns of Judea in their destruction..." and "When Judea was destroyed, may it soon be rebuilt."

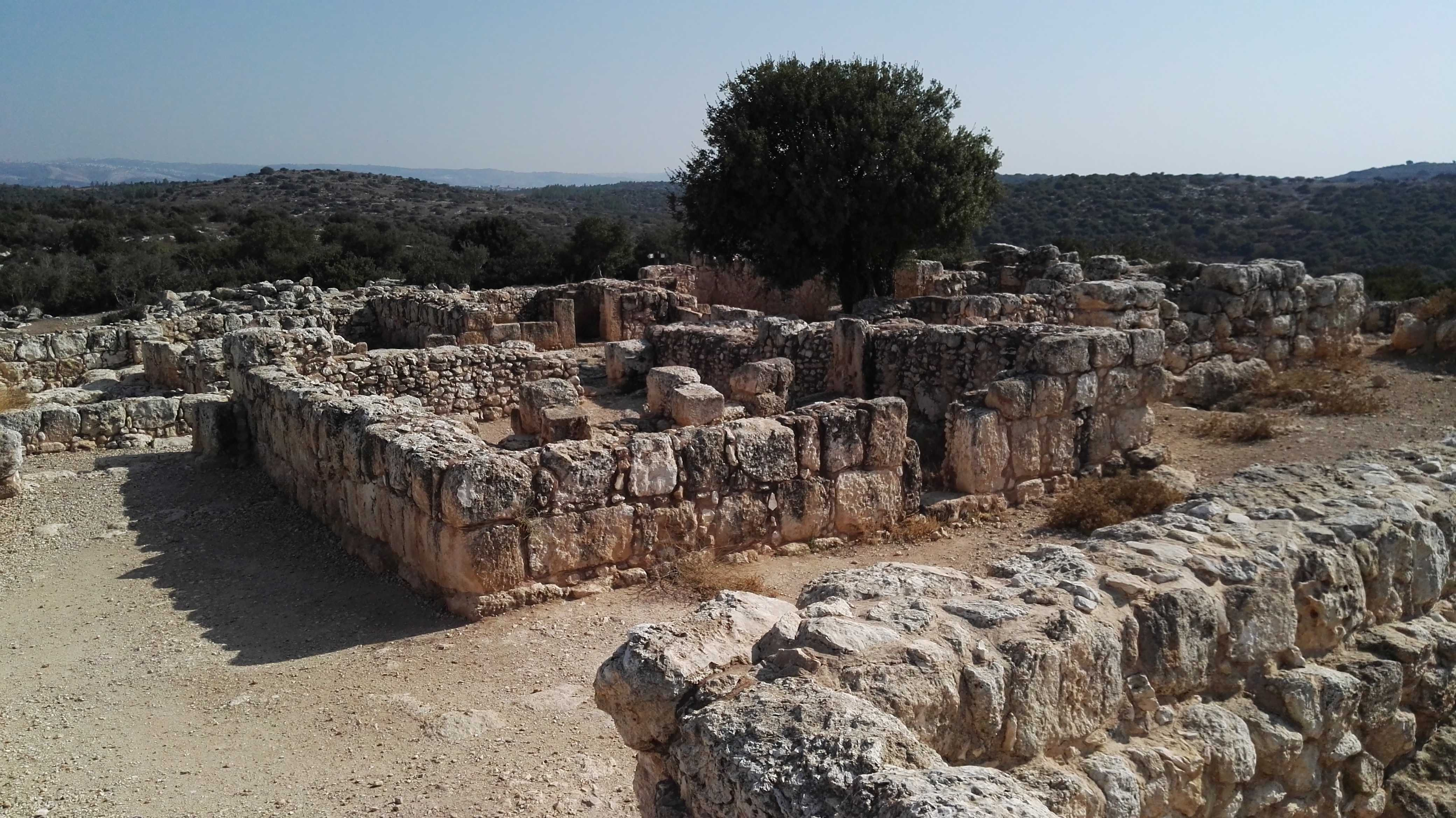
The ruins of Horvat 'Ethri display a destruction layer dating to the revolt, along with a mass grave containing the remains of 15 individuals, including one with signs of beheading.

Excavations at specific sites illustrate the scale of destruction. At Horvat 'Ethri, a destruction layer dating to the revolt was uncovered alongside a mass grave found within a Jewish ritual bath (mikveh), containing the remains of 15 individuals, one of whom exhibited cut marks consistent with beheading by sword. At Khirbet Badd 'Isa and other Jewish villages, the pattern is similar: destruction or depopulation during the revolt, followed by a settlement gap and reoccupation no earlier than the 3rd century. The new inhabitants were typically non-Jews, as reflected in their distinct material culture differing significantly from that of the earlier Jewish population. Towns such as Gophna and Beit Nattif, known to have been Jewish before the revolt, similarly show evidence of Hellenistic and Roman pagan culture in the Late Roman period.

=== Displacement and enslavement ===
Jewish survivors faced harsh punitive measures from the Romans, who frequently employed social engineering to stabilize conflict zones. Jews were expelled from Jerusalem and the surrounding district, encompassing nearly the entire traditional region of Judea. Nicole Belayche described the exclusion zone as extending from the area of Neapolis (modern Nablus) in the north to Jericho in the east, and Mor wrote that Jews were expelled from the districts of Gophna, Herodium, and Aqraba.

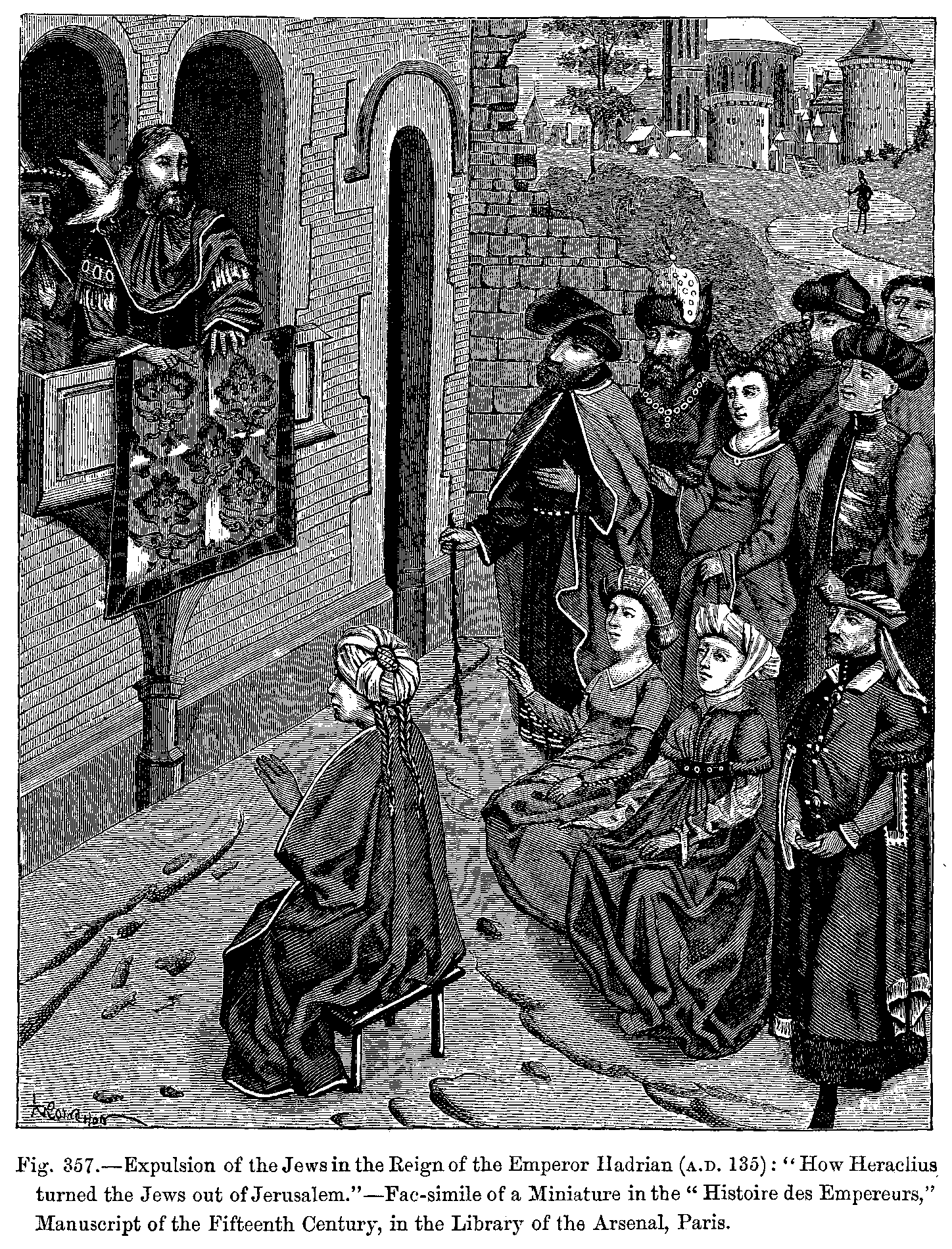
Expulsion of the Jews from Jerusalem during the reign of Hadrian. A miniature from the 15th-century manuscript "Histoire des Empereurs".

The Church Fathers provide accounts of this exclusion. Eusebius stated that "all the families of the Jewish nation have suffered pain [...] because God's hand has struck them, delivering their mother-city over to strange nations, laying their Temple low, and driving them from their country, to serve their enemies in a hostile land." (Note: Eusebius, Demonstratio Evangelica, VIII, 4, 23;) Jerome similarly wrote: "in Hadrian's reign, when Jerusalem was completely destroyed and the Jewish nation was massacred in large groups at a time, with the result that they were even expelled from the borders of Judaea." (Note: Jerome, Commentary on Daniel (translation by Gleason L. Archer), III, ix, 24) He elaborated that Hadrian "commanded that by a legal decree and ordinances the whole nation should be absolutely prevented from entering from thenceforth even the district round Jerusalem, so that it could not even see from a distance its ancestral home." Jerome also specified that Jews were permitted entry only once annually, on Tisha B'Av, to mourn the Temple's destruction—a privilege for which payment was required.

Roman policy involved mass enslavement and deportation of captives, as also documented after the Salassi revolt (25 BCE), the Raeti wars (15 BCE), and a rebellion in Illyricum (c. 12 BCE). The slave market was reportedly flooded with Jewish captives, who were sold into slavery and dispersed across the empire, significantly expanding the Jewish diaspora. The 7th-century Chronicon Paschale, drawing on earlier sources, states that Hadrian sold Jewish captives "for the price of a daily portion of food for a horse." Historian William V. Harris estimated that more than 100,000 Jews were enslaved, calling this "only definite instance of over-supply ... in this period of Roman slavery."

In his Commentary on Jeremiah (6.18.5–6), Jerome reported that "innumerable people of diverse ages and both sexes were sold at the marketplace of Terebinthus" in Hebron, adding that "for this reason it is an accursed thing among the Jews to visit this acclaimed marketplace." In the Commentary on Zechariah (3.11), he notes that thousands were sold at this site; those not sold were transported to Gaza for auction, while many others were relocated to Egypt and other regions, where "they were lost either when their ships drowned or by the swords of the gentiles." In his Commentary on Obadiah (20.21), Jerome recorded a Jewish tradition that Hadrian settled Jewish captives in the Cimmerian Bosporus, a client kingdom of Rome spanning eastern Crimea and the Taman Peninsula. (Note: Two Sephardic Jewish families, Rodriguez and Gradis, are traditionally said to have emigrated from Judaea to the Iberian Peninsula following the Bar Kokhba Revolt, settling first in Portugal and later moving to Spain.)

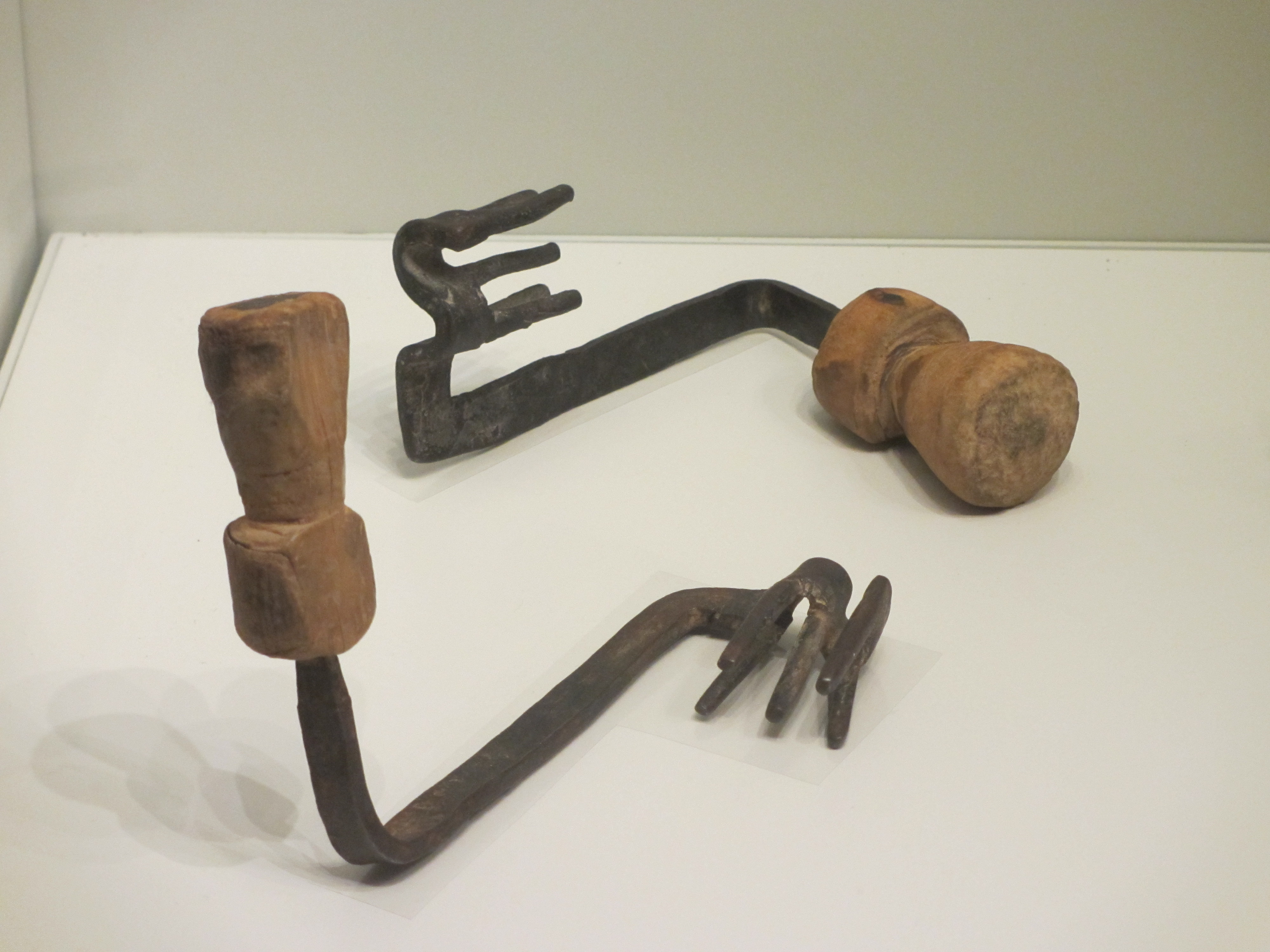
House keys taken by Jewish refugees to the Cave of the Letters

The war also produced a large wave of refugees, some of whom settled among the Jewish community in Babylonia, contributing to its spiritual development in the following centuries. The displacement is also attested in Dialogue with Trypho, a 2nd-century Christian apologetic work by Justin Martyr, which describes a conversation between the author and a Jewish fugitive living in Corinth, Greece. In response to post-revolt emigration, rabbinic teachings sought to discourage departure from the Land of Israel. A passage in the Tosefta (Avodah Zarah 4:3), a compilation of rabbinic texts from the late 2nd century, states that one should live in the Land of Israel "even in a town where the majority of inhabitants are gentiles", rather than abroad, even "in a town where all the inhabitants are Jews." A teaching recurring in this section of the Tosefta and in Sifrei Devarim (80:4) declares that "living in the Land of Israel is equivalent to all the other commandments of the Torah." (Note: Yet, some rabbis who upheld this view are also recorded as holding communal leadership roles in Nisibis, Rome, and Babylonia.)

=== Religious suppression ===
Following the revolt, Hadrian implemented religious decrees aimed at dismantling Jewish nationalism in Judaea, (Note: Historian Moshe David Herr explains that Hadrian's decrees did not aim to abolish Judaism, but rather targeted its nationalist elements while permitting unrelated practices such as dietary laws and the rejection of idolatry. Talmudic scholar Saul Lieberman argued that the decrees were not issued all at once, but evolved gradually and aligned with standard Roman practices toward rebellious provinces.) the first since the decrees of Antiochus IV in 168/7 BCE. These included bans on Torah study and the Hebrew calendar; sages were executed and sacred texts publicly burned. Hadrian desecrated the ruins of the Temple by erecting statues of Jupiter and himself on the site. These measures remained in force until his death in 138, after which conditions improved somewhat.

This period of repression left a lasting imprint on rabbinic memory, traditionally termed a time of shemad (שְׁמָד), meaning "destruction" or "desolation". Rabbinic texts append a curse to Hadrian's name: "may his bones rot". In the Tosefta (Sotah 15:10), the 2nd-century sage Rabbi Ishmael likened Hadrian's decrees to a "second destruction" intended to "uproot the Torah" from Israel. Jewish resistance manifested as both covert observance and open defiance, often leading to martyrdom—a theme that would recur throughout Jewish history. The Babylonian Talmud describes several accounts of this defiance: Rabbi Akiva was flayed with iron combs for teaching Torah, dying while reciting the Shema, Judaism's central declaration of faith (Berakhot 61b); Judah ben Bava was martyred after secretly ordaining new rabbis (Sanhedrin 14a); and Shimon bar Yochai and his son were forced to hide in a cave for twelve years to escape execution (Shabbat 33b). These events were eventually codified in halakhic, midrashic and liturgical literature, specifically the story of the Ten Martyrs, which remains an emblem of Jewish martyrdom.

=== Linguistic changes ===
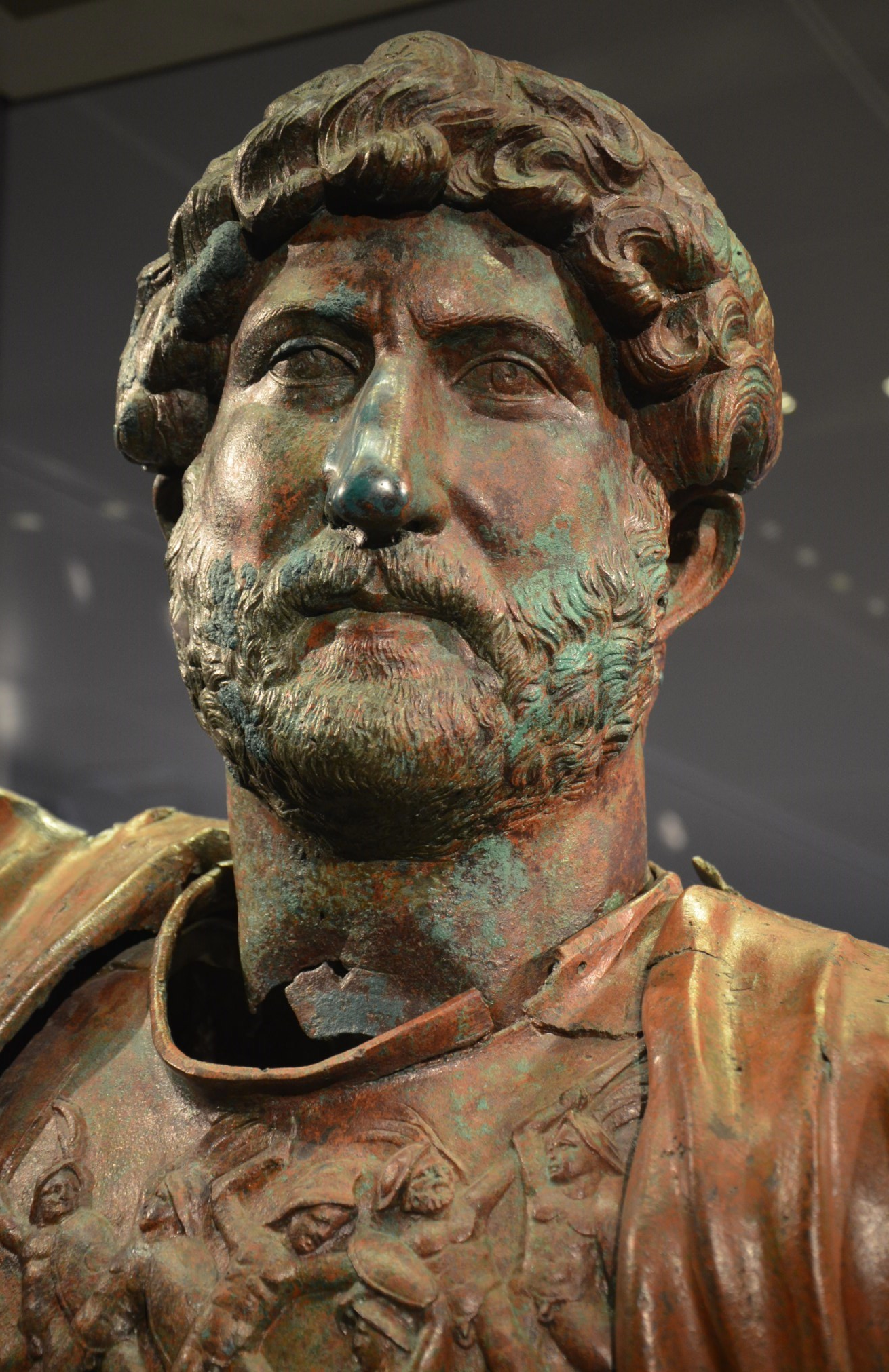
Bust of Hadrian found near Beit She'an. Rabbinic texts append a curse to his name: “may his bones rot.”

The revolt appears to have constituted a linguistic rupture, effectually ending the role of Hebrew as a spoken vernacular. Although Aramaic was already predominant, Hebrew remained a living language for much of Judea's Jewish population until the revolt, after which it largely disappeared from daily use. While some scholarly circles from southern Judea continued to maintain it as a spoken tongue, 3rd-century records indicate that even sages had difficulty recognizing certain Hebrew terms. The Jerusalem Talmud and classical Midrashim—both predominantly Aramaic—confirm that in later antiquity, Hebrew had transitioned into a strictly literary and liturgical language.

=== Confiscation of lands and resettlement ===
Following the revolt, the Romans appear to have confiscated lands that had either reverted to Jewish control during the inter-revolt period, or had been appropriated by the rebel state. This policy, echoing measures taken by Vespasian after the First Jewish Revolt, is suggested by Eusebius' reference to the "enslavement" of Jewish territory in the revolt's aftermath. Rabbinic literature also refers to "Hadrian's vineyard", a vineyard in Galilee said to stretch from Tiberias to Sepphoris, its boundaries marked by the bodies of those killed at Betar. Smallwood suggested that this tradition may symbolize widespread land confiscations and the establishment of Roman estates in the region.

To address the resulting dispossession, the rabbis instituted sikarikon laws to facilitate the reacquisition of confiscated land. Under traditional Jewish law, original owners retained title to seized property, which impeded its recovery or resale. By relaxing these constraints, the rabbis created a pragmatic mechanism for Jews to purchase land from Roman authorities or subsequent holders. While rabbinic sources describing these laws refer only to a generic "War", scholars generally associate this legislation with the Bar Kokhba Revolt, as the rulings distinguish between Galilee and the heavily devastated Judea.

Artistic, epigraphic, and numismatic evidence indicates that Roman authorities resettled post-revolt Judea with a diverse population comprising several sources. Aelia Capitolina, administrative centers, and sites along major roads were settled by army veterans and immigrants from the empire's western provinces. The rural countryside of Judea was repopulated by migrants from the coastal plain and neighboring provinces, such as Syria, Phoenicia, and Arabia, along with settlers from the western part of the empire. Originally pagan, this population gradually adopted Christianity during the Byzantine period, contributing to its rise in the region during late antiquity. The Samaritans also benefited from the Jewish decline; they expanded from Samaria into northern Judea, the coastal plain, and the Beit She'an Valley. This expansion is reflected in the Jerusalem Talmud (Kiddushin, 4, 65c; Yevamot, 8, 9d), where Rabbi Abbahu notes that thirteen towns were settled by Samaritans during the period of anti-Jewish persecution. (Note: The Samaritan expansion also affected the areas around Lod and Emmaus, which developed into mixed settlement zones inhabited by Jews, Samaritans, and other groups. According to Mor, the expansion of the Samaritans into formerly Jewish areas also resulted in increased proximity and economic competition between the two populations. Consequently, the Jewish sages altered their perception of the Samaritans, classifying them as strangers.)

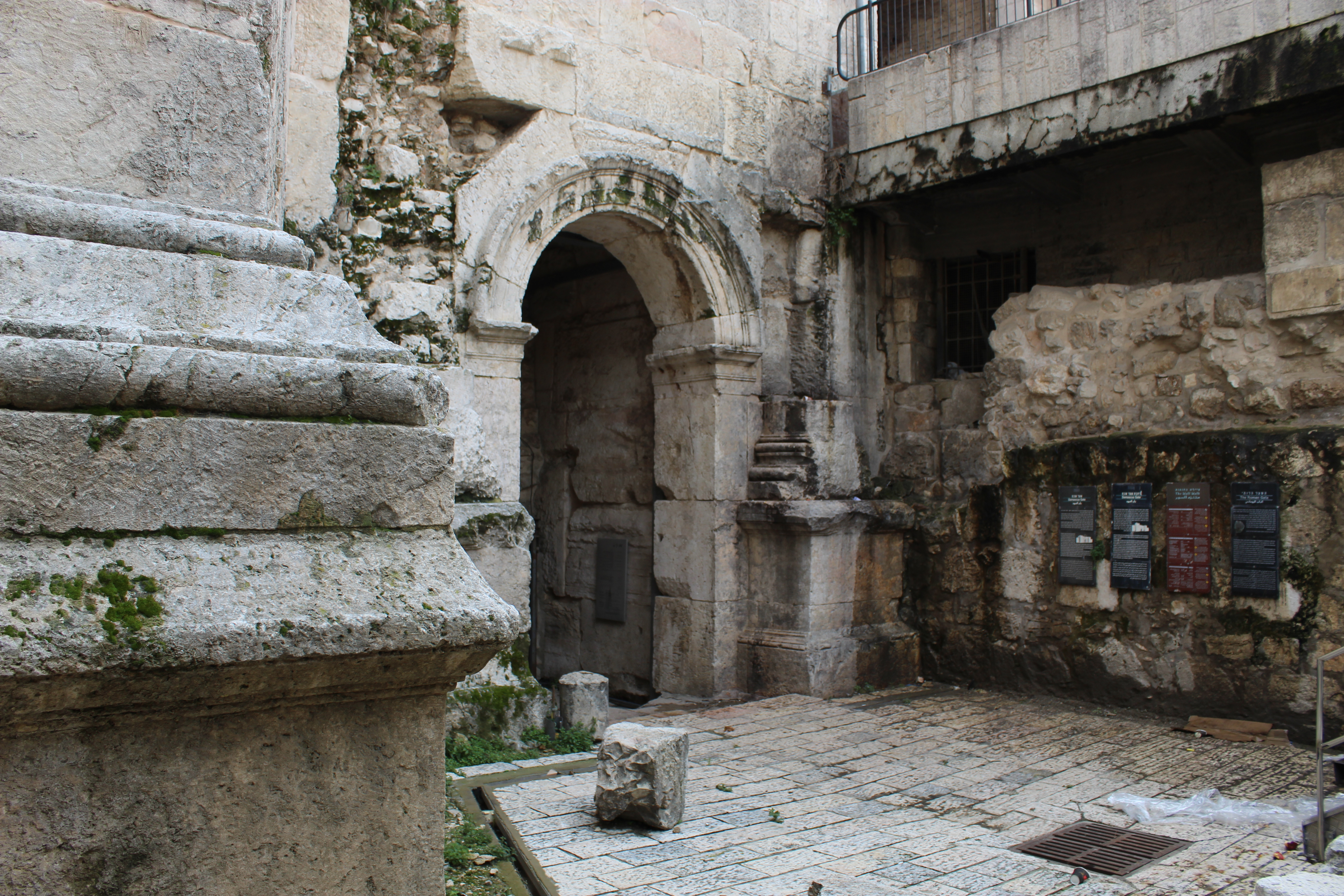
Late Roman-era gate beneath the Damascus Gate in Jerusalem

Following the displacement of the Jewish population, the rural hinterland of Jerusalem remained largely devoid of traditional villages for centuries. Facing difficulties resettling the depopulated villages surrounding the city, the authorities reorganized much of the territory into large agricultural estates managed by elites and, eventually, during the Byzantine period, by monasteries. During the late Roman period, the hinterland of Jerusalem underwent a process of Romanization through veteran resettlement. Evidence includes a legionary tomb at Manahat, the ruins of Roman villas at Ein Yael, Khirbet er-Ras, Rephaim Valley and Ramat Rachel, and the kilns of Legio X Fretensis discovered near Givat Ram. Evidence of land confiscation and Roman veteran resettlement is also attested in Transjordan. Similar markers of veteran presence appear elsewhere in Judea, such as a marble Dionysus sarcophagus at Turmus Ayya, a Latin-inscribed tombstone at Khirbet Tibnah, and a statue of Minerva at Khirbat al-Mafjar. Additional finds include a centurion's tomb at Beit Nattif containing a statuette of Aphrodite and a Roman-style mansion with Western architectural elements at Arak el-Khala, near Beit Guvrin. The immigration of neighboring populations is attested by Oriental-style ceramic figurines found at Ben Shemen and Gezer, Phoenician-style burial architecture at Beit Jimal, Nabataean-style sculpture at Mamre, and the Mazor Mausoleum.

=== Roman military losses ===
Roman casualties were significant. Cassius Dio wrote that many of them were killed, so much that Hadrian, in reporting to the Roman Senate, omitted the customary greeting: "all is well with me and the legions" — an admission that things were not entirely well. The severity of Roman losses is further reflected in a letter of 162 by the orator Fronto to Emperor Marcus Aurelius, written after a setback in Armenia. Seeking to console the emperor, Fronto recalled: "Again, under the rule of your grandfather Hadrian, what a number of soldiers were killed by the Jews, what a number by the Britons!" (Note: The Correspondence of Marcus Cornelius Fronto – De Bello Parthico, 2 (translation by C. R. Haines))

While Legio X Fretensis is known to have sustained casualties, the fate of two other legions remains a subject of scholarly debate. Around the period of the Bar Kokhba revolt, Legio XXII Deiotariana disappeared from Roman military records; the unit was last documented in Egypt in 119. Scholars including Michael Avi-Yonah, Edward Luttwak, Werner Eck, and Mary E. Smallwood have attributed this disappearance to the revolt, suggesting the unit was decimated early in the conflict. Benjamin Isaac and Israel Roll argued that an erased name on an aqueduct inscription at Caesarea represents a damnatio memoriae (official erasure from historical records), following a military catastrophe involving this legion. Mor, however, suggested the unit may have been disbanded earlier, following civil unrest in Alexandria in 121–122.

The disappearance of the Legio IX Hispana has also been associated with the Bar Kokhba Revolt. (Note: Previously, it was believed that the legion was disbanded following significant losses during an uprising in Britain in 119 CE, but the discovery of tile stamps by J. E. Bogares at Nijmegen indicates the unit was actually stationed in Germania Superior throughout the 120s.) Historian Eric Birley proposed the legion was destroyed by rebels after joining Julius Severus's expedition in Judaea. Mor countered that the rebels were likely too weakened to annihilate an entire legion by the time Severus arrived in 134. He argued the unit survived the revolt, citing a 161 military diploma that mentions an individual who served as tribune in the legion as late as 140. (Note: Menachem Mor wrote that while the legion's dissolution may be linked to the military disaster at Elegeia in 161 CE, there is currently no evidence to definitively confirm this theory.)

=== Renaming of Judaea to Syria Palaestina ===
A further, more enduring consequence of the revolt was the official renaming of the province. Judaea—whose name derived from the Latin Iudaei and carried an unmistakable ethnic association with the Jewish people—was renamed Syria Palaestina, a designation ultimately derived from the long-extinct Philistines, who had inhabited mainly the coastal region during the Iron Age before disappearing from the historical record. The name Palaestina was already in prior use; Greek writers had used it to describe areas in the southern Levant since at least Herodotus in the 5th century BCE.

The prevailing scholarly view is that the renaming constituted a deliberate punitive act intended to erase the memory of ancient Israel and Judea and to sever the region's historical association with the Jewish people. Although the Romans renamed provinces on other occasions, this instance is notable as the only recorded case in which a province's name was changed specifically in response to a rebellion—a measure not taken after revolts in provinces such as Britannia or Germania. Historian Seth Schwartz stated that the name was intended to "celebrate the de-Judaization of the province." Classicist Louis Feldman wrote that the aim was to "obliterate the Jewish character of the land, with the name of the nearest tribe being applied to the entire area." Cotton described the change as "a kind of damnatio memoriae: Judaea was air-brushed out of the map of Roman provinces."

Archaeologist David Jacobson has offered a dissenting interpretation, characterizing the renaming as an attempt to rationalize provincial nomenclature. He argued that because "Judaea" originally denoted only Judea proper and was applied to the larger region only after Hasmonean territorial expansion, the Romans sought a more appropriate name for the larger political entity. Eck argued that while Rome occasionally renamed provinces for administrative reasons, this is the only documented case in which a provincial name was changed in response to a rebellion. Provinces that experienced serious revolts, including Britannia and Germania, retained their names. Eck further rejected the explanation that the change reflected post-revolt demographic shifts, noting that comparable reductions of particular ethnic groups in other provinces, such as Pannonia, produced no equivalent renaming. He concluded that the measure was directed specifically against the Jewish people.

=== Later Jewish life under Rome ===
In the revolt's aftermath, Jewish political expression adapted to the permanence of Roman rule. Galilee emerged as the new demographic and religious center of Jewish life, absorbing Jews displaced from Judea. Rabbinic literature records that as persecution eased, the sages gathered in Galilee at the Beit Rimon Valley, and Usha became the seat of the Sanhedrin, the Jewish high court. Jewish communities also persisted on the periphery of Judea, in places such as Lod, Eleutheropolis, Ein Gedi, and the southern Hebron Hills, as well as along the coastal plain, in Beit She'an, and across the Golan Heights.

In the following decades, the Romans seemingly recognized Rabbi Simeon ben Gamaliel II as a representative of the Jewish people. Later, his descendant Rabbi Judah ha-Nasi similarly served as Nasi, or patriarch, under the Severan dynasty, when Jewish–Roman relations reached their most favorable point; around 200, he redacted the Mishnah, the foundational collection of Jewish oral law. Nevertheless, the community's fortunes did not hold: deteriorating conditions brought on by the Crisis of the Third Century and subsequent anti-Jewish measures under Byzantine rule gradually eroded the standing of the Jewish community in Palaestina, which was increasingly eclipsed by the community in Sasanian-ruled Babylonia. In the 420s, the patriarchate was abolished by Emperor Theodosius II, ending centralized Jewish leadership in the Land of Israel.

== Legacy ==
=== Impact on Jewish thought ===
Following the revolt, rabbinic Judaism moved away from militant strands of messianic belief. Tannaitic sources such as the Mishnah and Tosefta emphasized observance of Jewish law as the primary path to religious fulfillment, giving priority to the sanctification of daily life over expectations of immediate salvation. Belief in a future messianic restoration remained part of rabbinic thought, but was no longer connected to revolutionary action. Rabbi Jose ben Kisma stated in the Babylonian Talmud (Avodah Zarah, 18a.6): "This nation [Rome] has been given reign by [a decree from] Heaven". Messianism was thus transformed into an eschatology of end-times redemption removed from immediate action, providing continuity and stability during a period of loss and exile. Apocalyptic strands were not entirely extinguished, however; they resurfaced among the amoraic sages (c. 200–500), especially in Babylonia.

The aspiration for Jewish sovereignty would remain unfulfilled for the following eighteen centuries, with political expression shifting from activism to cultural and religious continuity. Historian Doron Mendels suggested that after the revolt, Jewish nationalism in its activist form ceased, though a passive sentiment persisted in rabbinic circles. Historian David Goodblatt argued that nationalism did not cease; only its activist expressions were extinguished. Jewish national identity, he argued, persisted through culture, law, language and religion, with institutions like the Temple and kingship surviving in Jewish thought, messianic hopes, and collective memory.

=== Bar Kokhba in rabbinic literature ===
Rabbinic tradition, shaped by folk memory in the centuries following the revolt, portrays Simon bar Kokhba as a heroic figure of exceptional strength. One legend portrays him as single-handedly slaying Roman soldiers by hurling massive catapult stones. To test his fighters, he reportedly required them either to sever a finger or uproot a cedar tree while on horseback, a practice supposedly discontinued only at the request of the rabbis.

According to rabbinic tradition, the revolt's strength derived from rabbinic support rather than Bar Kokhba's physical power, and his defeat was seen as a consequence of arrogance understood through a framework of sin and punishment. One legend attributes the fall of Betar to a Samaritan who sowed discord between Bar Kokhba and his uncle, Rabbi Eleazar of Modi'im: suspecting Eleazar of collaborating with the enemy, Bar Kokhba killed him with a single kick, forfeiting divine protection. Another legend, in the Babylonian Talmud (Sanhedrin 93), holds that Bar Kokhba was executed by the sages after failing to meet the messianic criterion of judging "by scent" (Isaiah 11:3–4).

The defeat is portrayed in rabbinic literature as divinely ordained. A rabbinic legend, found in Midrash Tanhuma (Genesis, 7), describes Hadrian as declaring himself a god after conquering Jerusalem, destroying the Temple, and exiling the people of Israel. In another passage of the same work (Devarim, 7), when Hadrian boasts of his conquest, the response is: "If it had not been [ordained] from the heavens, you would not have conquered. [...] now because of our sins, you have prevailed against us." According to Lamentations Rabbah (2.2), when Bar Kokhba's body was shown to Hadrian, the emperor ordered the rest of the body brought forward. A snake was found coiled around his neck, leading Hadrian to declare: "If his God had not slain him, who could have overcome him?" The same work also associates the destruction of towns and villages during the revolt with transgressions of Jewish law. Sifrei Devarim 323 depicts a Roman cavalry officer pursuing a Jew in Judea who calls out that Jewish subjugation could only have occurred because God willed it.

The fast of Tisha B'Av, commemorating the destruction of the First and Second Temples, was expanded in the Mishnah (Ta'anit 4.5–6) to include the fall of Betar and the ploughing of Jerusalem. Another passage in the Mishnah (Sotah 9.14) presents the three Jewish revolts as a sequence of national disasters, each leading to additional mourning practices in the context of weddings; it states that "in the final war, they forbade brides to ride in a litter inside the city."

=== In Christian thought ===
The revolt reinforced the Christian interpretation that the Temple's destruction signified divine punishment, becoming a central argument in anti-Jewish polemic. For Justin Martyr, a 2nd century apologist, Jewish responsibility for the crucifixion had brought about the Temple's destruction in the First Revolt, while the Bar Kokhba Revolt rendered its consequences irreversible – definitive proof that God's covenant with the Jewish people had permanently ended. In the Dialogue with Trypho, he recast circumcision as a mark of divine punishment, arguing it had been instituted so that Jews would "suffer that which you now justly suffer", associating it with the desolation of their land, the burning of cities, the loss of produce to foreigners, and the prohibition against entering Jerusalem. In Ecclesiastical History (4.5.3–4), Eusebius interpreted the revolt's suppression as marking the end of Jewish Christianity: the unbroken line of Hebrew bishops of Jerusalem, all circumcised, gave way to gentile leadership, signifying for Eusebius Jerusalem's absorption into the universal Church.

=== In Zionism and modern Israel ===
In modern Israeli culture, the revolt was reinterpreted as a national symbol of Jewish heroism. The Jewish holiday of Lag BaOmer, traditionally associated with the end of a plague that killed Rabbi Akiva's disciples and with Rabbi Shimon Bar Yochai, was reinterpreted within secular Zionist tradition to commemorate Bar Kokhba's military achievements, introducing customs such as bonfire lighting and playing with bows and arrows. A popular legend portraying Bar Kokhba taming a lion in a Roman arena became a standard feature of Lag baOmer celebrations, featured in school programs and holiday festivities.

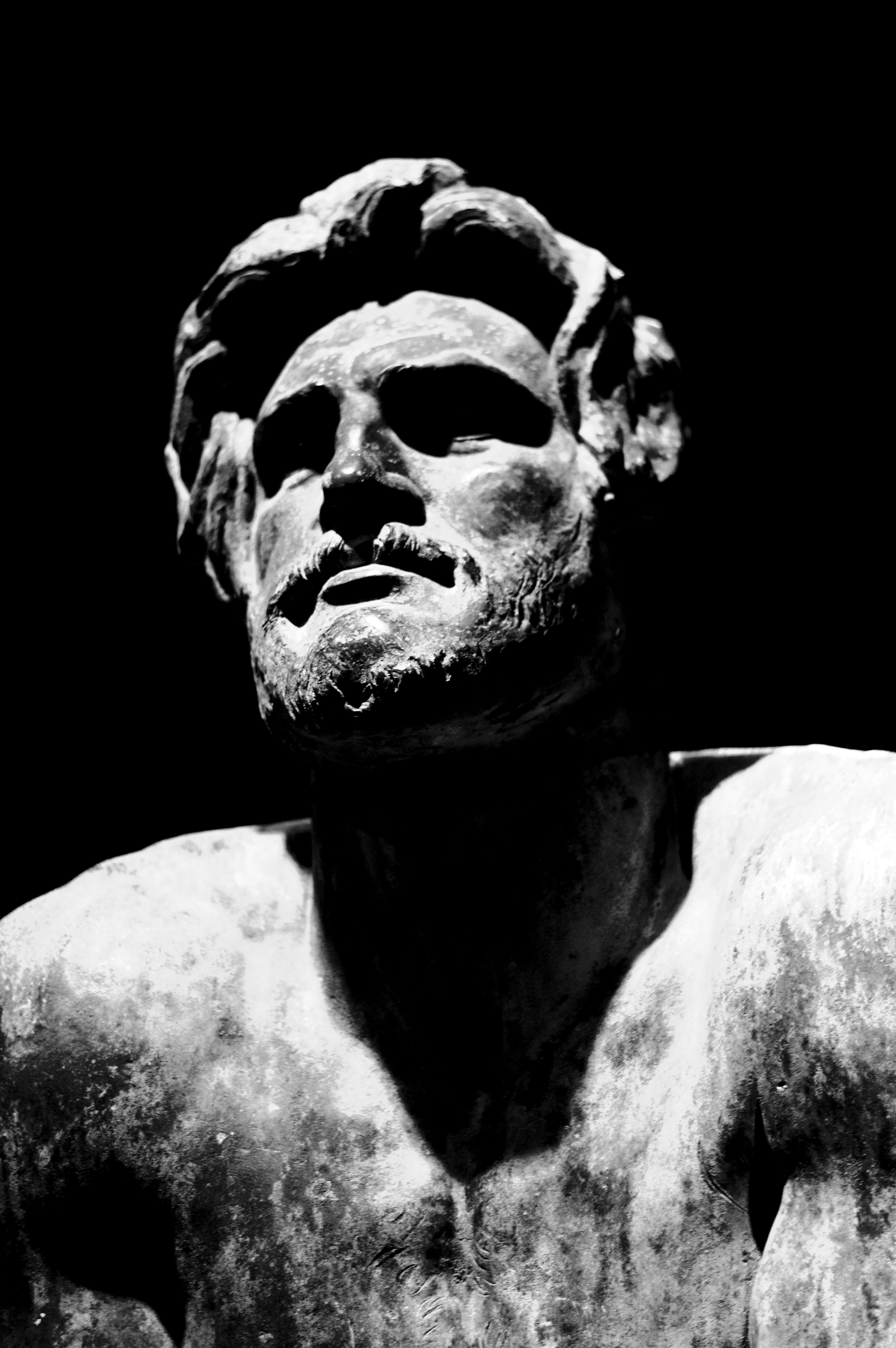
Bronze statue of Simon Bar Kokhba, sculpted by Enrico Glicenstein (1905). Eretz Israel Museum, Tel Aviv

In the early 1980s, a public debate over the revolt's legacy emerged in Israel, prompted by a critical reassessment by Yehoshafat Harkabi, a professor of international relations. Harkabi questioned both the strategic rationale of the revolt and the appropriateness of its modern commemoration, arguing that the rebels' excessive zeal and disregard for geopolitical realities produced a catastrophe exceeded in Jewish history only by The Holocaust. His critique provoked strong rebuttals from scholars such as Israel Eldad and David Rokeah, who maintained that the revolt should be remembered for its ideals and courage rather than judged solely by its outcome.

Since the late 20th century, Israeli educational materials have adopted a more critical approach to the revolt, encouraging students to examine differing Jewish views on the rebellion and integrate archaeological findings and historical analysis. Some programs also use the revolt's commemoration to draw broader lessons about mutual respect, the very value whose absence, according to rabbinic tradition, caused the death of Rabbi Akiva's disciples.

== See also ==
=== Jewish–Roman wars ===
- First Jewish–Roman War (66–73 CE)
- Diaspora Revolt (115–117 CE)
- Kitos War (115–117 CE)

=== Later Jewish and Samaritan revolts ===
- Jewish revolt against Constantius Gallus (352)
- Samaritan revolts (484–572)
- Jewish revolt against Heraclius (614–617/625)

=== Related topics ===
- History of the Jews in the Roman Empire
- List of Jewish civil wars
- Trajan's Dacian Wars

== Bibliography ==
=== Ancient sources ===
- Cassius Dio. Roman History, 69.12.1–14.3. Loeb Classical Library (in Greek and English). Translated by Earnest Cary. Cambridge, MA: Harvard University Press (1914–1927). Online at LacusCurtius here, and livius.org here. Book scan at Internet Archive here.
- Dindorf, Ludwig August, ed. (1832). Chronicon Paschale, I, p, 474. Bonn: Impensis Ed. Weberi.
- Historia Augusta. Historia Augusta, Hadrian, 14.2.
- Modestinus. Rules, 48.8.11.
- Justin Martyr. First Apology, 36.1.
- Justin Martyr. Dialogue with Trypho.
- Eusebius. Ecclesiastical History, 4.5–6.
- Eusebius. Chronicle of Hadrian, XVII.
- Eusebius. Demonstratio Evangelica, VIII, 4, 23.
- Jerome. Commentary on Isaiah, 2.15.
- Jerome (1958). Commentary on Daniel. Translated by Archer, Gleason L. Grand Rapids: Baker Book House.
- Jerome (2011). Commentary on Jeremiah, VI, 18.5–6. Translated by Graves, Michael. Downers Grove: InterVarsity Press.
- Jerome. Commentary on Obadiah, 20.21.
- Jerome. Commentary on Zechariah 3.11.
- Mishnah. Mishnah, Ta'anit 4:5–6; Sotah 9:14.
- Tosefta. Tosefta, Avodah Zarah 4:3; Sotah 15:10.
- Jerusalem Talmud. Jerusalem Talmud, Ta'anit IV, 5 & IV, 8; Kiddushin 4:65c; Yevamot 8:9d.
- Babylonian Talmud. Babylonian Talmud, Berakhot 61b; Sanhedrin 14a; Avodah Zarah 18a. Translated by Steinsaltz, Adin.
- Genesis Rabbah. Genesis Rabbah, 64:10.
- Lamentations Rabbah. Lamentations Rabbah, 1:45; 2:2; 2:4; 5:1.
- Midrash Tanhuma (Buber version). Midrash Tanhuma, Genesis 7; Devarim, Siman 7. Translated by Townsend, John T.
- Mekhilta de Rabbi Ishmael, Pischa 13. Translated by Silverstein, Shraga. Nebraska: University of Nebraska Press. 2004. pp. 324–325.
- Sifrei. Sifrei Devarim, 80:4; 322. Translated by Silverstein, Shraga.

=== Modern sources ===
- Aharoni, Yohanan (1962). "Expedition B — The Cave of Horror". Israel Exploration Journal. 12 (3–4). Israel Exploration Society: 186–199. JSTOR 27924906.
- Ameling, Walter; Cotton, Hannah M.; Eck, Werner; Ecker, Avner, eds. (25 June 2018). "LXXIII. Bethar (Bethther, Bettir, mod. Kh. el-Yahud) nos. 3197-3200". Iudaea / Idumaea, Part 1: 2649-3324. Corpus Inscriptionum Iudaeae/Palaestinae. De Gruyter. pp. 597–604. doi:10.1515/9783110544213-078. ISBN 978-3-11-054421-3.
- Applebaum, Shimon (1989). "Romanization and Indigenism in Judaea". Judaea in Hellenistic and Roman Times. Brill. pp. 155–165. ISBN 978-90-04-66664-1.
- Arubas, Benjamin; Heinzelmann, Michael; Mevorah, David; Overman, Andrew (2019). "Capricorno Alae VII Phrygum … (i) Interim report on the fort near Tel Shalem". Journal of Roman Archaeology. 32: 201–213. doi:10.1017/S1047759419000114.
- Bar, Doron (2005). "Rural Monasticism as a Key Element in the Christianization of Byzantine Palestine". The Harvard Theological Review. 98 (1): 49–65. doi:10.1017/S0017816005000854. ISSN 0017-8160. JSTOR 4125284. S2CID 162644246.
- Bar-Nathan, Rachel; Bijovsky, Gabriela I. (2018). "The Emperor Plowing: Cause or Effect? A Hadrianic Coin from Excavations at Shu'afat and the Foundation of Aelia Capitolina". Israel Numismatic Research. 13: 139–150.
- Bartrop, Paul R.; Totten, Samuel (2004). "The History of Genocide: An Overview". Teaching about Genocide: Issues, Approaches, and Resources. Information Age. pp. 23–55. ISBN 1-59311-075-8.
- Belayche, Nicole (2003). "Tyché et la Tyché dans les cités de la Palestine romaine". Syria (in French). 80: 111–138. doi:10.3406/syria.2003.7747.
- Ben Zeev, Miriam (2018). "New Insights into Roman Policy in Judea on the Eve of the Bar Kokhba Revolt". Journal for the Study of Judaism in the Persian, Hellenistic, and Roman Period. 49 (1). Brill: 84–107. doi:10.1163/15700631-12481193. JSTOR 26551240.
- Ben Zeev Hofman, Miriam (2023). Aelia Capitolina in Context: Roman Policy in Judaea in the Time of Hadrian. Interdisciplinary Studies in Ancient Culture and Religion. Peeters Publishers. doi:10.2307/jj.3919387. ISBN 978-90-429-4836-5. JSTOR jj.3919387.
- Berthelot, Katell (2021). Jews and Their Roman Rivals: Pagan Rome's Challenge to Israel. Princeton and Oxford: Princeton University Press. ISBN 978-0-691-19929-0.
- Birley, Eric (1961). Roman Britain and the Roman Army: Collected Papers (2nd ed.). Kendal: Titus Wilson & Son.
- Bowersock, Glen W. (2003). "The Tel Shalem Arch and P. Nahal Hever / Seiyal 8". In Schäfer, Peter (ed.). The Bar Kokhba War Reconsidered. Texts and Studies in Ancient Judaism. Mohr Siebeck. pp. 171–180. ISBN 978-3-161-58794-8.
- Cesarik, Nikola; Filipčić, Damir; Kramberger, Vlatka (2018). "Bar Kokhba's bronze coin from Kolovare Beach in Zadar". Journal of the Archaeological Museum in Zadar. 32 (32).
- Cohen, Shaye J. D. (2014). From Maccabees To Mishnah (3rd ed.). Louisville, Kentucky: Westminster John Knox Press. ISBN 978-0-664-23904-6.
- Cotton, Hannah (1995). "The archive of Salome Komaise daughter of Levi: another archive from the 'Cave of Letters'". Zeitschrift für Papyrologie und Epigraphik. 105: 171–208. JSTOR 20189273.
- Cotton, Hannah (2003). "The Bar Kokhba Revolt and the Documents from the Judaean Desert: Nabataean Participation in the Revolt (P. Yadin 52)". In Schäfer, Peter (ed.). The Bar Kokhba War Reconsidered. Texts and Studies in Ancient Judaism. Mohr Siebeck. pp. 133–152. doi:10.1628/978-3-16-158794-8. ISBN 978-3-161-58794-8.
- Cotton, Hannah (2007). "The impact of the Roman army in the province of Judaea/Syria Palaestina". The Impact of the Roman Army (200 BC–AD 476): Economic, Social, Political, Religious and Cultural Aspects. Brill. pp. 393–407. ISBN 978-90-04-16044-6.
- Clements, Ruth A. (2012). "Temple and Identity in Early Christianity and in the Johannine Community: Reflections on the "Parting of the Ways"". In Schwartz, Daniel R.; Weiss, Zeev (eds.). Epilogue: 70 CE After 135 CE—The Making of a Watershed?. Brill. pp. 517–536. ISBN 978-9-004-21534-4.
- Dąbrowa, Edward (2017). "Hadrianic Governors of Syria: A Reappraisal". Zeitschrift für Papyrologie und Epigraphik. 201: 285–291.
- Dąbrowa, Edward (2019). "Poblicius Marcellus and the Bar Kokhba Revolt". Rivista di Storia dell'Antichità. 49: 69–84. doi:10.2307/jj.32155388.7.
- deSilva, David A. (2024). Judea under Greek and Roman Rule. Oxford University Press. ISBN 978-0-190-26328-7.
- Doering, Lutz (2018). "Bar Kokhba Letters". In Brooke, George J.; Hempel, Charlotte (eds.). T&T Clark Companion to the Dead Sea Scrolls. Bloomsbury T&T Clark. pp. 289–294. doi:10.5040/9780567669858.ch-030. ISBN 978-0-567-66985-8.
- Eck, Werner (1999). "The Bar Kokhba Revolt: The Roman Point of View". The Journal of Roman Studies. 89. Society for the Promotion of Roman Studies: 76–89. doi:10.2307/300735. JSTOR 300735.
- Eck, Werner; Foerster, Gideon (1999). "Ein Triumphbogen für Hadrian im Tal von Beth Shean bei Tel Shalem". Journal of Roman Archaeology. 12: 294–313. doi:10.1017/S1047759400018043.
- Eck, Werner (2003). "Hadrian, the Bar Kokhba Revolt, and the Epigraphic Transmission". In Schäfer, Peter (ed.). The Bar Kokhba War Reconsidered. Texts and Studies in Ancient Judaism. Mohr Siebeck. pp. 153–170. doi:10.1628/978-3-16-158794-8. ISBN 978-3-161-58794-8.
- Eshel, Hanan; Zissu, Boaz (2019). "The Refuge Caves". The Bar Kokhba Revolt: The Archaeological Evidence. Jerusalem: Yad Izhak Ben-Zvi. pp. 62–64. ISBN 978-965-217-429-1.
- Eshel, Esther; Eshel, Hanan; Yardeni, Ada (2011). "A Document from "Year 4 of the Destruction of the House of Israel"". Dead Sea Discoveries. 18 (1): 1–28. doi:10.1163/156851710X503530. ISSN 0929-0761.
- Eshel, Hanan (2006). "The Bar Kochba Revolt, 132–135". In Katz, Steven T. (ed.). The Late Roman-Rabbinic Period. The Cambridge History of Judaism. Vol. 4th. Cambridge University Press. pp. 105–127. ISBN 978-0-521-77248-8.
- Feldman, Louis H. (1990). "Some Observations on the Name of Palestine". Hebrew Union College Annual. 61. Hebrew Union College – Jewish Institute of Religion: 1–23. JSTOR 23508170.
- Gafni, Isaiah M. (1997). Land, Center & Diaspora: Jewish Constructs in Late Antiquity. Journal for the Study of the Pseudepigrapha, Supplement Series 21. Sheffield, UK: Sheffield Academic Press. ISBN 1-85075-644-9.
- Gichon, Mordechai (1986). "New insight into the Bar Kokhba War and a reappraisal of Dio Cassius 69.12–13". The Jewish Quarterly Review. 77 (1). University of Pennsylvania Press: 15–43. doi:10.2307/1454444. JSTOR 1454444.
- Gibson, E. Leigh (1999). The Jewish Manumission Inscriptions of the Bosporus Kingdom. Texts and Studies in Ancient Judaism (TSAJ). Vol. 75. doi:10.1628/978-3-16-158732-0. ISBN 978-3-16-158732-0.
- Goodblatt, David M. (2006). Elements of Ancient Jewish Nationalism. Cambridge: Cambridge University Press. ISBN 978-0-521-86202-8.
- Goodblatt, David (2006a). "The political and social history of the Jewish community in the Land of Israel". In Davies, William David; Finkelstein, Louis; Katz, Steven T. (eds.). The Late Roman-Rabbinic Period. The Cambridge History of Judaism. Vol. 4. Cambridge University Press. pp. 404–430. ISBN 978-0-521-77248-8.
- Goodman, Martin (2004). "Trajan and the Origins of Roman Hostility to the Jews". Past & Present (182): 3–29. doi:10.1093/past/182.1.3. JSTOR 3600803.
- Grabbe, Lester L. (2010). An Introduction to Second Temple Judaism: History And Religion Of The Jews In The Time Of Nehemiah, The Maccabees, Hillel, And Jesus. T&T Clark International. ISBN 978-0567552488.
- Grabbe, Lester L. (2021). A History of the Jews and Judaism in the Second Temple Period, Volume 4: The Jews under the Roman Shadow (4 BCE–150 CE). The Library of Second Temple Studies. T&T Clark. ISBN 978-0567700704.
- Hachlili, Rachel (1988). "The Bar Kokhba Period (132-135 BCE)". Ancient Jewish Art and Archaeology in the Land of Israel. Brill. pp. 128–132. doi:10.1163/9789004495630_015. ISBN 978-9-004-49563-0.
- Sivan, Hagith (2008). Palestine in Late Antiquity. Oxford University Press. ISBN 978-019928417-7. Archived from the original on 11 November 2024.
- Harris, William V. (1980). "Towards a Study of the Roman Slave Trade". Memoirs of the American Academy in Rome. 36: 122. doi:10.2307/4238700. ISSN 0065-6801. JSTOR 4238700.
- Herr, Moshe David (1984). "פני התקופה: ארץ-ישראל באימפריה הרומית אחרי חורבן בית שני". In Stern, Menahem (ed.). The Roman Byzantine Period: The Roman Period from the Conquest to the Ben Kozba War (63 BCE – 135 CE). The History of Eretz Israel (in Hebrew). Vol. 4. Ben-Zvi Institute. pp. 283–370.
- Herr, Moshe David (1985). "פני התקופה: ארץ-ישראל מלאחר מלחמת בן כוסבה ועד לחלוקת האימפריה הרומית". In Herr, Moshe David (ed.). The Roman Byzantine Period: Mishnah and Talmud Period and the Byzantine Rule (70–640). The History of Eretz Israel (in Hebrew). Vol. 5. Ben-Zvi Institute. pp. 11–104.
- Herr, Moshe David (2022). "היהודים בארץ-ישראל בימי האימפריה הרומית הנוצרית" [The Jews in the Land of Israel in the Days of the Christian Roman Empire]. ארץ-ישראל בשלהי העת העתיקה: מבואות ומחקרים [Eretz Israel in Late Antiquity: Introductions and Studies] (in Hebrew). Vol. 1. ירושלים: יד יצחק בן-צבי. pp. 218–219. ISBN 978-965-217-444-4.
- Horbury, William (2014). Jewish War under Trajan and Hadrian. Cambridge University Press. ISBN 978-1-139-04905-4.
- Isaac, Benjamin; Oppenheimer, Aharon (1985). "The revolt of Bar Kokhba: ideology and modern scholarship". Journal of Jewish Studies. 36 (1): 33–60. doi:10.18647/1180/JJS-1985.
- Isaac, Benjamin; Oppenheimer, Aharon (1998). "The Revolt of Bar Kokhba: Ideology and Modern Scholarship". In Isaac, Benjamin H. (ed.). The Near East Under Roman Rule: Selected Papers. Brill. pp. 220–252, 226–227. ISBN 90-04-10736-3.
- Isaac, Benjamin (2017). "Roman Religious Policy and the Bar Kokhba War". Empire and Ideology in the Graeco-Roman World: Selected Papers. Cambridge: Cambridge University Press. pp. 306–323. doi:10.1017/9781316476963.016. ISBN 978-1-316-47696-3.
- Jacobson, David (1990). "The Plan of Herod's Temple". Bulletin of the Anglo-Israel Archaeological Society. 10: 36–66. doi:10.1179/026628390793616238 (inactive 20 May 2026).
- Jacobson, David (1999). "Palestine and Israel". Bulletin of the American Schools of Oriental Research. 313 (313): 65–74. doi:10.2307/1357617. JSTOR 1357617. S2CID 163303829.
- Jacobson, David (2022). "Insights on the Bar Kokhba Revolt from the Coins". Electrum. 29: 171–196. doi:10.4467/20800909EL.22.012.15782.
- Ji, C. C.; Lee, J. K. (2002). "The survey in the regions of 'Iraq al-Amir and Wadi al-Kafrayn, 2000". Annual of the Department of Antiquities of Jordan. 46: 179–195.
- Klein, Eitan (2011). Tavger, Aharon; Amar, Zohar; Billig, Miriam (eds.). "Gophna during the Late Roman Period in Light of Artistic and Epigraphic Finds" [גופנא בתקופה הרומית המאוחרת לאור הממצא האמנותי והאפיגרפי]. In the Highland's Depth: Ephraim Range and Binyamin Research Studies (in Hebrew): 119–134.
- Klein, Eitan; Gayer, Asaf; Ganor, Amir; Hamer, Hagay (2023). "Preliminary Insights following the Recovery of a Cache of Roman-Period Weaponry from the Cave of the Swords". New Studies in the Archaeology of the Judean Desert: Collected Papers: 453–479. doi:10.2307/jj.10329820.22. ISBN 978-965-406-774-4. JSTOR jj.10329820.22.
- Klein, Eitan (2024). יהודה משממה תקום: מבט ארכאולוגי על ארץ יהודה בתקופה הרומית המאוחרת [From Barren Land Judea Shall Rise: An Archaeological Perspective of the Land of Judea during the Late Roman Period] (in Hebrew). Ariel University Press. ISBN 978-965-7632-45-1.
- Krauss, Samuel (1906). "Bar Kokba and Bar Kokba War". In Singer, Isidore (ed.). The Jewish Encyclopedia. Vol. 2. pp. 506–507.
- Leaney, Alfred Robert Clare (1984). The Jewish and Christian World 200 BC to AD 200. Cambridge: Cambridge University Press. doi:10.1017/CBO9780511621369. ISBN 978-0-511-62136-9.
- Levine, David (2017). "70 CE or 135 CE – Where was the Watershed? Ancient and Modern Perspectives". In Schwartz, Joshua J.; Tomson, Peter J. (eds.). Jews and Christians in the First and Second Centuries: The Interbellum 70‒132 CE. Compendia Rerum Iudaicarum ad Novum Testamentum. Vol. 15. Brill. pp. 161–175. doi:10.1163/9789004352971_011. ISBN 978-90-04-35297-1.
- Leibner, Uzi (2010). "Excavations at Khirbet Wadi Hamam (Lower Galilee): the synagogue and the settlement". Journal of Roman Archaeology. 23: 220–237. doi:10.1017/S1047759400002373. ISSN 1047-7594.
- Leibner, Uzi (2020). "The Dating of the "Galilean"-Type Synagogues: Khirbet Wadi Hamam as a Case-Study". In Doering, Lutz; Krause, Andrew R. (eds.). Synagogues in the Hellenistic and Roman Periods: Archaeological Finds, New Methods, New Theories. Vandenhoeck & Ruprecht.
- Lewin, Ariel (2005). The Archaeology of Ancient Judea and Palestine. Getty Publications. p. 33. ISBN 0-89236-800-4.
- Lieu, Judith (2025). Explorations in the Second Christian Century: Texts, Groups, Ideas, Voices. Ancient Judaism and Early Christianity. Vol. 120. Brill. ISBN 978-900-471567-7.
- Linder, Amnon (2006). "The legal status of the Jews in the Roman Empire". In Katz, Steven T. (ed.). The Late Roman-Rabbinic Period. The Cambridge History of Judaism. Vol. 4th. Cambridge University Press. pp. 128–173. ISBN 978-0-521-77248-8.
- Magen, Yitzhak; Zionit, Yoav; Sirkis, Erna (1999). "Kiryat Sefer - A Jewish Village and Synagogue of the Second Temple Period / קרית-ספר - עיירה יהודית ובית-כנסת מימי הבית השני". Qadmoniot: A Journal for the Antiquities of Eretz-Israel and Bible Lands / קדמוניות: כתב-עת לעתיקות ארץ-ישראל וארצות המקרא (in Hebrew). לב (1 (117)): 25–32. ISSN 0033-4839. JSTOR 23681828 – via JSTOR.
- Magness, Jodi (2012). The Archaeology of the Holy Land: From the Destruction of Solomon's Temple to the Muslim Conquest. Cambridge University Press. ISBN 978-1-139-01383-3.
- Magness, Jodi (2024). Jerusalem Through The Ages: From Its Beginnings To The Crusades. New York, NY: Oxford University Press. ISBN 978-0-19-093780-5.
- Mendels, Doron (1992). The Rise and Fall of Jewish Nationalism: Jewish and Christian Ethnicity in Ancient Palestine. Anchor Bible Reference Library. New York: Doubleday. ISBN 978-0-385-26126-5.
- Marom, Roy (2026). "Continued Pasts: Samaritan Tolidah Extensions and Self-Reflections on History". In Alsancakli, Sacha; Bockholt, Philip (eds.). Texts as Living Objects: Dhayls and Knowledge Transmission in the Islamic World. Handbook of Oriental Studies. Section 1 The Near and Middle East. Vol. 204. Brill. pp. 223–249. doi:10.1163/9789004763814-011. ISBN 978-90-04-76381-4.
- Meyers, Eric M.; Chancey, Mark A. (2012). Alexander to Constantine: Archaeology of the Land of the Bible, Volume III. The Anchor Yale Bible Reference Library. Yale University Press. ISBN 978-0-300-14179-5. JSTOR j.ctt32brvs.
- Millar, Fergus (1995). The Roman Near East: 31 BC–AD 337. Harvard University Press. ISBN 978-0-674-77886-3.
- Mitchel, L. A. (1992). Hesban 07: Hellenistic & Roman Strata: A Study of the Stratigraphy of Tell Hesban from the 2nd Cent. BC to the 4th Cent. AD. Andrews University Press.
- Mitchell, Margaret (2006). "From Jerusalem to the ends of the earth". In Mitchell, Margaret M.; Young, Frances M. (eds.). Origins to Constantine. The Cambridge History of Christianity. Vol. 1. Cambridge University Press. pp. 293–301. ISBN 9781139054836.
- Mor, Menachem (1986). "Two Legions: The Same Fate? (The Disappearance of the Legions IX Hispana and XXII Deiotariana)". Zeitschrift für Papyrologie und Epigraphik. 62: 267–278. JSTOR 20186341.
- Mor, Menahem (2013). "What Does Tel Shalem Have to Do with the Bar Kokhba Revolt?". Scripta Judaica Cracoviensia. 11: 79–96. doi:10.4467/20843925SJ.13.009.1305.
- Mor, Menahem (2016). The Second Jewish Revolt: The Bar Kokhba War, 132–136 CE. Brill. ISBN 978-90-04-31463-4.
- Morçöl, Göktuğ (2006). Handbook of Decision Making. CRC Press. ISBN 978-1-57444-548-0.
- Olshanetsky, Haggai (2025). "The Identity of the Leaders of the Second Jewish Revolt and Bar Koseba's True Role in the Insurrection". Palestine Exploration Quarterly. 157 (4): 275–295. doi:10.1080/00310328.2024.2435788. ISSN 0031-0328.
- Oppenheimer, Aharon (2023). "The Ban on Circumcision as a Cause of the Revolt: A Reconsideration". In Friedman, David A.; Czajkowski, Kimberley (eds.). Looking In, Looking Out: Jews and Non-Jews in Mutual Contemplation. Supplements to the Journal for the Study of Judaism. Vol. 212. Brill. pp. 38–57. doi:10.1163/9789004685055_004. ISBN 9789004685055.
- Oppenheimer, Aharon (2005). Oppenheimer, Nili (ed.). Between Rome and Babylon: Studies in Jewish Leadership and Society. Texts and Studies in Ancient Judaism. Vol. 108. Mohr Siebeck.
- Paget, James Carleton (2018). "Jewish Revolts and Jewish-Christian Relations". In Schwartz, Joshua J.; Tomson, Peter J. (eds.). Jews and Christians in the First and Second Centuries: The Interbellum 70‒132 CE. Compendia Rerum Iudaicarum ad Novum Testamentum. Vol. 15. Brill. pp. 276–306. doi:10.1163/9789004352971_011. ISBN 978-90-04-35297-1.
- Porat, Roi; Kalman, Yakov; Chachy, Rachel (2016). "Excavation of the approach to the mountain palace-fortress at Herodium". Journal of Roman Archaeology. 29: 142–164. doi:10.1017/S1047759400072081.
- Powell, Lindsay (2017). The Bar Kokhba War AD 132–136: The last Jewish revolt against Imperial Rome. Campaign. Osprey Publishing. ISBN 978-1472817983.
- Raviv, Dvir; Ben David, Chaim (2021). "Cassius Dio's figures for the demographic consequences of the Bar Kokhba War: Exaggeration or reliable account?". Journal of Roman Archaeology. 34 (2): 585–607. doi:10.1017/S1047759421000271. ISSN 1047-7594.
- Raviv, Dvir; Zissu, Boaz (2022). "Judean hiding complexes: a geographical, typological and functional update (Israel)". Opera Ipogea. 2: 39–54. doi:10.57588/SSIOI22022/39-54.
- Raviv, Dvir; Zissu, Boaz (2024). "An Update on the Geographical Distribution of the Coins Minted by the Bar Kokhba". Israel Numismatic Research. 19: 71–88.
- Rogers, Guy MacLean (2022). For the Freedom of Zion: The Great Revolt of Jews against Romans, 66–74 CE. Yale University Press. ISBN 978-0-300-24813-5. Archived from the original on 7 December 2024.
- Rottenberg, Dan (1986). Finding Our Fathers: A Guidebook to Jewish Genealogy (Reprint ed.). Genealogical Publishing Co. ISBN 0806311517.
- Safrai, Shmuel (1976). "The Era of the Mishnah and Talmud (70–640)". In Ben-Sasson, H.H. (ed.). A History of the Jewish People. Harvard University Press. pp. 307–382. ISBN 0-674-39730-4.
- Schäfer, Peter (1981). Der Bar Kokhba-Aufstand (in German). Tübingen: Mohr Siebeck.
- Schäfer, Peter (2003b). The History of the Jews in the Greco-Roman World: The Jews of Palestine from Alexander the Great to the Arab Conquest. London and New York: Routledge. ISBN 0-203-32198-7.
- Schiffman, Lawrence H. (1991). "Revolt and Restoration". From Text to Tradition: A History of Second Temple and Rabbinic Judaism. Ktav Publishing House. ISBN 978-0-881-25372-6.
- Schiffman, Lawrence H. (2006). "Messianism and apocalypticism in rabbinic texts". In Katz, Steven T. (ed.). The Late Roman-Rabbinic Period. The Cambridge History of Judaism. Vol. 4th. Cambridge University Press. pp. 1053–1072. ISBN 978-0-521-77248-8.
- Schwartz, Seth (2016). "The Impact of the Jewish Rebellions, 66–135 CE: Destruction or Provincialization?". In Collins, John J.; Manning, J.G. (eds.). Revolt and Resistance in the Ancient Classical World and the Near East. Culture and History of the Ancient Near East. Vol. 85. Brill. pp. 234–252. doi:10.1163/9789004330184_016. ISBN 978-90-04-33018-4.
- Seligman, Jon (2019). "Were There Villages in Jerusalem's Hinterland During the Byzantine Period?". In Peleg-Barkat, Orit; Ashkenazi, Jacob; Leibner, Uzi; Aviam, Mordechai; Talgam, Rina (eds.). Between Sea and Desert: On Kings, Nomads, Cities and Monks. Essays in Honor of Joseph Patrich. Jerusalem: Ostracon. pp. 167–179. ISBN 978-965-92534-2-5.
- Shivtiel, Yinon (2022). "Hiding Complexes in Galilee: Aspects and Significance". Cities, Monuments and Objects in the Roman and Byzantine Levant: Studies in Honour of Gabi Mazor. Archaeopress. pp. 274–286. doi:10.2307/jj.14638136.26. JSTOR jj.14638136.26.
- Sion, Ofer; Ganor, Amir; Klein, Eitan; Amichay, Oriya; Hamer, Hagay; Cohen, Chaim (2023). "The Renewed Excavations in the Cave of Horror". In Sion, Ofer; Uziel, Joe; Ganor, Amir; Klein, Eitan (eds.). New Studies in the Archaeology of the Judean Desert: Collected Papers. Jerusalem: Israel Antiquities Authority. pp. 89–106. doi:10.2307/jj.10329820.7.
- Smallwood, E. Mary (1976). The Jews under Roman Rule from Pompey to Diocletian. Brill. doi:10.1163/9789004502048_023. ISBN 978-90-04-50204-8.
- Stiebel, Guy (2003). "The militaria from Herodium". In Bottini, G. C.; Di Segni, Leah; Chrupcała, L. D. (eds.). One Land–Many Cultures: Archaeological Studies in Honour of Stanislao Loffreda O.F.M. (PDF). Collectio maior (Studium Biblicum Franciscanum). Vol. 41. Franciscan Printing Press. pp. 215–244.
- Stern, Menahem (1980). Greek and Latin authors on Jews and Judaism. Vol. 2. Israel Academy of Sciences and Humanities. ISBN 978-96-52-08037-0.
- Taylor, J. E. (2012). The Essenes, the Scrolls, and the Dead Sea. Oxford University Press. ISBN 978-0-199-55448-5.
- Times of Israel (11 May 2020). "'Year 2 of freedom': Ancient coin from Bar Kochba revolt found near Temple Mount". The Times of Israel.
- Tsafrir, Yoram (2003). "Numismatics and the Foundation of Aelia Capitolina: A Critical Review". In Schäfer, Peter (ed.). The Bar Kokhba War Reconsidered. Texts and Studies in Ancient Judaism. Mohr Siebeck. pp. 31–36. ISBN 978-3-161-58794-8.
- Ussishkin, David (1993). "Archaeological Soundings at Betar, Bar-Kochba's Last Stronghold". Tel Aviv. 20 (1): 66–97. doi:10.1179/tav.1993.1993.1.66. ISSN 0334-4355.
- Yassif, Eli (2006). "Jewish Folk Literature in Late Antiquity". In Katz, Steven T. (ed.). The Late Roman-Rabbinic Period. The Cambridge History of Judaism. Vol. 4th. Cambridge University Press. pp. 721–748. ISBN 978-0-521-77248-8.
- Zerubavel, Yael (2003). "Bar Kokhba's Image in Modern Israeli Culture". In Schäfer, Peter (ed.). The Bar Kokhba War Reconsidered. Texts and Studies in Ancient Judaism. Mohr Siebeck. pp. 279–297. doi:10.1628/978-3-16-158794-8. ISBN 978-3-161-58794-8.
- Zissu, Boaz; Ganor, Amir (2002). "Ḥorvat 'Etri — the Ruins of a Second Temple Period Jewish Village on the Coastal Plain". Qadmoniot: A Journal for the Antiquities of Eretz-Israel and Bible Lands (in Hebrew). 1 (123): 18–27. ISSN 0033-4839. JSTOR 23682420.
- Zissu, Boaz; Gass, Erasmus (2012). "The Identification of Biblical Achzib at Khirbet ʿĒn el-Kizbe in the Judean Shephelah, and the Origins of Shimon Bar Kokhba". In Maeir, Aren M.; Magness, Jodi; Schiffman, Lawrence (eds.). 'Go Out and Study the Land' (Judges 18:2): Archaeological, Historical and Textual Studies in Honor of Hanan Eshel. Supplements to the Journal for the Study of Judaism. Vol. 148. Brill. pp. 377–426. ISBN 978-90-04-21413-2.
- Zissu, Boaz; Klein, Eitan (2011). "A Rock-Cut Burial Cave from the Roman Period at Beit Nattif, Judaean Foothills". Israel Exploration Journal. 61 (2): 196–216. JSTOR 23214247.
- Zissu, Boaz (2018). "Interbellum Judea 70–132 CE: An Archaeological Perspective". In Schwartz, Joshua J.; Tomson, Peter J. (eds.). Jews and Christians in the First and Second Centuries: The Interbellum 70‒132 CE. Compendia Rerum Iudaicarum ad Novum Testamentum. Vol. 15. Brill. pp. 19–49. doi:10.1163/9789004352971_011. ISBN 978-90-04-35297-1.
- Zissu, Boaz (2023). Sion, Ofer; Uziel, Joe; Ganor, Amir; Klein, Eitan (eds.). "Kings, Hermits and Refugees in the Judean Desert in the Late Second Temple Period and During the Bar Kokhba Revolt". New Studies in the Archaeology of the Judean Desert: Collected Papers. Israel Antiquities Authority: 185–216. doi:10.2307/jj.10329820.11. ISBN 978-965-406-774-4. JSTOR jj.10329820.11.
