= Yeshua ben Galgula =

One of the leaders of the Bar Kokhba revolt

Yeshua ben Galgula (Hebrew: ישוע בן גלגולא) was one of the leaders of the Bar Kokhba revolt, and the commander of Herodium during the revolt.

All that is known about Yeshua comes from documents uncovered in the Judaean Desert. In one of the letters, Yeshua was called the "Resurrection of the camp," which attests to his important role. He was asked in letters written directly by Bar Kokhba to make various administrative requests, such as sending wheat to the fighters, preparing them for lodging, and strengthening the fortifications in his place of residence. All the letters are in the Israel Museum in Jerusalem.
