= Jose ben Kisma =

Jewish Tanna sage of the 3rd generation

Jose ben Kisma or Yose ben Kisma (Hebrew: יוסי בן קיסמא) was a Jewish Tanna sage of the third Generation.

== Biography ==
He held moderate views, and had objected the rebellion against the Roman Authority. In that conjunction, the Midrash depicts a debate between him and Rabbi Haninah ben Teradion, one of the Ten Martyrs, over studying Torah in violation of the Roman prohibition. The Midrash describes that when Jose ben Kisma died, the greatest of Rome came to bury him, and when they returned from his tomb, they found Haninah ben Teradion teaching Torah in public, and had executed him by conflagration.

The following story by Yossi ben Kisma is recorded:

Once I was walking by the way, and there met me a man, and He greeted me; and I returned his greetings. He said to me, Rabbi, from what city art thou? I said to him, From a great city of sages and scholars, am I. He said to me, Rabbi, should it be thy wish to dwell with us in our place, and I will give thee thousand of thousands of dinars and gold, and goodly stones, and pearls. I said to him, If thou should give me all the silver, and gold, and goodly stones, and pearls in the world, I would not dwell but in a place of Torah; and thus it is written in the book of Psalms, by the hands of David, king of Israel:'The law of thy mouth is better to me than thousands of gold and silver (Psalms 118:72)'."

Jose (Joseph) ben Kisma is said to have been buried in Meron, at a place "between the vineyards."
