= Barsky (rural locality) =

Barsky (Russian: Барский; masculine), Barskaya (Барская; feminine), or Barskoye (Барское; neuter) is the name of several rural localities in Russia.

== Modern localities ==
=== Ivanovo Oblast ===
As of 2012, one rural locality in Ivanovo Oblast bears this name:

- Barskoye, Ivanovo Oblast, a village in Palekhsky District

=== Kostroma Oblast ===
As of 2012, two rural localities in Kostroma Oblast bear this name:

- Barskoye, Galichsky District, Kostroma Oblast, a village in Orekhovskoye Settlement of Galichsky District; 58°17′N 41°53′E
- Barskoye, Kostromskoy District, Kostroma Oblast, a village in Sushchevskoye Settlement of Kostromskoy District; 57°58′N 41°2′E

=== Moscow Oblast ===
As of 2012, one rural locality in Moscow Oblast bears this name:

- Barskoye, Moscow Oblast, a village in Davydovskoye Rural Settlement of Orekhovo-Zuyevsky District

=== Ryazan Oblast ===
As of 2012, one rural locality in Ryazan Oblast bears this name:

- Barskoye, Ryazan Oblast, a village in Ushmorsky Rural Okrug of Klepikovsky District

=== Vologda Oblast ===
As of 2012, three rural localities in Vologda Oblast bear this name:

- Barskoye, Gryazovetsky District, Vologda Oblast, a village in Pokrovsky Selsoviet of Gryazovetsky District
- Barskoye, Sokolsky District, Vologda Oblast, a village in Prigorodny Selsoviet of Sokolsky District
- Barskoye, Vologodsky District, Vologda Oblast, a village in Kipelovsky Selsoviet of Vologodsky District

=== Yaroslavl Oblast ===
As of 2012, two rural localities in Yaroslavl Oblast bear this name:

- Barskoye, Lyubimsky District, Yaroslavl Oblast, a village in Voskresensky Rural Okrug of Lyubimsky District
- Barskoye, Yaroslavsky District, Yaroslavl Oblast, a village in Melenkovsky Rural Okrug of Yaroslavsky District

== Abolished localities ==
- Barskoye, Parfenyevsky District, Kostroma Oblast, a village in Parfenyevsky Selsoviet of Parfenyevsky District in Kostroma Oblast; abolished on October 18, 2004

== Alternative names ==
- Barsky, alternative name of Krasnoarmeysky, a settlement in Kusaksky Selsoviet of Nemetsky National District in Altai Krai; 53°15′N 79°13′E
