= Ein Gedi =

Ein Gedi (Hebrew: עין גדי) may refer to the following:

== Place ==
- Ein Gedi – an ancient settlement and archaeological site, located in the Judaean Desert, along the western shore of the Dead Sea, in southern Israel
  - Chalcolithic temple of Ein Gedi
  - Ein Gedi synagogue
- Ein Gedi Nature Reserve – a nature reserve which protects the oasis with the ancient site
- Ein Gedi kibbutz – a kibbutz near the oasis
- Ein Gedi Spa – a resort and spa located near the Dead Sea

== Other ==
- Ein Gedi Mineral Water – a brand of bottled water from the region
- Ein Gedi race – an annual race event held in the Ein Gedi area, billed as the "lowest race on Earth"
- En Gedi Scroll – oldest Torah scroll found in a Torah ark
