= Barsky =

Barsky (masculine), Barskaya (feminine), or Barskoye (neuter) may refer to:

- Barsky (surname) (Barskaya), a surname
- Barsky (rural locality) (Barskaya, Barskoye), several rural localities in Russia
- Barsky Forest, a forest in the Republic of Bashkortostan, Russia
