= Humibaba (leopard) =

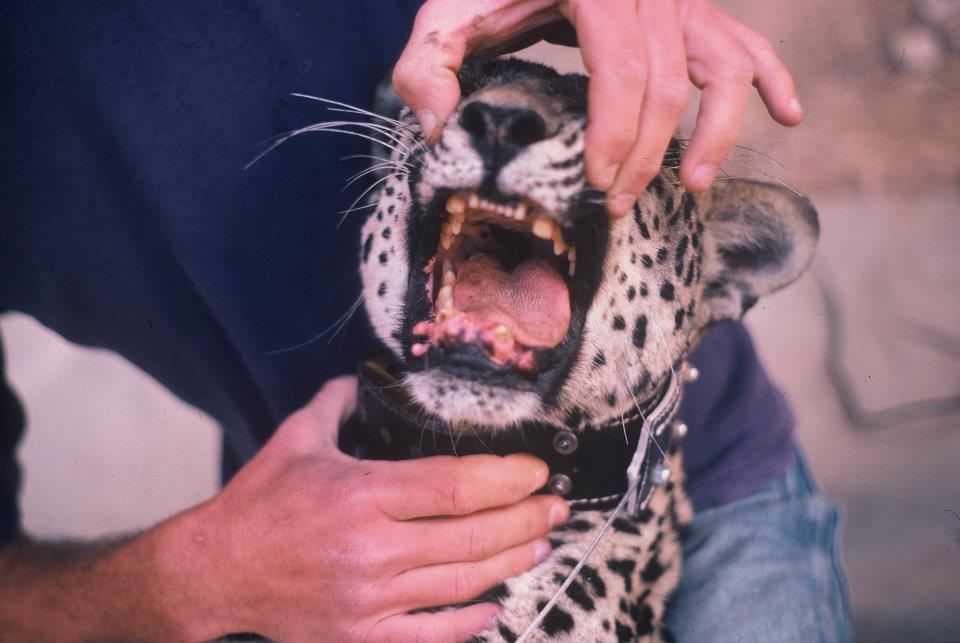
Humibaba, having her teeth checked

Humibaba (Hebrew: חומיבבה, c. 1974 – 16 September 1993) was a female adult Arabian leopard who lived in the Nahal David area of the Ein Gedi Nature Reserve in the Judean Desert in Israel. She became known as the oldest leopard in the Judean Desert, and numerous articles in the Israeli media followed her story over the years. Among other things, a regular column about her and other leopards in the Judean Desert was published in the youth newspaper "Sal'it".

Humibaba's publicity primarily came as a result of extensive research by zoologist Giora Ilani, who also gave her the name, after Humbaba, the forest guardian in the "Epic of Gilgamesh", who followed the leopard population in the Judean Desert over the years, particularly focusing on Humibaba.

During the 1980s, a decision was made to reduce the leopard population in the Judean Desert, as they posed a nuisance to the residents of Kibbutz Ein Gedi near the reserve, and a number of fertile leopards were captured and relocated outside the reserve. In the reserve, only Humibaba and Shelomzion remained. A rivalry developed between them, as the younger Shelomzion began to push the aging Humibaba out of the territory she claimed for herself.

In late 1985, Humibaba managed to remove the transmitter attached to her, which researchers used to track her. In early 1986, Humibaba was injured in an accident when a jeep carrying soldiers hit her. In the absence of a transmitter that would allow her to be located, there was briefly a fear that Humibaba had been killed in the accident, but she reappeared after some time.

In September 1993, Humibaba, estimated to be around 18-20 years old at the time, an age considered very old for a leopard in the wild, was killed by a group of soldiers who were hiking in the Nahal David area and felt threatened when they encountered her. Her death received extensive coverage in the Israeli media and raised controversy among nature conservationists.
