= Barsky (surname) =

Barsky, feminine: Barskaya is a mostly Jewish Russian-language surname, also used by the Ashkenazi Jews. It is derived from the name of the town of Bar, now in Vinnytsia Oblast, Ukraine. The suffix -sky imparts the meaning "of Bar" or "from Bar". Polish version is Barski/Barska, Ukrainian: Barskyi/Barska. Notable people include:

- Amie Barsky (born c. 1984), American reality television show contestant
- Brian A. Barsky, American Professor of Computer Science and Vision Science
- Bud Barsky (1891–1967), Ukrainian-born American film producer
- Edward K. Barsky (1885–1975), American surgeon and political activist
- Evangelyn Barsky (1894–1936), American lawyer
- Ivan Hryhorovych-Barskyi (1713–1785), Ukrainian architect
- Jack Barsky, alias of Albrecht Dittrich, former KGB spy turned IT specialist.
- Joseph Barsky (d. 1943), Russian Jewish architect
- Margarita Barskaya, Soviet actress, filmmaker, and screenwriter
- Max Barsky (born 1991), American professional wrestler best known by his ring name David Starr
- Moshe Barsky (1895–1913), Zionist settler in Ottoman Palestine, murdered in a hate crime that made him a martyr in the Zionist movement
- Paul Barsky, American talk radio personality
- Rick Barsky, Canadian Green Party politician
- Robert Barsky, American university professor
- Sam Barsky (born 1974), American knitting artist
- Tim Barsky, American musician
- Vasil Grigorovich-Barsky, Ukrainian monk and writer
- Vilen Barskyi, Ukrainian Soviet and German painter and graphic artist.
- Vladimir Barsky, Russian actor and filmmaker
