= Ein Gedi Spa =

Wellness center in Israel

Coordinates: 31°25′2.42″N 35°22′45.41″E

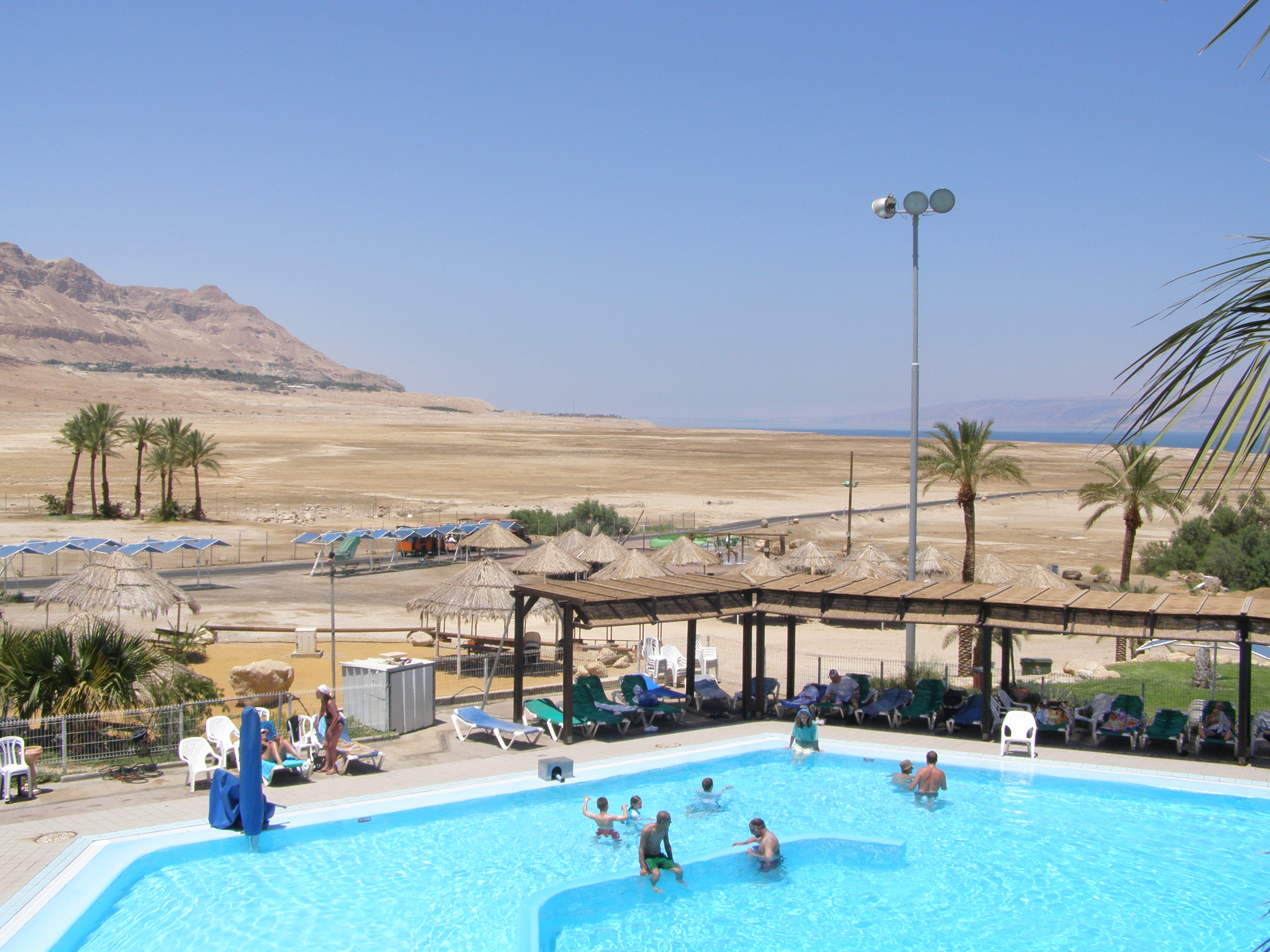
Ein Gedi spa

Ein Gedi Spa was a wellness center along the Dead Sea, Israel, fed by the waters of the Dead Sea and is now permanently closed due to sinkholes that threaten the area. It provided health by the four elements of the area: water, air, sun, and mud. The spa had hot pools that are filled with sulphur water. It was previously a famous attraction on the shore of the Dead Sea.

The spa was known for its unpleasant odor resulting from the sulphur springs. However, it still drew large crowds who believed in its health benefits.

The spa was run by the Ein Gedi Kibbutz.

Initially built directly along the shoreline of the Dead Sea, due to the sea's shrinkage, the spa was quite a distance from the lake due to ongoing evaporation of the Dead Sea. The Spa is closed and desolated. The Spa closed March 2020. By then the seashore was 4 km away.

The annual Ein Gedi Race starts off at the spa's location.

== See also ==
- Medical tourism in Israel
- Tourism in Israel
- Dead Sea products
