= Sam Barsky =

American artist and internet celebrity

Sam Barsky (born 1974) is an American artist and internet celebrity. He knits sweaters of landmarks, then takes selfies in front of the landmarks while wearing them. He also knits sweaters of Jewish and other holidays.

His sweaters are knitted without a pattern, freehanding them as he goes along. His sweaters have been displayed in numerous galleries and at the American Visionary Arts Museum. As of January 11, 2022, he has knitted 155 sweaters free-handed.

In 2025, Barsky held his first ever museum show titled, “It’s Not the Same Without You,” featuring twenty of his signature sweaters and wearable art.

== Background ==
Barsky started knitting in 1999 after he dropped out of nursing school due to health issues, and first tried to teach himself how to knit from a book he borrowed from the library. Soon after, he met the owners of a local yarn shop, who taught him.

His first sweater was knitted in 2000 and featured a covered bridge and waterwheel. Other early sweaters depicted a waterfall, lake, river, and castle. He made a Twin Towers sweater before the September 11 attacks. His art is inspired by ‘anything that crosses his eye,’ suggesting his open-mindeness towards his work.

In 2017, an article about his sweaters was published on Imgur. Originally, he did not take selfies in front of landmarks, but later did. He has reportedly knitted 119 sweaters for his travels. Though he receives many requests, Barsky does not sell his sweaters because he says it is impossible to be a "human sweater mill."

== Images depicted on Barsky's sweaters ==
=== Landmarks ===
Some of the landmarks Barsky has featured are:

- The Golden Gate Bridge
- Times Square
- Stonehenge
- African Safari
- Western Wall
- Bahá'í gardens
- Dead Sea
- Ein Gedi
- Niagara Falls
- Eiffel Tower
- Oriole Park at Camden Yards
- Tower Bridge
- Hollywood sign
- Las Vegas Strip
- London Bridge (Lake Havasu City)

=== Holidays ===
- Hanukkah
- Sukkot
- Shavuot
- Passover
- Martin Luther King Jr. Day
- Groundhog Day

=== Other ===
- Field of pylons
- Coral reef
- Playing cards
- His 100th sweater he describes as his "sweater of sweaters."

Barsky has also knitted items other than sweaters, including a framed picture of the Beth Am sanctuary.

== Personal life ==
Barsky was raised Orthodox Jewish, and practices today as a Conservative Jew and is a kohein. He is married to his wife Deborah.

He has lupus and a neurological disorder, but he says he does not let it stand in the way of his knitting.
