= Dead Sea products =

Dead Sea products refers to cosmetic products based on materials extracted from the Dead Sea, such as salt, mud, and potash.

== History ==
Ziva Gilad, a spa technician, came up with the idea of marketing Dead Sea mud after watching women tourists scooping up the mud to take home. In 1988, a single stand selling bottles of Ahava body scrub to tourists earned $1 million. The Dead Sea Works is the world's fourth largest producer and supplier of potash products. The company also produces magnesium chloride, industrial salts, de-icers, bath salts, table salt, and raw materials for the cosmetic industry.

== Health benefits ==
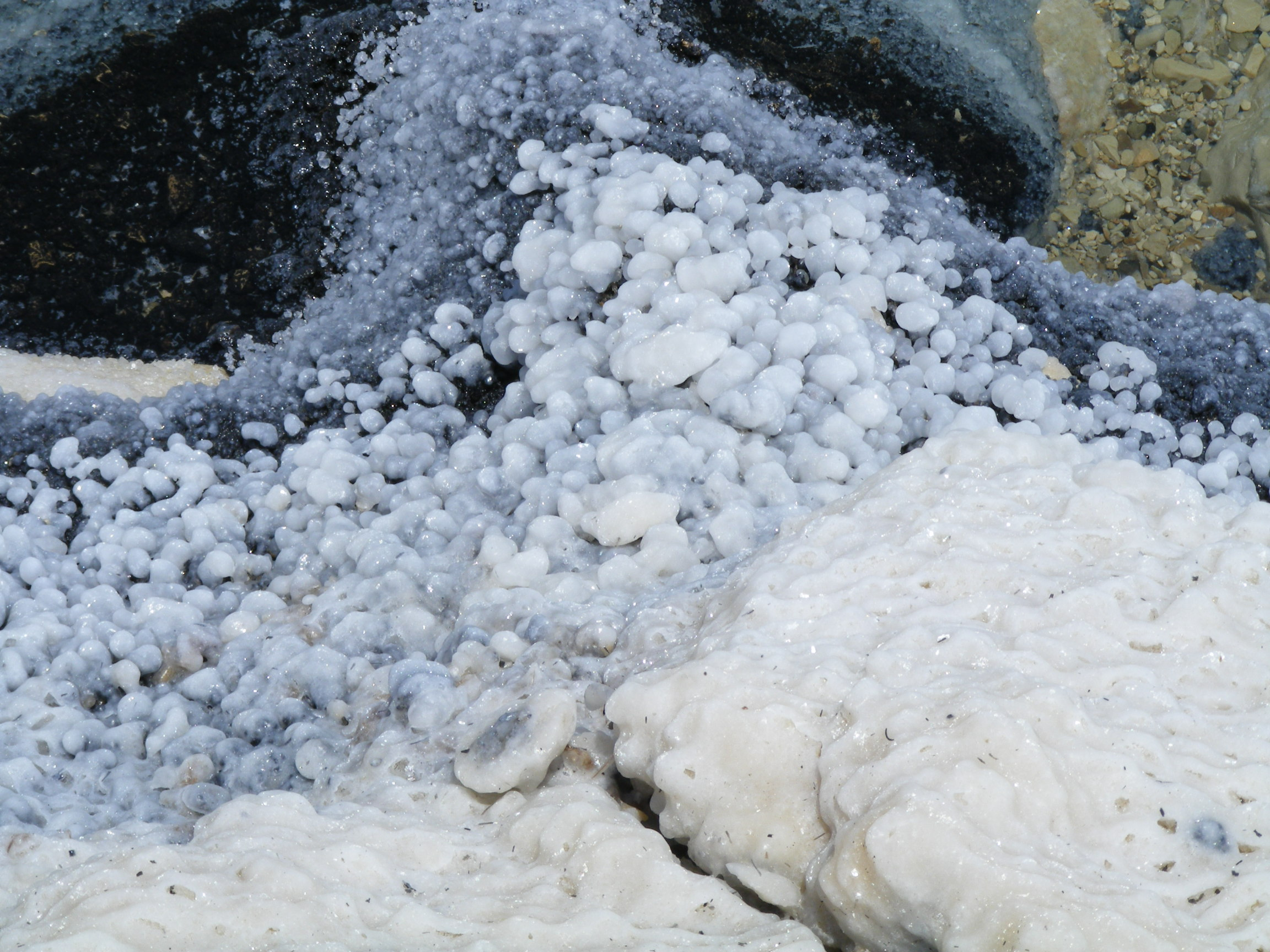
Dead sea salt

Dead Sea salt is rich in essential minerals like magnesium, calcium, and potassium, which contribute to skin hydration and therapeutic benefits. Magnesium, in particular, is known to improve the skin barrier function and reduce inflammation.

A 2007 study was published that tested the effectiveness of Dead Sea mouthwash and moisturizing cream on cancer patients who were experiencing dermatitis and mucositis while receiving a mixture of chemotherapy and radiotherapy. The study showed that the patients receiving the Dead Sea products saw an improvement in their condition, although further randomized studies were warranted.

Rhinosinusitis patients receiving Dead Sea saline nasal irrigation exhibited significantly better symptom relief compared to standard hypertonic saline spray.

== Mud pack therapy ==
Dead Sea mud pack therapy is believed to temporarily relieve pain in patients with osteoarthritis of the knees. According to researchers of the Ben Gurion University of the Negev, treatment with mineral-rich mud compresses can be used to augment conventional medical therapy.

== Salt bath therapy ==
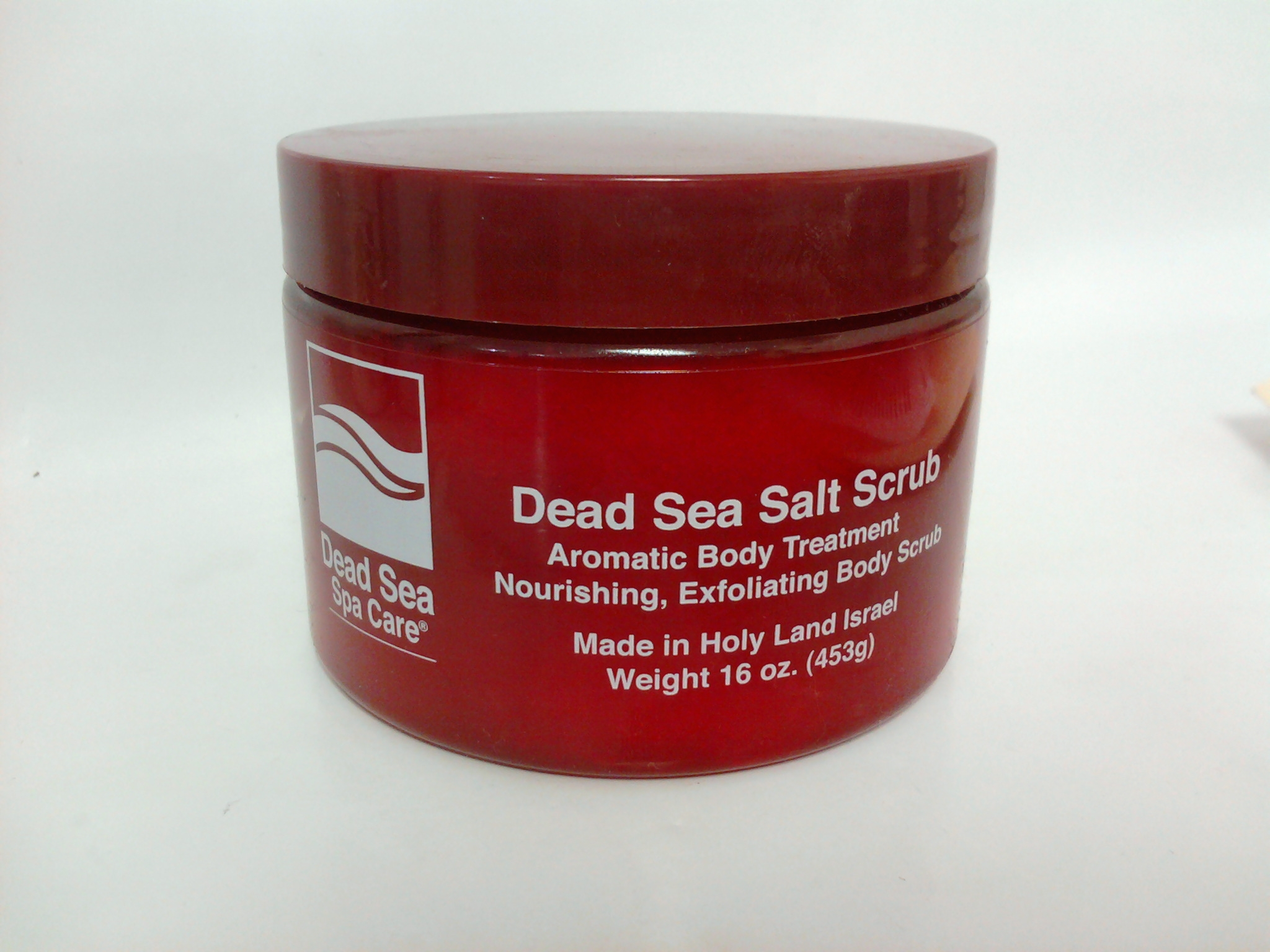
Dead sea salt body scrub

In 1989, an Israeli dermatologist tested the effect of Dead Sea salts on 50 patients with psoriasis. 47 patients out of 50 (94%) experienced significant relief. The most improvement was shown in patients who soaked in a solution of 1 kg (2 pounds) of salt 3 times a week for 6 weeks in a row.

== Criticism ==
=== Lack of long-term research ===
While some dermatologists claim that the minerals found in Dead Sea products can be helpful for ailments such as skin rashes, others have expressed skepticism due to a lack of long term scientific research backing up the claims.

=== Environmental damage ===
In July 2011, a Dead Sea Protection and Rehabilitation bill was proposed that would regulate the industry Dead Sea Works, as well as a bill that would tax products produced from Dead Sea components. The bill was supported by Gilad Erdan as well as by several members of the Knesset, but did not pass. Environmentalists have stated that the vaporizing of the sea's water to produce commercial products as well as the water being piped to hotels have contributed to the lowering of the Dead Sea's water levels.

=== Political issues ===
Some consumers and human rights groups have endorsed boycotts of Dead Sea products and other materials made in or along the West Bank of the Dead Sea, citing concerns such as blatant violation of human rights in Israel or of certain companies being "economically linked to Israel's illegal occupation of the Palestinian territories."

== See also ==
- Mineral spa
- Medical tourism in Israel
- Dead Sea
