= Barskoye, Sokolsky District, Vologda Oblast =

Barskoye Барское
- Village
- Location within Vologda Oblast Location within Russia
- Coordinates: 59°23′N 40°08′E
- Country: Russia
- Region: Vologda Oblast
- District: Sokolsky District
- Time zone: UTC+3:00

Barskoye (Russian: Барское) is a rural locality (a village) in Prigorodnoye Rural Settlement, Sokolsky District, Vologda Oblast, Russia. The population was 16 as of 2002.

== Geography ==
Barskoye is located 11 km southeast of Sokol (the district's administrative centre) by road. Shastovo is the nearest rural locality.
