= Ein Gedi Mineral Water =

Israeli brand of bottled water

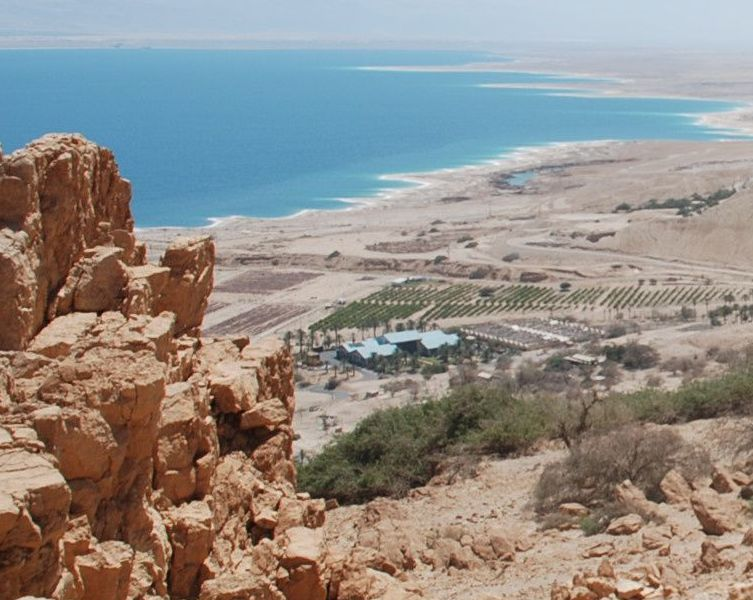
- Ein Gedi Mineral Water bottling plant in Kibbutz Ein Gedi, Israel
- Industry: Bottled Water
- Founded: 1997; 29 years ago
- Net income: 10 million ILS (2017)
- Website: eingedimineralwater.co.il

Ein Gedi Mineral Water (Hebrew: עין גדי) is a brand of bottled water that has been in production since 1997. By 2017 it had a 34% share of the market in Israel. The water used in its production comes from the Ein Gedi nature reserve.

Following a deal signed in 2004, the company was jointly owned by Ein Gedi Kibbutz and Jafora-Tabori.

A boycott of Ein Gedi water was proposed out of concern that its production could result in the Ein Gedi oasis drying up.
