= Akhmerovsky Forest =

Coordinates: 53°36′10″N 56°15′41″E

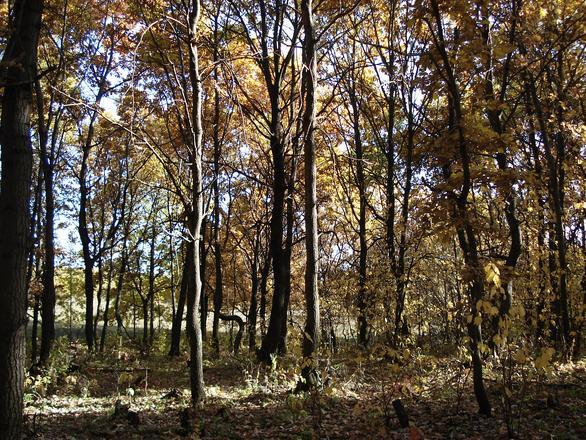
Akhmerovsky Forest

Akhmerovsky Forest (Bashkir: Әхмәр урманы, Russian: лес Ахмеровский) is a forest in the northwestern part of Ishimbaysky District of Bashkortostan (Russia). It covers an area of 15 km² and is located approximately 18 km from Sterlitamak and 21 km from Ishimbay.

The principal tree species in Akhmerovsky Forest are oak and lime.

== See also ==
- Barsky Forest
