= Tim Barsky =

American musician

Tim Barsky is an American musician from Boston, Massachusetts. Based in the San Francisco Bay Area, he is a beatboxer-instrumentalist, playwright-performer, and urban circus artist. He is a graduate of Brown University with a degree in Islamic and Judaic religious studies. He also studied at the Berklee School of Music and with the Chasidic folklorist and archivist Fishel Bresler.

Trained as a traditional Jewish storyteller, his use of contemporary culture within traditional forms resulted in The Bright River, an underground theatrical piece that achieved cult status within the Bay area. In 2007 he was awarded a $50,000 Gerbode Emerging Playwright's Grant for Track in a Box, a hip hop and circus based play about junkie police, strippers and giant puppets which was set to premiere in Fall 2009.

His work has been produced and performed at The Brava Theatre (2006–08), Climate Theatre (2008; also artist-in-residence), Yerba Buena Center for the Arts in San Francisco (2005), Julia Morgan Theatre in Berkeley (2004–05), Traveling Jewish Theatre in San Francisco (2004), The Exit Theatre in San Francisco (2003), The Finborough Theatre in London (2002), and AS220 in Providence, Rhode Island (1997–2001).

A former line-producer for the Burning Man Arts Festival, and a member of the Hybrid Project at San Francisco's Intersection for the Arts, he has been a guest artist and lecturer at the Royal College of Art (London), Stanford University, RISD, and Oberlin College; a featured speaker at The American Press Institute; and a beatboxing instructor in San Francisco juvenile detention facilities.

He was the artistic director of City Circus from 2007 - 2010 and a co-founder of Vowel Movement Beatboxers.

== See also ==
- Flute beatboxing
- Busking
