= Ein Gedi (kibbutz) =

Kibbutz in southern Israel

Ein Gedi: עין גדי (Hebrew)
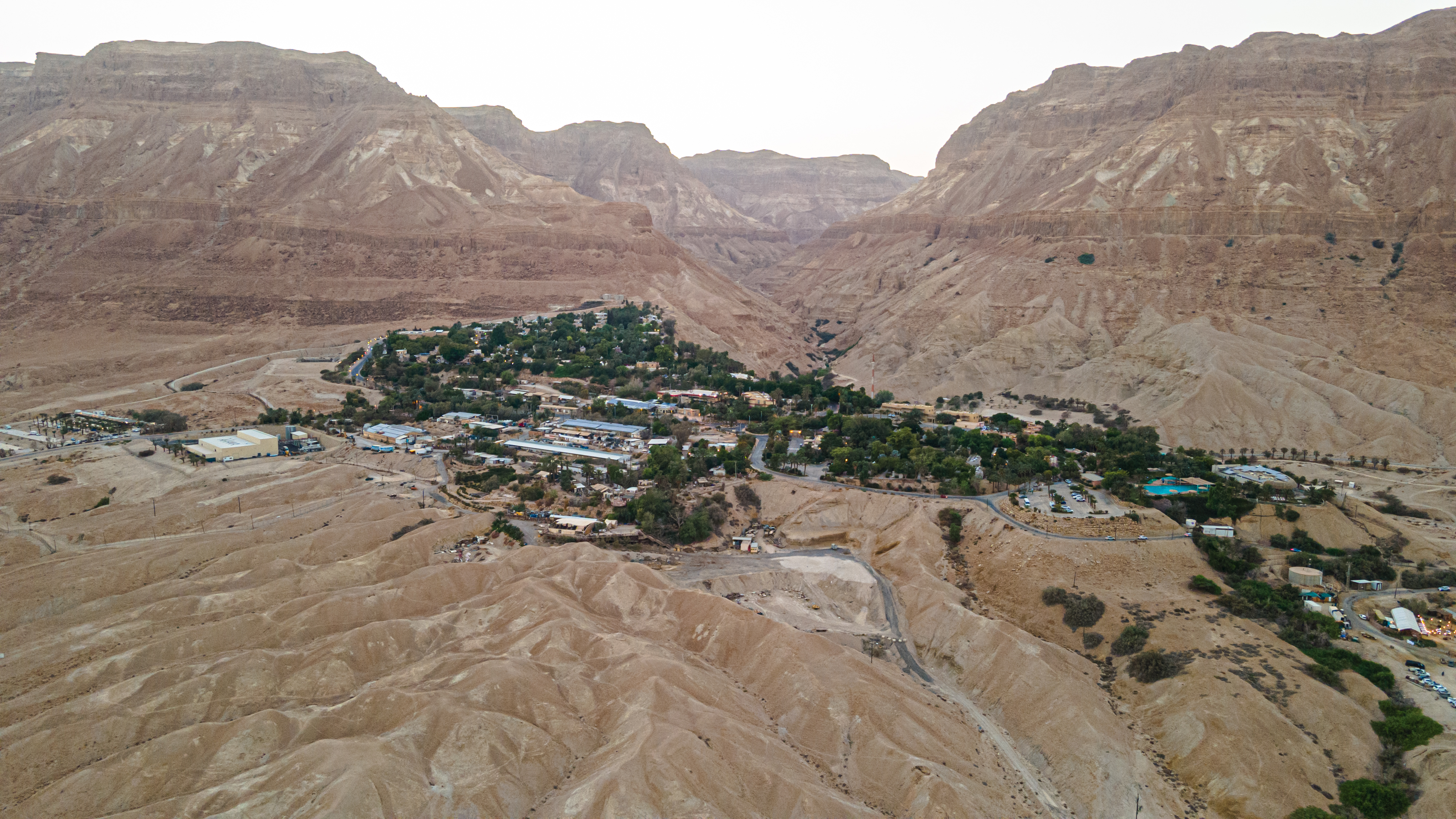
- Etymology: Spring of the Kid
- Location within the Southern West Bank Location within Israel
- Coordinates: 31°27′8″N 35°23′7″E
- Country: Israel
- District: Southern
- Subdistrict: Beersheba
- Council: Tamar
- Affiliation: Kibbutz Movement
- Founded: 1953
- Founder: Nahal
- Population (2024): 718
- Website: www.eingedi.co.il

Ein Gedi (Hebrew: עין גדי, lit. 'Spring of the Kid') is a kibbutz on the western shore of the Dead Sea in Israel. Located on the edge of the Judaean Desert at the site of historic Ein Gedi, it falls under the jurisdiction of Tamar Regional Council. In 2024 it had a population of 718.

The Ein Gedi Nature Reserve is located just to the north, featuring an oasis, waterfalls, and hiking trails. It also contains the remains of a Ghassulian temple dating to the 4th millennium BCE. Adjacent to the reserve is the Ein Gedi Antiquities area, home to the ruins of the ancient Jewish village of Ein Gedi, including a Roman-era synagogue.

== History ==
The kibbutz was founded in 1953. It was named after the ancient Jewish city of Ein Gedi, located on Tel Goren (Arabic: Tell el-Jurn) beside the kibbutz. Located on the edge of the Green Line separating Israel from the Jordanian-held West Bank, the kibbutz was completely isolated in the desert, the nearest Israeli village being several hours away via a dirt road. After the 1967 Six-Day War and Israel's capture of the West Bank from Jordan, a road was paved from Jerusalem via Jericho and along the shore of the Dead Sea. This essentially ended the kibbutz's isolation and opened the door to its development.

The gradual drying of the Dead Sea over a period of several decades has led to sinkholes appearing around it. This affected Ein Gedi, with hundreds appearing annually by the early 21st century; two people fell into sinkholes in the 1990s. The sinkholes and changing environment around the Dead Sea impacted the kibbutz's infrastructure and economy: a road had to be diverted and a newly built bridge abandoned due to safety concerns, the campsite was closed, and the Ein Gedi Spa was closed as it was no longer near the shore.

== Economy ==
Ein Gedi is primarily involved with agriculture and tourism of the surrounding area and neighboring antiquities. In 1997, the kibbutz opened a facility to bottle the water of the Ein Gedi spring. The product is known as Ein Gedi Mineral Water. This led to controversy regarding the reselling of a public resource.

In April 2022, Ahava opened a factory in Ein Gedi; it had 100 employees and a visitor center.

== Botanical garden ==
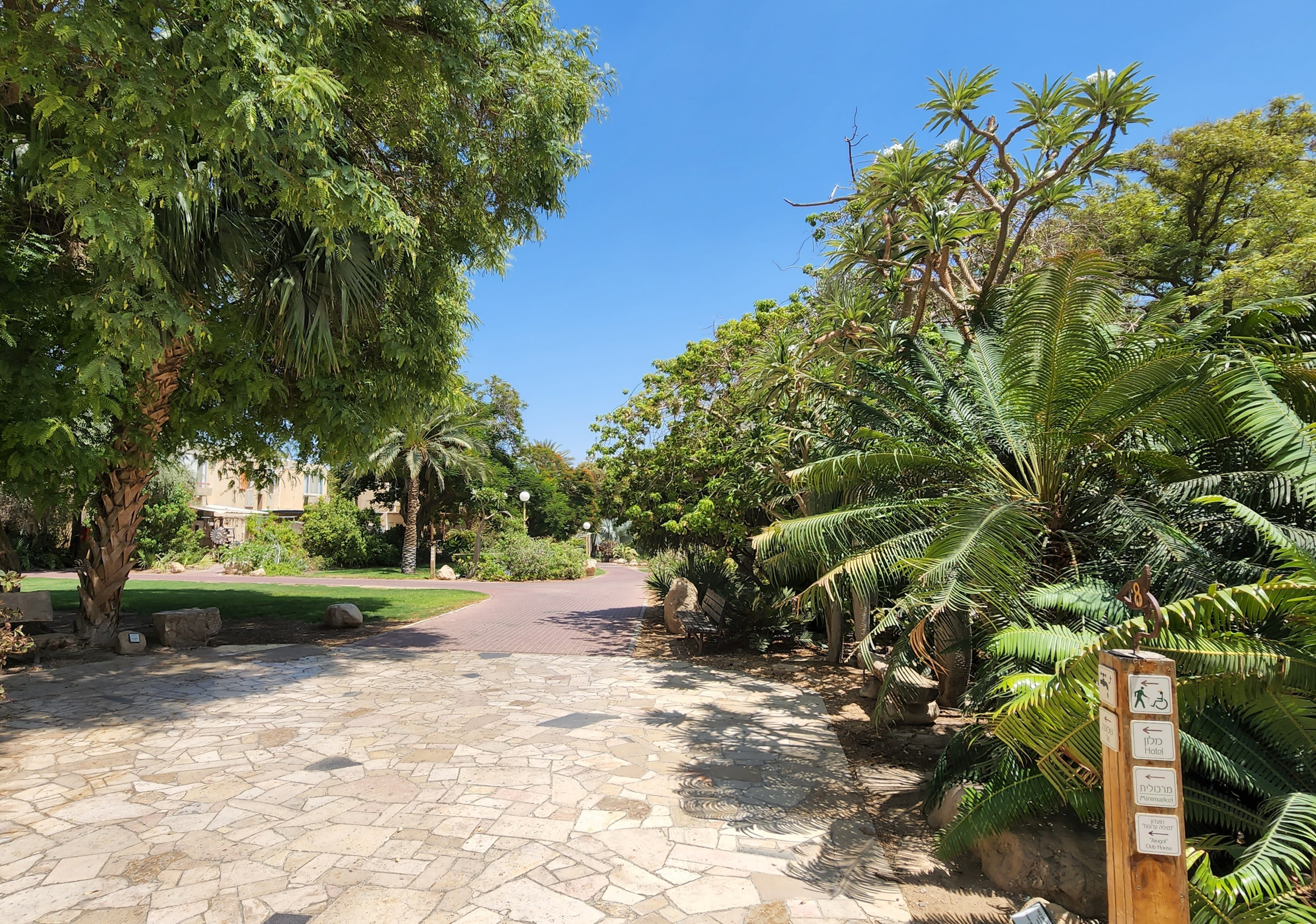
Botanical garden of Ein Gedi

The kibbutz operates a 100 dunam (10 ha, 24.7 acre) botanical garden housing over 900 plant species from around the world. It is the only populated botanical garden in the world. The garden joined the register of the Botanic Gardens Conservation International in 1994. The garden includes date palms and Arecaceae, tropical and desert flora.

== Eco park ==
The kibbutz is home to the Ein Gedi Eco Park, which functions as both a zoo and an environmental education center, demonstrating sustainable technologies such as solar cookers, greywater systems, mud buildings, and compost toilets.

== Climate ==
Ein Gedi has a hot desert climate (Köppen climate classification: BWh) typical for the Dead Sea area, with very hot and dry summers, and mild to warm, dry winters with very little rainfall. The average annual temperature is 23.9 °C (75.0 °F), and around 50 mm of precipitation falls annually. it is one of the driest places in Israel.

Climate data for Ein Gedi
Month	Jan	Feb	Mar	Apr	May	Jun	Jul	Aug	Sep	Oct	Nov	Dec	Year
Mean daily maximum °C (°F)	20.4 (68.7)	22 (72)	25.5 (77.9)	29.9 (85.8)	34.4 (93.9)	37 (99)	38.3 (100.9)	38.1 (100.6)	35.9 (96.6)	33.2 (91.8)	28.4 (83.1)	22.3 (72.1)	30.5 (86.9)
Daily mean °C (°F)	15.1 (59.2)	16.2 (61.2)	19.1 (66.4)	22.9 (73.2)	26.9 (80.4)	29.6 (85.3)	31 (88)	31.3 (88.3)	29.6 (85.3)	26.6 (79.9)	21.9 (71.4)	16.8 (62.2)	23.9 (75.1)
Mean daily minimum °C (°F)	9.8 (49.6)	10.5 (50.9)	12.7 (54.9)	16 (61)	19.5 (67.1)	22.2 (72.0)	23.8 (74.8)	24.5 (76.1)	23.3 (73.9)	20.1 (68.2)	15.4 (59.7)	11.4 (52.5)	17.4 (63.4)
Average precipitation mm (inches)	10 (0.4)	11 (0.4)	8 (0.3)	5 (0.2)	1 (0.0)	0 (0)	0 (0)	0 (0)	0 (0)	2 (0.1)	4 (0.2)	10 (0.4)	50 (2.0)

== Sports ==
The Ein Gedi race, also known as the Shalom Marathon – Dead Sea Half Marathon, is a popular road running event over several distances that has been held by the Tamar Regional Council since 1983. The starting point for all races is the Ein Gedi Spa, 80 kilometers (50 mi) southeast of Jerusalem and 4 kilometers south of Kibbutz Ein Gedi.

== See also ==
- Ein Gedi (archaeological site)
- Ein Gedi Nature Reserve
