= Barskoye, Gryazovetsky District, Vologda Oblast =

Barskoye Барское
- Village
- Location within Vologda Oblast Location within Russia
- Coordinates: 58°49′N 39°59′E
- Country: Russia
- Region: Vologda Oblast
- District: Gryazovetsky District
- Time zone: UTC+3:00

Barskoye (Russian: Барское) is a rural locality (a village) in Yurovskoye Rural Settlement, Gryazovetsky District, Vologda Oblast, Russia. The population was 15 as of 2002.

== Geography ==
Barskoye is located 20 km (12 mi) southwest of Gryazovets (the district's administrative centre) by road. Prokopyevo is the nearest rural locality.
