= Judaean Desert =

Desert in the southern Levant

Coordinates: 31°42′N 35°18′E

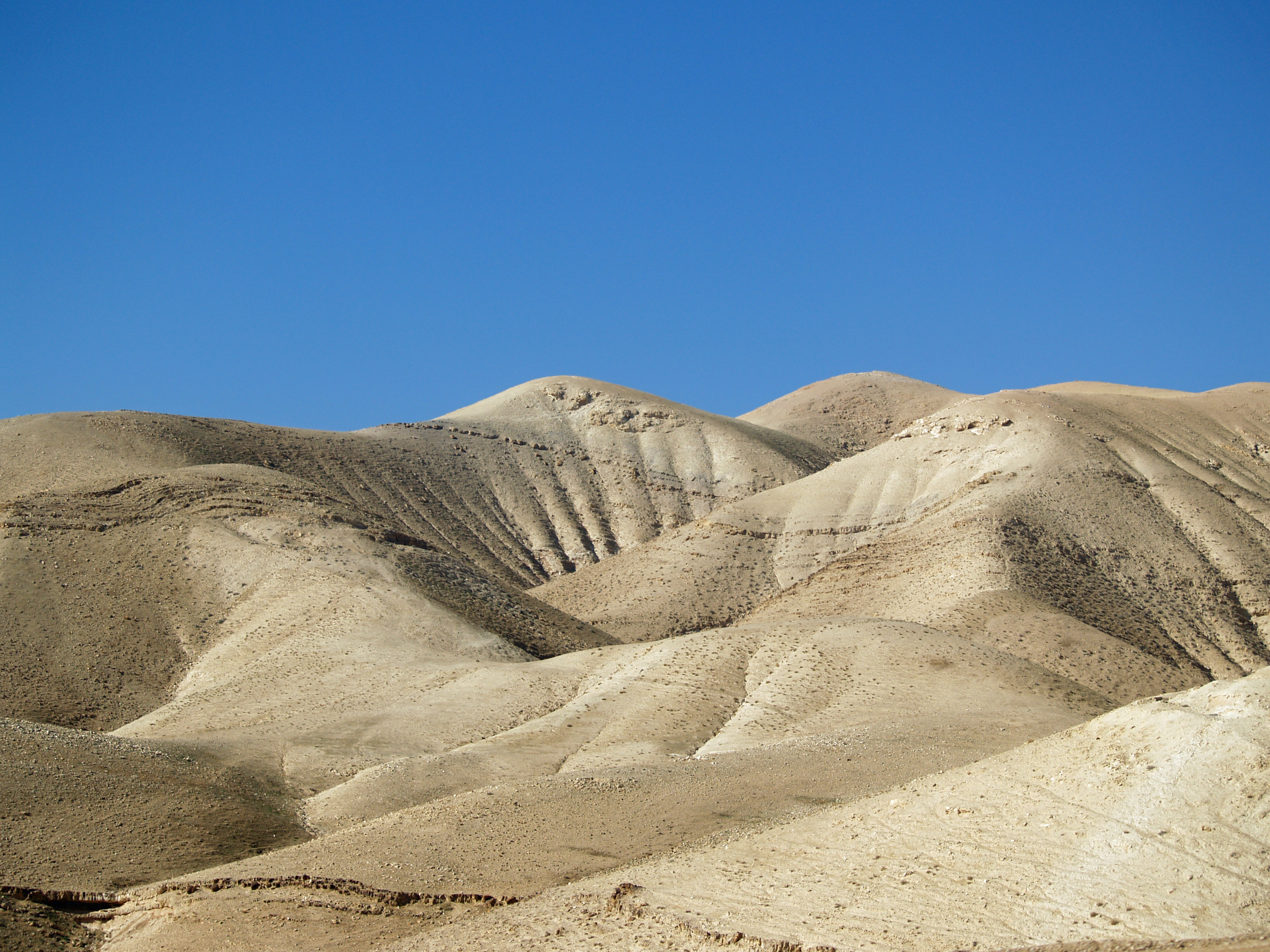
Judaean Desert

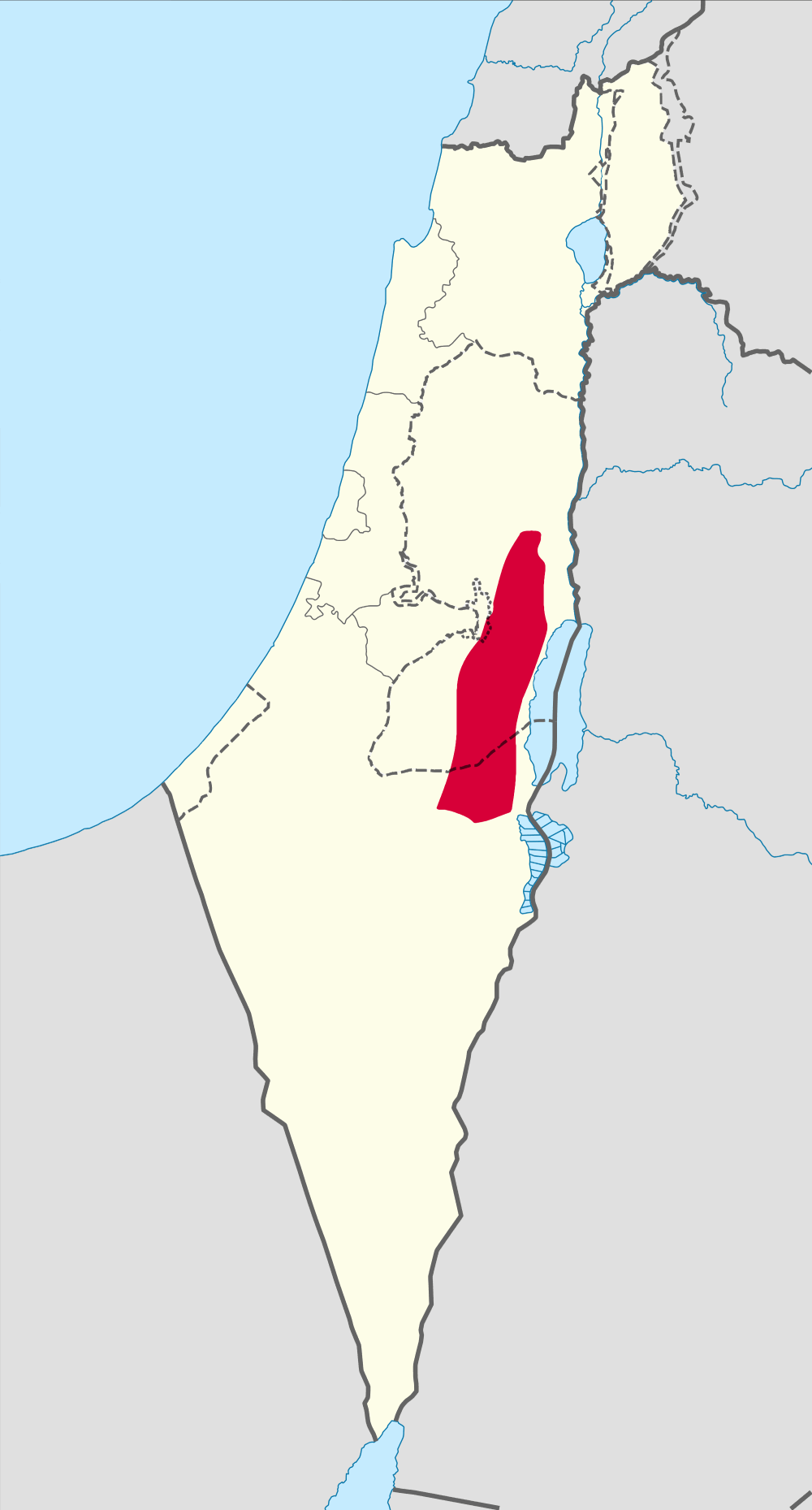
Location of Judaean Desert in Israel and the West Bank in red

The Judaean Desert or Judean Desert (Hebrew: מִדְבַּר יְהוּדָה, romanized: Midbar Yehuda, Arabic: برية الخليل, romanized: Bariyat al-Khalil) is a desert in the West Bank and Israel that stretches east of the ridge of the Judaean Mountains and in their rain shadow, so east of Jerusalem, and descends to the Dead Sea.

The Judaean Desert has historically functioned as a place of refuge for rebels and displaced populations. According to the Hebrew Bible, David took shelter there while fleeing from King Saul. The Hasmonean rulers of Judaea, and their successor, Herod the Great, built several monumental fortresses in the region, including Herodium, Hyrcania, and Masada. In the period of the Jewish–Roman Wars, the desert became a key theater of conflict, with Roman forces besieging major strongholds. Caves in the area, such as the Cave of Letters and the Cave of Horrors, later served as hiding places for Jewish refugees, preserving personal documents, religious texts, skeletons, weapons, clothing, and household items—thanks to the region's arid climate. The desert also attracted religious sects, including the classical-era Jewish ascetics of Qumran (likely Essenes) and Byzantine-era Christian monks who practiced spiritual isolation in local lavras.

Under the name El-Bariyah, it has been nominated to the Tentative List of World Heritage Sites in the West Bank and Israel, particularly for its monastic ruins.

== Etymology ==
'Desert of Judaea' (Hebrew: מִדְבַּר יְהוּדָה) originates in the Hebrew Bible (Tanakh), where the term is mentioned in the Book of Judges and Psalms.

It is sometimes known as יְשִׁימוֹן Yeshimon, meaning desert or wildland, or yet Wilderness of Judah or Wilderness of Judaea, among others.

Similarly, the Arabic name برية الخليل, Bariyat El-Khalil (sometimes stylized 'El-Bariyah') means Wilderness of Hebron.

== Geography ==
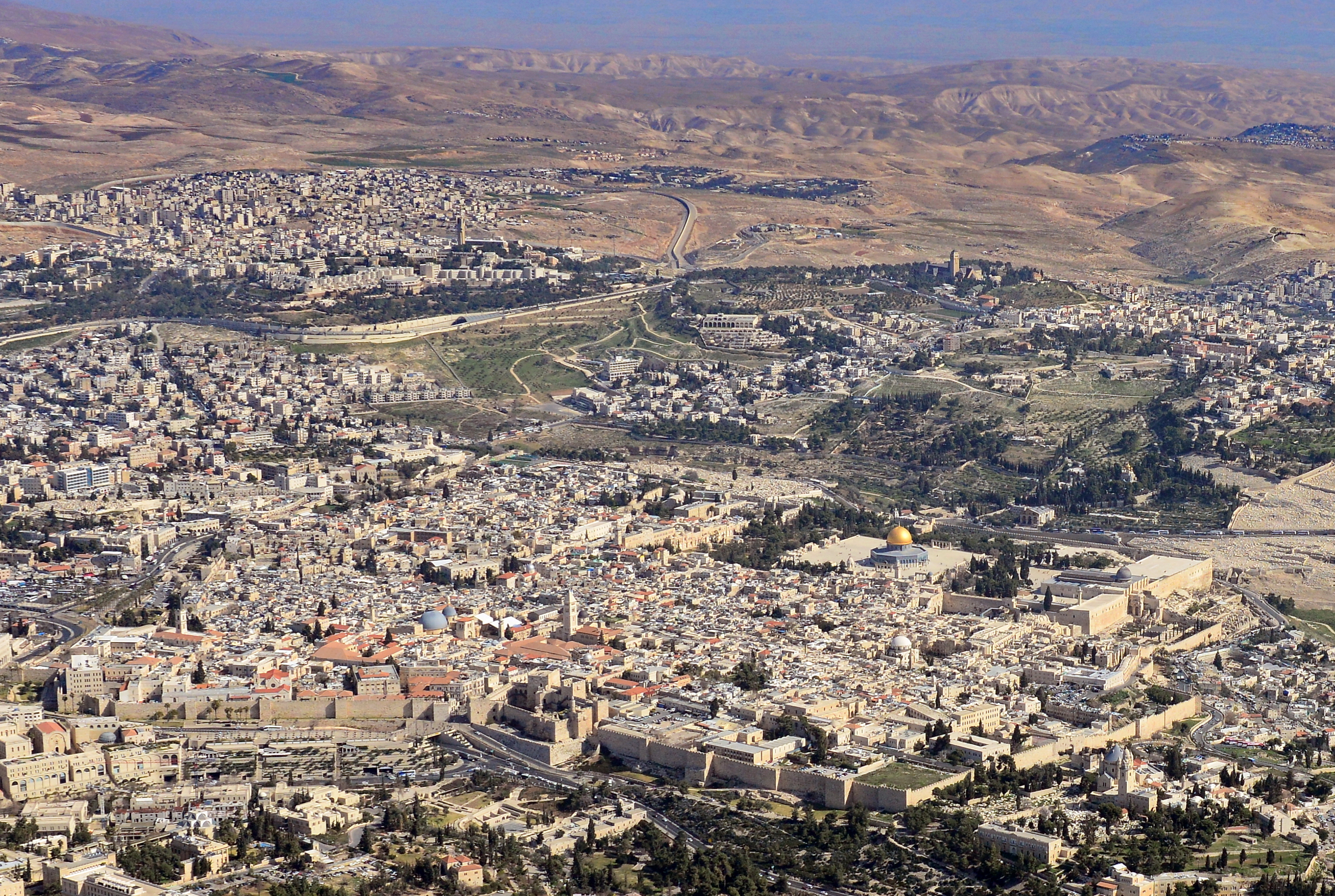
The Judaean Desert lies just east of Jerusalem. The Old City appears in the foreground, and the desert in the background.

The Judaean Desert lies east of Jerusalem and descends to the Dead Sea. The Judaean Desert stretches from the northeastern Negev to the east of Beit El, and is marked by natural terraces with escarpments. It ends in a steep escarpment dropping to the Dead Sea and the Jordan Valley. The Judaean Desert is characterized by the topography of a plateau that ends in the east in a cliff. It is crossed by numerous wadis flowing from west to east and has many ravines, most of them deep, from 366 metres (1,201 ft) in the west to 183 metres (600 ft) in the east. The Judaean Desert is an area with a special morphological structure along the east of the Judaean Mountains.

A study by the Hebrew University of Jerusalem of an underground water reservoir beneath the Judaean Desert known as the Judaea Group Aquifer, found that the aquifer begins in the Judaean Mountains and flows in a northeasterly direction towards the Dead Sea with outflows at the Tsukim, Kane, Samar and Ein-Gedi springs. The rain-fed aquifer contains an average yearly volume of some 100 million m^{3} (3.5 billion cu ft) of water.

== Climate ==
Rainfall in the Judea region varies from 400–500 millimetres (16–20 in) in the western hills, rising to 600 millimetres (24 in) around western Jerusalem (in central Judaea), falling back to 400 millimetres (16 in) in eastern Jerusalem and dropping to around 100 mm (3.9 in) in the eastern parts, due to a rainshadow effect. The climate ranges from Mediterranean in the west and desert climate in the east, with a strip of steppe climate in the middle.

== Flora and fauna ==
Rock hyraxes and Nubian ibex live on the desert plateau and the Dead Sea cliffs. Until quite recently, there were Arabian leopards in the area, but they are now extinct in the area due to illegal hunting. For the last time, an Arabian leopard was spotted in Ein Feshkha.

Common birds in the area include the fan-tailed raven, blackstart, tristram's starling, apus, hirundo, Arabian babbler, wheatear, and sand partridge.

The Judaean Desert is home to a variety of reptiles, including venomous vipers like Echis coloratus and Atractaspis engaddensis (also known as the Israeli mole viper). The streams are home to various fish and amphibians.

== History ==
=== Biblical references ===
According to the Hebrew Bible, David and his men fled into the Judaean Desert to hide from Saul. The Book of Samuel mentions several locations within the Judaean Desert that David visited during his escape from Saul, including the Wilderness of Ziph, Wilderness of Ma'on, the Crags of Wild Goats ("Tzuri Ya'alim") and the Wilderness of Ein Gedi. When David hides in the strongholds at Ein Gedi, Saul seeks him "even upon the most craggy rocks, which are accessible only to wild goats" (1 Samuel 24:2). Psalm 63, subtitled a Psalm of David when he was in the wilderness of Judah, has been associated with David's sojourn in the desert of En-gedi.

In the 7th century BCE—and possibly as early as the reign of King Hezekiah (reign c. 716/15–687/86 BCE)—the Kingdom of Judah began expanding into the Judaean Desert. This included the establishment of a royal outpost, followed by the founding of a larger settlement at Ein Gedi in the mid-7th century BCE. The settlement soon developed into a key economic hub, benefiting from the Dead Sea's natural resources and the cultivation of Judean date palms. It flourished until its destruction in the 580s BCE, possibly during an Edomite raid following the Babylonian conquest of Judah.

=== Hasmonean and Herodian periods ===
Several desert fortresses were constructed in the Judaean Desert under Hasmonean and Herodian rule. These forts were constructed atop mountains or in secluded mountain range spurs. Dok, thought to be the oldest, was constructed around 167 BCE. The second fort, Hyrcania, was likely constructed by John Hyrcanus (ruled 134-104 BCE). Alexander Janneus, his son (r. 103 to 76 BCE), is thought to have founded Masada. Herod later established Herodium, which housed a royal complex including one of his palaces and his mausoleum. Cypros, which the Hasmoneans most likely built, was also rebuilt by Herod. Alexandrium and Machaerus, two further desert strongholds, were constructed elsewhere (Samaria and Perea, respectively).

The Essenes, an ascetic Jewish sect, lived in the Judaean Desert on the Dead Sea's northwestern shore, according to Pliny the Elder. Many modern scholars and archaeologists concur that the Essenes resided in Qumran, an archeological site discovered about 1.5 kilometers (1 mi) from the Dead Sea's northwest shore. According to conventional archeology, the Dead Sea Scrolls, which were found in the Qumran Caves, were written by Essenes.

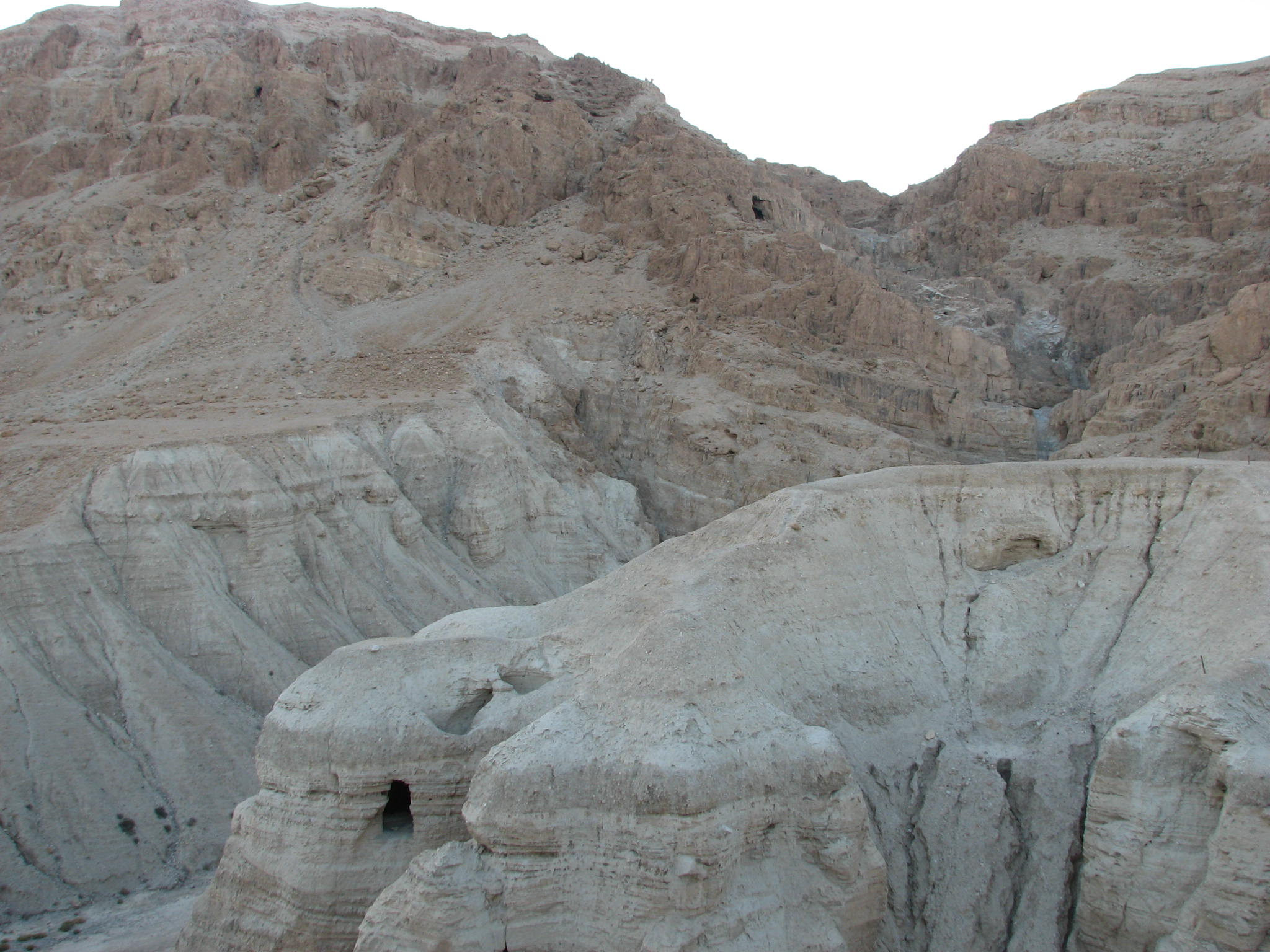
The Dead Sea Scrolls were discovered in the caves surrounding Qumran.

=== Jewish–Roman Wars ===
During the First Jewish–Roman War (67–73 CE) and the Bar Kokhba revolt (132-135 CE), Jewish rebels took advantage of the Judaean Desert's natural characteristics for refuge and guerilla warfare. The siege of Masada, which took place there circa 73 CE, was one of the pivotal battles of the conflict. According to Flavius Josephus, early in the conflict, Jewish Sicarii took control of Masada, and from there they launched raids against communities in the Dead Sea region. The Roman Legio X Fretensis rose on Masada in eight camps, and constructed a large siege ramp. Josephus claimed that the siege ended in a mass suicide, when the 960 Sicarii rebels present decided to kill themselves rather than be sold into slavery.

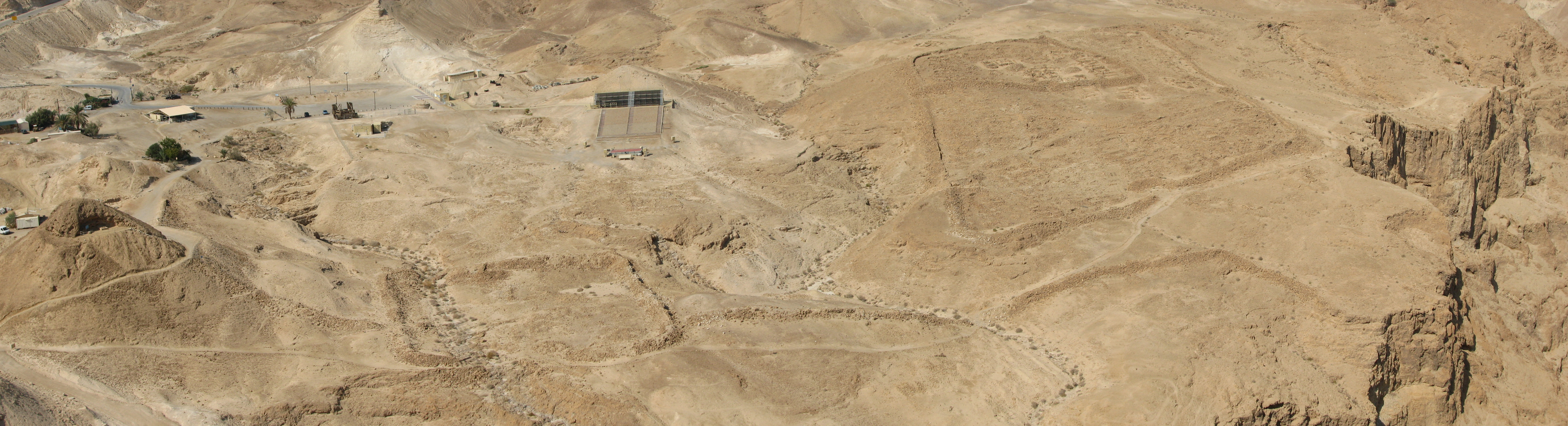
Main Roman camps surrounding Masada with a wall. View to the West

During the latter phase of the Bar Kokhba revolt, Jewish refugees and their families escaped to refuge caves, especially following the fall of Betar in 135 CE. Many of these caves were found nestled in the deep ravines of the Judaean Desert, near intermittent streams. As of 2019, over 30 refuge caves have been discovered in the Judaean Desert, including those situated in Nahal Michmas, the Almisiya cave, the Murabba'at caves in Nahal Darga, the pool cave in Nahal David, the Cave of Horror and the Cave of Letters (where the letters Simon bar Kokhba wrote to the residents of En Gedi and the Babatha archive were discovered) in Nahal Hever, and three caves in Tze'elim Stream.

=== Early Christian monasticism ===
The Judaean Desert is connected with early forms of Christian monasticism. There are examples of Desert Fathers and Desert Mothers and a number of other influential Christian figures, some of which spent much of their lives in the desert as hermits or as members of monastic communities of the lavra or the cenobium type, or on the fringe of the desert in or near settled places such as Bethlehem and Jerusalem, but are still considered to belong to the same monastic environment. A short chronological list can include Chariton the Confessor (mid-3rd century – c. 350), Hilarion the Great (291–371), Euthymius the Great (377–473) and his associate Theoctistus of Palestine (died 451 or 467), Jerome (c. 342/47–420) with his associates Paula of Rome (347–404) and her daughter Eustochium (c. 368–419/20) as well as Tyrannius Rufinus (344/45–411), Melania the Elder (ca. 350–417?) and her granddaughter Melania the Younger (c. 383–439), Mary of Egypt (c. 344–421), Gerasimus of the Jordan (5th century), Saint George of Choziba, Theodosius the Cenobiarch (c. 423–529) and his contemporary Sabbas the Sanctified (439–532), at whose monastery John of Damascus (c. 675/76–749?) spent much of his life. Cyriacus the Anchorite (448–557) knew Euthymius and Gerasimus and led for many years the Souka of Hilarion. Cyril of Scythopolis (c. 525–559) wrote about the desert monasticism of his time, as did John Moschus (c. 550–619).

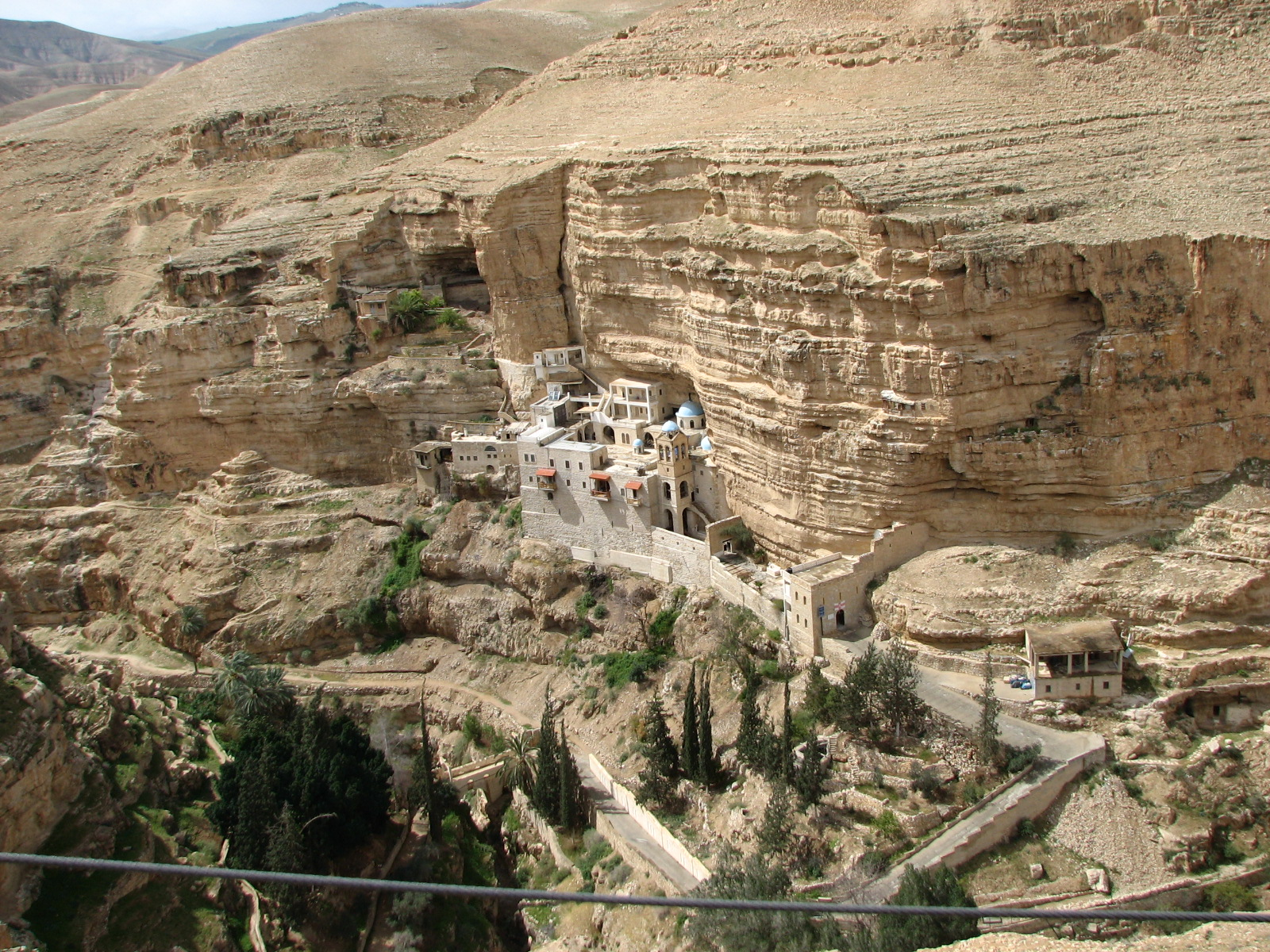
Greek Orthodox Monastery of St. George in Wadi Qelt.

== Archeology ==
The Judaean Desert has been the site of many archeological discoveries. The Dead Sea Scrolls, a collection of ancient Jewish religious manuscripts dating from the 3rd century BCE to the 1st century CE, were discovered in the 1940s at the Qumran Caves. They are considered to be a keystone in the history of archaeology with great historical, religious, and linguistic significance because they include the oldest surviving manuscripts of entire books later included in the biblical canons, along with deuterocanonical and extra-biblical manuscripts which preserve evidence of the diversity of religious thought in late Second Temple Judaism. At the same time they cast new light on the emergence of Christianity and of Rabbinic Judaism.

Numerous caves in the Judaean Desert have yielded significant archaeological discoveries linked to the Jewish–Roman wars, as they served as shelters for Jewish rebels during that time. In the Cave of Letters at Nahal Hever, a plethora of artifacts from the Roman period has been unearthed, including various letters and fragments of papyri. Notable among these findings are letters exchanged between Simon bar Kokhba and his subordinates during the Bar Kokhba revolt, and the Babatha papyri cache, a collection of legal documents belonging to Babatha, a Jewish woman landowner who lived during the 2nd century CE.

Excavations at the site of ancient Ein Gedi reveal a Judahite settlement that existed during the Iron Age, was destroyed in the 6th century BCE, and rebuilt in the 5th century BCE. Despite periods of decline and prosperity, the site continued to host a Jewish population until the 7th century CE. In late antiquity, it was home to a synagogue, the remains of which are still visible today. In the "Cave of the Swords" near Ein Gedi, archaeologists uncovered a 7th-century BCE inscription carved into a stalactite and written in Paleo-Hebrew script. A 2023 survey of the same cave revealed a rare cache of 2nd-century Roman weaponry—including four swords and a pilum—hidden in a nearly inaccessible crevice in the upper level. The assemblage appears to have been seized from Roman forces and concealed by Jewish rebels during the Bar Kokhba revolt. In 2025, scientists using more sophisticated imaging equipment returned to the site and discovered a four-line inscription written in ancient Aramaic, of which they were able to decipher the message "Abba of Naburya has perished."

Finds from the Neolithic, including statues, masks, wooden and bone tools, skulls and reed basketry, were found in a cave at Nahal Heimar.

== Gallery ==
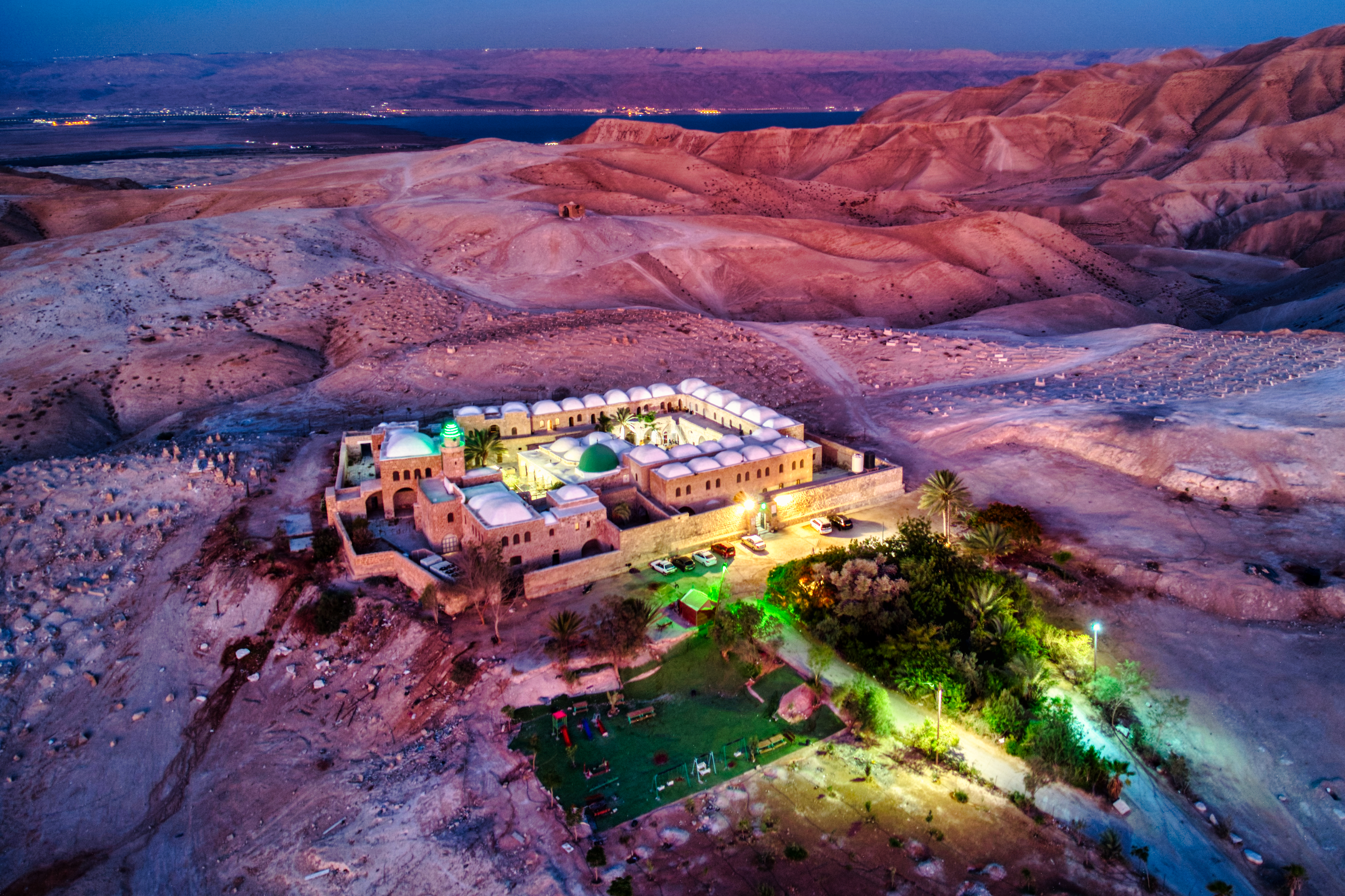
Nabi Musa - Sunset in June 2022

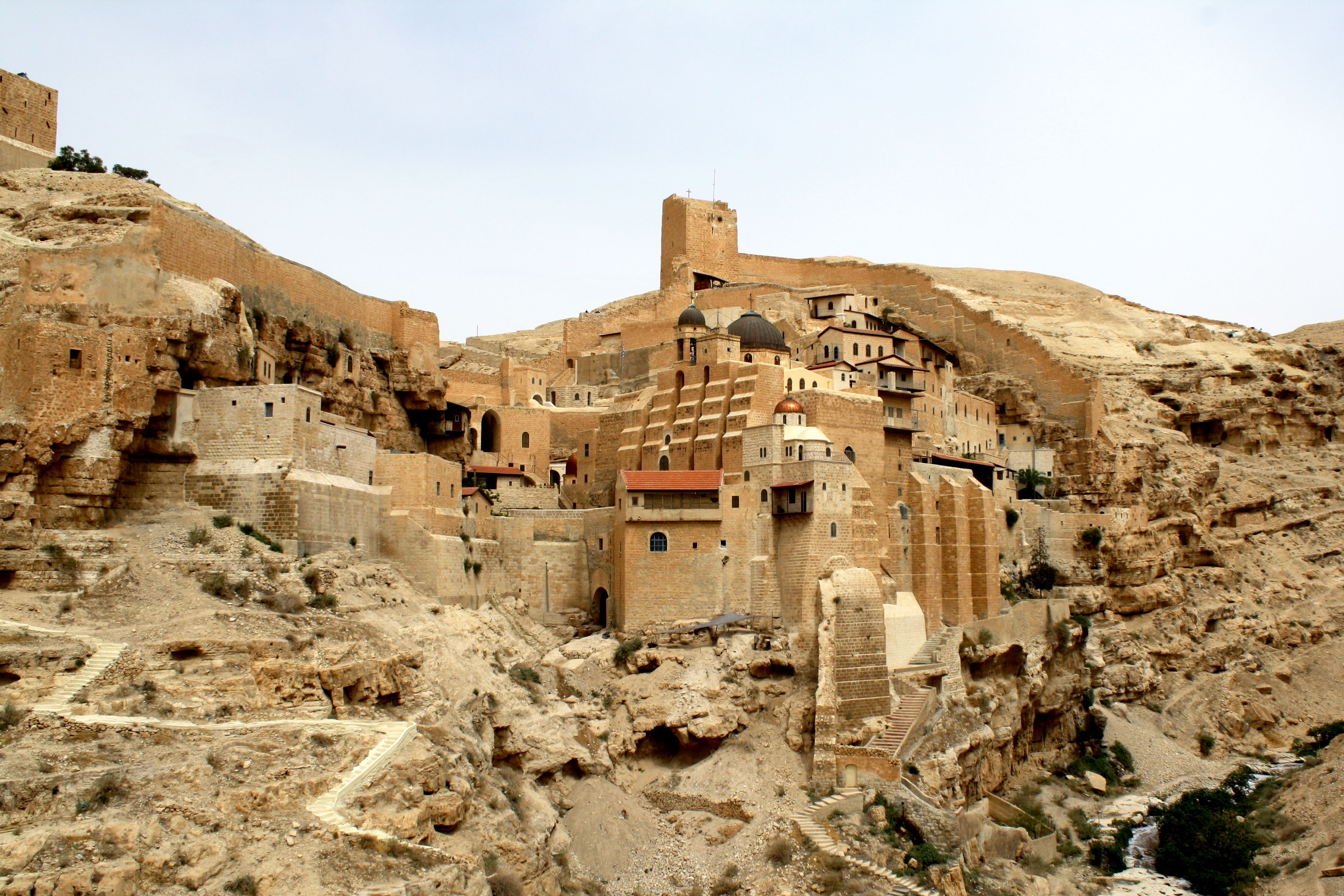
The Monastery of Mar Saba, near Bethlehem

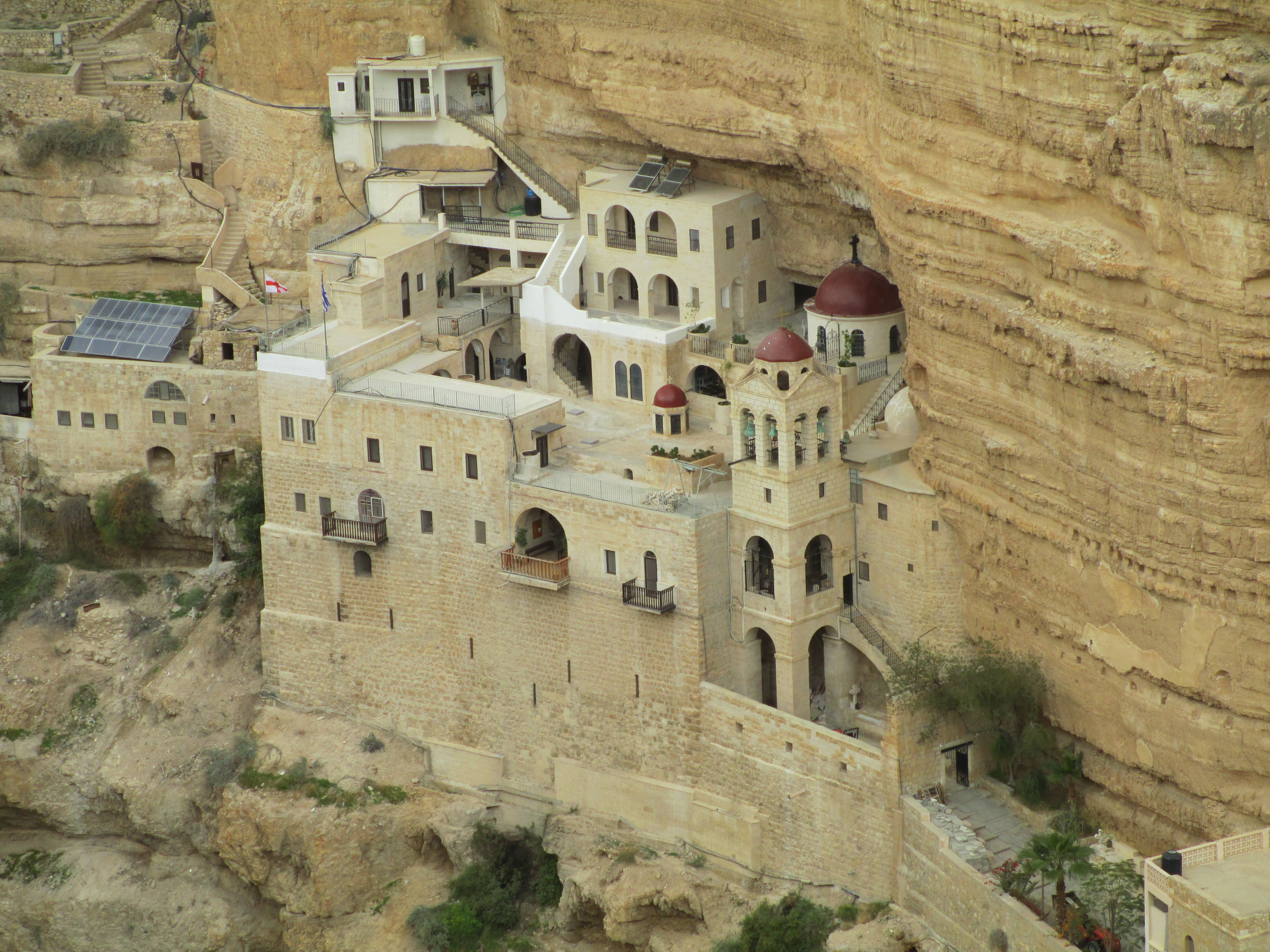
The Monastery of Saint George of Choziba, near Jericho

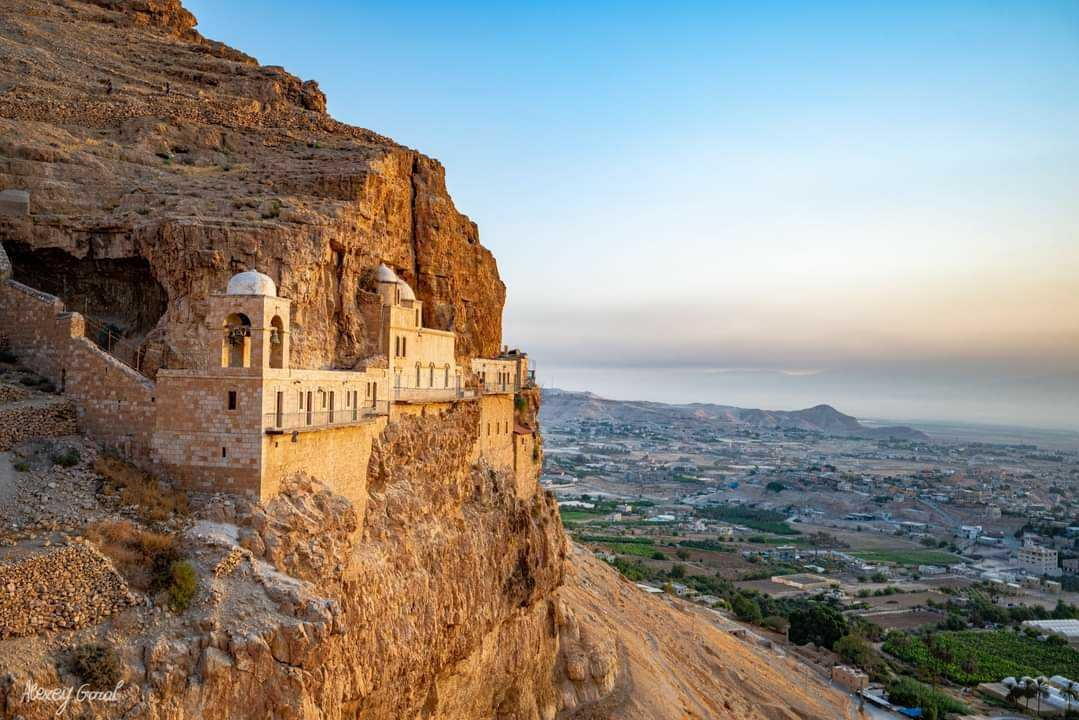
The Monastery of the Temptation on Jebel Quruntul, overlooking Jericho and the Dead Sea

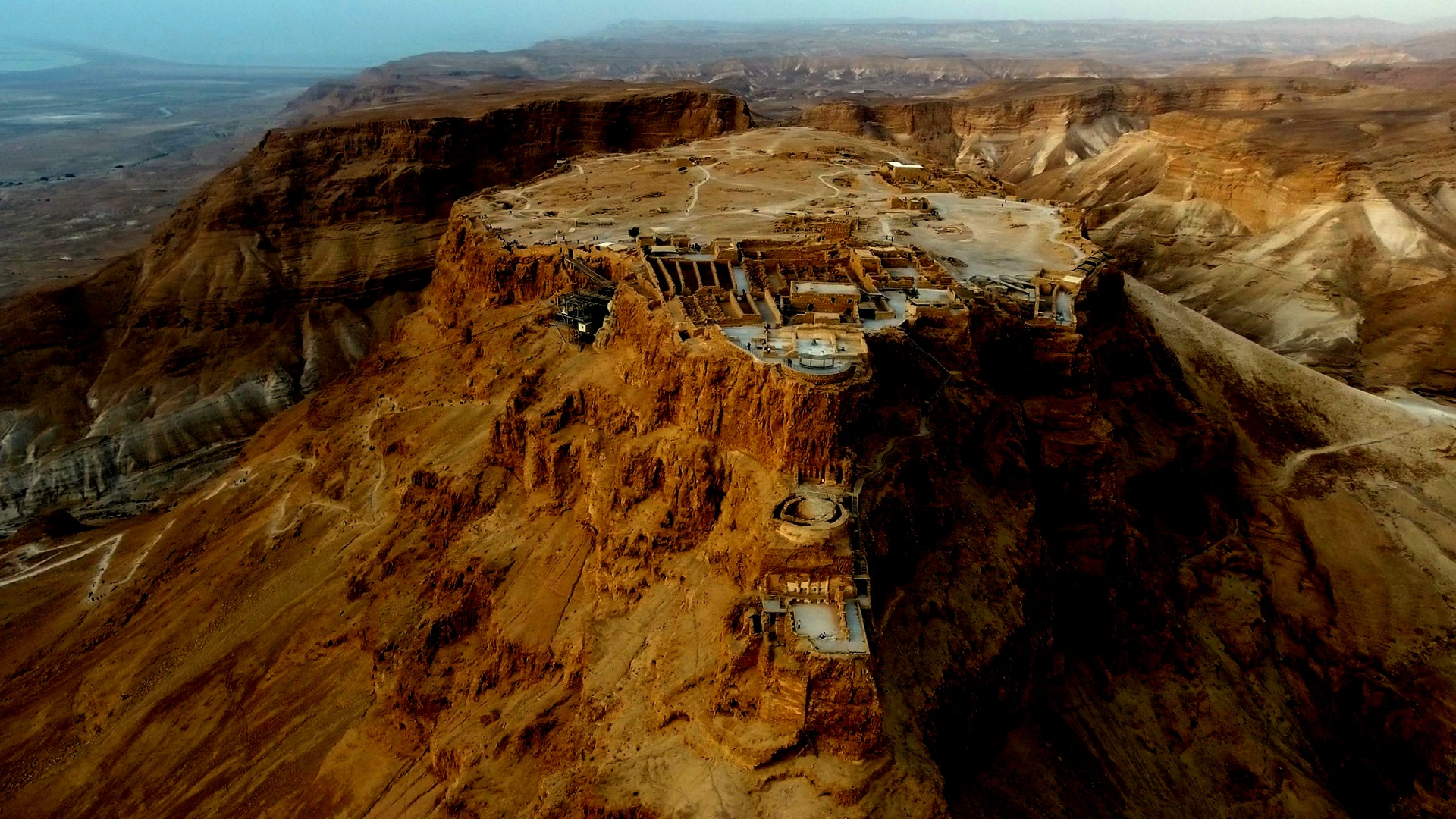
Masada, an ancient fortress, was the scene of a famous siege during the First Jewish-Roman War. The Roman siege ramp can be seen to the right.

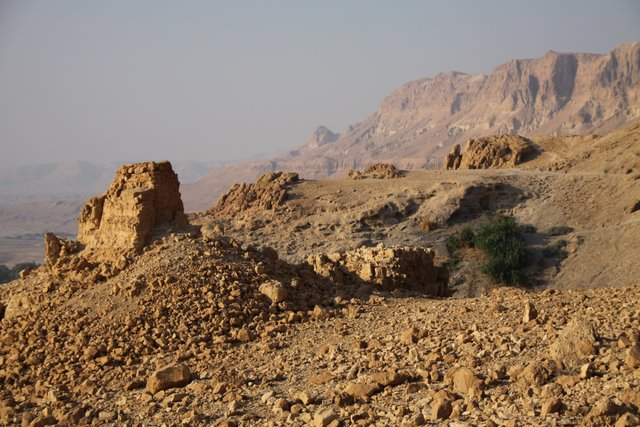
View of the Judaean Desert from Mount Yair, Ein Gedi

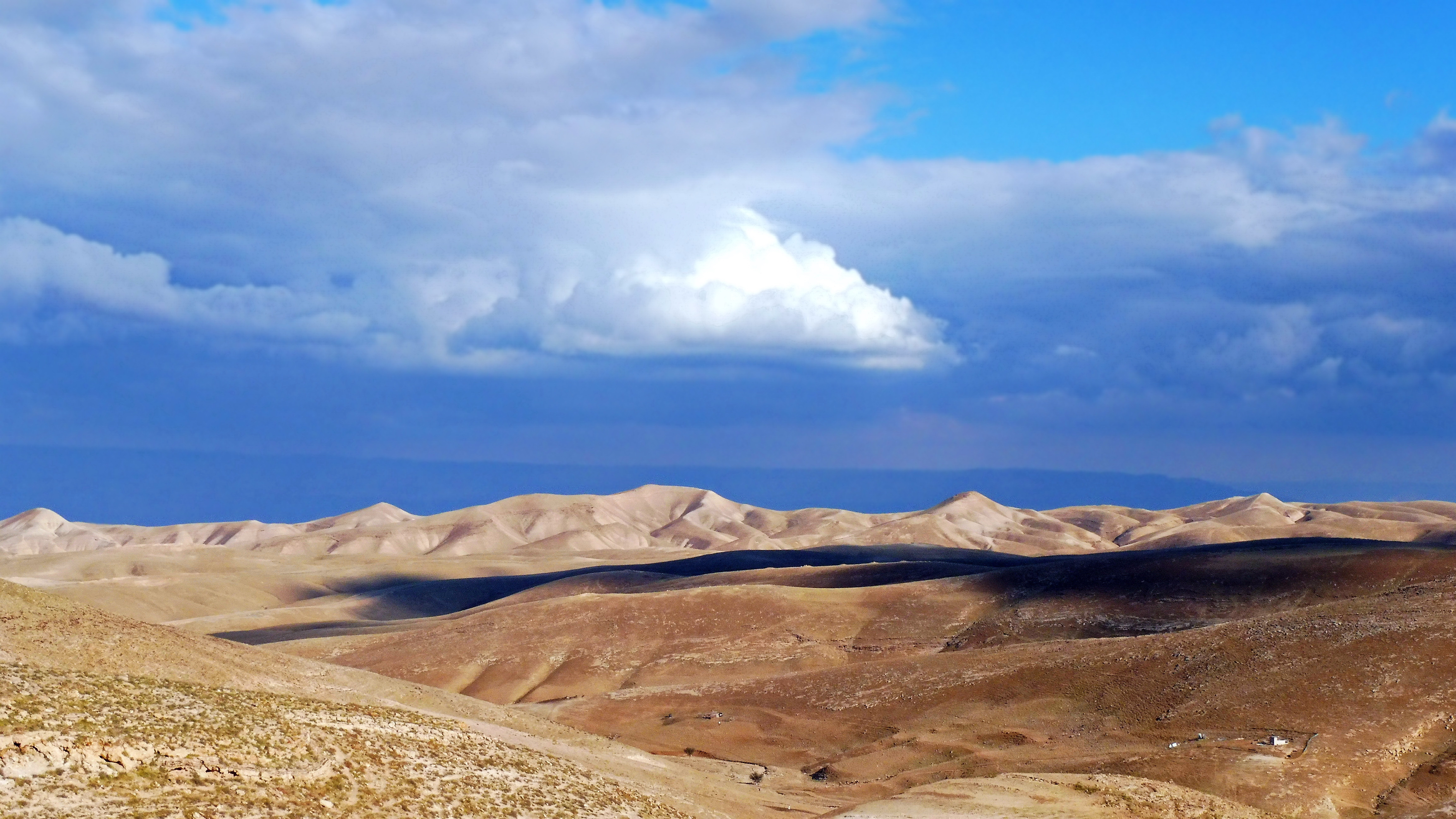
The Judaean Desert as seen from Ma'ale Adumim (suburb of Jerusalem)

== See also ==
- Archaeology of the Bar Kokhba Revolt
- Ein Gedi
- Geography of Israel
- Geography of Palestine
- Mar Saba
- Masada
- Judaean Mountains
- Mount of Temptation
- Qumran Caves
- Tourism in Israel
- Tourism in the Palestinian territories
