= Ein Gedi race =

Road running event in Israel

Ein Gedi race, also known as the Shalom Marathon – Dead Sea Half Marathon, is an Israeli road running event held by the Tamar Regional Council since 1983. The starting point for all races is the Ein Gedi Spa, 80 kilometers (50 mi) east of Jerusalem and 4 kilometers south of Kibbutz Ein Gedi. It is billed as the "lowest race on Earth".

== History ==
In 1997, the race was held in memory of Giora and Tomer Ron. The winner was Kenya's Bernard Boiya, with Morocco's Chaham el Matti coming in second.

In 1999, the Palestinian Authority flag flew at the race as a symbol of peace and brotherhood.

Since 2004, handcycling has grown in popularity at the race.

In 2010, three runners were airlifted to hospitals after suffering heatstroke during the race.

== See also ==
- Sports in Israel
