= Barsky Forest =

Coordinates: 53°34′11″N 56°19′25″E

Barsky Forest (Russian: лес Барский) is a forest in the northwestern part of Ishimbaysky District of Bashkortostan (Russia). It covers an area of 14 km^{2} and is located approximately 20 km from Sterlitamak and 20 km from Ishimbay.

The principal tree species in Barsky Forest are oak and lime.

== See also ==
- Akhmerovsky Forest
