= Shastovo, Sokolsky District, Vologda Oblast =

Shastovo Шастово
- Village
- Location within Vologda Oblast Location within Russia
- Coordinates: 59°23′N 40°07′E
- Country: Russia
- Region: Vologda Oblast
- District: Sokolsky District
- Time zone: UTC+3:00

Shastovo (Russian: Шастово) is a rural locality (a village) in Prigorodnoye Rural Settlement, Sokolsky District, Vologda Oblast, Russia. The population was 7 as of 2002.

== Geography ==
Shastovo is located 12 km south of Sokol (the district's administrative centre) by road. Stepanovo is the nearest rural locality.
