= Barskoye, Moscow Oblast =

Rural locality in Moscow Oblast, Russia

Coordinates: 55°37.43′N 38°51.85′E

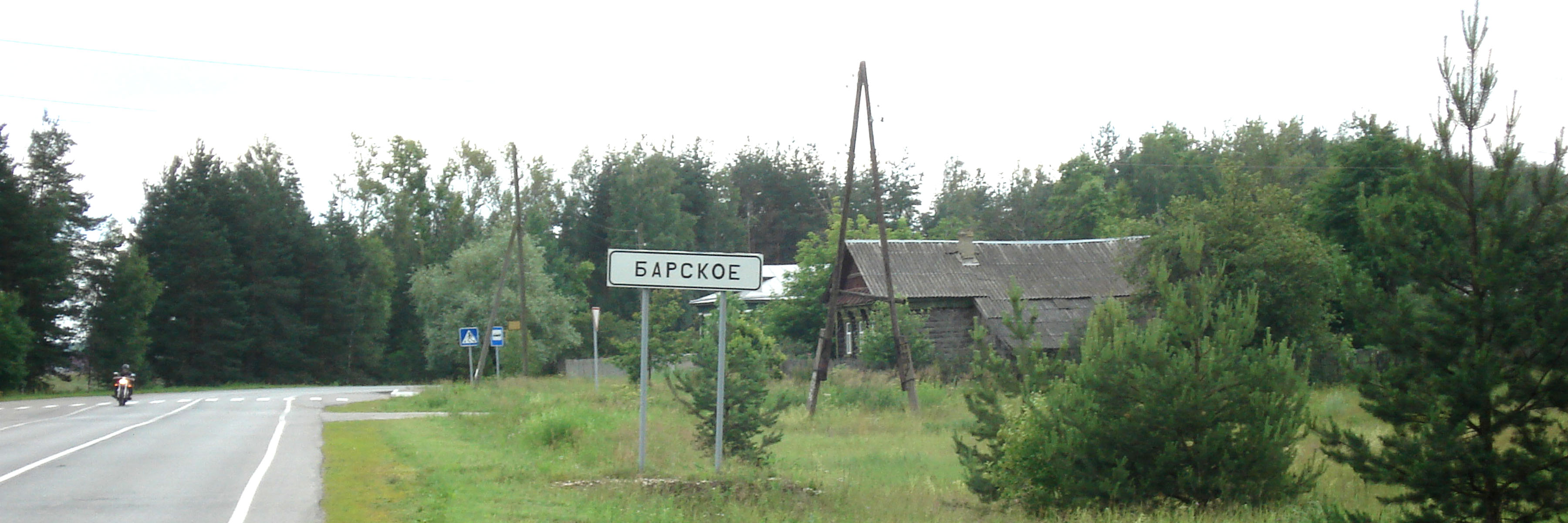
The village of Barskoye

Barskoye (Russian: Ба́рское) is a rural locality (a village) in Orekhovo-Zuyevsky District of Moscow Oblast, Russia, located some 75 kilometers (47 mi) southeast of Moscow.

Municipally, the village is a part of Davydovsky Rural Settlement (the administrative center of which is the village of Davydovo). Postal code: 142641.

== History ==
The village is located in the historical area of Zakhod (a part of Guslitsa). In the 19th century, it was called Barskaya (Ба́рская) and was a part of Zaponorskaya Volost of Bogorodsky Uyezd of Moscow Governorate. The overwhelming majority of the population of Barskoye were Old Believers, who from the end of the 19th century were guided by the Russian Orthodox Old-Rite Church.

== Population ==
In 1852, the village consisted of 34 homesteads comprising 198 inhabitants (95 male and 103 female). By 1925, the population grew to 68 homesteads comprising 274 inhabitants.
