= Medical tourism in Israel =

Travel to Israel for medical treatment

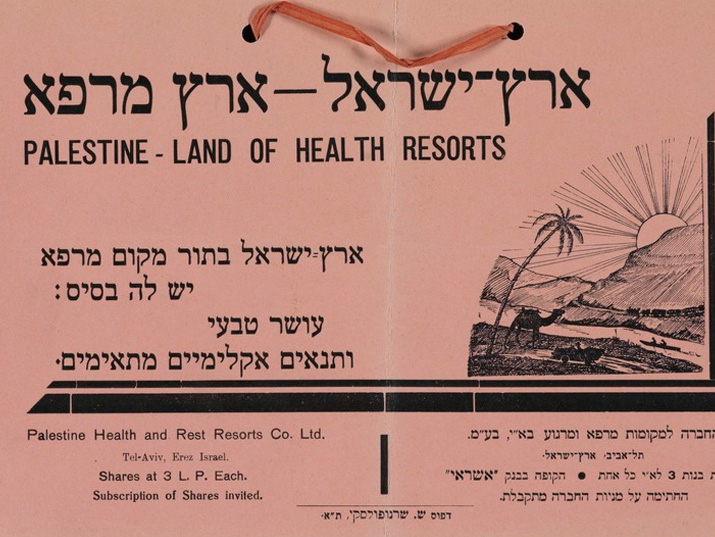
Poster promoting medical tourism in Mandatory Palestine

Israel is emerging as an important destination for medical tourists. In 2006, 15,000 people came to Israel for medical treatment, bringing in $40 million in revenue. In 2010, Israel treated 30,000 medical tourists. The Health Ministry estimates that they inject about NIS 200 million a year into the health system, of which more than NIS 100 million goes to government hospitals. Outside experts put the total much higher, at almost NIS 500 million.

According to a report in 2013, the number of people from Eastern Europe, Cyprus and the United States seeking treatment at Israel's public and private hospitals is growing. Income from medical tourism was assessed at about $140 million in 2012.

Israel is also frequently the host venue for international medical conferences.

== Overview ==
Medical tourists come to Israel for treatments such as surgery and in-vitro fertilization, which cost considerably less than in their home countries. Israel is the world leader in such procedures. Some seek relief for a variety of medical conditions at treatment centers and spas at the Dead Sea, a therapeutic resort. Many worldwide recognize the quality of Israel’s medical facilities, and they cooperate with medical and scientific research centers worldwide. Another factor in choosing Israel is the climate and scenic locations which have a calming effect on patients. People seeking a comfortable and sunny climate have been moving to Israel for years – even Zionist pioneer Eliezer ben Yehuda was driven to move to the area around Jerusalem in part for relief from his tuberculosis.

== Treatment options ==
Patients come to Israel for procedures such as bone marrow transplants, heart surgery and catheterization, oncological and neurological treatments, car accident rehabilitation, orthopedic procedures, and IVF treatment.

Israel has extensive medical cooperation with Cyprus in the field of kidney transplants.

== Lower costs ==
A patient with no health insurance who needs bypass surgery in the United States would spend between $120,000, while the same procedure performed in Israel would cost approximately $30,000. In vitro fertilization (IVF) is known for its high success rates and considerably lower costs. IVF costs $3,000 in Israel, compared to $20,000 in the United States.

== Dead Sea treatments ==
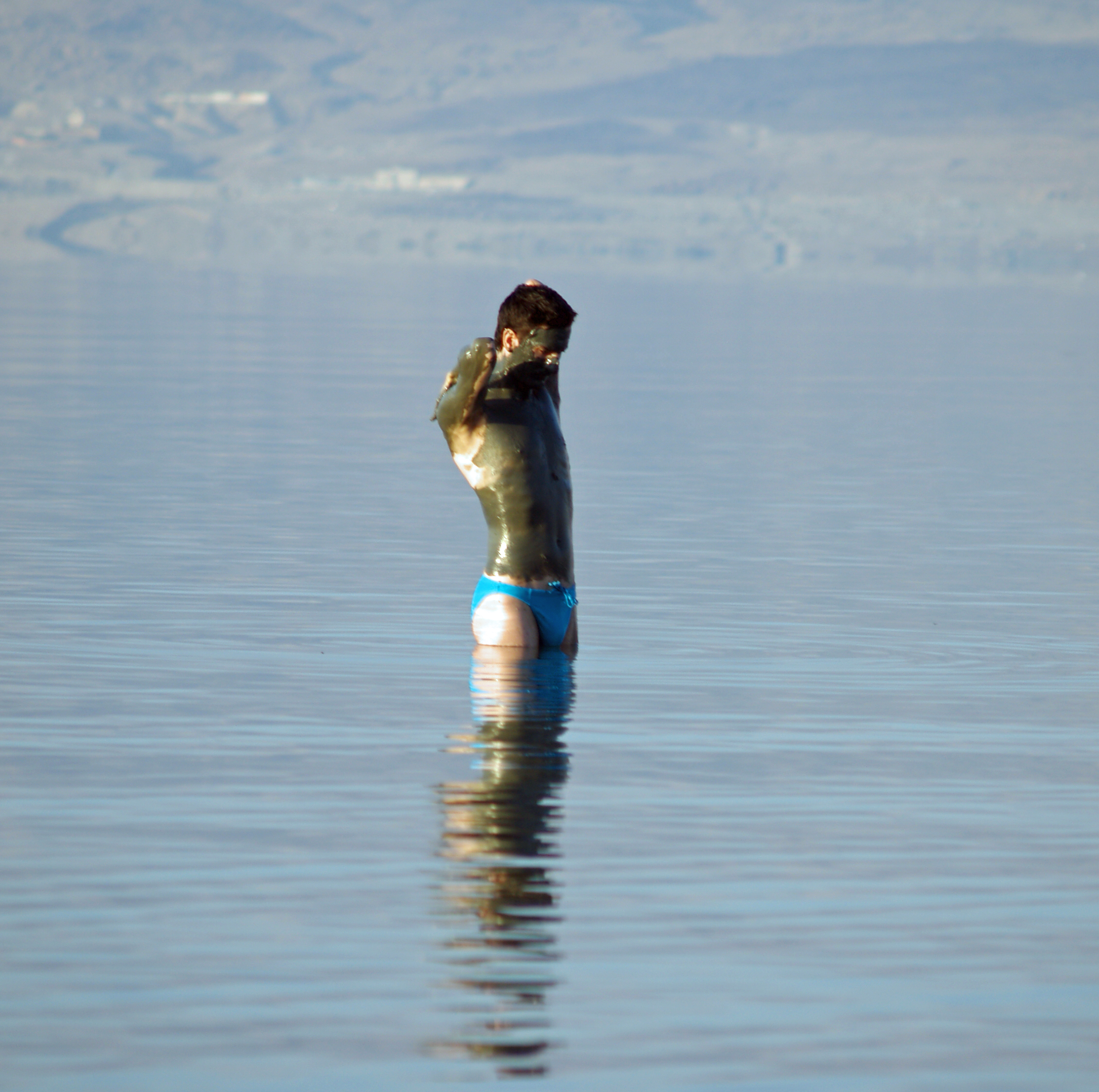
Mud bath at the Dead Sea

The Dead Sea area has become a major center for health research and treatment for several reasons. The mineral content of the water, the very low content of pollens and other allergens in the atmosphere, the reduced ultraviolet component of solar radiation, and the higher atmospheric pressure at this great depth each have specific health effects. For example, persons suffering reduced respiratory function from diseases such as cystic fibrosis seem to benefit from the increased atmospheric pressure.

Sufferers of the skin disorder psoriasis also benefit from the ability to sunbathe for long periods in the area due to its position below sea level and subsequent result that many of the sun's harmful UV rays are reduced.

The region's climate and low elevation have made it a popular center for several types of therapies:

- Climatotherapy: Treatment which exploits local climatic features such as temperature, humidity, sunshine, barometric pressure and special atmospheric constituents.
- Heliotherapy: Treatment that exploits the biological effects of the sun's radiation.
- Thalassotherapy: Treatment that exploits bathing in Dead Sea water.

Mud from the Dead Sea is believed to have therapeutic benefits for skin disorders and other physical ailments.

== Medical tourism brokers ==
The medical tourism industry in Israel has created a need for medical tourism brokers. Medical travel agents are required by Israeli law to register with the government.

== See also ==
- Tourism in Israel
- List of hospitals in Israel
- Health care in Israel
