= Ein Gedi Nature Reserve =

Nature reserve in the Judaean Desert, Israel

- עֵין גֶּדִי
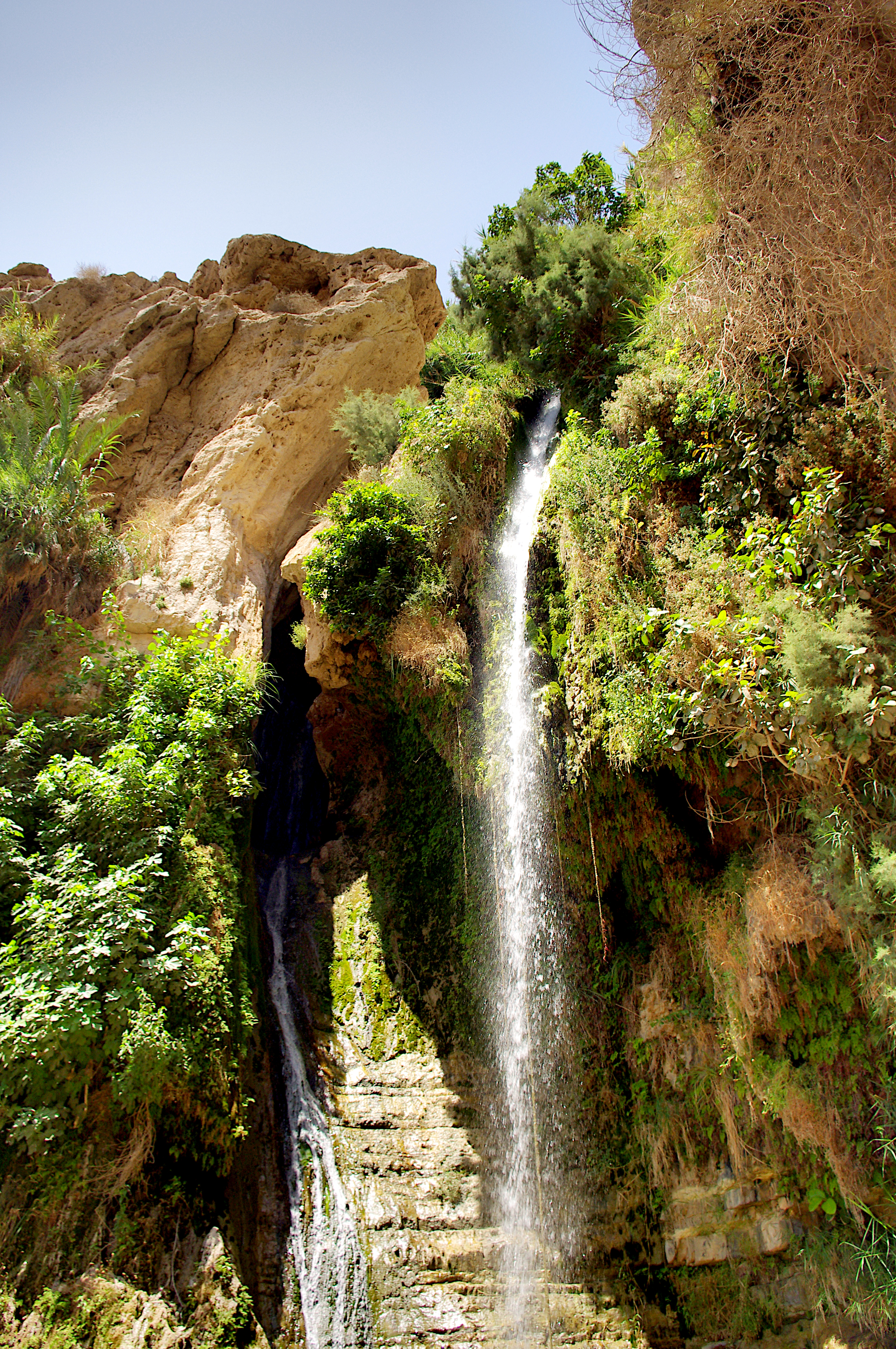
- The David Falls, Ein Gedi

- Location within Israel
- Location: Judean Desert, Israel
- Nearest city: Masada, Dead Sea
- Coordinates: 31°28′0″N 35°23′38″E
- Area: 14,000 dunams (1,400 ha)
- Established: 1971
- Governing body: Israel Nature and Parks Authority

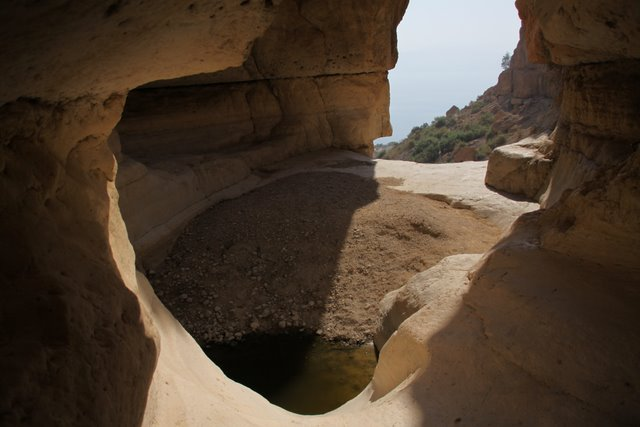
"The Window Dry Fall", overlooking Ein Gedi and the Dead Sea, Israel

Ein Gedi (Hebrew: עֵין גֶּדִי, romanized: ʿĒn Geḏi, Arabic: عين جدي, romanized: ʿAyn Gidī), also spelled En Gedi, meaning "spring of the kid", is an oasis and a nature reserve in Israel, located west of the Dead Sea, near Masada and the Qumran Caves. Ein Gedi is a popular tourist attraction and was listed in 2016 as one of the most popular nature sites in Israel. The site attracts about one million visitors a year.

Next to the reserve is the Ein Gedi Archaeological Park, which hosts the remains of the Roman and Byzantine-era Jewish settlement located nearby. Immediately to the south is modern Ein Gedi, a kibbutz (collective community) established in 1954.

== Etymology ==
The name Ein Gedi is composed of two words (In both Arabic and Hebrew): ein means spring or a fountain and gǝdi means goat-kid. Ein Gedi thus means "kid spring" or "fountain of the kid". The Hebrew name is also transliterated as 'En Gedi, En-gedi, Eggadi, Engaddi, and Engedi; the Arabic name as 'Ain Jidi and 'Ein Jidi. The archaeological mound (tell) is known in Hebrew as Tel Goren and in Arabic as Tell el-Jurn or Tell Jurn. The site has been identified with the biblical Hazazon Tamar (חַצְצוֹן תָּמָר ḥaṣṣōn tāmār, "portion [of land] of date palms"), on account of the palm groves which surrounded it. It is also written Hazazon-tamar, Hazazontamar, Hatzatzon-Tamar, Hazezon Tamar, and Hazezontamar.

== Overview ==
Ein Gedi Nature Reserve, declared at the end of 1971 and expanded in 1988, is one of the most important reserves in Israel. It is situated on the eastern slopes of the Judean Desert, bordering to the east on the Dead Sea, and covers an area of 14000 dunams (3,500 acres or 14 km^{2}).

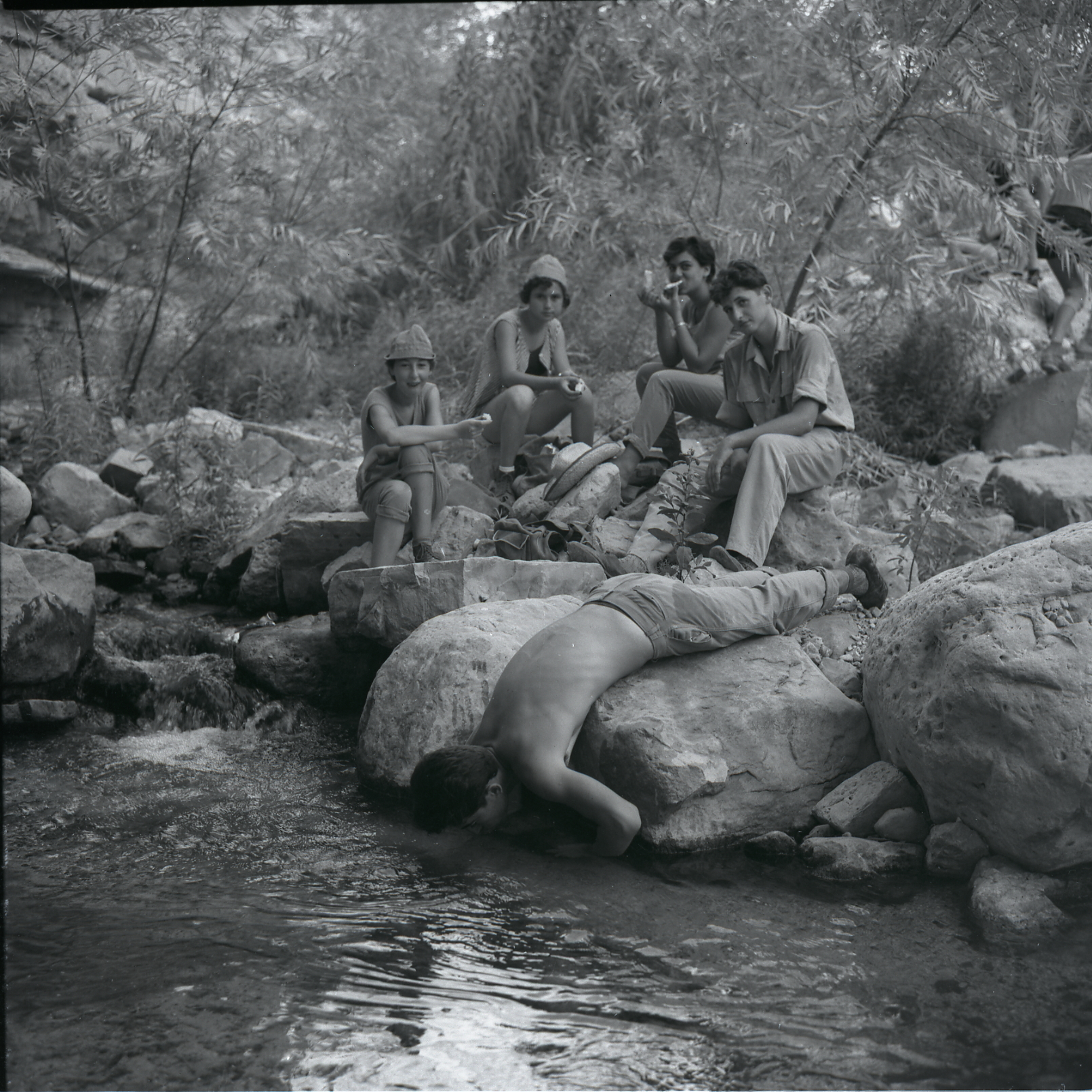
Travelers in Ein Gedi, 1963

The elevation ranges from the level of the Dead Sea at 423 meters (1,388 ft) below sea level, to the plateau of the Judean Desert at 200 meters above sea level. The nature reserve includes two streams flowing year-round and each fed by a perennial spring: Nahal David with Ein David ('David's Spring'), and Nahal Arugot with Ein Arugot ('Terraces Spring'). Two further springs, the Shulamit and Ein Gedi springs, also flow in the reserve. Together, the springs generate approximately three million cubic meters of water per year. Much of the water is used for agriculture or is bottled for consumption.

=== Flora and fauna ===
The reserve is a sanctuary for many types of plant, bird and animal species. The vegetation includes plants and trees from the tropical, desert, Mediterranean, and steppe regions, such as Sodom apple, acacia, jujube, and poplar. The many species of resident birds are supplemented by over 200 additional species during the migration periods in the spring and fall. Mammal species include the Nubian ibex and the rock hyrax.

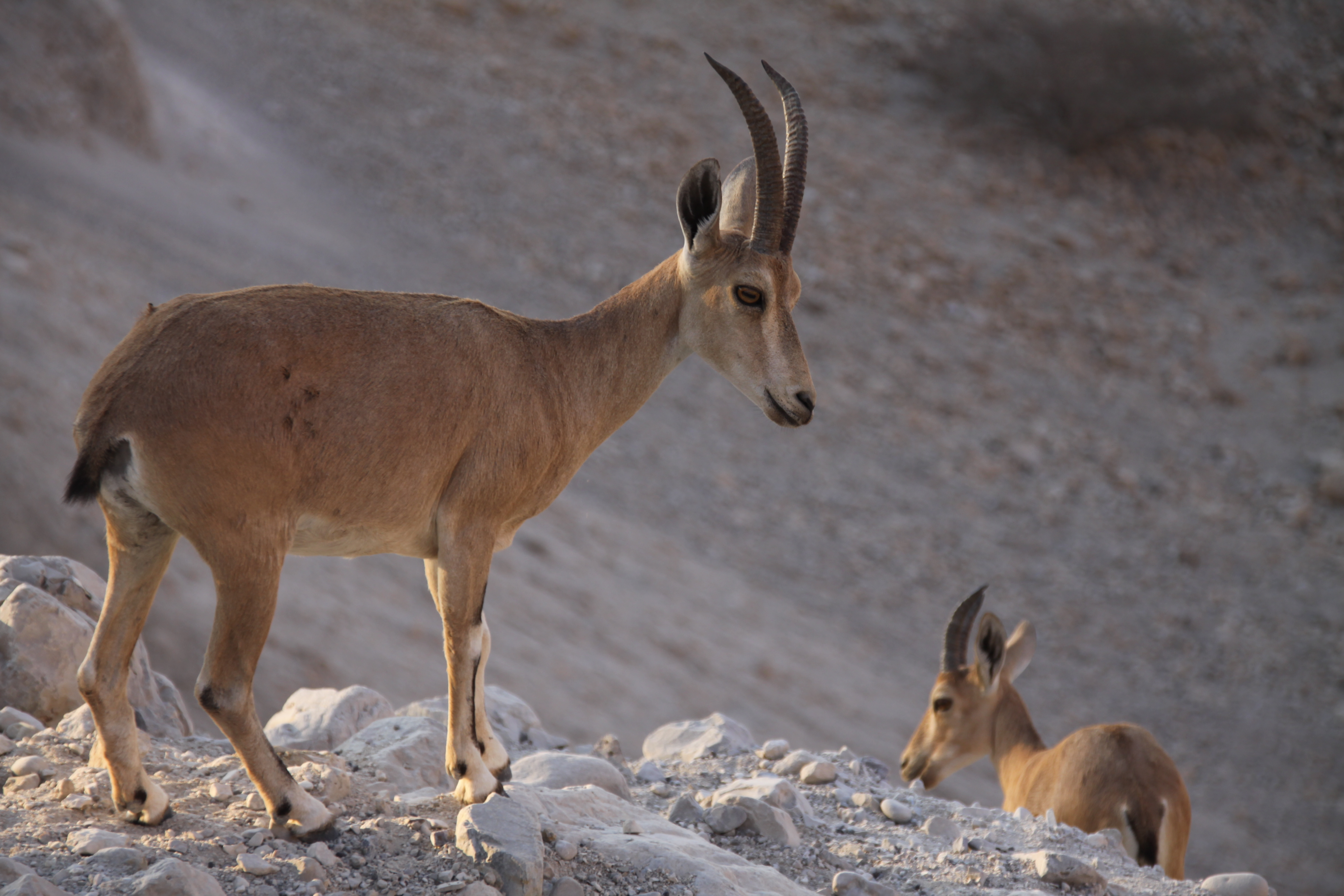
Two Nubian ibices at Ein Gedi Nature Reserve

=== Chalcolithic shrine and Iron Age remains ===
Ein Gedi Nature Reserve, administered separately from the Ein Gedi archaeology park (see above), features several archaeological sites including a rare Chalcolithic shrine, but also Tel Goren, an archaeological mound with Iron Age remains corresponding to Hazazon-tamar, a city mentioned in the Hebrew Bible and inhabited on and off till the Byzantine period, two water-powered flour mills from the Mamluk period, etc.

== Sinkholes ==
Ein Gedi has been subject to a large number of sinkholes appearing in the area, which have even damaged the highway built in 2010 which was supposedly built to a "sinkhole-proof" design. The sinkholes are due to the decline in the water level of the Dead Sea, as of 2021 at an annual rate of more than a metre, which is attributed to the battle for scarce water resources in the very arid region. The sinkholes form as a result of the receding shoreline (with the surface of the Sea having shrunk by about 33 per cent since the 1960s), where a thick layer of underground salt is left behind. When fresh water arrives in the form of heavy rains, it dissolves the salt as it sinks into the ground, forming an underground cavity, which eventually collapses under the weight of the surface ground layer.

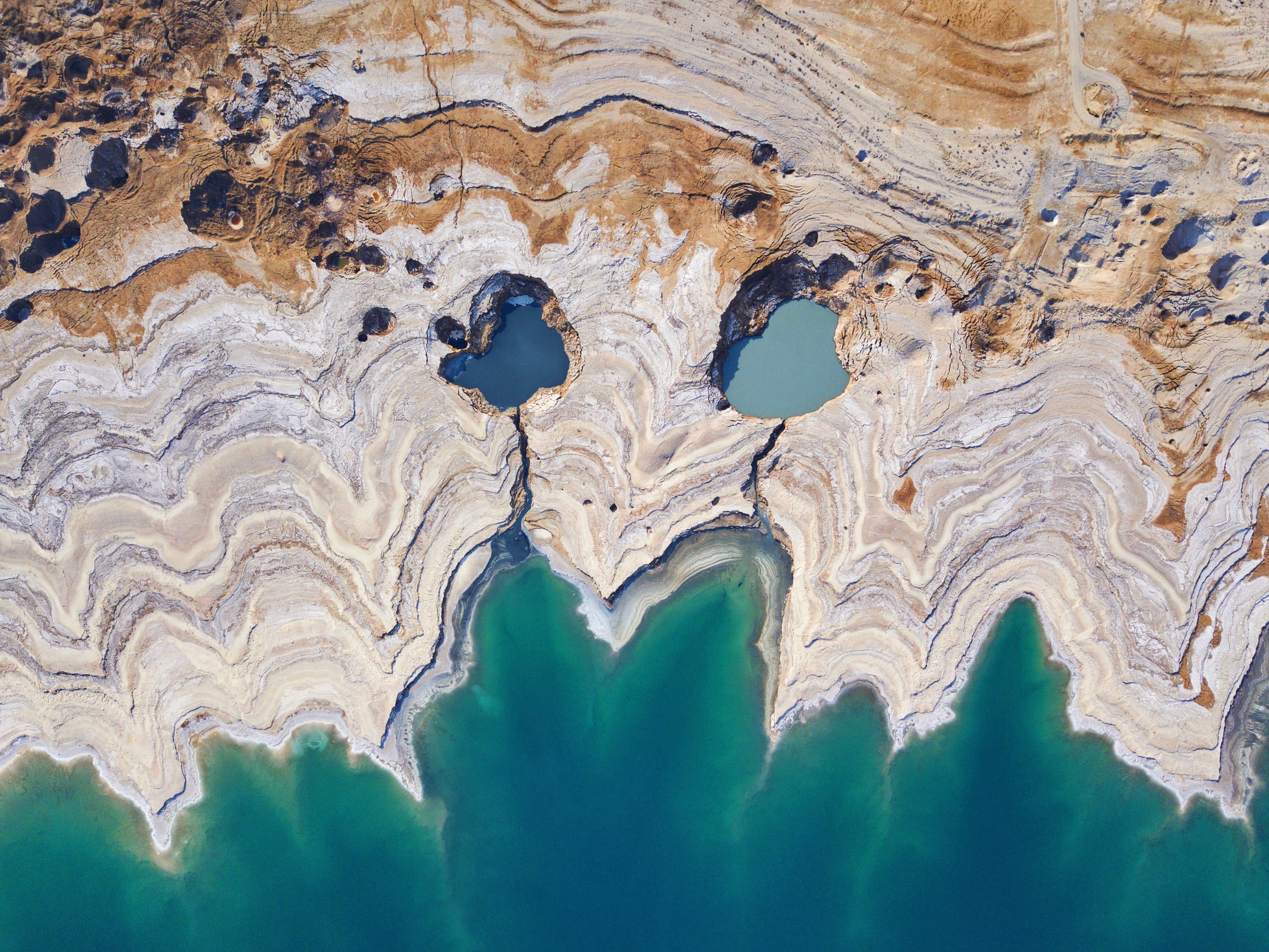
Aerial view of sinkholes in the reserve

Tourism has been affected by the receding shoreline and the sinkholes, and the amount of water from the rains reaching the sea has diminished since flash floods started pouring into the sinkholes. Huge cave systems called karsts convey water underground between the sinkholes. Scientists in the floodplain area south of Ein Gedi have been using cameras, water testing, videos using drones and satellite monitoring to map the area for safety.

== Nearby sites ==
=== Antiquities National Park ===
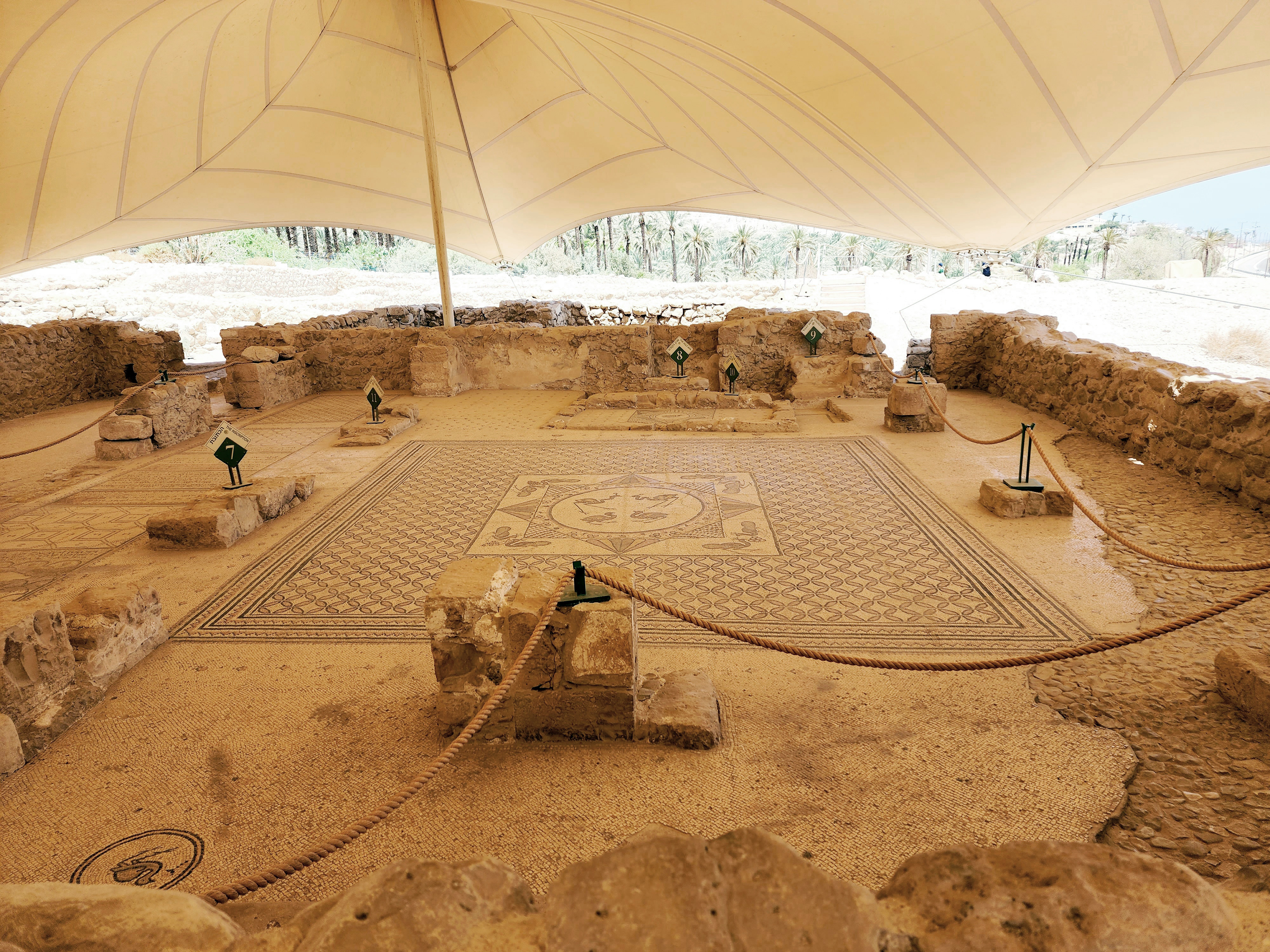
Ruins of the Ein Gedi synagogue, in the nearby Ein Gedi archaeological park

The Late Roman- and Byzantine-period synagogue and the village remains around it is run as a separate, archaeological park, distinct from the nature reserve and the antiquities contained therein. The Antiquities National Park centered on the synagogue was declared in 2002 and covers an area of 8 dunams (2.0 acres or 8,000 m^{2}).

A translation of the inscription from Aramaic on the floor is: "All the townspeople who gave their money to repair the synagogue are well remembered. Jonathan the cantor who gave his money to repair the synagogue is well remembered. Peace."

Iron Age remains dating to the 7th century BCE have been found at the site, when Ein Gedi was part of the kingdom of Judah. It is first mentioned in the Book of Joshua, written in the 7th century BCE. Later, the settlement is mentioned as the place where David fled from Saul. In Book of Chronicles 2, Ein Gedi is called Hazazon Tamar. The settlement was destroyed during the Babylonian exile. The Jewish settlement at the site was revived in the 5th century BCE and reached its peak during the Herodian period. It endured the Jewish–Roman wars and continued to exist as a smaller village until the 7th century CE, when it was ultimately destroyed by fire.

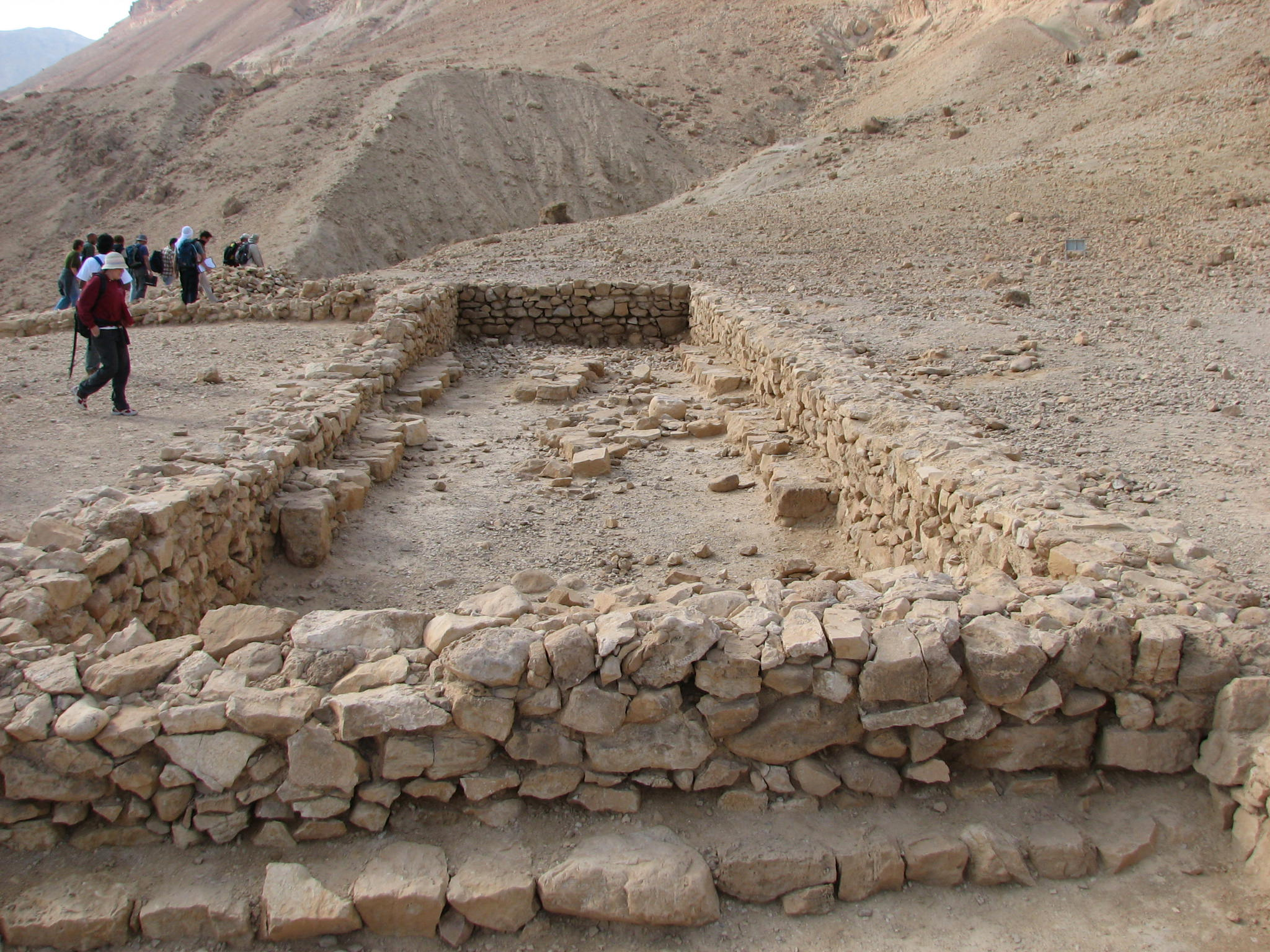
Archaeological remains of a Chalcolithic Temple south of Ein Gedi Nature Reserve.

The Chalcolithic temple - remains of an ancient temple near the Ein Gedi spring. The temple is attributed to the Chalcolithic period (more than 5,000 years ago) and it attracted believers from the surrounding area.

=== Modern village ===
Kibbutz Ein Gedi, founded in 1953, is located about a kilometer from the oasis. It offers various tourist attractions and takes advantage of the local weather patterns and the abundance of natural water to cultivate out-of-season produce. Part of the kibbutz's inhabited area is landscaped as an internationally acclaimed botanical garden, covering an area of 100 dunams (10 ha, 24.7 acres) and holding more than 900 species of plants from all over the world. It is the only populated botanical garden in the world. The kibbutz is also home to the Ein Gedi Eco Park, which functions as both a zoo and an environmental education center, demonstrating sustainable technologies such as solar cookers, greywater systems, mud buildings, and compost toilets.

== See also ==
- Ein Gedi (archaeological site)
- Cave of the Swords
- Hiking in Israel
- Tourism in Israel
- Wildlife of Israel

== Bibliography ==
- Conder, C.R; Kitchener, H.H. (1883). The Survey of Western Palestine: Memoirs of the Topography, Orography, Hydrography, and Archaeology. Vol. 3. London: Committee of the Palestine Exploration Fund. (pp. 384-386)
- Hirschfeld, Yizhar, ed. (2006). "Ein Gedi – A Very Large Village of Jews". Hecht Museum. Archived from the original on 2011-06-25.
- Negev, Avraham; Gibson, Shimon (2001). "En Gedi; Engeddi". Archaeological Encyclopedia of the Holy Land. New York & London: Continuum. pp. 161–164. ISBN 0826413161.
- Robinson, E.; Smith, E. (1841). Biblical Researches in Palestine, Mount Sinai and Arabia Petraea: A Journal of Travels in the year 1838. Vol. 2. Boston: Crocker & Brewster.
- Robinson, E.; Smith, E. (1841). Biblical Researches in Palestine, Mount Sinai and Arabia Petraea: A Journal of Travels in the year 1838. Vol. 3. Boston: Crocker & Brewster. (Robinson and Smith, 1841, vol 3, Appendix 2, p. 116)
- Palmer, E.H. (1881). The Survey of Western Palestine: Arabic and English Name Lists Collected During the Survey by Lieutenants Conder and Kitchener, R. E. Transliterated and Explained by E.H. Palmer. Committee of the Palestine Exploration Fund.
- Porath, Yosef (2021). "The Synagogue at En-Gedi". Qedem. 64: III–237. ISSN 0333-5844. JSTOR 27123172.
- Warren, C. (1869). "Remarks on a visit to 'Ain Jidy and the southern shores of the Dead Sea in mid-summer 1867". Quarterly Statement - Palestine Exploration Fund. 1: 143–150. (pp. 143-150)
