= Cave of the Swords =

Cave in the Judaean Desert in Israel

- Cave of the Hermit
- Location in Israel
- 31°28′40″N 35°23′46″E
- Type: Natural cave
- Periods: Iron Age Judah, Jewish–Roman wars
- Associated with: Jews
- Location: Ein Gedi Nature Reserve, South District, Israel
- Region: Judaean Desert

Site notes
- Archaeologists: Ofra Aharoni, Pessah Bar-Adon, Joseph Naveh, Yigal Tepper, Yotam Tepper, Asaf Gayer, Boaz Langford

Cave of the Swords, or Cave of the Hermit, is a small two-level cave in the Judaean Desert, situated on a stepped cliff above the Dead Sea, north of ancient Ein Gedi, in modern Israel. In 1973, a survey revealed a fragmentary Hebrew inscription painted on a stalactite. Paleographic analysis dated the text to the late 8th or early 7th century BCE, during the period of the Kingdom of Judah, and it has been interpreted as a blessing or prayer, possibly inscribed by a solitary individual in antiquity. In 2023, multispectral imaging was applied in an attempt to clarify the faded writing, leading to a new reading that may reference the biblical "Valley of Salt." The same imaging campaign also brought to light a second inscription, in Aramaic, likely dating to the 1st or 2nd century CE.

During the 2023 work, archaeologists discovered a hidden cache of Roman-period weaponry concealed in a deep, inaccessible crevice on the cave's upper level. The well-preserved assemblage included an iron pilum head and four swords identified as spathae of different types and a ring-pommel sword. Typological analysis places the arms in the 2nd century CE, and a Bar Kokhba coin found near the cave's entrance supports an association with the Bar Kokhba Revolt (132–136 CE). Scholars suggest the weapons were captured from Roman soldiers and hidden by Jewish rebels, possibly for reuse.

== Location and geography ==
The cave is located within the Ein Gedi Nature Reserve, on a stepped cliff west of the Dead Sea, 236 meters below sea level and about 150 meters above Highway 90, which runs along the shoreline. The ruins of the ancient town of Ein Gedi lie approximately 1.5 kilometers to the south.

The cave comprises two levels set one above the other, each with a wide entrance. The lower chamber is elongated and narrow, with an east-facing opening and relatively easy access from the north. A natural wall of tufa and stalactites partly divides its southern and northern sections, while a narrow vertical shaft near the northern end connects to the upper chamber. The upper level is smaller in size, with tufa deposits and other speleothems concentrated along its southern side.

== Archaeology ==
=== Paleo-Hebrew inscription (8th/7th century BCE) ===
A fragmentary Hebrew inscription was found in the southern section of the cave's upper level. It was written in ink on a tufa pillar positioned about one meter above the cave’s accumulation layer. The text consists of nine lines in Paleo-Hebrew script, with individual letters measuring between 7 and 20 millimeters.

Cursed be he who will efface
. . . . .] nh [. . . . . . .
. . .] yh [. . . . . . .
Blessed be YHW[. . . . .
. . . ]wb [. . . . . .
Blessed be BGY[. . . . ] king
Blessed be 'DNY[. . . .
. . . . . . . . . .
. . . . . . . . .

Paleographic analysis by archaeologist Pessah Bar-Adon, with the assistance of paleographer and epigraphist Joseph Naveh, dated the inscription to the late 8th or early 7th century BCE, during the period of the Kingdom of Judah. The text has been interpreted broadly as a blessing, a supplication, or a prayer addressed to God. Bar-Adon proposed that it may have been inscribed by a refugee or hermit, offering praise to God while looking out over the landscape visible from the cave's upper entrance.

In 2019, archaeologists Yigal Tepper and Yotam Tepper suggested that the inscription might have been made during the Roman period, possibly in the Bar Kokhba Revolt, by Jews sheltering in the cave. They noted that while the script is Iron Age in style, the names and phrases align more with the Second Temple period, implying it was written by someone literate in ancient Hebrew who upheld long-standing religious and national traditions.

In 2023, multispectral imaging was used in an effort to clarify the inscription's faded text. Archaeologist Asaf Gayer reported that the clearer images revealed the letters bet, gimel, and yodh following the word "Blessed," along with a First Temple period word-divider. He interpreted this as the phrase "in the valley," written in a biblical variant spelling, followed by partially preserved letters he read as "the salt." This reading may refer to the "Valley of Salt" known from several biblical passages, including 2 Samuel 8:13 and Psalm 60:2, both linked to King David's victories in a location near the Dead Sea. Gayer suggested the text could express thanks for survival in the harsh desert environment.

=== Aramaic inscription (1st or 2nd century CE) ===
In 2023, an Aramaic inscription was discovered on the lower part of the same stalactite that bears the earlier Hebrew text. Measuring about 8 by 3.5 centimeters, it consists of four lines in square Hebrew script. The first line reads, "Abba of Naburya has perished" — with Abba attested as a common name in the first centuries CE in sources such as the Mishnah, and Naburya known as a Jewish village near Safed. Only a few words or letters from the remaining lines have been identified, among them "on us," "he took," and "the."

The inscription's letter forms combine semi-formal and cursive elements, possibly reflecting the difficulty of writing on the stalactite's surface or the writer's limited training. Based on language and script, it is thought to date to the 1st or 2nd century CE. Its position, close to the swords and a Bar Kokhba coin, suggests it may belong to the time of the Bar Kokhba Revolt, though the First Jewish Revolt or the intervening period remain possibilities. While both inscriptions appear on the same stalactite, the researchers believe they are unrelated.

=== Roman weaponry (2nd century CE) ===
In 2023, archaeologists uncovered a hidden cache of Roman weaponry, including a pilum (javelin) head and four iron swords, three of them still preserved in wooden scabbards with metal and leather fittings. The typology of the swords suggests a 2nd-century CE context. A bronze Bar Kokhba coin inscribed "for the freedom of Jerusalem," found at the cave's entrance, supports dating the cache to the revolt. The hidden state of the specimen suggest they were likely captured from Roman soldiers and hidden by Jewish rebels for future use. According to archaeologist Simon James, these swords are among "the best preserved Roman swords with scabbards that have ever been found."

The iron pilum head was found concealed deep in an inaccessible crevice in the cave; it is an example of the socketed type, measuring 29.5 cm in total length. It consists of a long, square-sectioned point and a round-sectioned socket, with traces of its original wooden shaft still preserved inside, once secured by a transverse nail. Comparable socketed pila heads have been recovered from several other Bar Kokhba period contexts, including Te'omim Cave, Betar, Naḥal Yattir, and Wadi Murabba'at.

Three Roman spathae were recovered from the cave, all preserved in their wooden scabbards. One, identified as a Pompeii-type sword of the late 1st–early 2nd century CE, has a 63 cm parallel-edged blade with a short triangular point, a wooden hilt with a hemispherical guard and elliptical pommel, and traces of rope wrapping for grip adjustment. A second, similar in blade and hilt form but still sheathed, features a copper-alloy scabbard chape of a type adopted by the Roman army after the Dacian Wars (101–106 CE); a similar sword was found at Dura Europos. The third, likely of the Fontillet type, has a 67 cm tapered blade, a wooden hilt and pommel, and leather covering adapted for improved handling.

A short Roman sword of the ring-pommel type (Biborski Type II) was also found in the cave, preserved in matching wooden scabbard plates with a leather chape. The iron blade, still sheathed, is parallel-edged and estimated at 45 cm in length. The hilt, 15 cm long, consists of an iron tang bent to form a loop, into which an iron ring with a rhomboid cross-section was set as the pommel. The metal handguard is rectangular in outline, while the original grip covering has not survived. This sword type is also thought to have entered Roman use after the Dacian Wars, and to have disappeared by the early 3rd century. The example from the cave represents the first and earliest appearance of the type in the region.

== Research history ==
In 1973, Ofra Aharoni of the Ein Gedi Field School identified the Hebrew inscription during a visit to the cave. The following year, in March 1974, Pessah Bar-Adon carried out an archaeological excavation on behalf of the Hebrew University of Jerusalem and the Israel Exploration Society.

Between 2002 and 2004, the Israel Cave Research Center at the Hebrew University of Jerusalem carried out a survey and mapping of the cave, concentrating on its physical structure and environmental conditions.

In February 2022, a survey of the cave, designated Y1-001, was undertaken by the Israel Antiquities Authority (IAA) as part of its Judean Desert Caves Survey. On the lower level, the team documented finds from multiple periods, including pottery from the Chalcolithic and Roman eras, shells, glass fragments, and an iron arrowhead with a leaf-shaped blade. Arrowheads of this type are known from other Judaean Desert sites associated with the Bar Kokhba Revolt.

In May 2023, archaeologist Asaf Gayer (Ariel University) visited the cave with geologist Boaz Langford (Hebrew University of Jerusalem), Israel Antiquities Authority photographer Shai Halevi, and Gilad Marder of the IAA Judaean Desert Caves Survey. The team's primary aim was to document the pillar inscription using multispectral imaging to detect features invisible to the naked eye. While examining the upper level, Gayer discovered the pilum head and informed the IAA survey team, who then carried out a systematic inspection of the cave's niches and crevices, leading to the discovery of the four swords. In December 2023, National Geographic ranked the discovery among the most exciting archaeological finds of the year.

== See also ==
- Bar Kokhba refuge caves
- Cave of Horrors
- Cave of Letters
- Nahal Hever
- Wadi Muraba'at

== Bibliography ==
- Bar-Adon, Pesach (1975a). "An Early Hebrew Graffito in a Judaean Desert Cave". Eretz-Israel (in Hebrew). 12: 77–80.
- Bar-Adon, Pesach (1975b). "An Early Hebrew Inscription in a Judean Desert Cave". Israel Exploration Journal. 25: 226–232.
- Bar-Adon, Pesach (1975c). "A Hebrew Inscription of the Monarchy Period from the Judaean Desert". Qadmoniot (in Hebrew). 29: 21–23.
- Borschel-Dan, Amanda (2023-09-06). "Redeciphered First Temple inscription may shed light on biblical 'Valley of Salt'". The Times of Israel. ISSN 0040-7909.
- Klein, Eitan; Gayer, Asaf; Ganor, Amir; Hamer, Hagay (2023). "Preliminary Insights following the Recovery of a Cache of Roman-Period Weaponry from the Cave of the Swords". New Studies in the Archaeology of the Judean Desert: Collected Papers: 453–479. doi:10.2307/jj.10329820.22. ISBN 978-965-406-774-4. JSTOR jj.10329820.22.
- Metcalfe, Tom (2023-12-06). "7 of the most exciting archaeological discoveries in 2023". National Geographic.
- Romey, Kristin (2023-09-06). "These Roman swords were hidden in a Dead Sea cave—and they're remarkably well preserved". National Geographic.
- Tepper, Yigal; Tepper, Yotam (2019). "Concealed Inscriptions and Images in Refuge Caves and Hiding Complexes in the Judean Shephelah and Desert". In Peleg-Barkat, Orit; Ashkenazi, Jonathan; Leibner, Uzi; Aviam, Mordechai; Talgam, Rina (eds.). Between Sea and Desert: On Kings, Nomads, Cities and Monks: Essays in Honor of Joseph Patrich. Land of Galilee 5 (in Hebrew). Ẓemaḥ. pp. 171–180.
- Tercatin, Rossella (2025-08-07). "'Abba of Naburya has perished': Unique 1,900-year-old inscription found in Dead Sea cave". The Times of Israel. ISSN 0040-7909.
