= Bar Kokhba refuge caves =

Natural caves used as sanctuaries by Jewish refugees

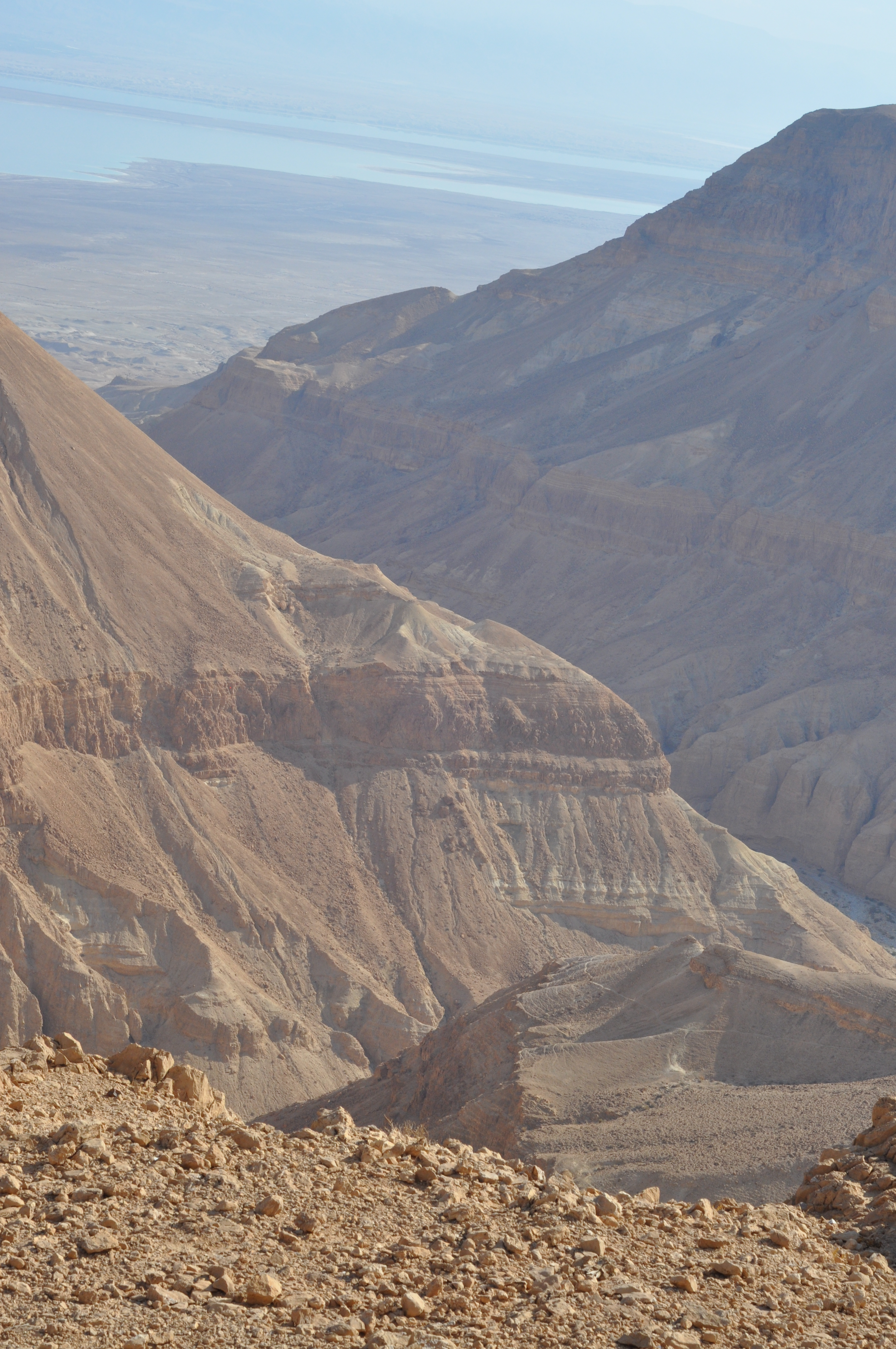
A view of Nahal Hever, a riverbed near the southern Dead Sea, where refuge caves such as the Cave of Horrors and Cave of Letters were discovered

The Bar Kokhba refuge caves are natural caves that were used for shelter by Jewish refugees during the later phases of the Bar Kokhba revolt. Most of the refuge caves were located in the Judaean Desert, nestled within steep cliffs far away from settlements, many overlooking the Dead Sea and the Jordan Valley. Some were also found in ravines flowing into the Dead Sea, while others were nestled within the Judaean Mountains. Unlike the other two hideout systems used by the rebels, the man-made rock-cut hiding complexes, and the hard-to-reach cliff shelters which often contain hewn installations, the refuge caves remained largely untouched by human intervention.

Jews taking shelter in refuge caves aimed to escape the Roman army during its suppression of the revolt. These caves are thought to have offered sanctuary to those in the eastern Judaean Mountains and the Jordan Valley. Some caves show signs of successful refuge, while others contain skeletal remains of adults and children, indicating deaths due to starvation, thirst, or encounters with Roman forces, as evidenced by the construction of siege camps and the discovery of arrowheads embedded in cave ceilings.

Refuge caves such as the Cave of Letters and Cave of Horrors in Nahal Hever, as well as those within Wadi Murabba'at, have yielded many notable archaeological artifacts. These include fragments of Biblical scrolls, documents inscribed in Aramaic and Greek, a variety of weaponry—both locally produced and plundered from the Romans—and coins minted by the Bar Kokhba administration. Moreover, these caves have served as time capsules, preserving household items and valuable objects such as metalwork, pottery, glassware, jewelry, textiles, sandals and keys. These artifacts provide valuable insights into daily life during this tumultuous period, illuminating the experiences of refugees who were prepared for an uncertain future and hopeful for a return to their homes. Among the finds are letters authored by Simon bar Kokhba himself, offering a direct glimpse into the leadership and administration of the revolt.

== Older refuge caves ==
Caves were used for refuge throughout history in the region. Up the southern slope of the Masada cliff, the almost inaccessible Yoram Cave, whose only opening is located some 4 metres (13 ft) above an exposed access path and 100 metres (330 ft) below the plateau, has been found to contain 6,000-year-old barley seeds. Researchers believe that it was a place of short-term refuge for Chalcolithic people fleeing an unknown catastrophe and carrying with them the grain into the desert, the closest place where the barley could have been grown being at least 20 kilometers (12 miles) away.

A refuge cave from Western Galilee, the Kamon Cave, was found to hold large storage jars as well as valuables, placed there at the end of the 4th century BCE during the Diadochi Wars, which wrought havoc in the region including the destruction of nearby Acre.

== Regions ==
=== Judaean Desert ===
Over 30 refuge caves have been discovered in the Judaean Desert. These caves are believed to have provided sanctuary for Jewish refugees fleeing from their homes in the eastern Judean Mountains and the Jordan Valley, mainly originated from nearby areas such as Ein Gedi along the western shore of the Dead Sea, villages in the southern Hebron region, and northern locations like Herodium, Jerusalem, and Jericho. Epigraphic evidence suggests that some refugees even came from farther east of the Dead Sea. Eshel and Amit proposed that caves near settlements were used by ordinary people, while leaders of communities and high officials of the Bar Kokhba administration sought refuge in more remote caves that were harder to access.

Refugees from Ein Gedi dispersed among multiple sites: small groups fled to the Har Yishai Cave and the Cave of the Pool in Naḥal David, while larger groups sought refuge in Naḥal Ḥever, which would later yield some of the most significant archaeological discoveries. Caves north of Ein Gedi such as Salvadora, the Cave of the Figs, and the Cave of the Spears also likely received residents from the area. Refugees from the Jericho area fled to the caves of Ketef Jericho, while people from Archelais or Phasaelis, and possibly from the toparchy of Aqraba, escaped to Wadi er-Rashash and 'Araq en-Na'asaneh in Wadi Daliyeh. Refugees from the Herodium area likely sheltered in the el-Masia Cave or Wadi Murabba'at, while those from the southern Hebron Hills appear to have reached the Cave of the Tetradrachm in Naḥal Ḥever, as well as caves in Naḥal Ze'elim and Naḥal Harduf.

=== Samaria and Galilee ===
Until recently, the vast majority of the hideout systems datable to the Bar Kokhba revolt (hiding complexes, cliff shelters, and refuge caves) were documented in what in biblical terms is known as the territory of Judah. More recently, such caves were discovered north of it, in Benjamin and Samaria. In Galilee, however, only the first two types of hideouts are known with certainty, with no refuge caves reported or published until 2018. At that point however, from among the 136 caves surveyed in the Meiron Valley area of Upper Galilee, three or possibly four have yielded some pottery most likely dating from the 2nd-4th centuries (Late Roman period). Due to the scarcity of the findings, researchers are not yet able to identify the population which hid in the caves, or the historical events which forced them to hide underground. What these three caves have in common is that they are only accessible with the help of ropes, are not suitable for long-term habitation, and contain no installations. Research needs to be continued.

== Notable caves ==
- Wadi Murabba'at, also known as Nahal Darga, is a ravine located in the northern Judaean Desert. It houses three karstic caves that served as refuges during the Bar Kokhba revolt. Excavated in 1952 by Gerald Lankester Harding and Roland de Vaux, the caves yielded textiles, basketry, ropes, and fragments of leather and papyrus inscribed in Aramaic, Hebrew, and Greek. Among the discoveries were biblical texts, a marriage contract, and letters sent by Simon bar Kokhba. A Minor Prophets scroll was found in a small crevice there by a Bedouin a few years later, in 1955.

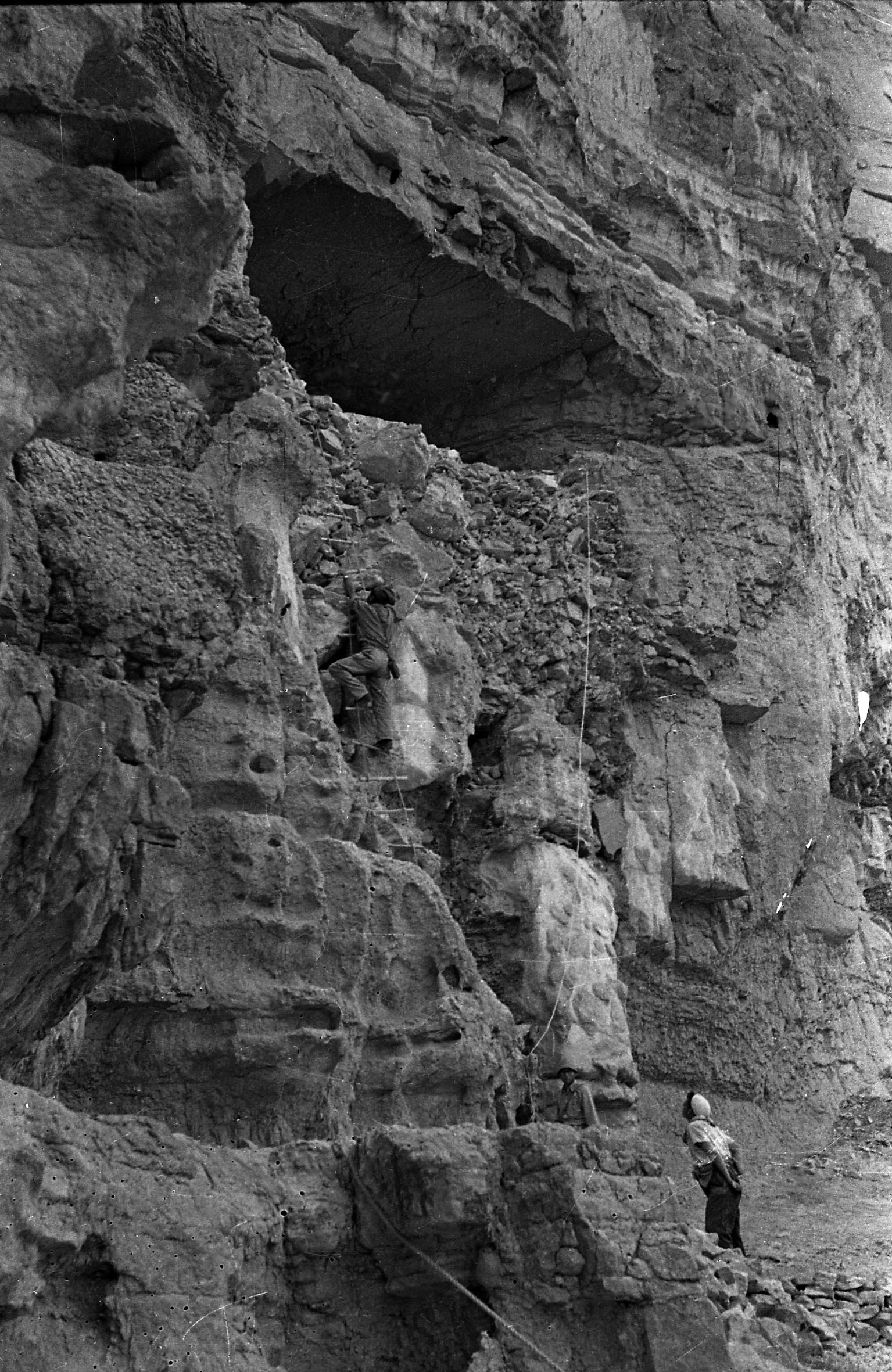
The Cave of Letters, where letters sent from Simon bar Kokhba to the people of Ein Gedi were discovered

- The Cave of Letters is located in the northern cliff of Nahal Hever in the Judaean Desert. In 1960, artifacts dating back to the Bar Kokhba revolt were discovered here by Yigael Yadin. Among the findings were a collection of letters in Hebrew and Aramaic written by Simon bar Kokhba to the leaders of Ein Gedi, namely, Yehonatan ben Be'ayah and Masabala ben Shimon and two of the revolt's most significant archives: that of Babatha, a Jewish woman whose 35 documents suggest she fled with hopes of survival but likely died in the cave, and that of Salome Komaise, comprising 17 documents. Together, they document property sales, marriage contracts, gifts, and legal disputes, shedding light on women's rights in this milieu.
- Situated on the southern flank of Nahal Hever, near the Dead Sea, the Cave of Horrors earned its name from discoveries made during excavations in 1955. Among these were the skeletons of multiple women and children, alongside everyday objects and remnants of food. Subsequent excavations revolt coinage, Hebrew ostraca bearing personal names, and manuscript fragments in Hebrew and Greek, including portions of the Minor Prophets. Arrowheads embedded in the cave's ceiling provide evidence of Roman attacks on the refugees.
- Cave of the Swords (also known as the "Cave of the Hermit") – Located approximately 1 km north of ancient Ein Gedi, this small cave is also notable for earlier Paleo-Hebrew graffiti dating to the First Temple period (possibly 8th or 7th century BCE). In 2023, archaeologists uncovered a concealed cache of Roman military equipment, including a pilum head and four iron swords—three of which were remarkably preserved in wooden scabbards with metal and leather fittings. The assemblage included Pompeii-type spathae and a ring-pommel sword, typologically dating to the 2nd century CE. A bronze Bar Kokhba coin inscribed "for the freedom of Jerusalem," discovered at the cave's entrance, supports attribution of the cache to the Bar Kokhba revolt. Scholars suggest the weapons were likely seized from Roman forces and hidden by Jewish rebels for future use.

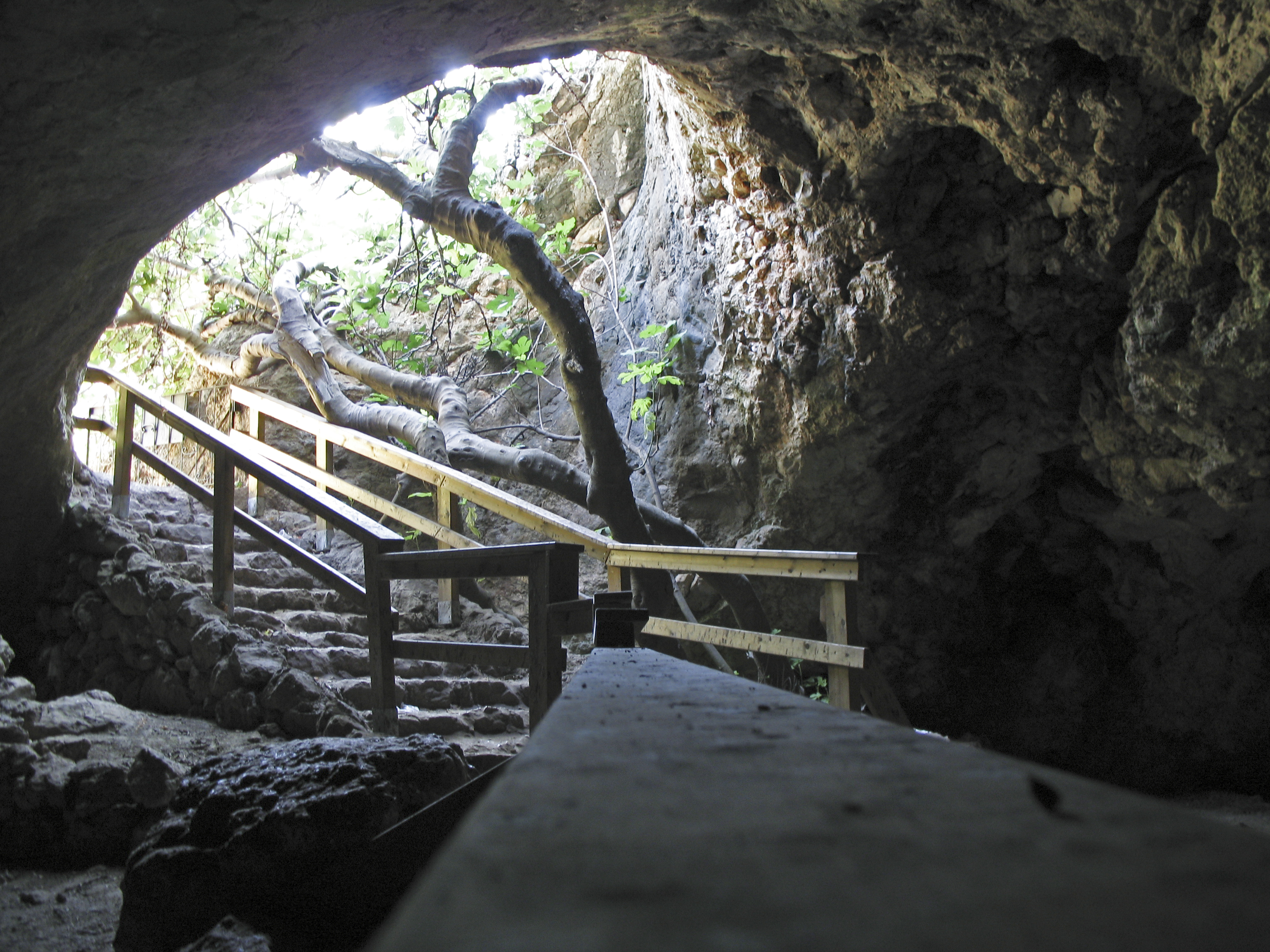
Entrance to the Te'omim cave, near Beit Shemesh, where hoards of coins, skeletons and two concealed weapons were found

- The Te'omim Cave, also known as the Twins Cave, is situated in the western Jerusalem Mountains near Beit Shemesh. It stands out as one of the earliest refuge caves discovered outside the Judaean Desert; instead, it was found in the Judean Mountains—a epicenter of the Bar Kokhba revolt. Excavations uncovered skeletal remains of rebels, alongside three hoards of coins, notably containing a substantial number of Bar Kokhba coins likely from three distinct families. Additionally, two weapons, including a locally made spear, were found, concealed yet readily available for immediate use.
- The El-Jai cave is a karstic cave located in Nahal Michmas/Wadi es-Suweinit, a stream in the northern Judaean Desert. In 1997, Eshel and Zissu found 16 coins there, including four minted by the Bar Kokhba administration.
- The 'Aboud Cave, situated in the western Benjamin Hills near the modern village of 'Aboud, within the eastern-central region of the West Bank. Explored by Boaz Zissu, Boaz Langford, and Amos Frumkin, the site yielded artifacts such as oil lamps, metalwork, glassware, and Bar Kokhba coinage.
- The Tur Saffa cave is located in the western Hebron Hills near Tarqumiyah and is one of the largest caves in the western highlands of the Southern Levant. Among the few potsherds found, several date to the Chalcolithic period, but most are from the early Roman period. A local resident and metal detector expert reported finding over 25 Bar Kokhba coins, including 20 bronze coins with a palm tree, one with a jar, and 6 silver dinars. David Amit and Amos Frumkin suggest that the cave was used by the rebels as a refuge cave.

The Cave of Letters, together with caves at Wadi Murabba'at, yielded the "Bar Kokhba letters," a collection of at least 23 missives exchanged between the leader and his subordinates. These archives include his correspondence with Yeshua ben Galgula, commander of Herodium, and Jonathan ben Ba'ayan, commander of Ein Gedi. Written in Hebrew, Aramaic, and Greek, the letters reflect a multilingual population and suggest the presence of non-Jewish auxiliaries within the rebel ranks, as indicated by a reference to a person bearing the pagan name Hermas who, according to one letter, "is unable to (read and) write Hebrew."

A survey of less studied parts of the southern Judaean Desert began in 2001. Before that date, 27 Bar Kokhba refuge caves were known from the Judaean Desert. In the Ein Gedi oasis, centered on two wadis, Nahal David and Nahal Arugot, there are numerous caves, two of which have yielded Bar Kokhba findings since 2001, the Har Yishai Cave and the Sabar Cave, both on the northern side of Nahal David. In 2004, fragments of a Leviticus scroll, brought to the cave in the summer of 135 CE, at the end of the Bar Kokhba Revolt, were discovered in the 'Nahal Arugot cave' (see Dead Sea Scrolls). The 'Caves of the Spear' are a group of five refuge caves discovered north of Ein Gedi during the 2001-2004 survey, where Bar Kokhba coins, glass vessels, and weaponry were found, including a rare spearhead.

Other known Bar Kokhba refuge caves are 'Araq el-Battan in Nahal Shiloh, the Nahal Qidron cave, and the Wadi el-Makkuk (Nahal Makuk) caves.

== See also ==
- Archaeology of the Bar Kokhba Revolt
- Babatha
- Bar Kokhba revolt
- Bar Kokhba revolt coinage
- Bar Kokhba hiding complexes
- Dead Sea Scrolls
- Qumran

== Sources ==
- Aharoni, Yohanan (1962). "Expedition B — The Cave of Horrors". Israel Exploration Journal. 12 (3–4). Israel Exploration Society: 186–199. JSTOR 27924906.
- Cotton, Hannah (1995). "The archive of Salome Komaise daughter of Levi: another archive from the 'Cave of Letters'". Zeitschrift für Papyrologie und Epigraphik. 105: 171–208. JSTOR 20189273.
- Doering, Lutz (2018). "Bar Kokhba Letters". In Brooke, George J.; Hempel, Charlotte (eds.). T&T Clark Companion to the Dead Sea Scrolls. Bloomsbury T&T Clark. pp. 289–294. doi:10.5040/9780567669858.ch-030. ISBN 978-0-567-66985-8.
- Gichon, Mordechai (1986). "New insight into the Bar Kokhba War and a reappraisal of Dio Cassius 69.12–13". The Jewish Quarterly Review. 77 (1). University of Pennsylvania Press: 15–43. doi:10.2307/1454444. JSTOR 1454444.
- Magness, Jodi (2012). The Archaeology of the Holy Land: From the Destruction of Solomon's Temple to the Muslim Conquest. Cambridge University Press. ISBN 978-1-139-01383-3.
- Sion, Ofer; Ganor, Amir; Klein, Eitan; Amichay, Oriya; Hamer, Hagay; Cohen, Chaim (2023). "The Renewed Excavations in the Cave of Horror". In Sion, Ofer; Uziel, Joe; Ganor, Amir; Klein, Eitan (eds.). New Studies in the Archaeology of the Judean Desert: Collected Papers. Jerusalem: Israel Antiquities Authority. pp. 89–106. doi:10.2307/jj.10329820.7.
