= Papyrus Cotton =

2nd century legal papyrus

Papyrus Cotton is an ancient legal document discovered in the Judaean Desert and dating to approximately 129/130–132 CE, during the reign of Emperor Hadrian and on the eve of the Bar Kokhba revolt. It is the longest Greek-language papyrus found in the region and preserves the notes of a Roman prosecutor involved in a legal case against two Jewish defendants, Gadalias and Saulos. The text details an elaborate scheme of tax evasion involving document forgery and fraudulent slave sales, carried out across the provinces of Judaea and Arabia to circumvent Roman taxation.

== Discovery and context ==
The papyrus was likely discovered in Nahal Hever in the 1950s, in a canyon west of the Dead Sea where Bar Kokhba rebels had hidden from Roman forces. Originally misclassified as Nabatean writing, the document remained undeciphered in the Israel Antiquities Authority archives until 2014, when Hannah M. Cotton Paltiel, a classicist at the Hebrew University of Jerusalem, identified it as written in ancient Greek while working in the authority's conservation laboratory.

The papyrus was analyzed by an international team: Anna Dolganov (Austrian Academy of Sciences), Fritz Mitthof (University of Vienna), Hannah Cotton Paltiel and Avner Ecker (Hebrew University of Jerusalem), with their findings published in the journal Tyche in January 2025.

== The text ==
The papyrus documents a case which occurred during Emperor Hadrian's reign, and was composed approximately 129/130–132 CE,—shortly before the Bar Kokhba revolt (132–135 CE). This was a period of increasing tension between Roman authorities and the Jewish population of Judaea, coming about 62 years after the destruction of the Jewish Temple in Jerusalem (70 CE) and only 15 years after the Diaspora Revolt (115–117 CE).

At 133 lines, the papyrus contains the longest Greek-language text ever discovered in the Judean Desert. According to classicist Dennis P. Kehoe, "The document provides rare and highly interesting evidence for the slave trade in this part of the empire, as well as the circumstances under which Jews might have slaves."

=== Defendants ===
The case involved two Jewish defendants, identified by their biblical names. The first defendant is Gadalias (Gedaliah), the son of a notary with possible connections to local administrative elites. He had a criminal history including extortion, counterfeiting, banditry, sedition, and repeated failure to appear for jury duty. The second defendant, Saulos (Saul), is described as Gadalias's friend and collaborator, and alleged mastermind of the tax evasion scheme.

=== Allegations ===
The defendants were accused of two violations of Roman law: forgery and fraud. According to the deciphered text, Saulos, residing in Judaea, arranged fictitious sales of his slaves to an associate named Chaereas who lived in the neighboring province of Arabia. While on paper these slaves were transferred across provincial lines, they physically remained with Saulos. Gadalias, the son of a notary, produced the forged documents necessary for the transactions, providing evidence that the slaves had left Judea but never officially arrived in Arabia. Through the scheme, the conspirators reportedly managed to evade the 4% tax on slave sales and 5% on manumissions that would otherwise have been due to Roman authorities.

=== Possible motives ===
The tax evasion scheme may have served purposes beyond personal financial benefit. While it remains unclear whether the slaves in question were Jewish, Saulos and Gadalias may have been attempting to fulfill the biblical obligation to free slaves, while circumventing the imperial taxes associated with manumission.

=== Legal Proceedings and Roman administration ===
The scheme was uncovered possibly through an informant—the document suggests Saulos himself may have betrayed Chaereas to protect himself during the investigation. During the trial, Gadalias blamed his deceased father for the forgeries, while Saulos attributed the illegal manumissions to Chaereas. The unnamed Roman prosecutors displayed sophisticated legal strategies and rhetorical techniques, demonstrating high-level legal expertise.

Under Roman law, such crimes could be punished by fines, exile, hard labor, or execution, though the papyrus does not reveal the final verdict.

== See also ==
- Babatha archive
- Tebtunis papyri

== Bibliography ==
- Dolganov, Anna; Mitthof, Fritz; Cotton, Hannah M.; Ecker, Avner (2025). "Forgery and Fiscal Fraud in Iudaea and Arabia on the Eve of the Bar Kokhba Revolt: Memorandum and Minutes of a Trial before a Roman Official (P.Cotton)". Tyche. 38. doi:10.25365/tyche-2023-38-5.
