= El-Jai cave =

Karstic cave in the Judaean Desert

Coordinates: 31°50′54″N 35°18′17″E

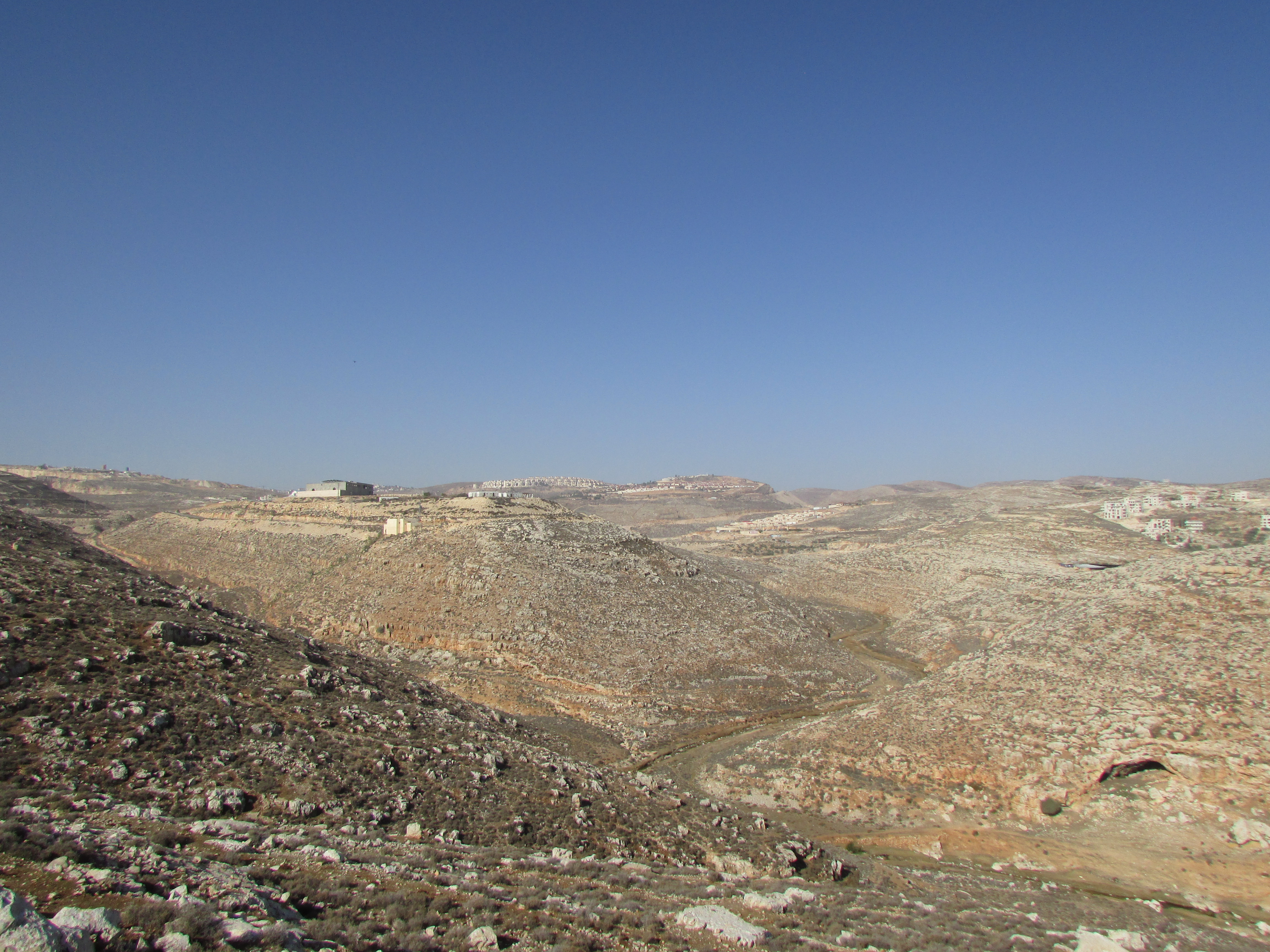
A view of Nahal Michmas, where the el-Jai cave is located

El-Jai cave is a sizable karstic cave located in a cliff within the northern Judaean Desert, in the modern-day West Bank.

The El-Jai cave served as a refuge cave for Jewish rebels during the late phase of the Bar Kokhba Revolt, around 135 CE. A collection of 16 coins was discovered within the cave, with most seem to have been deposited towards the end of the revolt. Among these, were four Bar Kokhba coins and two Aelia Capitolina coins featuring Hadrian and Sabina. This discovery supported Cassius Dio's historical timeline over Eusebius's, affirming that the Romans established the colony of Aelia Capitolina over the ruins of Jerusalem prior to the revolt, rather than afterward. Additionally, it suggested that coin minting in the new colony commenced before the end of the revolt.

== Name ==
According to Palmer, the cave's name in Arabic, Mugharet el Jai (Arabic: مغارة الجعي), means "cave of el Jai", with el Jai being a proper name.

== Geography ==
The el-Jai cave is located in Nahal Michmas (Wadi Suweinit), in the northern Judaean Desert.

== Research history ==
Research on the cave commenced in June 1881 with a survey conducted by the Survey of Western Palestine team. A further survey was undertaken by Uri Dinur in the mid-1980s, although no Roman-era artifacts were discovered at that time.

In February 1997, archaeological looting prompted further investigation, leading to the discovery of pottery shards and fragments of glass vessels dating to the Bar Kokhba Revolt period. In January 1998, a thorough survey by Hanan Eshel and Boaz Zissu employing a metal detector yielded sixteen coins.

== Identification with Rock of Rimmon ==
In the 1880s, William Birch and Hardwicke Rawnsley suggested the el-Jai cave as the potential location of the Rock of Rimmon, a site in the wilderness mentioned in the Book of Judges where 600 Benjaminites sought sanctuary for four months after the Battle of Gibeah. Patrick Arnold revived this identification in the 1990s, describing the el-Jai cave as a "split rock that looks like a pomegranate".

However, Chris McKinny rejects this identification, stating that there is insufficient archaeological or toponymic evidence linking the el-Jai cave to the Rock of Rimmon. McKinley instead suggests to identify the Rock of Rimmon with the caves of Wadi el-Rummananeh.

== Bar Kokhba coin deposit ==
=== Findings ===
A total of 16 coins were uncovered within the cave, along with fragments like the rim of a jug and storage jar found in the deepest part of the cave, suggesting archaeological looting activities. Two Aelia Capitolina coins were found, one depicting the city's founding with Hadrian ploughing its borders, while the other featured Sabina, Hadrian's wife. Additionally, a variety of coins spanning different Roman emperors' reigns were found, such as a Nabatean coin dating back to 18–25 CE, a denarius from the time of Claudius in 54 CE, and denarii from Titus, Trajan, and Hadrian, among others.

=== Analysis ===
It is believed that Jewish refugees brought these coins to the cave, possibly towards the end of the revolt. Prior to this discovery, only two Bar Kokhba coins had been found north of Jerusalem.

The presence of both Bar Kokhba and Aelia Capitolina coins in a single collection contradicts Eusebius's account, which suggests that Aelia Capitolina was established after the revolt. Instead, it supports Cassius Dio's account, indicating that the city's foundation predated the revolt and possibly played a role in its inception.

Eshel and Zissu argue that the el-Jai discoveries indicate coin minting in Aelia Capitolina prior to 135 CE. While the city seems to have been founded in 130 CE, operational delays may have postponed mint activity until the Bar Kokhba Revolt. Economic isolation between rebel territories and Roman controlled-areas diminishes the likelihood of finding Bar Kokhba coins overstruck on new Aelia coins. According to the two scholars, the rebels' shift in coin formulae, from 'Year One of the Freedom of Israel' to 'For the Freedom of Jerusalem,' likely responds to the introduction of pagan coins from Aelia Capitolina.
