= Wadi Daliyeh =

Wadi with caves in the central West Bank

Coordinates: 31.99406°N 35.40939°E

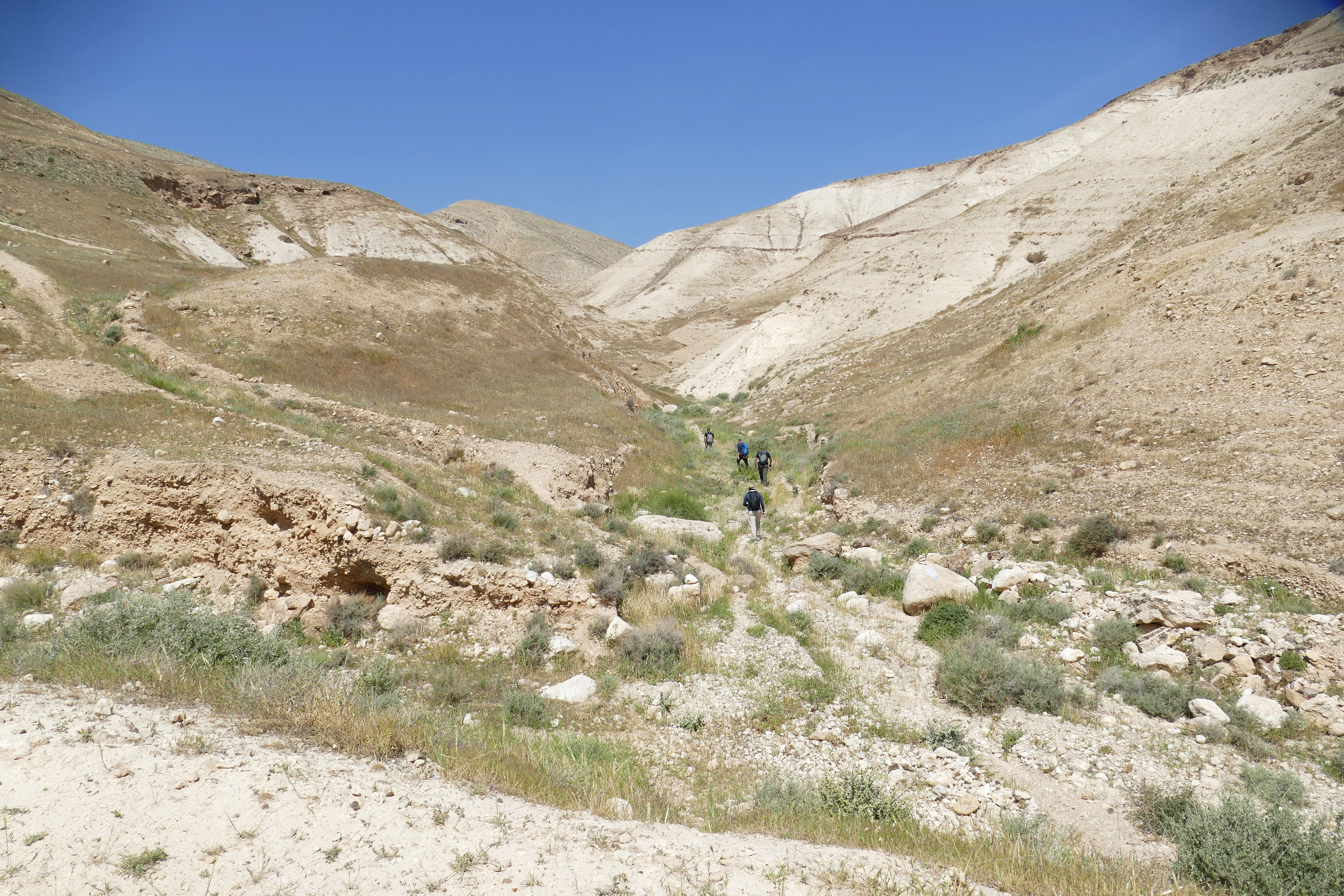
Wadi Daliyeh.

The Wadi Daliyeh (وادي دالية) is a wadi in the West Bank, located fourteen kilometres north of Jericho, flowing east from the Samarian hills down to the Jordan Valley. The valley has caves containing archaeological material.

The principal cave, Abu Shinjah, yielded an assemblage dated mostly to the 4th century BCE, including approximately 200 legal and administrative papyri in Aramaic, seal impressions, coins, pottery, textiles, wooden objects, jewellery, and human skeletal remains. These finds have been associated with a group of Samaritan elites who may have sought refuge in the cave during upheavals following the Samaritan uprising against Macedonian officials following the region's conquest by Alexander the Great, and died there. The documents record transactions such as slave sales, property transfers, loans, and marriage agreements. Two seal impressions mention a governor of Samaria named Sanballat, likely belonging to the line known from Nehemiah, the Elephantine Papyri, and Josephus. The nearby En-Na'asaneh Cave preserves earlier remains from the Intermediate Bronze Age as well as later evidence from the Bar Kokhba revolt (132–136 CE), including pottery, glass vessels, tools, keys, and coins. During this period, the cave may have served as the northernmost refuge cave of the rebels.

== Location ==
The two archaeologically significant caves in the wadi are located within its gorge, approximately 3.5 kilometers east of Netiv HaGdud. The site (188/155 PAL grid) lies at an elevation of 110 meters above sea level, surrounded by steep cliffs. The nearest spring, 'Ein al-'Aujah, is situated 4.7 kilometers away.

== Archaeological discoveries ==
=== Mughâret Abū Shinjeh ===
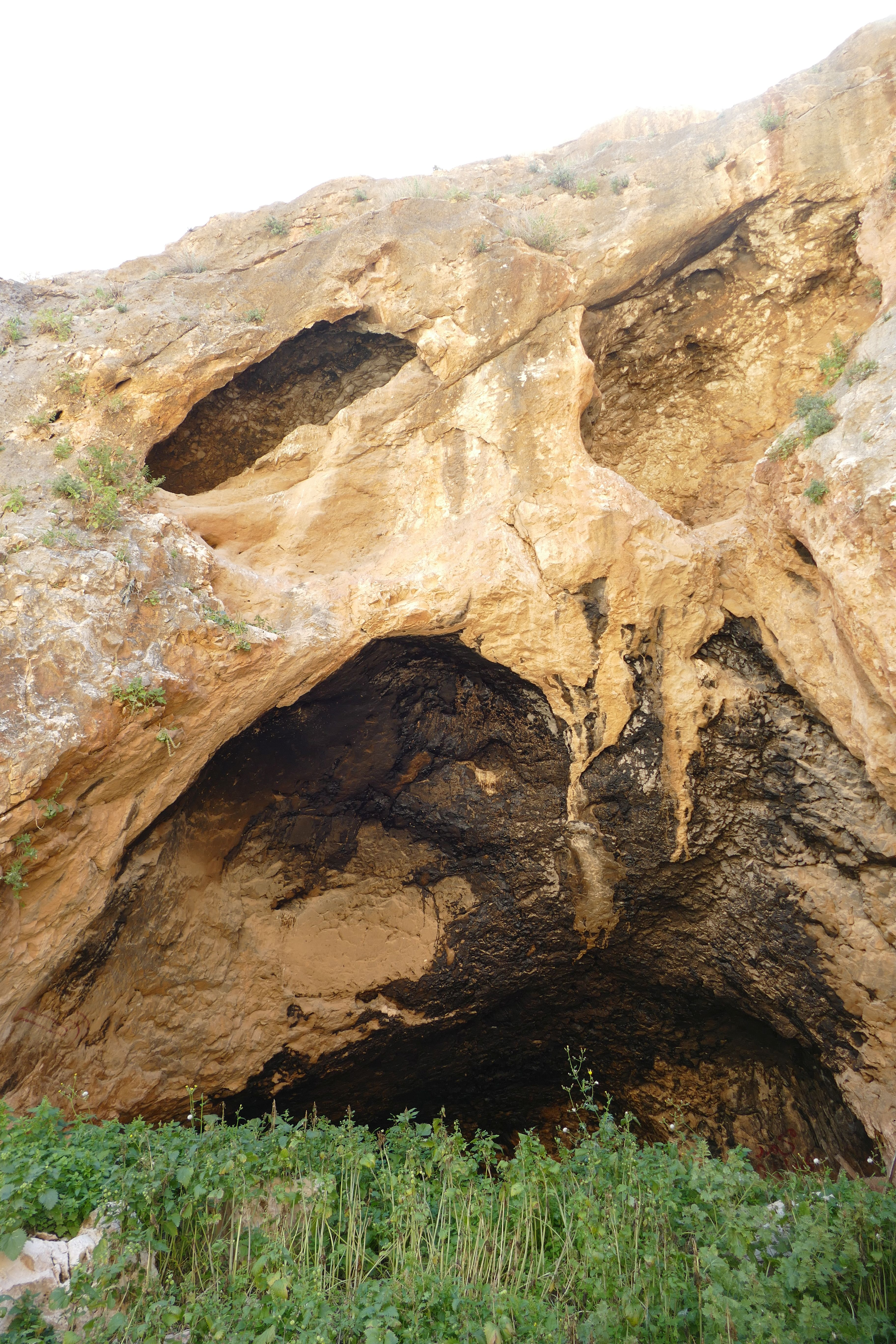
Entrance to Mughâret Abū Shinjeh.

In 1962 and 1963, Frank Moore Cross, former professor of Hebrew at Harvard University, purchased a hoard of ancient papyri and stamp seals originally discovered by members of the Bedouin tribe of Ta'amireh. The purchase also included a few coins and two gold rings. Bedouins also led Cross to Mughâret Abū Shinjeh cave (Arabic: مغارة ابو سخبه) where in 1963-1964, he conducted excavations unearthing more papyri along with stamp seals, some still intact, and various human remains. The papyri are written in Aramaic and dated to the end of Achaemenid rule over Samaria. The material of the site was understood as the remains of noble Samaritans who had fled from the reprisals of Alexander the Great in 331 BCE, following the murder of his satrap, Andromachus of Cyprus.

In the wadi were discovered 18 partially legible Aramaic legal papyri and clay seals inscriptions from the 4th BCE, during the reigns of Artaxerses and Artaxerses II. These were excavated in 1963 and the papyri are now housed in the Rockefeller Museum in Jerusalem. The contents of the documents include the deeds for the sale of slaves. The most recent studies are: Wadi Daliyeh II: the Samaria papyri from Wadi Daliyeh by Douglas Marvin Gropp, pp. 1–116 in DJD XXVIII (2001); The Wadi Daliyeh Seal Impressions Vol.1 by Mary Joan Winn Leith(Oxford, 1997); and "Les manuscrits araméens du Wadi Daliyeh et la Samarie vers 450–332 av. J.-C." by Jan Dušek (Leiden: Brill, 2007).

Among the seal impressions were two bearing inscriptions in ancient Hebrew script that mention "Sanballat, Governor of Samaria". The title corresponds to the Persian period administrative office overseeing the province of Samaria within the Achaemenid Empire. The personal name Sanballat is well known from 5th-century BCE sources, most prominently the biblical Book of Nehemiah and the Aramaic papyri from Elephantine, an island in Egypt which was home to a Jewish community in the Persian era. The bullae, however, date to the 4th-century BCE and are attributed to a later member of the same ruling family, active shortly before Alexander's conquest of the region.

=== Iraq en-Na'sana ===
During the second season of the British excavations in Wadi Daliyeh, the cave of Iraq en-Na'sana was excavated. The cave, consisting of a series of large halls connected by narrow passages, contained material from the Intermediate Bronze Age (2500–2000 BCE) and from the time of the Bar Kokhba revolt in the early 2nd century CE. The cave is the northernmost of the refuge caves of the rebels. The Bronze Age material suggest habitation; ceramic assemblage includes storage jars, cooking pots, juglets, cups, goblets, and a multi-spouted lamp concentrated near the entrance hall. The finds from the Bar Kokhba period were found in a more secluded inner chamber; they include domestic pottery, glass vessels, personal ornaments, tools, keys, wooden implements, and coins, among them Roman silver issues of Trajan and Hadrian, as well as a coin of the revolt.

== See also ==
- Dead Sea Scrolls
