= Cave of Horrors =

Cave in the Judaean Desert in Israel

- מערת האימה (Hebrew)
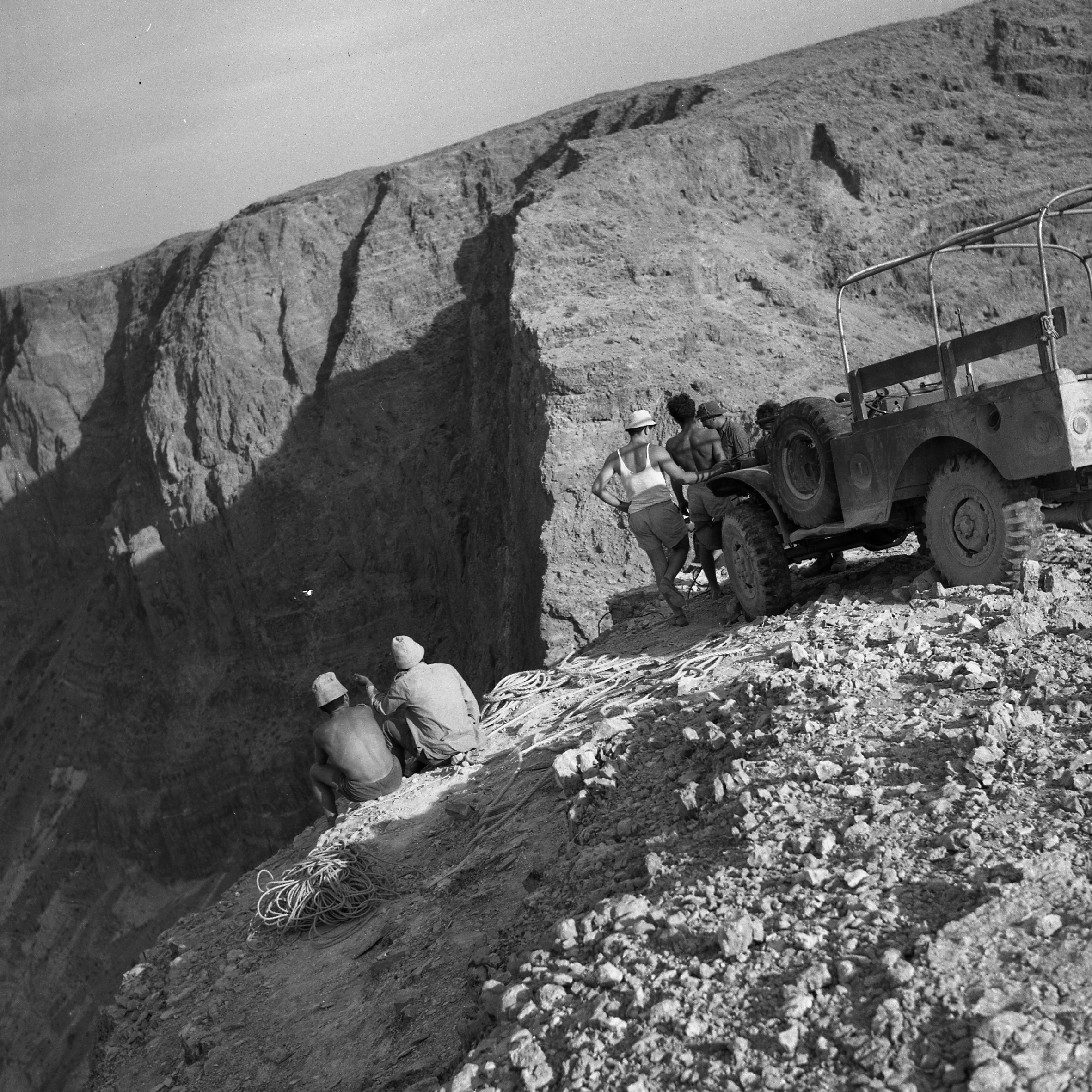
- Survey of Israel team handling a rope ladder above the Cave of Horrors, 1953

- Location in Israel
- 31°25′48″N 35°20′52″E
- Type: Karstic cave
- Periods: Neolithic, Chalcolithic, Early Bronze Age, Early Roman period, Jewish–Roman wars, Byzantine period
- Associated with: Jewish rebels
- Location: Nahal Hever, South District, Israel
- Region: Judaean Desert
- Part of: Bar Kokhba refuge caves

History
- Event: Bar Kokhba revolt

Site notes
- Excavation dates: 1961, 2019
- Archaeologists: Yohanan Aharoni, Ofer Sion, Eitan Klein, Oriya Amichay, Hagai Hamer, and Amir Ganor
- Discovered: 1953

Cave of Horrors ('Ma'arat Ha'eimim') or Cave of Horror (Hebrew: מערת האימה, lit. 'Me'arat Ha'Eima') is the nickname given to a refuge cave that archaeologists have catalogued as Nahal Hever Cave 8 (8Hev) of the Judaean Desert, Israel, where the remains of Jewish refugees from the Bar Kokhba revolt (c. 132–136 AD) were found.

== Location ==
The cave lies in the cliffs towering from the south over the wadi known in Hebrew as Nahal Hever. Nearby, in the cliffs on the opposite side of the stream, is the Cave of Letters, where many documents from the Bar Kokhba revolt were uncovered. The cave lays southwest of and not far from Ein Gedi and north of Masada.

== Description ==
The cave has 2 natural entrances - eastern and western - both opening onto a steep slope which is around 170 m above sea level, adjacent to an ancient path descending to waterholes and a waterfall. The cave extends roughly 60 m in length. Entering west would lead to a low passage which opens in a 4x4 cavity. From there it then leads to the main chamber which is about 20 m long, 4 m wide, and 4 m high. It then branches off into a narrow tunnel and a passage which culminates into an eastern opening.

== Discoveries ==
In 1951 or 52, Bedouin excavated the cave in an unsupervised dig, found the bulk of the manuscript fragments, and sold them to researchers in Jordanian-controlled East Jerusalem, who published them, while acknowledging that the provenance was uncertain. As a consequence, the cave was identified and excavated in the 1950s and '60s by Prof. Yigael Yadin and Prof. Yohanan Aharoni.

The main findings made in the 1950s-60s and again in 2021 belong to three periods: the Neolithic, the Chalcolithic, and the final years of the Bar Kokhba revolt during the Roman period, the latter findings being the most consequential ones.

=== Bar Kokhba revolt ===
At the top of the cliff above the Cave of Horror were the ruins of a Roman camp, similar to the one found above the Cave of Letters.

The skeletons of 40 men, women and children were discovered inside. Of the 40 dead the names of three are known, since inscribed potsherds (ostraca) bearing their names were found placed on their remains. Evidence suggests these individuals were Jewish rebels and their families who took refuge in the cave during the Bar Kohba Revolt who had ultimately died there.

In investigations following the first one by Yigael Yadin, a number of fragments of letters and writings were discovered in the cave, among them a number of Bar Kokhba coins and a Greek copy of the biblical Book of the Twelve Prophets.

==== Greek Minor Prophets scroll ====
The scroll (with possibly a second partial one kept together with it), containing a Greek translation of the "Twelve Minor Prophets", was already old by the time it was brought into the cave, since it was dated to ca. 50 BC. Some 60 years later, in March 2021, archaeologists discovered new fragments belonging to the same scroll, a Greek translation of the Book of the Twelve, different from the Septuagint and with the name of God, Yahweh, written in Old Hebrew script among the otherwise Greek text. The newly discovered fragments, which belong to the Books of Zechariah and Nahum, contain surprising variations compared to the Masoretic Text commonly used today. No scroll fragments had been discovered by archaeologists in the previous approximately 60 years.

=== Chalcolithic child burial ===
The partially mummified 6000-year-old remains of a child, probably a girl aged between 6 and 12, were found in March 2021 under two flat stones in a shallow pit grave with the help of CT (CAT) scan. The burial dates to the Chalcolithic period. The child had been buried in a fetal position and covered with a cloth resembling a small blanket, wrapped around its head and chest, but not its feet.

=== Neolithic basket ===
A 10,500 year old Neolithic era basket was discovered in the cave. It is made by weaving. The basket, described by the Israel Antiquities Authority as the world's oldest intact woven basket, was preserved due to the desert's arid climate. It could hold around 90-100 liters and dates to the Pre-Pottery Neolithic period, predating the Dead Sea Scrolls by over eight millennia.

== See also ==
- Archaeology of Israel
- List of the Dead Sea Scrolls
