= Te'omim Cave =

Cave and nature reserve in Israel

- Twins Cave; מערת התאומים
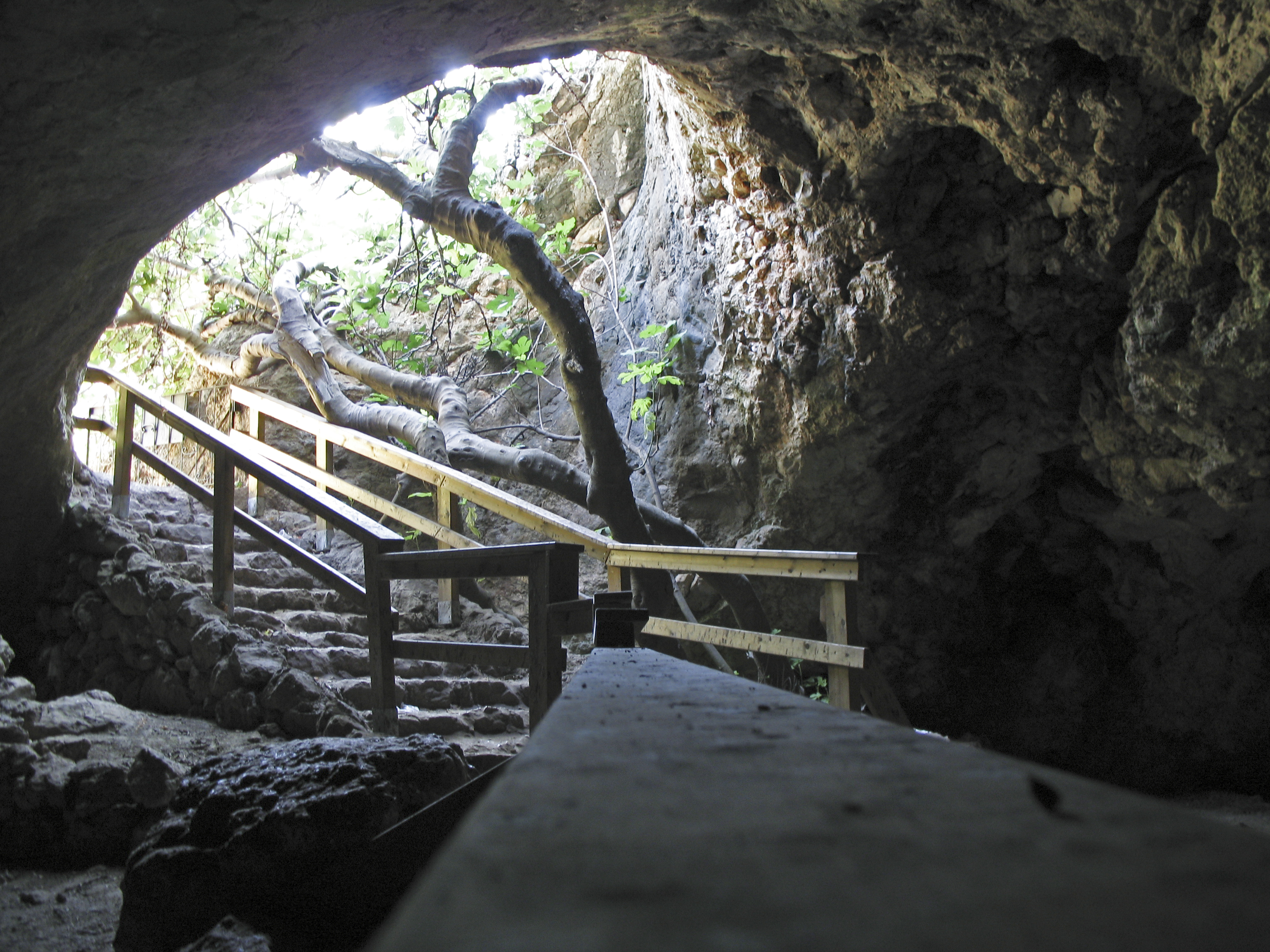
- Entrance to the cave

- Location within Israel
- Location: Jerusalem District, Israel
- Nearest city: Bet Shemesh
- Coordinates: 31°43′37″N 35°01′23″E
- Established: March 23, 1967
- Governing body: Israel Nature and Parks Authority

The Te'omim Cave (Hebrew: מערת התאומים, romanized: Məʿarat ha-Tə'ōmīm, lit. 'Cave of the Twins'), or the Twins Cave, Arabic name Mughâret Umm et-Tûeimîn, is a karstic cave within a nature reserve in Israel located on the western edges of the Jerusalem Mountains, in the vicinity of Beit Shemesh.

The Te'omim Cave is a central highlight along a 3 kilometers (1.9 mi) walking trail regarded as one of the most renowned and popular touristic sites in the area. For the protection of the hibernating bat population, the cave is closed to visitors during the winter season, from November 1 to March 31. However, during the other seasons, it is open to the public.

The cave holds significant archaeological significance, with discoveries spanning different historical periods. Noteworthy discoveries include human bone remains, weaponry, and coin hoards, indicating its role as a refuge cave for Jewish rebels and refugees during the Bar Kokhba revolt. Furthermore, evidence of an ancient alabaster quarry dating to the Middle Bronze Age and of a possible Late Roman period cultic site associated with necromancy has been discovered in the cave, adding to its archaeological importance.

== Description ==
The Te'omim Cave is situated on the northern bank of Nahal Meara ("cave stream"), a stream flowing from the Judaean Mountains to the Mediterranean Sea. It spans 50 meters (160 ft) in width and 75 meters (246 ft) in length and features a prominent fig tree near its entrance. It is classified as a karstic cave, formed through the gradual erosion of limestone rock by water. This geological process has led to the development of numerous stalactites and stalagmites within the cave. The central chamber of the cave extends about 20 meters (66 ft) deep, concluding with a small, constructed pool fed by spring water. Additionally, smaller passages branch off from the central chamber.

== Name ==
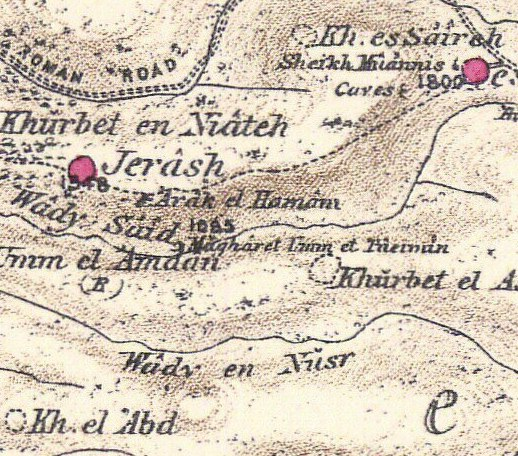
1880s PEF Survey of Palestine map showing the Te'omim Cave (Mŭghâret Umm et Tûeimîn) near the villages of Jerash and Sufla (both since depopulated)

During the 19th century, local Arab fellahin shared traditions and customs related to the cave, often attributing healing properties to the spring water within it. One notable tradition recounts the story of a woman who drank water dripping from the ceiling of the cave and subsequently became pregnant with twins, which resulted in the caves becoming known as Mŭghâret Umm et Tûeimîn (Arabic: مغارة أم التوائم, lit. 'Cave of the Mother of the Twins'). In 1873, C.R. Conder and H.H. Kitchener's wrote that local peasants executed women accused of immorality by casting them into the cave's shaft.

== Bat population ==
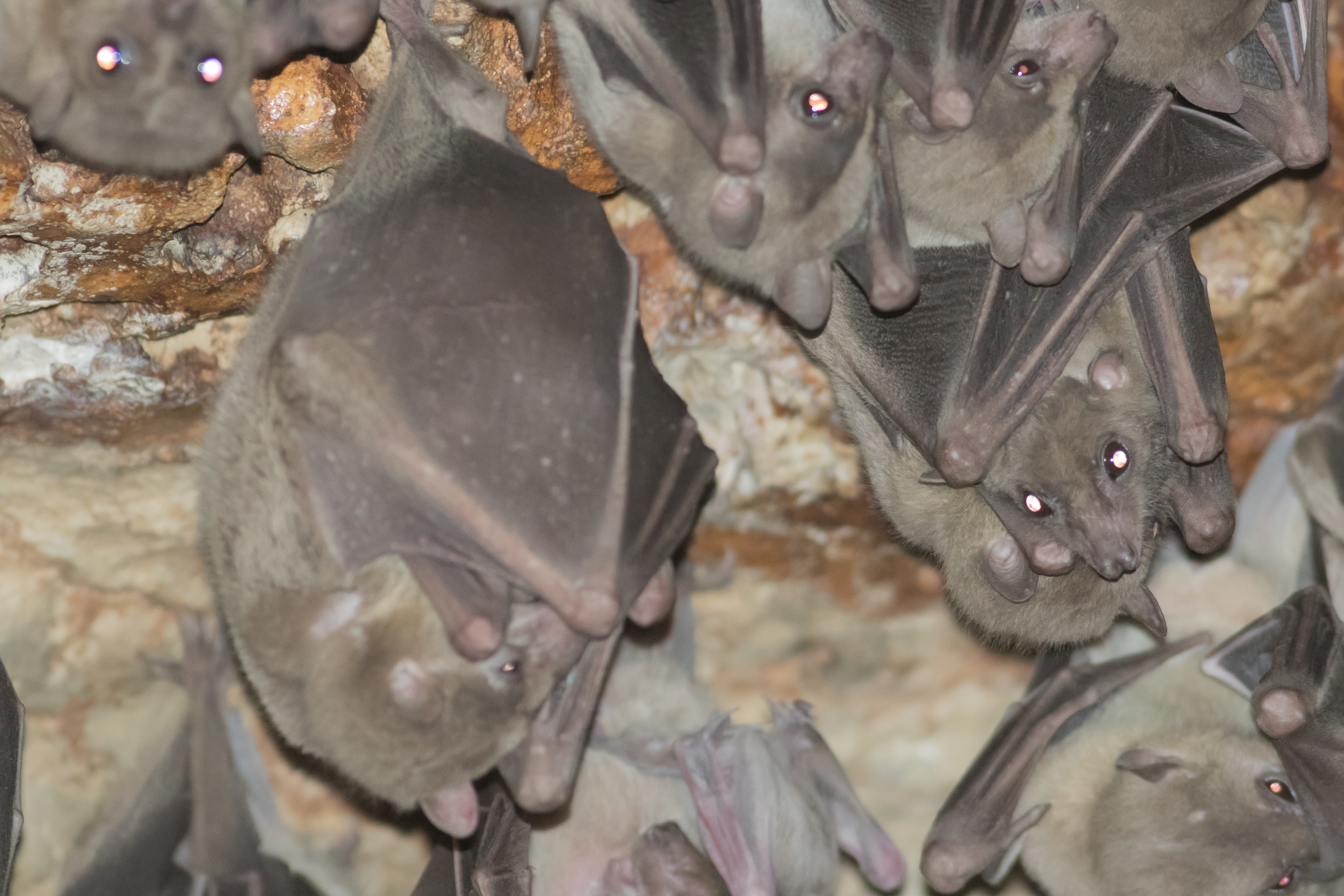
Egyptian fruit bats hanging from the cave's ceiling

The Twin Cave is also home to four distinct species of bats: Natterer's bat and the serotine bat from the Vespertilionidae family, the lesser horseshoe bat from the Rhinolophidae family, and the Egyptian fruit bat from the Pteropodinae family. There are approximately 3,000 bats living in the cave.

== Archaeology ==
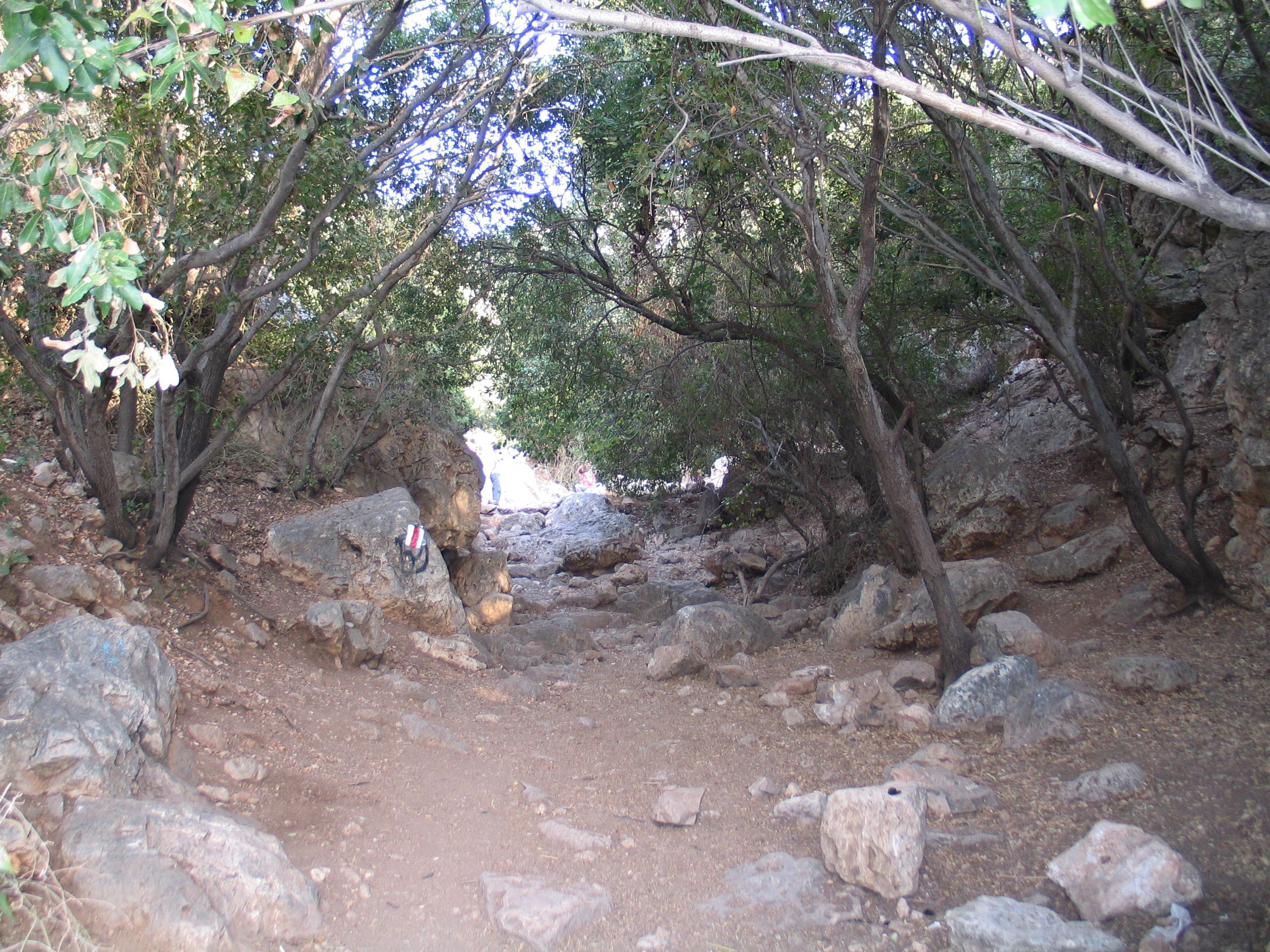
The walking trail guiding visitors to the cave entrance

=== Research history ===
The first comprehensive examination of the cave was carried out on October 17, 1873, by C. R. Conder and H. H. Kitchener of the Palestine Exploration Fund. Their detailed report included a map of the cave. Notably, at the northern end of the entrance hall, they encountered a deep pit but did not venture into it, nor did they observe the continuation of the cave north of that point.

In the late 1920s, René Neuville, a diplomat and archaeologist who was serving as the French consul in Jerusalem at the time, conducted excavations at the base of the cave's large entrance hall. His findings yielded a diverse collection of artifacts, including ceramic, wooden, and stone vessels dating from various historical periods such as the Neolithic and Chalcolithic (Ghassulian) Ages, Early Bronze Age I(?), Middle Bronze Age II(?), Iron Age, and Roman and Byzantine periods.

Following this, between 1970 and 1974, Gideon Mann conducted an extensive study of the cave on behalf of the Society for the Protection of Nature in Israel. Mann's primary focus was on the deep pit situated at the northern end of the entrance hall. This investigation led to the revelation of natural karst passages that extended into two inner chambers within the cave. His work involved mapping and the recovery of pottery artifacts dating from the time of the Bar Kokhba revolt (132–136 CE).

In 2009, a new phase of research on the cave was initiated, led by the Cave Research Center at the Hebrew University of Jerusalem, in collaboration with the Martin (Szusz) Department of Land of Israel Studies and Archaeology of the Bar-Ilan University. Since then, cave explorations have unearthed artifacts from various historical periods, spanning from the Neolithic era to the present day. The primary periods illuminated by these discoveries are the Middle Bronze Age (circa 2000–1550 BCE), the Bar Kokhba revolt (around 132–136 CE), and the Late Roman–Early Byzantine periods (late second to fourth centuries CE).

=== Findings from the Bar Kokhba revolt ===
Archaeological findings indicate that the Te'omim cave functioned as a refuge for Jewish rebels hiding from the Roman army during the Bar Kokhba revolt, a pattern observed in clandestine hideouts throughout ancient Judea. Within its inner chambers, archaeologists uncovered bone remains of the rebels, along with a cache of weapons and hoards of coins, including dozens of Bar Kokhba coins. Antiquities robbers found similar-sized hoards of Bar Kokhba coinage twice, with discoveries in Beit Ummar in 1976 and near Dhahiriya in 1980. In light of these findings, scholars propose that Jewish fighters sought refuge in the cave towards the end of the revolt. It is possible they were accompanied by other refugees from a nearby Jewish village. These individuals were likely familiar with the cave's concealed inner section, which was challenging to access, hidden from plain view, and offered a reliable source of water.

One of the hoards found within the cave is notable as the largest collection of silver Bar Kokhba coins uncovered by archaeologists, as opposed to being found by antiquities looters. This hoard comprises various coins from different years of the revolt. It includes one sela' (tetradrachm) from the first year of the "Redemption of Israel", six sela'im from the second year of the "Freedom of Israel", and 13 sela'im from the third year of the revolt. This hoard lacks any denarii from the first year of the revolt. Notably, four denarii in the collection feature the names "Shim'on" on one side and "Eleazar the Priest" on the other, believed to be minted in the second year of the revolt. Aside from these, there are an additional 13 denarii from the second year and 46 denarii from the final year, bearing the inscription "For the Freedom of Jerusalem". A second hoard of coins found at the cave is of particular significance because it represents the first instance of Bar Kokhba revolt coinage being found together with earlier Jewish coins dating from the Second Temple period. This collection includes shekels from the First Jewish–Roman War and a bronze prutah from the time of Hasmonean ruler John Hyrcanus. The existence of the latter, an earlier, lower-value coin, implies that these coins might not have been kept primarily for their monetary worth but rather cherished as symbols of nationalistic importance.

=== Alabaster quarry ===
During the 2009 study, archaeologists also unearthed evidence of an ancient alabaster quarry within the cave. This quarry was utilized to extract calcitic deposits, which were then used to craft luxury vessels. Through uranium–thorium dating, researchers were able to trace the quarry's origins back to the Middle Bronze Age. The dating aligns with archaeological discoveries uncovered within the cave, alongside the distribution of calcite-alabaster artifacts throughout the southern Levant during this period.

=== Late Roman cultic site ===
During a survey conducted between 2010 and 2016, over 120 intact oil lamps were discovered in the cave, primarily dating from the second to fourth centuries CE. These lamps were intentionally placed within narrow crevices in the cave's main chamber walls or beneath debris. Some of these crevices contained clusters of oil lamps, alongside weapons, pottery vessels from earlier periods, and even human skulls. This suggests the possibility that these objects were used in necromantic rituals during the Late Roman period, possibly indicating the cave's function as a local oracle.

The excavators proposed that the primary cultic ceremonies in the Te'omim Cave may have revolved around the placement of oil lamps for chthonic forces. These rituals could have been conducted within the cave to commune with the deceased and predict the future. The regional practice of using caves for ritualistic purposes during the Roman and Byzantine periods is documented in various sources, including the Mishnah and Jerusalem Talmud, which mention Simeon ben Shetach's trial of sixty witches in a cave near Ashqelon, as well as in writings by Epiphanius that reference rock-cut caves used for witchcraft. Because the cave is situated in an area that lost its Jewish population during the Bar Kokhba revolt and became predominantly non-Jewish, it is assumed that the individuals participating in the cave's rituals were primarily non-Jewish residents of the region.
