= Cave of Letters =

Refuge cave in Nahal Hever in the Judean Desert

- מערת האיגרות (Hebrew)
- Location in Israel
- 31°25′57.38″N 35°20′34.49″E
- Type: Karstic cave
- Periods: Jewish–Roman wars
- Associated with: Jewish rebels
- Location: Nahal Hever, South District, Israel
- Region: Judaean Desert
- Part of: Bar Kokhba refuge caves

History
- Event: Bar Kokhba Revolt

Site notes
- Archaeologists: Yohanan Aharoni, Yigael Yadin, Richard Freund

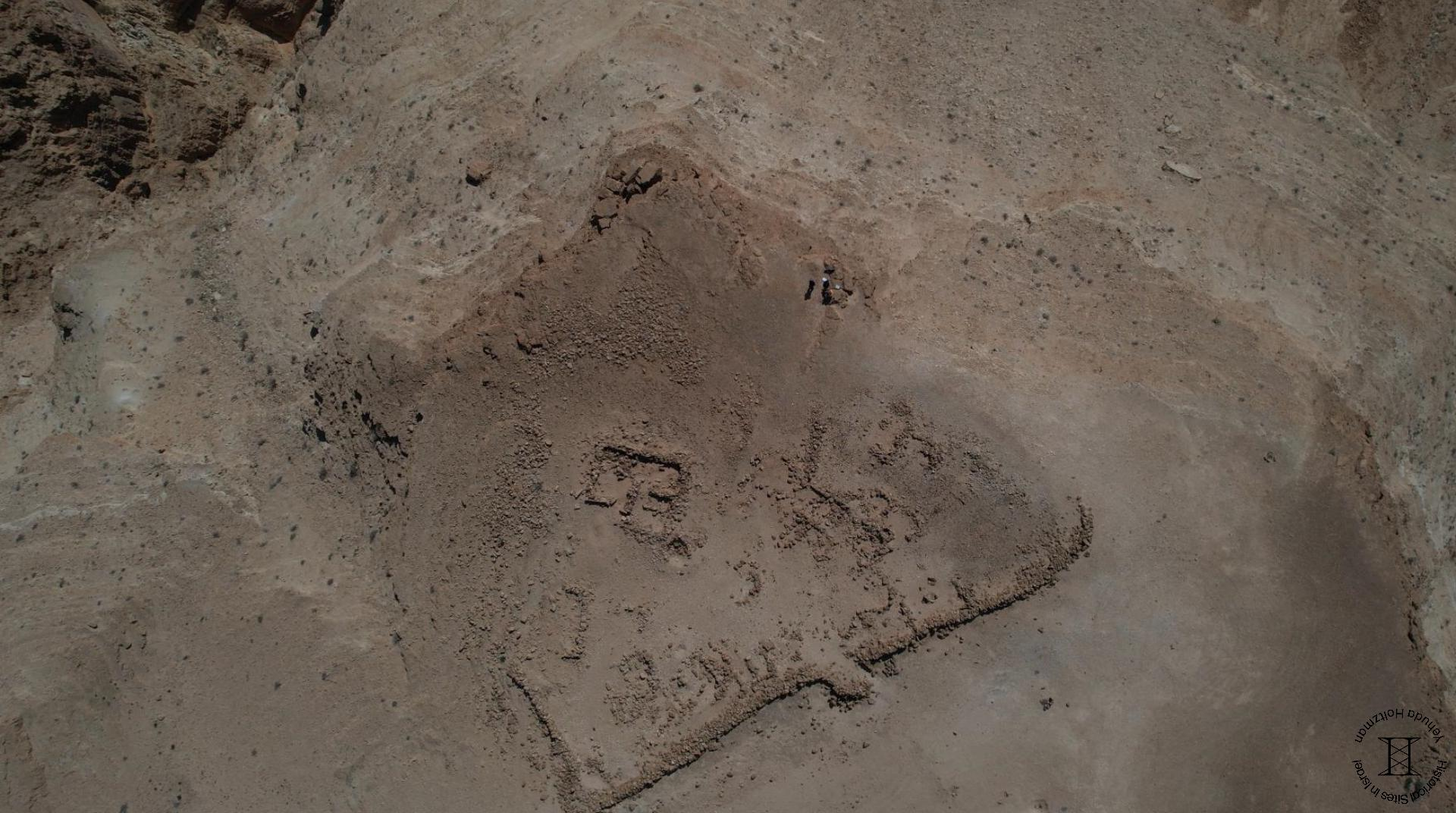
Roman army camp above the cave

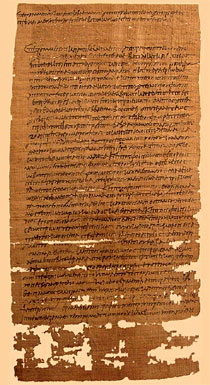
A scroll found in the cave, part of the Babatha archive

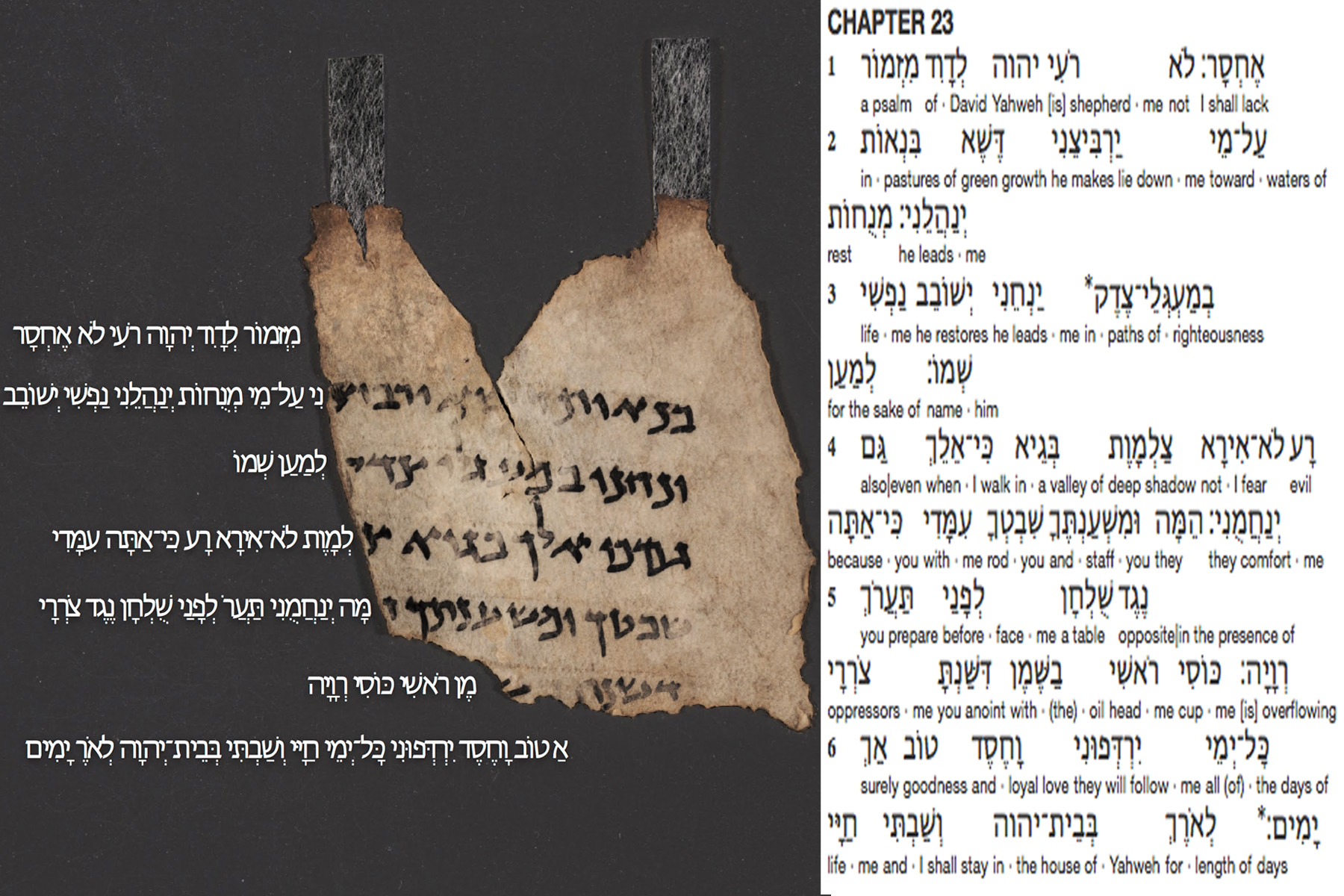
Image of a fragment of one of the biblical manuscripts found in the Cave of Letters

The Cave of Letters (Hebrew: מערת האיגרות, romanized: Marat Ha-Igerot) is a refuge cave in Nahal Hever in the Judaean Desert where letters and fragments of papyri from the Roman Empire period were found. Some are related to the Bar Kokhba Revolt (circa 131–136 CE), including letters of correspondence between Bar Kokhba and his subordinates. Another notable bundle of papyri, known as the Babatha cache, comprises legal documents of Babatha, a female landowner of the same period.

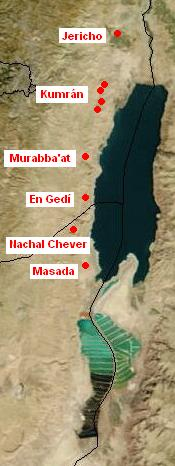
Manuscripts sites in the Judaean desert

== Geography ==
The cave is located at the head of Nahal Hever in the Judean Desert, about 40 kilometres (25 mi) south of Qumran, 20 km south of Wadi Murabba'at. The site is a few kilometers southwest of En-gedi, approximately 10 kilometers north of Masada, on the western shore of the Dead Sea. The cave has two openings, three halls and some crevices.

== History ==
The cave was discovered by Bedouin of the Ta'amireh tribe and explored in 1953 and 1955 by inspector of the Israel Department of Antiquities, Yohanan Aharoni. In 1953, after the sale of letters written by Bar-Kokhba found in the caves of Wadi Murabba'at, an expedition was organized to explore these caves. However the expedition first visited Nahal Hever, where the team noticed remnants of a Roman siege camp directly above the Cave of Letters. Another camp was also discovered on the southern side of the ravine.

In the Cave of Letters, archaeologists found Chalcolithic remains from the 4th millennium BCE as well as artifacts from the Roman period. Further exploration of the cave was abandoned because of some boulders obstructing access to other parts of the cave. It was not until 1960, when more documents from the Bar-Kokhba Revolt were sold to scholars in Jordan, that further exploration was approved. On March 23, 1960, four teams set out to explore the caves over a period of two weeks. Yigael Yadin led a team to search the northern side of the ravine at Nahal Hever.

== 1960 archeological finds ==
The first finding was of a niche of skulls. Tucked away in a crevice opening were remains of human skeletons, wrapped in textiles and covered in a large mat. One skeleton was covered by a colorful mat and other textiles, while the remains of a child dressed in a tunic were discovered in a leather lined basket. The textiles found were some of the earliest known of the Roman period and were dated around 135. These textiles were of importance in showing the kinds of dyes and the weaving material used. Also of importance was the acquisition of a complete set of clothes worn by Jews of the 1st and 2nd century. Among them were adult-sized mantles, a child's linen tunic, and some un-spun wool dyed purple.

Other finds of archeological significance were samples of Bar Kochba Revolt coinage, inscribed on one side 'Shimeon' and on the other, 'to the Freedom of Jerusalem' (לחרות ירושלם). Some arrows were found at the entrance to the cave, and a basket of bronze vessels and incense shovels. They had been made with Roman images on them, but the faces of the various pagan gods and creatures were defaced (see Aniconism in Judaism).

A tied bundle of documents, the Bar-Kokhba letters, was found in a waterskin, next to what were apparently a woman's belongings: wool, cosmetic tools, beads, a perfume flask and a mirror.

=== Bar Kokhba letters ===
Of fifteen letters, most were written in Aramaic and Hebrew, and two in Greek. Most were addressed from the leader (but not in one handwriting) to his subordinates Yehonathan and Masabala, who sat at En-Gedi. Yadin theorized that Yehonathan and Masabala finally carried their cache to the cave. The letters are linguistically interesting as they include many spelling errors, revealing a spoken Hebrew which parallels in places phenomena from modern colloquial Hebrew despite the two sharing no direct relation.

A letter consisting of four slats of wood tied together with the other papyri was the only one that used the words "Nesi Israel" (the others used "Shimeon ben/bar Kosiba"). This letter is written in Aramaic and it addresses two subordinates, ordering them to confiscate some wheat from a man and deliver the man and the wheat safely to him, and threatens to severely punish them if they fail. The letter also warns that no one should give shelter to any man from Tekoa. This warning includes the description of the punishment; "Concerning every man of Tekoa who will be found at your place – the house in which they dwell will be burned and you [too] will be punished".

Another letter (P. Yadin 50) concerned the arrest of Eleazar bar Ḥitta: "Shimeon bar Kosiba, to Yehonathan bar Be'ayan, and Masabala bar Shimeon, [my order is] that you will send to me Eleazar, bar Ḥitta, immediately, before the Sabbath". Documents acquired later revealed that Eleazar bar Ḥitta was a wealthy land owner in Ein-Gedi who didn't cooperate with Bar Kokhba. It goes on to describe what is to be done with his property; wheat and fruit are to be confiscated, the herds should not trample the trees "and as for the spice fields, no one is to get anywhere near it". The force with which the order is given shows how valuable the spice fields in particular were.

Another letter (P. Yadin 57) is a request from Bar Kokhba to supply the four species for the feast of Sukkot. The request is unusual, in that it is not addressed to his subordinates Yehonathan and Masabala, but to a third party, whose name is Yehuda bar Menashe. Because of the nature of the request, it has been interpreted as indicating distrust between Bar Kokhba and his subordinates.

A second letter (P. Yadin 52) concerned the same request of the four species, except this letter was written in Greek by a man called Soumaios, who was probably a Nabataean. "The letter is written in Greek as we have no one who knows Hebrew [or Aramaic]." This passage of the letter is of particular interest to scholars because it might indicate that non-Jews were a part of the Bar Kokhba Revolt, a fact that is also supported by the third century historian Dio Cassius, "And many outside nations were joining for the eagerness of gain". Or this could be a case in which no Jewish soldiers at this camp could write in Aramaic or Hebrew. This letter is not from Bar Kohkba but someone else who was writing to Yehonathan and Masabala. The person that wrote this letter is telling Yehonathan and Masabala that he is sending to them a messenger, and they are to send him back with palm branches and citron.

== Second exploration in 1961 ==
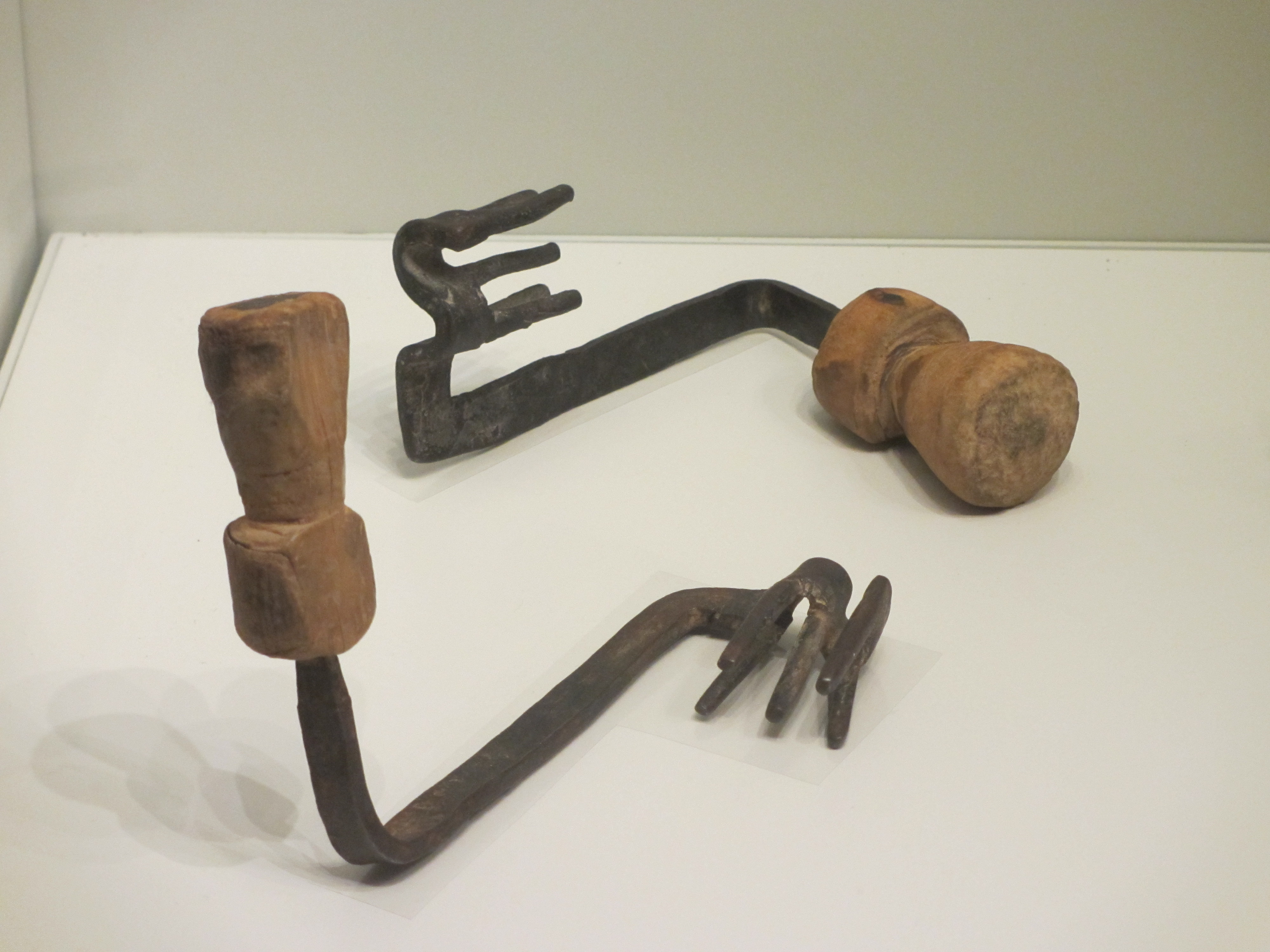
Iron Age house keys found in Cave of Letters, Nahal Hever Canyon, Israel Museum, Jerusalem

In the second dig of the Cave of Letters, in a previously explored section of the cave, a well concealed crevice was discovered and in it a number of artifacts were found in a palm basket. These included an empty jewelry box, with a barrel shaped top and a flat bottom that was painted with yellow and red dots, some wooden plates and bowls, and an iron sickle. A pair of woman's sandals was also discovered, one of which was examined by an orthopedic specialist, who judged from the shape of it that the wearer of the sandal must have had a limp. Among the rest of the artifacts discovered were three knives, a frying pan, and a mirror similar to one found the previous year.

Under the basket, a bag held another bundle of documents, that would be known as Babatha’s cache. Still below there was a reed tube and six papyri, next to a leather pouch.

More artifacts were found elsewhere in the cave, including a second coin from the "Freedom of Jerusalem" period, two cooking pots, and a fowling net. The net measured 6.5 by 10 meters, with 4 centimetres (1.6 in) wide holes and a drawstring. Another cache was found in a hidden cleft, and in it were six iron keys, known in the Mishnah as "knee" or "elbow" keys, so named because they were shaped to fit through a small opening through the gate and engage the lock on the other side of the gate. The next discovery was of a set of one large glass bowl, and two smaller glass plates, in a palm fiber wrap, as well as two willow baskets and a strip of papyrus with verses 7 and 8 of chapter 20 of the Book of Numbers written in Hebrew - these two verses concern God's commandment to Moses and Ahron to speak to the desert rock so that it produce water.

The documents discovered to be part of the leather pouch dealt with various land transactions, some being dealt with by Bar-Kokhba's administrators during his first year as Nasi Israel. Another one described the terms in which the lands of En-gedi would be leased and included signatures of four of the leases.

=== The Babatha cache ===
The Babatha (or Babata) cache contains 35 documents covering a wide range of legal issues, dated between 94 and 132.

One was the deed of a palm grove which contained details of the water rights in it, "one every Sunday, every year, for ever". This particular document goes on to reassure the buyer of his rights and that of his heirs, and contains many legal terms of the time.

The cache also contained Babatha's marriage contract to her second husband Yehudah, as well as a document describing the conditions of a loan of 300 silver denarii to him by her. This document stated that if he refuses payment he would be liable under the law to pay her double the amount and damages. There is also a document where she petitions to become sole guardian of her son Yeshua, orphaned when her first husband died.

Other documents were found concerning the splitting of her husband Yehudah's property between various family members, including his daughter from his other marriage. Other documents were found concerning her second husband's property; the most interesting one is a summons by her, to her husband's other wife. This document is dated 7 July 131, and states, "In the presence of the witness ... Babata [daughter of] Shimeon of Maoza summoned Maryam [Mariame] daughter of Be'ayan of En-gedi to come forth together with her and Haterius Nepos the governor wherever he may be present; since you [Miriam] plundered everything in the house of Yehudah son of Eleazar Khthusion, my husband and yours..."

The last document is dated 19 August 132, the year of the Bar Kohkba Revolt. In this document she uses a form of address, 'Yeshua son of Yeshua my orphan son', that suggests that her previous petition for guardianship of her son might have failed. The document is a receipt, "from you on account of aliments and clothing of the said Yeshua my son, six denarii of silver from the first of the month of Panemos [June] of the said 27th year [of Provincia Arabia] until the thirtieth of Gorpiaios [August] three full months".
