= Wadi Murabba'at =

Archaeological site in the West Bank

Coordinates: 31°35′18″N 35°22′22″E

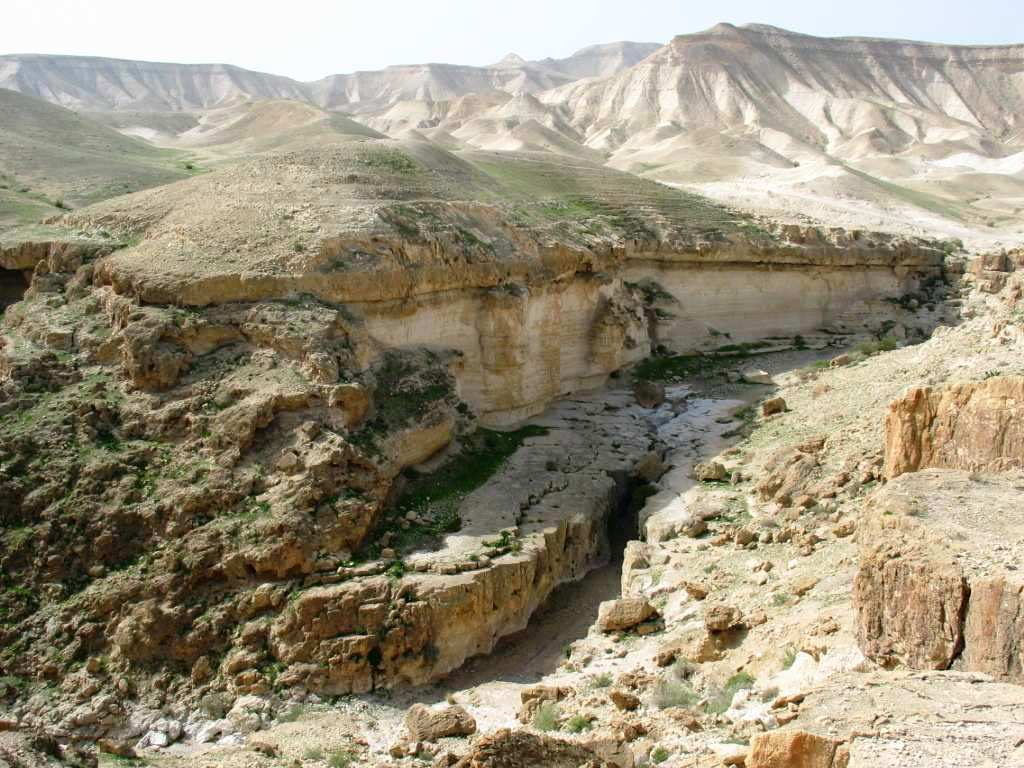
Nahal Darga

Wadi Murabba'at, also known as Nahal Darga (Hebrew: נחל דרגה), is a ravine in the West Bank, cut by a seasonal stream which runs from the Judean Desert east of Bethlehem past the Herodium down to the Dead Sea 18 km south of Khirbet Qumran. It was here that Jewish fighters hid out in caves during the Bar Kochba revolt, leaving behind documents that include some letters signed by Simon Bar Kochba.

== Discovery and analysis of the caves ==
When the Ta'amireh Bedouin tribe that discovered the first cave at Qumran learned how valuable the texts they found were, they began to search for other sites that might contain more scrolls. This led in the autumn of 1951 to the discovery of caves high up in the near vertical rock face of Wadi Murabba'at. With the confirmation that the new texts had come from Murabba'at, Gerald Lankester Harding and Roland de Vaux commenced official excavations there in January 1952. Four caves were examined.

The remains discovered there reflected habitation, usually temporary, during the Chalcolithic period, the Bronze Age (including a Hyksos scarab), the Iron Age, and the Roman period. The latter is represented by a large amount of pottery and numerous weapons, including the blade of a pilum (a Roman javelin). Numerous spindle whorls were found, suggesting the presence of women working with yarn, and a coin hoard which included 149 Nabataean drachmas, 51 imperial dinars and 33 tetradrachmas of Trajan. Most of the coins were minted in Antioch. The spindle whorls and the coins suggest a lengthy encampment by bar Kochba forces in the area, while the Roman objects point to the settlement being overrun by Roman forces.

The Murabba'at area was surveyed by Pessah Bar-Adon in 1968, leading to the discovery of a fifth cave. In 1993 Hanan Eshel and Z. Greenhut discovered a cemetery which resembles that at Qumran.

== Textual materials ==
From the Roman period there is an inventory of about 120 documents which cover the decades leading up to the Bar Kochba revolt. Many of these are legal documents including deeds of land sale, marriage contracts, a debt acknowledgement and a writ of divorce. Fragments of biblical texts including Genesis, Deuteronomy and Isaiah were found, as well as the remains of a Hebrew Minor Prophets scroll.

=== List of manuscripts from Cave 1 ===
Fragment or Scroll Identifier	Fragment or Scroll Name	Alternative Identifier	English Bible Association	Language	Date/Script	Description	Reference
Wadi Murabba'at Cave 1
Mur1	Pentateuch?	Mur1	Genesis 32:4–5, 30, 33–33:1; 34:5–7, 30–35:1, 4–7 Exodus 6:5–11	Hebrew	Roman	Parts of Genesis, Exodus, and Numbers.	
MurDeut	Deuteronomy	Mur2	Deuteronomy 10:1–3	Hebrew	20–84 CE Roman		
MurIsa	Isaiah	Mur3		Hebrew	Roman		
MurPhyl	Phylacteries	Mur4	Contains Exodus 13:1–16 Deuteronomy 11:13–21; 6:4–9	Hebrew	Roman		
MurMez	Mezuzah	Mur5	Contains Exodus 13:1–16 Deuteronomy 11:13–21; 6:4–9	Hebrew	Roman		
Mur6	Unidentified literary text	Mur6					
MurXII	Minor Prophets	Mur88		Hebrew	Roman (Square script)		

=== Letter from Simon Bar Kochba ===
The following letter, translated by John Allegro, is addressed to Joshua ben Galgola, who was the military commander of the Herodium fortress, which lay between Wadi Murabba'at and Jerusalem. The letter provides Bar Kochba's real name.

Simon ben Kosebah to Joshua ben Galgola and the men of thy company; greetings. I call heaven to bear witness against me: if any one of the Galileans whom you have protected (or, delivered) cause trou[ble], I shall put fetters on your feet as I did to Ben Aphlul – Simon ben Kosebah (...)
