= Hanan Eshel =

Israeli archaeologist and historian (1958–2010)

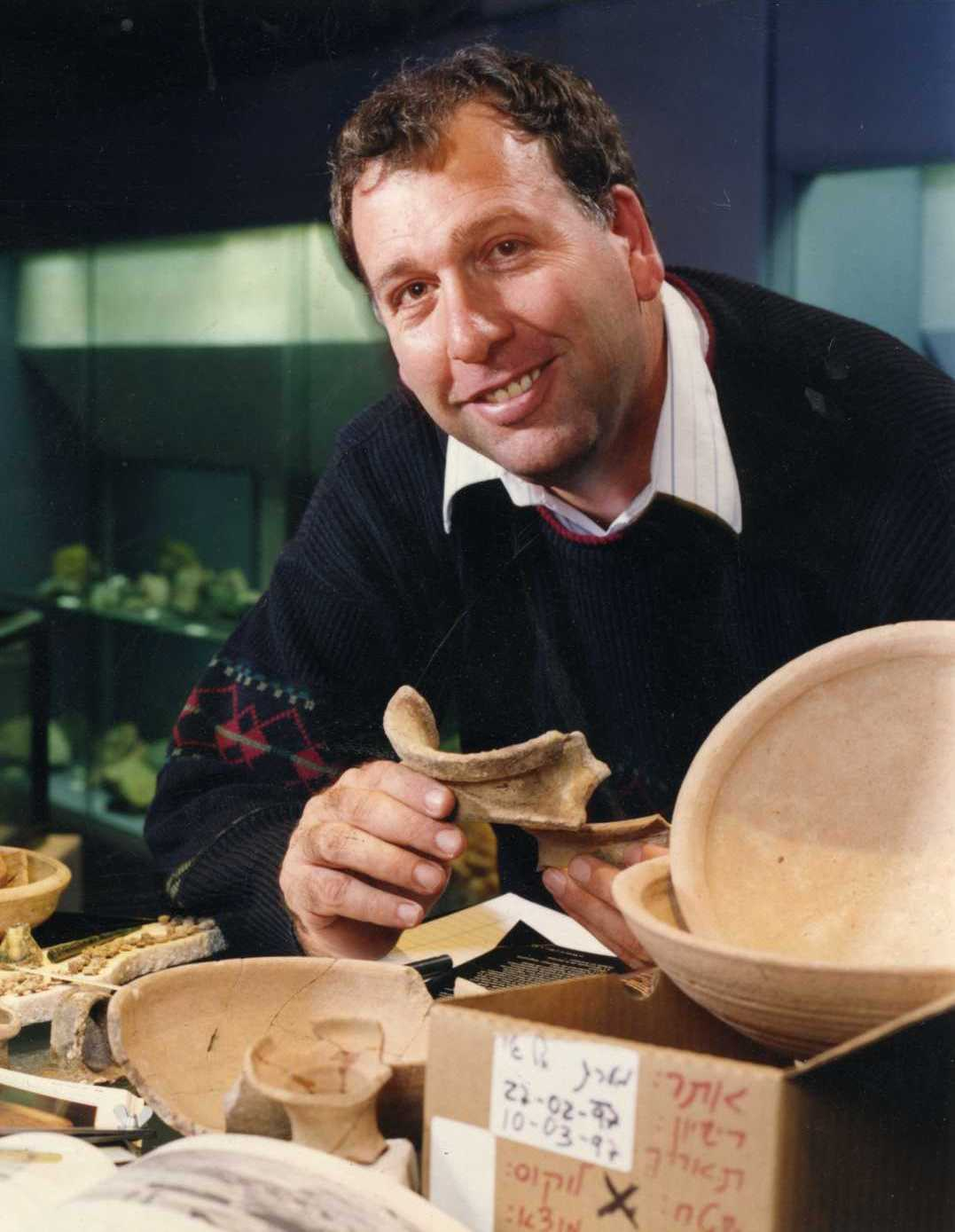
Hanan Eshel

Hanan Eshel (Hebrew: חנן אשל; born at Rehovot on July 25, 1958, died April 8, 2010) was an Israeli archaeologist and historian, well known in the field of Dead Sea Scrolls studies, although he did research in the Hasmonean and Bar Kokhba periods as well. With Magen Broshi he discovered a number of residential caves in the near vicinity of Qumran and co-published a number of historically significant documents from Qumran.

== Academic progress ==
Eshel received his academic training at the Hebrew University of Jerusalem, completing his B.A. at the Institute of Archaeology in 1984, his M.A. 1985–1988 and his Ph.D. in 1993, both in the Jewish History Department. His PhD was on the origins of Samaritanism. While working on his PhD he started teaching in the department of Land of Israel Studies and Archeology at Bar-Ilan University. That was in 1990. He would remain at Bar-Ilan for the next twenty years, receiving an appointment as an associate professor in 1999 and serving as head of the department between 2002 and 2004.

== The archaeologist ==
As an archaeologist Eshel worked in 1986 and 1993 at a number of caves in the Judaean Desert where refugees hid from the Romans during the Bar Kokhba revolt. In one cave near Jericho he found 19 business documents in Hebrew, Aramaic and Greek. From 1995 to 1999 he co-directed five seasons at Tel Yatir near Arad. Eshel carried out three seasons at Qumran with Magen Broshi in 1996, 2001 and 2002, discovering amongst other things the remains of a series of caves inhabited at the time of use of the Qumran settlement.

In 2004 Eshel was shown fragments of ancient Hebrew texts reportedly being offered on the black market. This was apparently an attempt by the holder to estimate the worth of his find. The following year Eshel found that the text had not been sold and so with money from Bar-Ilan University he purchased the material and turned it over to the Israel Antiquities Authority. He believed the fragments, from the book of Leviticus, originated in one of the caves in Nahal Arugot used as refuges from the Romans in the second century.

== Publications ==
Eshel edited numerous books and published over 200 articles. His complete publications list includes fifteen books and monographs, 230 articles and reviews, and fifteen encyclopedia entries.

His articles include:

- "A Qumran Composition Containing Part of Ps. 154 and a Prayer for the Welfare of King Jonathan and his Kingdom", with Ada Yardeni and Esther Eshel, in Israel Exploration Journal, 42.3/4 (1992), pp. 199–229.
- "Residential Caves at Qumran", with Magen Broshi, in Dead Sea Discoveries, 6 (1999), pp. 266–273.
- "Aqueducts in the Copper Scroll", in Copper Scroll Studies, ed. George J. Brooke and Philip R. Davies, (London: Sheffield Academic Press, 2002), pp. 92–107.
- 'A Document from "Year 4 of the Destruction of the House of Israel"', with Ada Yardeni and Esther Eshel, in Dead Sea Discoveries, 18 (2011), pp. 1–28.

His books include:

- Refuge Caves of the Bar Kokhba Revolt (two volumes) written with Roi Porat (Israel Exploration Society 1998).
- The Dead Sea scrolls and the Hasmonean state. (Grand Rapids/Mich: William B. Eerdmans Pub; Jerusalem: Yad Ben-Zvi Press 2008). ISBN 978-0-8028-6285-3
- Qumran: Scrolls, Caves, History. (Jerusalem: Carta 2009). ISBN 978-965-220-757-9

Video recordings of his lectures include:

- "The New Testament in the Light of the Dead Sea Scrolls" Jerusalem Perspective (2006).

== Personal life ==
During his military service (1977–1980), Hanan Eshel met and married his wife, Esther ("Esti") Eshel, an epigraphist, with whom he wrote a number of academic articles. Eshel is survived by his wife, a son, Avshalom, a daughter, Michal, and three grandchildren.
