= Nahal Hever =

Stream in the Judean Desert

Coordinates: 31°24′47.42″N 35°21′57.21″E

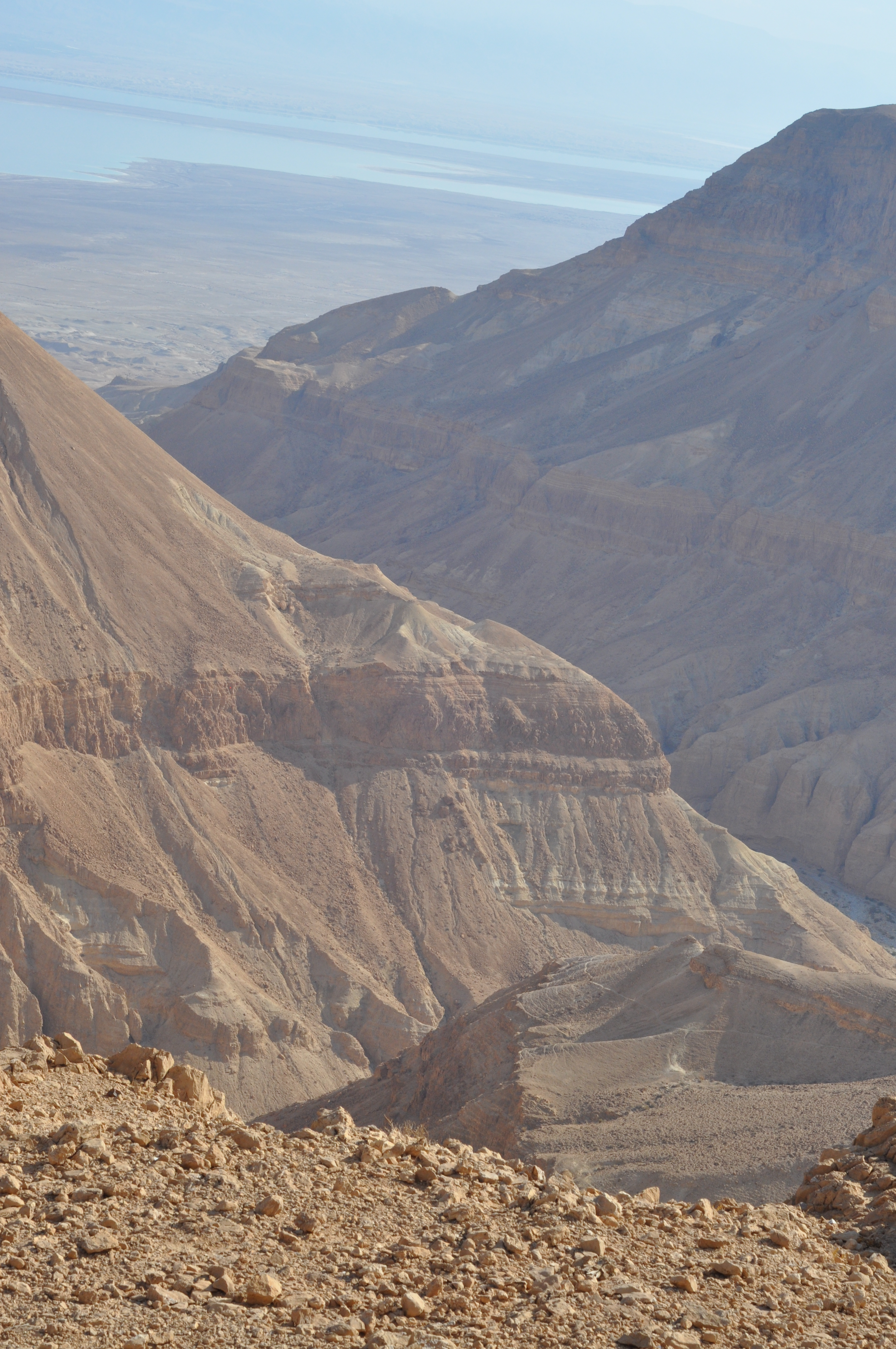
View of Nahal Hever

Nahal Hever (Hebrew: נחל חבר) or Wadi al-Khabat (Arabic) is an intermittent stream (wadi) in the Judean Desert, that flows through the West Bank and Israel, from the area of Yatta to the Dead Sea. The Hebrew name is derived from "Hevron", the Hebrew name of the city of Hebron. The stream has a few waterfalls, the tallest one having a drop of over 140 metres (460 ft).

== The caves ==
At the head of the stream are two caves, the "Cave of Letters" (מערת האיגרות), and, further up, the "Cave of Horror" (מערת האימה) in which twenty four human skeletons were found. The skeletons of Babatha, whose personal documents were famously discovered in the Cave of Letters, and of her son are, presumably, among them. The findings have been regarded as archaeological evidence of the Bar Kokhba revolt (132–136). The sites were discovered in 1953 and investigated in 1960 and 1961 by Yigael Yadin. In 1999 and 2000 it was excavated by Richard Freund of the University of Hartford.

== Biblical manuscripts ==
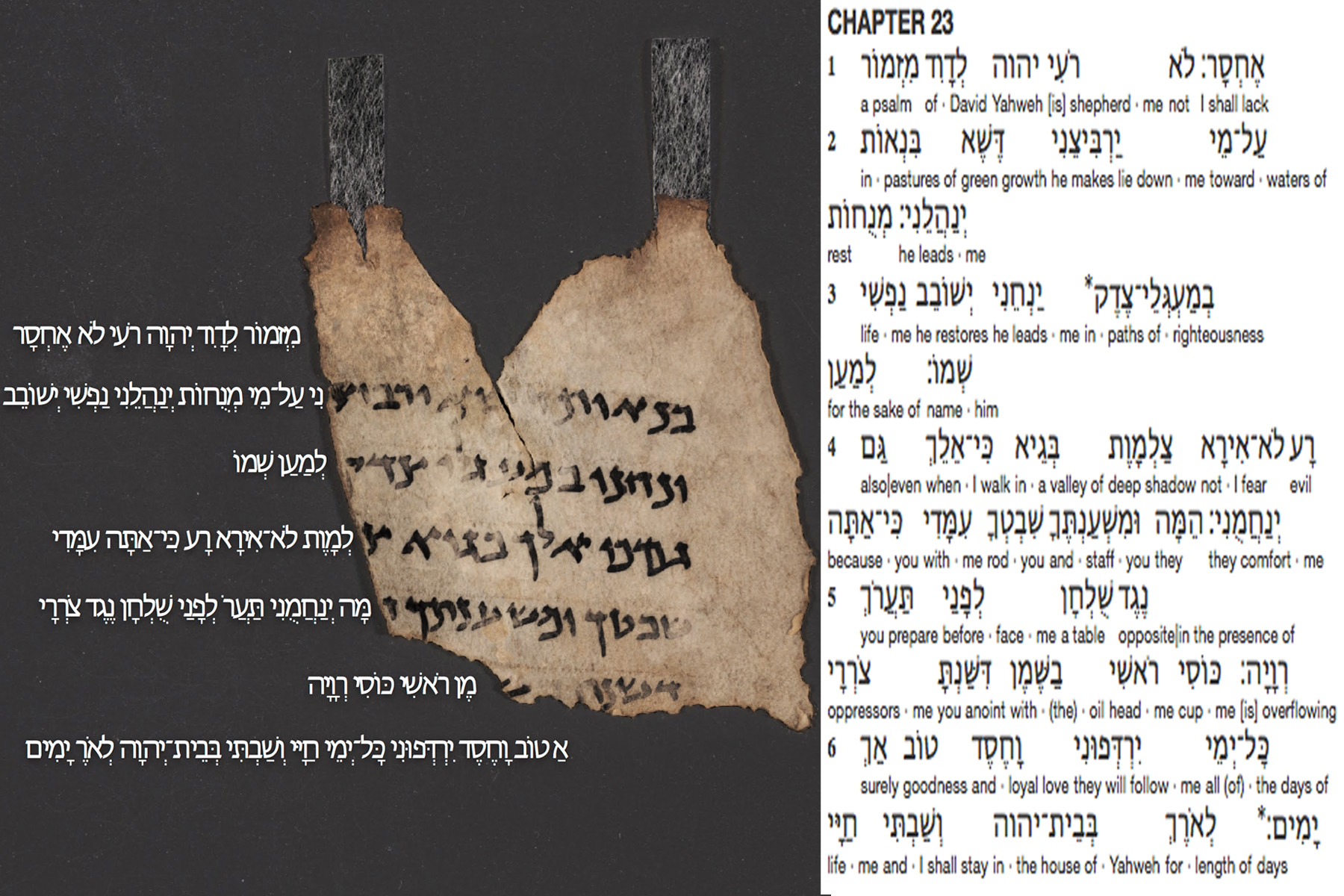
Photo of a fragment of one of the biblical manuscripts found in the Cave of Letters at Nahal Hever

Several fragments of ancient biblical manuscripts were found at Nahal Hever. They include portions of the Book of Numbers and Psalms. They were housed, as of 1999, at the Rockefeller Museum. Some other biblical manuscript fragments have also been discovered, such as from Deuteronomy.

== See also ==
- Greek Minor Prophets Scroll from Nahal Hever
- Archaeology of Israel
