= Beersheba Settlement =

Ancient Jewish settlement

- Created: 1st century CE
- Period/culture: Second Temple Period
- Discovered: Beersheba, Negev Desert, Israel
- Present location: Beersheba
- Culture: Jewish

The Beersheba settlement is an ancient Jewish site in the Negev Desert.

== The Site ==
The settlement dates back to the Second Temple period and has been discovered in Beersheba.

The visible remains of the ancient site cover an area of about two dunams. They include several structures and installations:

- Foundations of a large watchtower
- Baking facilities
- Ancient pits that were used for trash
- Underground system and storage rooms that were used by Jewish Rebels during the Roman wars.
- A Jewish ritual bath. (Called "Mikveh" in Hebrew)
- Copper Coins from Roman Judaea

Archaeologists have found that some of the structures show signs that the settlement was experiencing some kind of crisis. Probably during The Jewish-Roman Wars.

It most likely was destroyed after the Bar Kokhba Revolt.

== Specific findings ==
Aside from the structures mentioned above, several Jewish limestone vessels were found.

One of the most important findings however, was an ancient oil lamp sherd decorated with a menorah.

== See also ==
- Archaeology of Israel
- Bar Kokhba Revolt Coinage
- Bar Kokhba Weights
- Judean provisional government
- Tel Be'er Sheva
