= Bar Kokhba (disambiguation) =

Bar Kokhba (Hebrew: בר כוכבא, Son of Kokhba) (also Bar Kochba, Bar Kochva, Bar Cochva) is a name of Simon bar Kokhba, the leader of the Bar Kokhba revolt, the second (sometimes counted as the third) of the Jewish–Roman wars.

Bar Kokhba may also refer to:

- Bar Kokhba (album), a 1996 album by John Zorn
  - Bar Kokhba Sextet, a musical group created by John Zorn
- Bar Kokhba (play) (1883/1885), a play by Abraham Goldfaden
- TuS Bar Kochba Nürnberg, a football club in Germany
- Bar Kochba Berlin, a former football club in Germany
- Bezalel Bar-Kochba (born 1941), an Israeli historian
- Simon bar Kokhba (sculpture), a bronze sculpture
