= Beersheba fragment with menorah depiction =

Jewish oil lamp

Oil Lamp Fragment
- Created: 1st century CE
- Period/culture: Second Temple Period
- Discovered: Beersheba, Israel
- Present location: Israel Antiquities Authority
- Culture: Jewish

The 'Oil Lamp Fragment' is an old remnant of a Jewish oil lamp.

== Discovery ==
The fragment of an ancient jewish oil lamp was found unearthed the Beersheba Settlement in the Negev Desert. It was discovered during excavations beneath destroyed buildings that date back to the time of the Judaea Province. The settlement and the oil lamp itself were destroyed during the Jewish-Roman wars.

== The fragment ==
The oil lamp fragment decorated with a nine-branched menorah.

According to the Israel Antiquities Authority

This is probably one of the earliest artistic depictions of a nine-branched menorah yet discovered. Of the few oil lamps discovered which depict menorahs, none of them have the traditional seven branches. This is because of a ruling in the Babylonian Talmud which stated that only the temple menorah itself could have seven branches. Because of this, lamps used in domestic settings commonly had between eight to eleven branches.

== See also ==
- Bar Kokhba Revolt
- Bar Kokhba Revolt coinage
- Simon bar Kokhba
- Judaea Province
- Archaeology of Israel
