= Kallal Railway Station =

Railway station in Tamil Nadu, India

Kallal railway station

General information
- Location: Karaikudi Road, Kallal, Tamil Nadu; India
- Coordinates: 8.25426°N 78.4717°E
- Elevation: 135 metres (443 ft)
- System: Indian Railways station
- Owner: Indian Railways
- Operator: Madurai railway division
- Line: Karaikudi–Manamadurai line
- Platforms: 3
- Tracks: 2
- Connections: bus stop

Construction
- Structure type: Standard (on ground station)
- Parking: Yes
- Cycle facilities: Yes

Other information
- Status: Functioning
- Station code: KAL
- Fare zone: Southern Railway

History
- Rebuilt: 2008
- Former names: Madras and Southern Mahratta Railway
Location

Kallal railway station (station code:KAL) is an HG-2 category Indian railway station in Madurai railway division of Southern Railway zone. It serves Kallal, located in southern suburb of Karaikudi Municipal Corporation in Sivaganga district of the Indian state of Tamil Nadu.

== List of Trains stopping in Kallal Railway Station ==
- Chennai Egmore – Rameswaram Express (16751): Arrives at 05:36, departs at 05:37
- Virudhunagar / Karaikkudi Passenger (56834): Arrives at 08:44, departs at 08:45
- Tiruchchirappalli – Rameswaram Express (16849): Arrives at 08:54, departs at 08:55
- Rameswaram – Tiruchchirappalli Express (16850): Arrives at 17:17, departs at 17:18
- Karaikkudi – Virudhunagar Passenger (56833): Halts in the evening (approx. 18:26)
- Rameswaram – Chennai Egmore Express (16752): Arrives at 20:31, departs at 20:32
