= TuS Bar Kochba Nürnberg =

German football club

- Full name: TuS Bar Kochba Nürnberg e.V.
- Founded: 1913
Home colours	Away colours

TuS Bar Kochba, is a German association football club based in Nürnberg, Bavaria. It was established in 1913 as a social-sport club for the Jewish community in Nürnberg.

The club only fields a side in the senior A-league of the Bavarian Football Association, a competition made up of older players.

== History ==
TuS Bar Kochba was founded in 1913 as the "Jewish Gymnastics and Sports Club Nuremberg". It was named after Simon bar Kokhba, a Jewish rebel. In 1939, the Nazi authorities dissolved the association. It was refounded in 1966 by Arno Hamburger and Paul Baruch. It is no longer exclusively Jewish.

A Berlin chapter, the Bar Kochba Berlin, was also formed.

== See also ==
- Football in Germany
- List of football clubs in Germany
