= Scopus stone vessels cave =

Archaeological site near Jerusalem

Underground quarry and stone vessel production complex on Mount Scopus
- מערת כלי האבן (Hebrew)
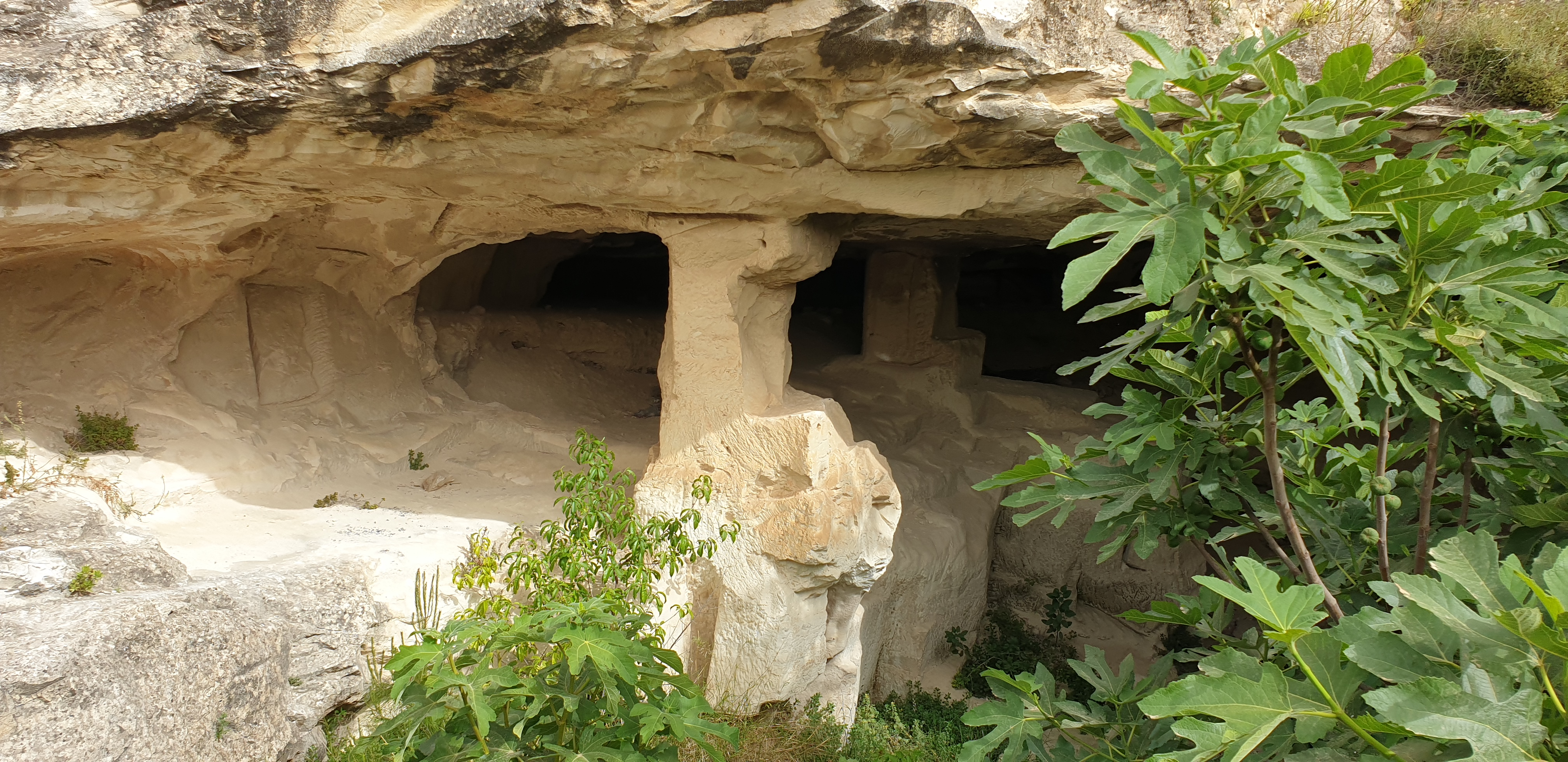
- The entrance to the upper cave (Cave II) viewed from the courtyard

- Location within Jerusalem
- 31°47′26.2″N 35°15′14.1″E
- Type: Quarry, workshops
- Periods: Second Temple period: 1st century until 70 CE
- Cultures: Second Temple Judaism
- Location: Jerusalem
- Grid position: Israel Ref. 210166/670117

Site notes
- Material: Senonian limestone
- Condition: Ruined
- Owner: Public
- Public access: Yes

The cave complex on the east slope of Mount Scopus was used for quarrying and producing stone vessels. It was used in the 1st century BCE and the 1st century CE. The archaeological site was discovered in 1999 during the construction of a road and subsequently investigated by archaeologists.

== Location ==
The cave system is located on the eastern slope of Mount Scopus. A road from Jerusalem to Ma'ale Adummim was built through the area in 1999.

== Background ==
The production of stone vessels in the southern Levant became more common the late 1st century BCE as a result of the increasing adherence to Jewish purity laws. In contrast to pottery vessels, under halakha stone vessels did not become impure through use for food and drink. The quarry and workshops on the east slope of Mount Scopus are amongst a small number of known production sites of stone vessels.

== Description ==
The complex consists of two caves around an ovoid-shaped courtyard. Each cave consists of several chambers.

=== Lower cave (Cave I) ===
The lower cave covers an area of 4000 sqm; the ceiling is 4m high near the entrance and 2m high at its rear. As the cave was quarried out, pillars were left in even distances to prevent the collapse of the ceiling. This divided the cave into large halls and chambers. Along the walls were stone shelves which held oil lamps for the illumination of the inner and darker parts of the cave. Near the cave's entrance are four small rock-hewn rooms, which probably served as workshops.

=== Upper cave (Cave II) ===
The upper cave is smaller than the lower cave and cut at a higher level than it. It is ovoid-shaped, 24m in length and 17m wide, covering an area of 1000 sqm, There were pillars carved out and left standing here as well.

== Archaeology ==
The cave was discovered in the summer of 1999. During the construction of a new road connecting Jerusalem to Ma'ale Adumim, a bulldozer created an opening in the cave ceiling, exposing a huge underground complex carved in chalkstone. David Amit, Jon Seligman, and Irina Zilberbod of the Israel Antiquities Authority led an excavation at the site in July and August of that year.

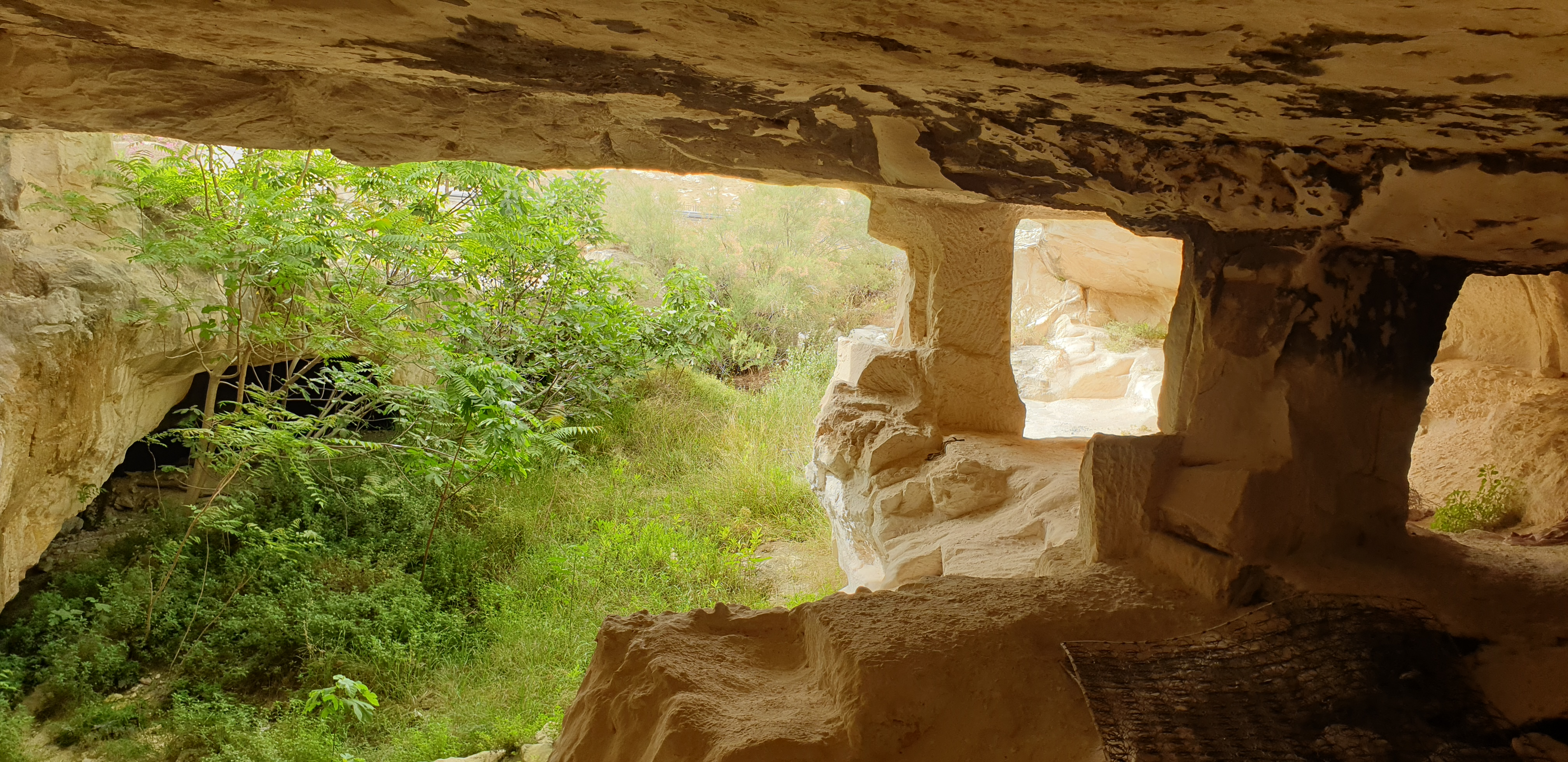
Pillars near the entrance of the upper cave (Cave II), seen from inside the cave

Dating evidence consists of a small number of coins found at the site and pottery (bowls, cooking wares and storage jars, lamps). Collectively they indicate that the main period of activity at the site began in the first century BCE and ended in the 1st century CE around the time of the First Jewish Revolt in 70 CE. Some pottery found in the upper cave (Cave II) was dated to between 70 CE and 132 CE, which the archaeologists investigating the site suggested indicated that the complex continued in use after the First Jewish Revolt.

Of the coins, two were found in the upper cave (Cave II) and two in the lower (Cave I). The earliest was produced in 54 CE, during the rule of Roman procurator Antonius Felix. The others were produced during the First Jewish Revolt of 67 to 70 CE.

A large number of discarded stone vessels were discovered near the entrances to the caves. They had been discarded as they were damaged during production (items discarded during production are referred to as 'wasters'). The remains of broken ossuaries for storing human remains were also found. Though they are a common feature of tombs from the period in which the complex was active, the discovery was the first evidence of an ossuary production site. The archaeologists hypothesised that an ossuary discovered in a burial at Bethphage in 1910, could have been produced at the Scopus workshops. The inscription lists 23 names which may be a list of workers and their wages.

== See also ==
- Jewish purity laws
- Stone vessels in ancient Judaea
