= Stone vessels in ancient Judaea =

Containers used by Jews during the Second Temple Period

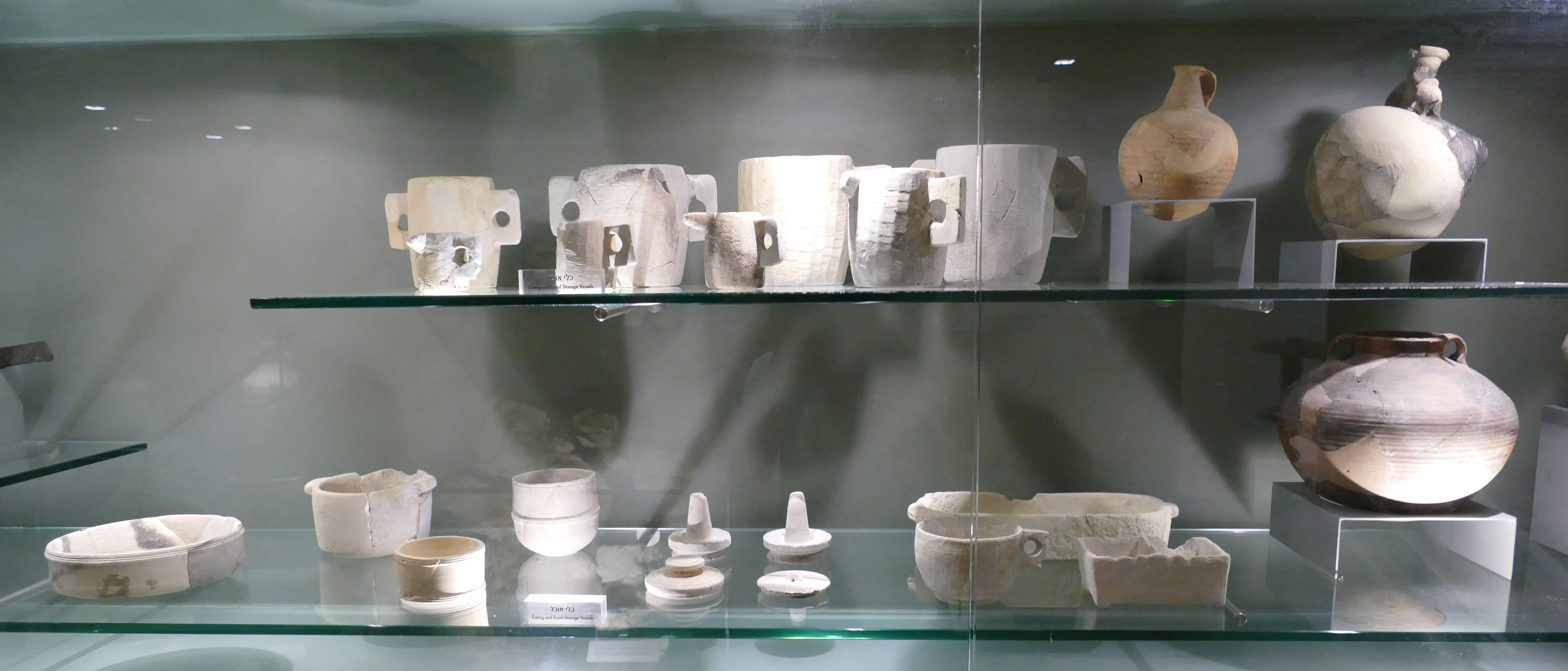
Stone vessels on display in the Burnt House in Jerusalem

The use of stone vessels made from soft limestone/chalkstone among Jews during the Second Temple period and beyond was widespread across Judea, Galilee and the Golan Heights. Initially appearing in the early 1st century BCE, these vessels continued to be utilized in each region for differing lengths of time.

In Judea, their use was traditionally thought to have ceased after the destruction of the Second Temple in 70 CE, but discoveries in places like Jericho and Shuafat indicate their continued use until the Bar Kokhba revolt. Conversely, in the Galilee, their use persisted until the 4th century CE. These stone vessels were found in all regions densely populated by Jews, often in settlements featuring ritual baths, the two findings serving as a significant indicator of Jewish presence from the early Roman period through the Byzantine period.

Stone vessels held particular religious significance in Jewish ritual law due to their imperviousness to impurity, contrasting with pottery vessels that could become impure and would need to be discarded or broken. This property likely contributed to their popularity during a period when adherence to purity laws was paramount in Jewish culture.

The remains of at least five workshops dedicated to producing stone vessels from the Second Temple period have been identified as of 2021. These workshops were located near Jerusalem (Mount Scopus and Hizma), in the Galilee (Einot Amitai and Reineh), and in the Golan Heights (Wadi es-Sufera). Evidence suggests the presence of more workshops within Jerusalem itself, including Jabal Mukaber, Tel el-Ful, and Bethlehem of Galilee. These workshops operated within caves where craftsmen quarried chalk (soft limestone) and crafted stone vessels using manual techniques or lathes.

== Role and importance ==
Stone vessels made of soft limestone, were used by Jews throughout Judaea during the Second Temple period and beyond. They first appeared during the early 1st century BCE and were gradually phased out during the following centuries. Their use in Judea was originally thought to have ceased after the destruction of the Second Temple, though through their discovery in such Jewish sites as those in Jericho and Shuafat, it became clear that their use continued until the Bar Kokhba revolt. By contrast, in the Galilee they continued to be used until the 4th century CE at least. Stone vessels were found in all the regions that were densely populated by Jews according to historical sources, and in all settlements which also contained ritual baths. As a result, Stone vessels, along with the presence of mikvehs and a lack of imported vessels, serve as a clear indicator for Jewish sites in Judaea from the early Roman period through the Byzantine period.

=== Historical context ===
It is widely accepted that during the Second Temple period, and especially after the founding of the Hasmonean state in Judaea, there began a dramatic increase in the awareness and practice of the laws of purity among Jews. A testimony to this is the sudden appearance and spread of such elements of material culture as mikvehs and stone vessels. This is most probably due to the centrality of the Temple around which the laws of purity revolved, though some have suggested that there was a political aspect to this as well.

In Judea, the use of stone vessels continued even after the destruction of the temple, and finally ceased altogether with the crushing of the Bar Kokhba revolt in 136 CE, though in the galilee there is evidence for their continuous use through the 4th century CE.

=== Religious context ===
According to early interpretations of biblical law, the susceptibility of vessels to impurity is, among other things, based on the material that composed them. The biblical book of Leviticus lists the substances which become impure when they come in contact with a dead animal:

When one of them dies and falls on something, that article, whatever its use, will be unclean, whether it is made of wood, cloth, hide or sackcloth. Put it in water; it will be unclean till evening, and then it will be clean.

The Book of Numbers further lists other materials, including metals, which become impure when they come in contact with human remains:

Purify every garment as well as everything made of leather, goat hair or wood. Then Eleazar the priest said to the soldiers who had gone into battle, “This is what is required by the law that the Lord gave Moses: Gold, silver, bronze, iron, tin, lead, and anything else that can withstand fire must be put through the fire, and then it will be clean. But it must also be purified with the water of cleansing. And whatever cannot withstand fire must be put through that water.

It is based on these lists that it was deduced during the Second Temple period that vessels made of these materials, namely wood, cloth, leather, sackcloth, pottery, bone and metal, are all susceptible to impurity, while vessels made of material not mentioned by the bible in this context, such as stone, could not become impure. In addition to the above, according to biblical law, clay vessels that come in contact with animal remains become impure and cannot return to their former purity, therefore they must be broken:

If one of them falls into a clay pot, everything in it will be unclean, and you must break the pot. Any food you are allowed to eat that has come into contact with water from any such pot is unclean, and any liquid that is drunk from such a pot is unclean. Anything that one of their carcasses falls on becomes unclean; an oven or cooking pot must be broken up. They are unclean, and you are to regard them as unclean.

As opposed to pottery vessels which had to be broken or discarded when becoming impure, stone vessels remained pure and could be used further. It is most probably due to this property, and their durability, that their use became increasingly popular during the Second Temple period.

Although some scholars have suggested other reasons for the popularity of stone vessels during this period, such as fashionability or the increase of stone used in Jerusalem, the sources of the period provide support for purity being the main reason for their popularity. Early Tannaitic sources discuss stone vessels extensively as insusceptible of impurity and the book of John mentions stone water jugs "for the Jewish rites of purification. In addition to this, given the durability of stoneware its use became popular and widespread during the 1st century BCE when the observation of the laws of purity were of utmost importance to the Jewish population.

== Materials and methods of production ==
The vast majority of stone vessels of the Second Temple period were made of chalk, which was the easiest to carve, though hard and medium hard limestone, basalt, dolomite, marble and bituminous limestone were also used on occasion. The vessels made from the harder types of stone predated those made of chalk, required their own special methods of production, and were probably carved by stone masons.

The main assemblage of stone vessels are classified by three main production techniques: vessels carved by hand, vessels turned on a small lathe and vessels turned on a large-scaled lathe.

=== Vessels carved by hand ===
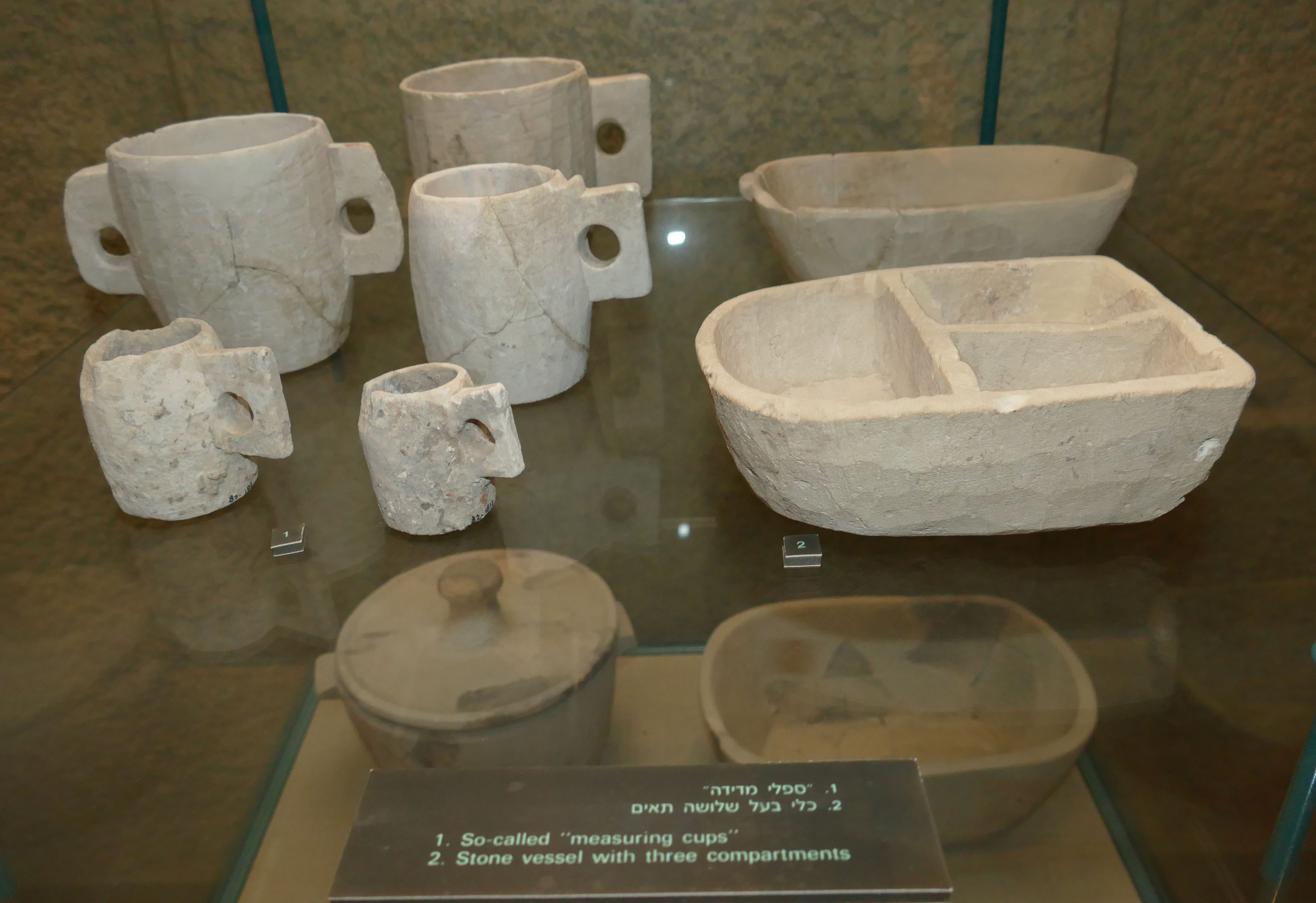
Hand carved vessels on display at the Herodian Quarter in Jerusalem

The category of vessels carved by hand includes vessels shaped and hollowed out manually with a hammer and chisel or blade, though those from the Galilee had a hand-cut exterior with an inside hollowed out by lathe. By nature, vessels of this type, often display a faceted appearance, though some were further processed and had their rough exterior eliminated through polishing with an abrasive material. The majority of vessels of this type, often nicknamed "measuring cups" by scholars, have a rectangular vertical cross-section, a flat base, and one or two vertical rectangular handles with holes drilled into their center, with volumes ranging from about 20ml to about 1000ml. Despite their common identification with measuring cups, a study by Ronnie Reich has concluded that there is no correlation between their range of volumes and any known ancient measuring system, and so they appear to not have been used for measurements of any kind. In light of this it is suggested that the larger vessels were used for serving water or wine, while the smaller ones were used for serving oil. Other Vessels included in this category are small pitchers, bowls, trays, lids, and stoppers.

=== Small lathe-turned vessels ===
Vessels of this type were of small proportions, these included bowls of different forms and sizes, mugs from the Galilee, goblets on trumpet-shaped bases, and lids. Another type of lathe-turned vessel was the stopper which was manufactured exclusively for closing pottery vessels, seeing as a stone vessel of any significant capacity could not be made with a narrow opening. Some of these vessels were more elaborate and refined than those which had been hand carved, and included a distinct base, as opposed to the flat base of the hand carved type. Many of these vessels imitate the form of similar lathe-turned wooden utensils such as have been found in Magdala, Qumran, Masada, Ein Gedi, and several hiding complexes in the Judean hills and the Judean desert. It is assumed that the vessels of this type were used predominantly for serving and dining.

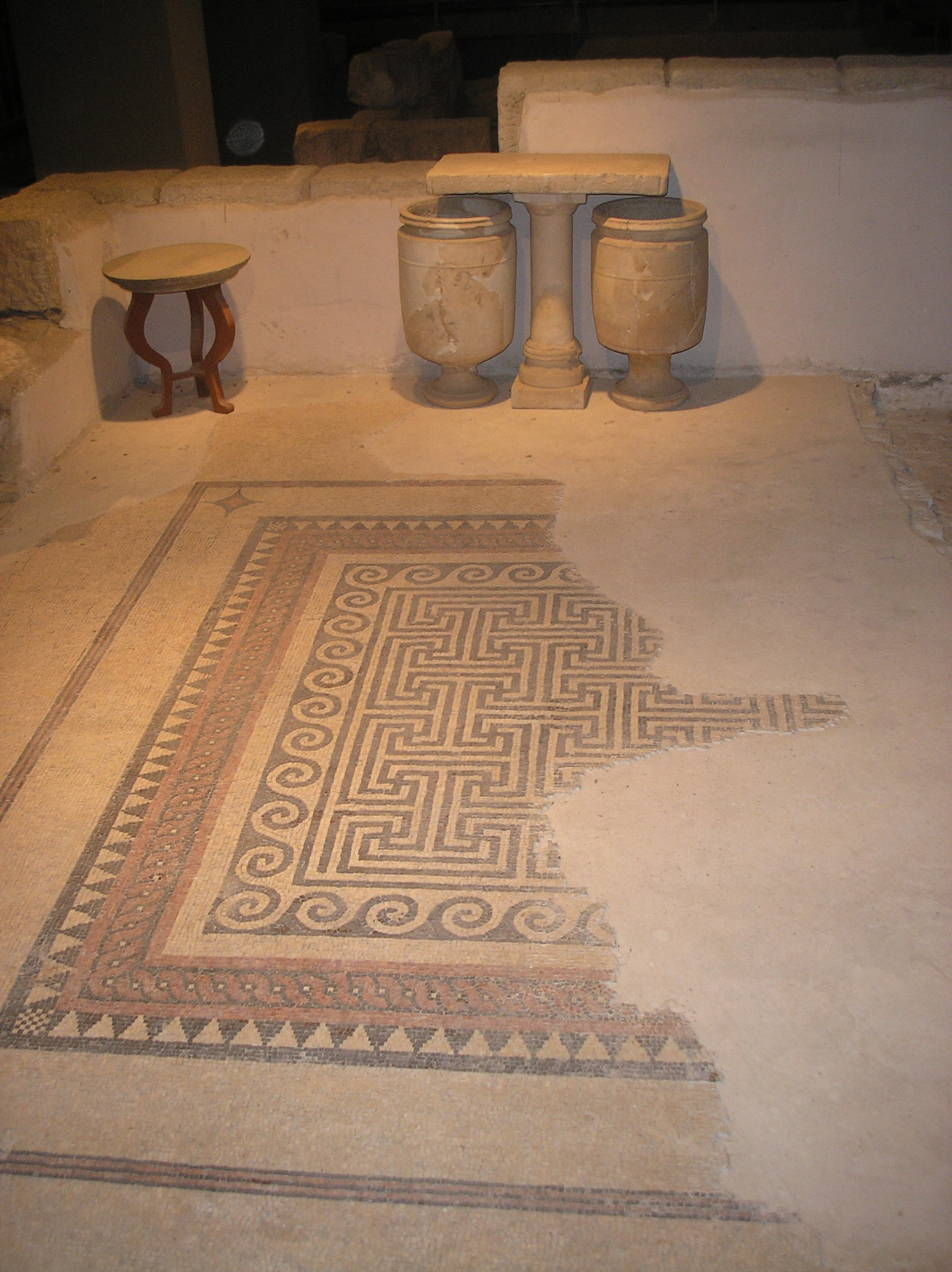
Two "qalals" or "kraters" in the Herodian Quarter of Jerusalem

=== Large lathe-turned vessels ===
These vessels were characteristically large and required a chalkstone block of considerable size. This block was externally shaped on a large lathe and could be hollowed out only by hand. The category under discussion mostly consists of "qalals" ("kraters"), "cooking pots" as well as various bowls, trays and lids. The qalals or kraters were large round chalice-shaped basins for storing liquid, possibly water, which corroded the inside of these vessels to some degree. Their height was usually 65–80 cm and they had a diameter of 40–50 cm. They were often decorated with horizontal lines around the circumference, and many possessed two shelf-like handles. A probable mention of these vessels may be seen in the book of John 2:6, which mentions the use of stone water-jars for the purity requirements of the Jews, of a volume matching that of the stone kraters found in Jerusalem. Another vessel turned on the large lathe was the barrel-shaped "cooking pot", with a height and maximum diameter of 30 cm, it usually had two shelf-like handles located on the upper portion of the body.

== Distribution and places of manufacture ==
As of 2019, archaeological excavations have revealed Jewish stone vessel assemblages at over 250 sites across various regions, including Judea, the Galilee, the Golan Heights, Idumea, and Transjordan. These findings span all recognized geographical areas historically inhabited by Jewish communities.

=== Distribution of stone vessels ===
The region of Judea boasts the highest concentration of archaeological sites where stone vessels have been unearthed. They have been found in every site with strata from the early Roman period, discoveries being documented across more than 140 sites. In the Galilee, recent findings have identified over 65 sites within the region containing these distinctive vessels, this is in contrast to initial assessments which had suggested a scarcity of such artifacts in the region. In Idumea, approximately 25 sites have yielded stone vessel assemblages, spanning areas such as the southern Hebron Mountain, the southern Shephelah, and the northern Negev. The affiliations of these finds remain uncertain, as they could belong to either descendants of ethnic Jews who migrated from Judea between the Hasmonean conquest and the Bar Kokhba revolt, or Idumeans converted by the Hasmonean king John Hyrcanus.

Excavations in the Golan Heights initially provided evidence of stone vessel use during the Second Temple period at Gamla, with subsequent investigations uncovering fragments at six additional sites in the northern Golan Heights. A survey and excavation led by Sharya Fridman further identified twelve sites with stone vessel assemblages, including a workshop for their production. Across the Transjordan region, fragments of stone vessels have been discovered within the confines of the Jewish-settled Peraea, while a significant assemblage was found in Tel Zar'ah, near Gadara, aligning with historical accounts of Jewish presence in these areas according to Josephus.

Despite being predominantly inhabited by pagans, the coastal region of Israel has yielded stone vessels in various locations such as Dor, Caesarea, Aphek (Antipatres), Jaffa, Nahalat Yehuda (Rishon LeZion), Kh. Diran (Rehovot), Yavneh Yam, and Ashdod. These discoveries corroborate historical references by Josephus indicating Jewish communities in these areas. In Samaria, stone vessels have been found at sites like Kh. El-Hamam, identified by Adam Zertal as Jewish Narbata, and in Sebastia. The absence of stone vessels at Samaritan sites contrasts sharply with their presence in Sebastia, suggesting the Jewish heritage in the latter during the pagan era.

=== Workshops and production sites ===
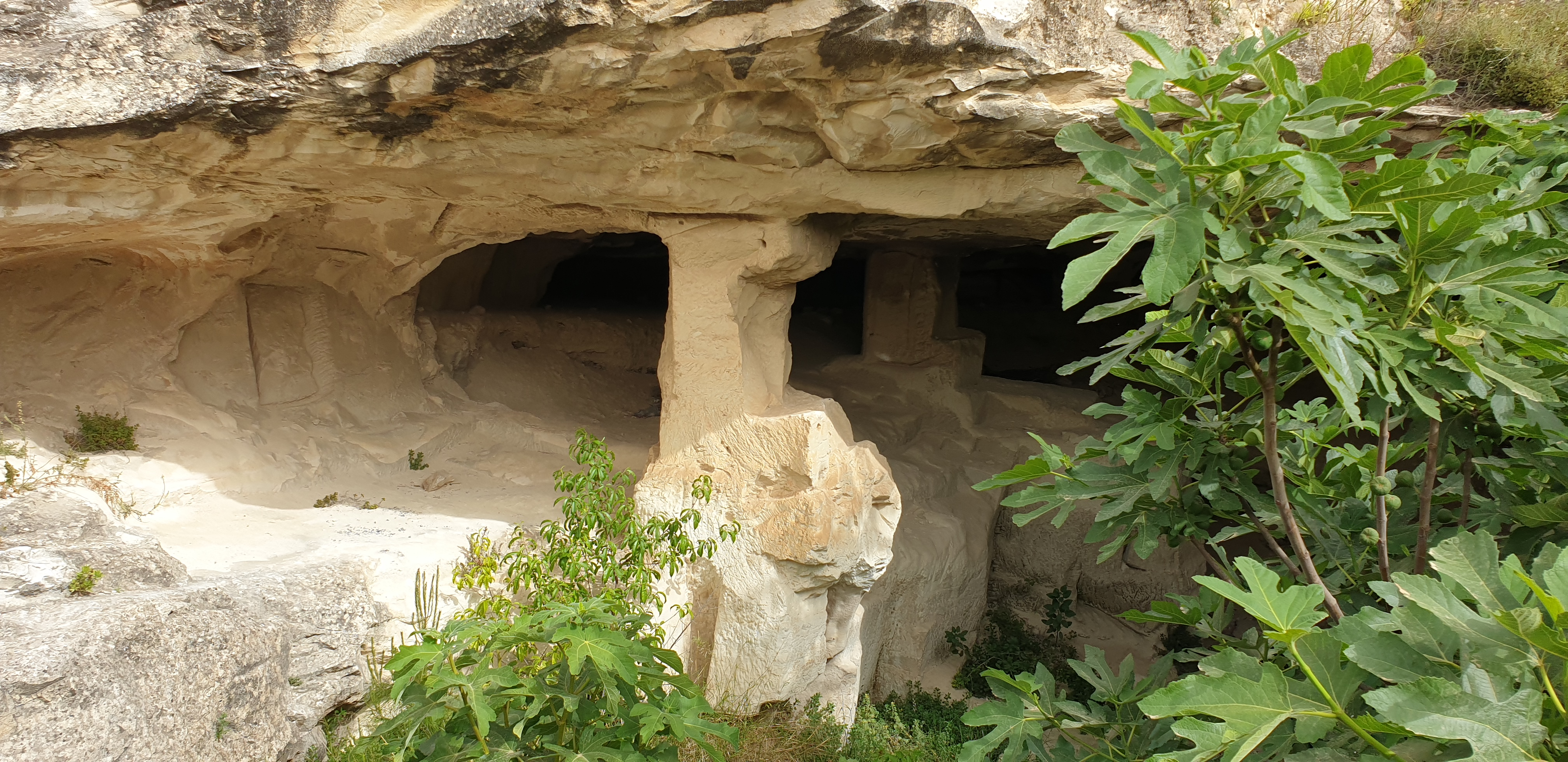
Stone vessel manufacturing site on Mount Scopus, Jerusalem

As of 2021, archaeological surveys and excavations have identified at least five, and possibly up to nine, workshops from the Second Temple period dedicated to the production of stone vessels. These workshops are situated at Mount Scopus and Hizma near Jerusalem, Einot Amitai and Reineh in the Galilee, and Wadi es-Sufera in the Golan Heights. Additionally, evidence suggests the presence of three more workshops, within the city of Jerusalem itself, in Jabal Mukaber, Tel el-Ful, and Bethlehem of Galilee. These workshops were typically housed within caves where craftsmen quarried soft limestone (chalk), while leaving stone "pillars" to prevent their collapse, and fashioned stone vessels through manual techniques or the use of lathes.

== See also ==
- Jerusalem during the Second Temple period
- Scopus stone vessels cave
- Second Temple period
- Second Temple Judaism
- Stone vessels in Ancient Egypt
