= Herodian Quarter =

Archaeological site and museum in Jerusalem

Herodian Quarter – Wohl Archaeological Museum
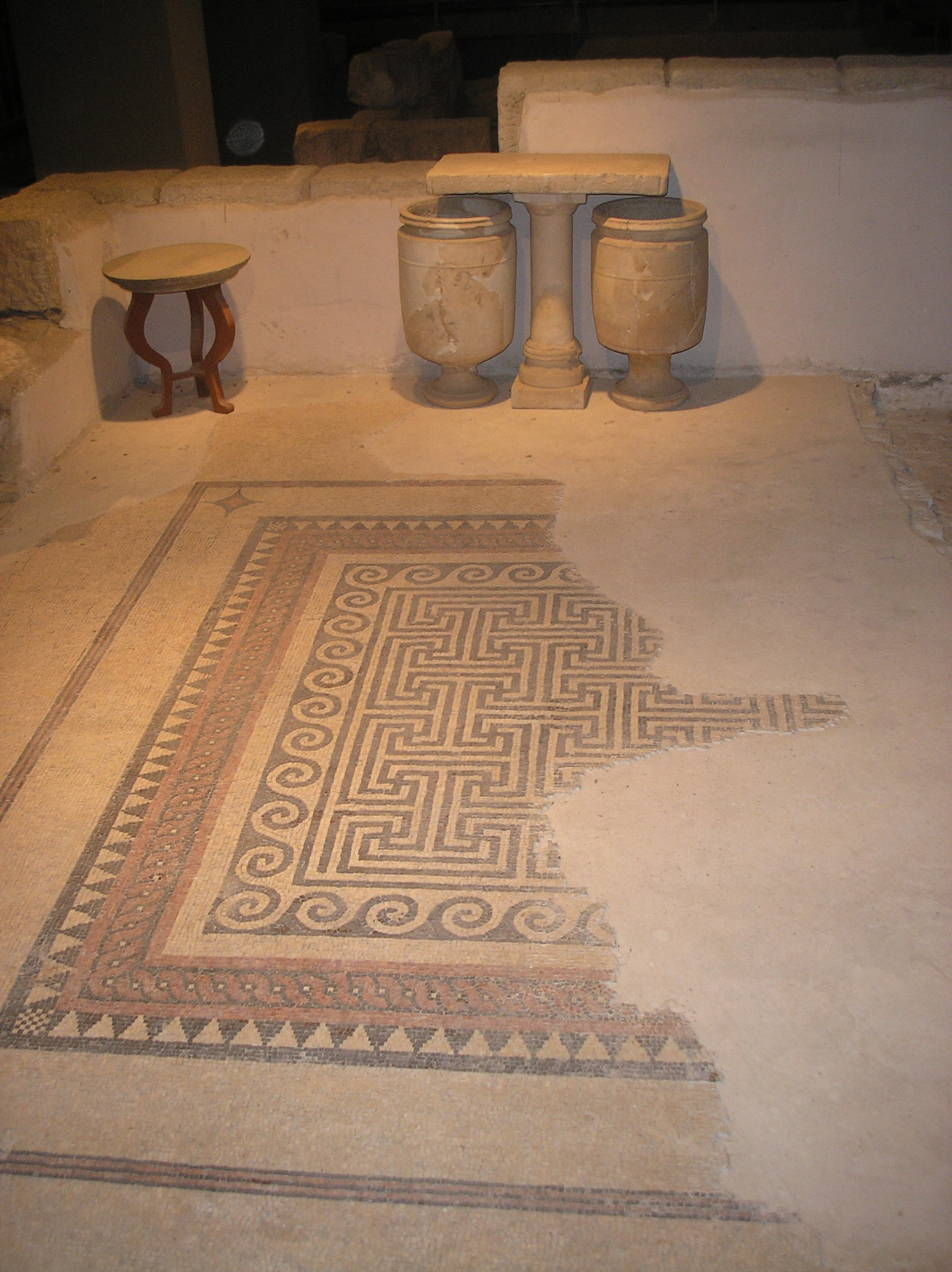
- Photo from the museum
- Interactive fullscreen map
- Established: 1988
- Location: Karaite Street; Jewish Quarter; Jerusalem
- Coordinates: 31°46′30.9″N 35°13′55.5″E
- Type: Archaeological museum
- Key holdings: Priestly mansions of the Late Second Temple period
- Public transit access: Western Wall
- Website: travelrova.co.il/language/en/the-priestly-homes-the-herodian-quarter/

The Herodian Quarter – Wohl Archaeological Museum is an underground archaeological site and museum situated in the Jewish Quarter of the Old City of Jerusalem. It exhibits lavish residencies that reflect the high standard of living among the affluent inhabitants of Jerusalem's Upper City during the late Second Temple Period and up until the city's destruction in 70 CE.

Among the exhibits are five residential buildings dating back to the Herodian period, believed to have been inhabited by priestly families, complete with ritual baths, bathhouses, and household items. The wall paintings and architectural elements are designed according to Hellenistic and Roman styles. The "Palatial Mansion" stands out with its multi-level layout surrounding a central courtyard. This grand residence includes an ornate reception area decorated in a style found in Pompeii, also featuring remnants of collapsed wooden beams, evidence of the city's destruction.

Numerous smaller discoveries were unearthed, with stone vessels standing out due to their immunity to ritual impurity under Jewish law. Luxurious imported items like terra sigillata ware and Phoenician goods, such as cosmetics and perfumes, were also uncovered. In instances where significant artifacts, like the menorah graffiti and a unique glass vessel by the Sidonian artist Aniyon, were relocated to the Israel Museum, replicas and photographs are showcased.

Discovered during the post-Six-Day War reconstruction of the Jewish Quarter, these ancient mansions were excavated by an archaeological team led by Nahman Avigad between 1969 and 1983. The museum, located beneath the Yeshivat HaKotel, was opened to visitors in 1988 after extensive restoration work. In 2024, the museum was reopened after two years of renovation works.

== Discoveries ==
Within the museum's confines lie the remnants of six residences dating back to the Herodian period. Each residence was structured around a central courtyard and likely spanned two, if not three, levels.

These houses had several baths, both for ritual and everyday use. Due to the absence of other water sources, rainwater was collected and stored in cisterns.

=== The Palatial Mansion ===
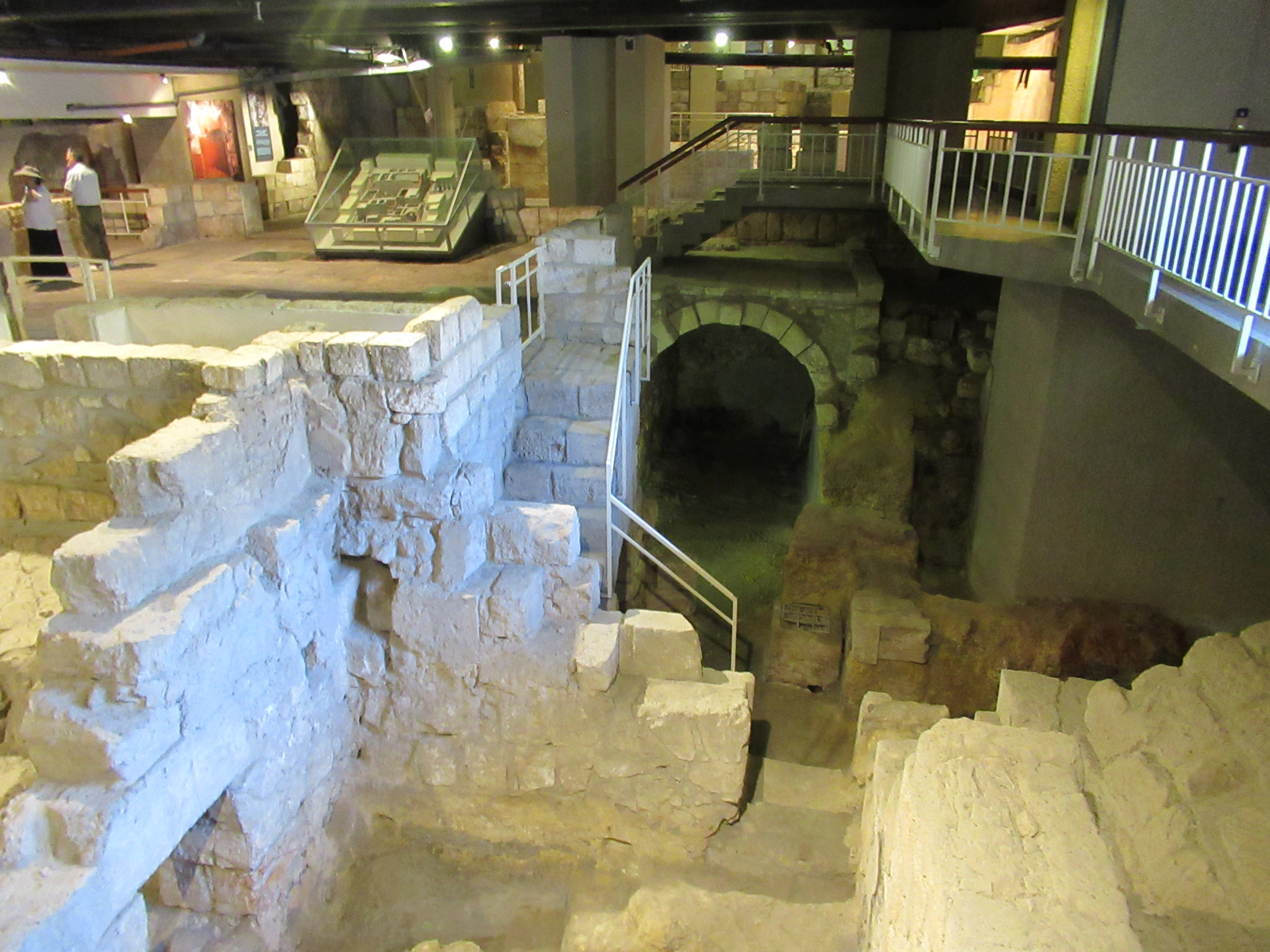
The Palatial Mansion

The "Palatial Mansion", situated on the eastern slope of the Upper City near the Temple Mount's southwest corner, was an expansive structure, covering an area of 600 square meters. Its proximity to the Royal Bridge facilitated direct access to the Temple Mount for priests, eliminating the need of first descending into the Tyropoeon Valley and then ascending again onto the Temple Mount.

The Palatial Mansion comprised two levels. The ground floor served as living quarters, while the lower level housed storerooms and water installations. Four miqva'ot, Jewish ritual baths, were discovered within the mansion.

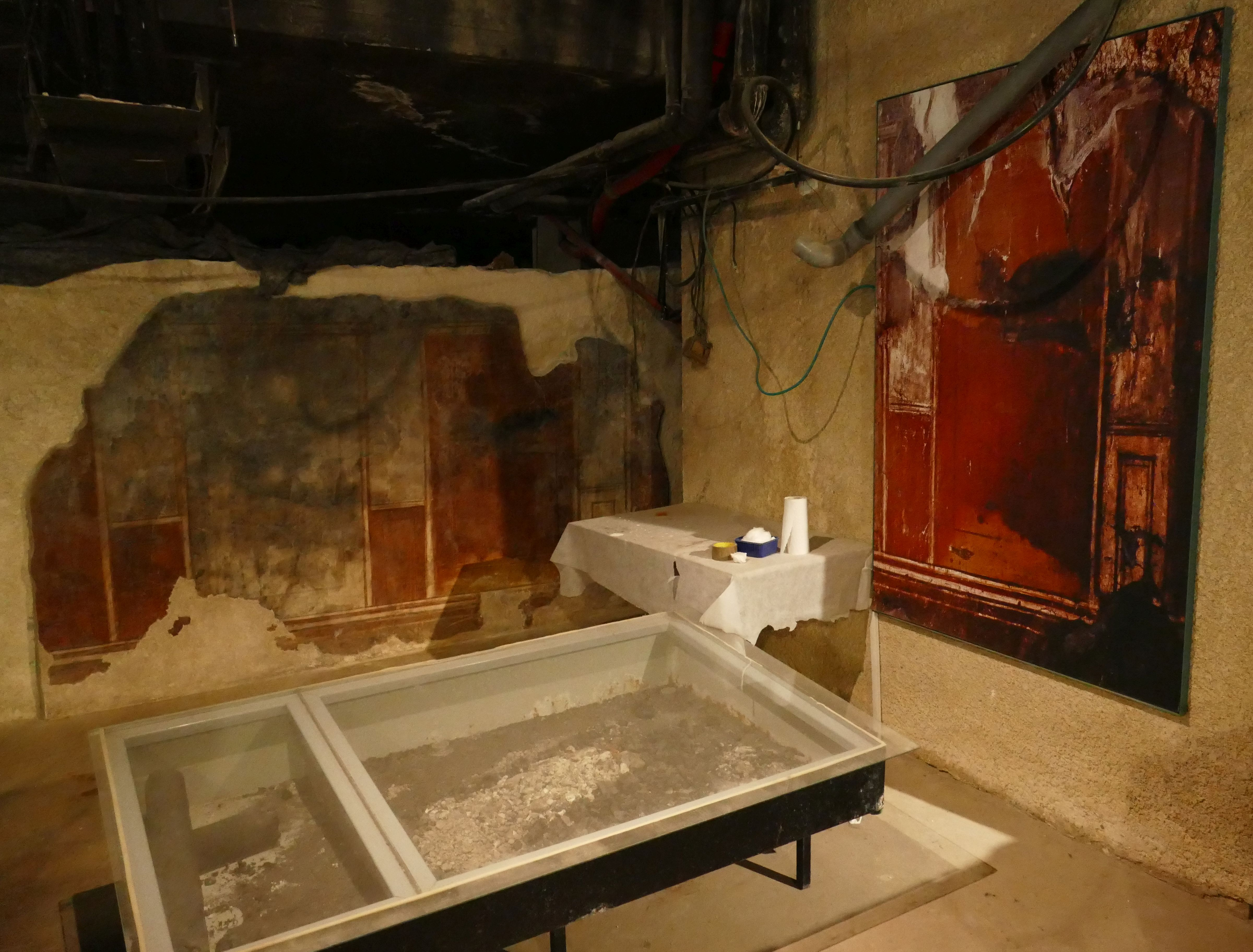
Frescoes showing marks of fire, evidence for the destruction of Jerusalem in 70 CE

Accessible from the west, the entrance led to a vestibule featuring a well-preserved mosaic floor with a central rosette pattern. From there, visitors could explore the fresco room to the right or the opulent Reception Room to the left, adorned with stuccoed walls and ceiling, an interior design for which there is comparative material in Pompeii, but without any human or animal figures. The entrance to the reception hall displays charred wooden beams of the roof, which collapsed onto the mosaic floor, destroyed in fierce fire at the time of destruction.

The courtyard led to the rooms of the eastern wing, including a preserved bathroom with a simple mosaic floor, also devoid of figures, likely preceding access to two hidden mikvehs (ritual baths). A staircase in the courtyard's northern side descended to the basement level, featuring a vestibule granting access to a large vaulted storeroom and two additional mikvehs. One mikveh boasted a double doorway and mosaic-paved entrance porch, indicative of its grandeur.

=== The Southern Building ===
The southern building features rooms encircling a central courtyard and a basement beneath, mirroring the architectural layout of the Palatial Mansion. Before entering the ritual baths, individuals would wash their feet in the pierced stone basins found here.

The southern building has been preserved in its discovered state.

== Menorah graffiti ==
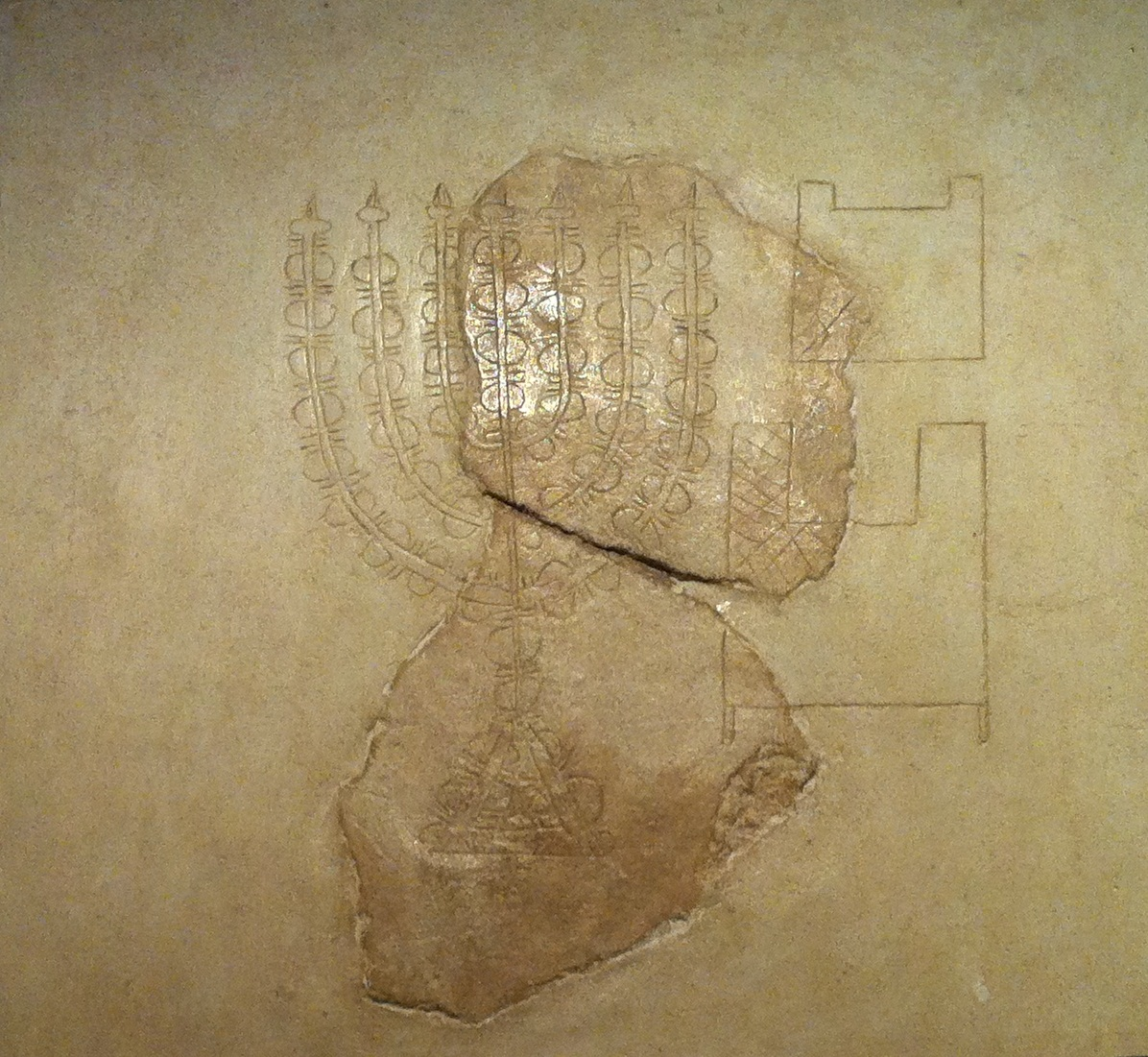
The menorah graffiti

One of the most notable discoveries in the Herodian Quarter was a graffiti depiction of a seven-armed menorah, composed of two sections each about 25 × 15 cm. The menorah's shape is largely intact, with the showbread table visible to the right, positioned beneath the incense altar. This discovery marks the first instance of a menorah featuring decorated branches and what appear to be light fixtures with lights on.

The graffiti, incised on stucco, depicts the Temple menorah during the period when it was still in the Temple. It seems to have been crafted by a local priest who had knowledge of the Temple artifacts.

The menorah graffiti is today on display in the Israel Museum, Jerusalem.

== Museum ==
The Herodian Quarter was opened to visitors during Sukkot of 1988 following extensive restoration work.

In 2024, the museum reopened after a two-year renovation costing around 5 million dollars. The project included the meticulous reconstruction of remaining home structures and the restoration of mosaics. An innovative lighting and audio system was installed, along with immersive multimedia displays featuring holograms and animations. Visitors can experience a simulated walk towards the Temple Mount from the perspective of historical residents, with suspended glass walkways providing close access to the ancient homes without compromising the archaeological remains.

The museum is located at 1, HaKara'im Street ('Street of the Karaites') in the Old City. It is part of the combined ticket for the Jewish Quarter, including sites such as the Burnt House, the Temple Institute, and the Hurva Synagogue.

== Gallery ==
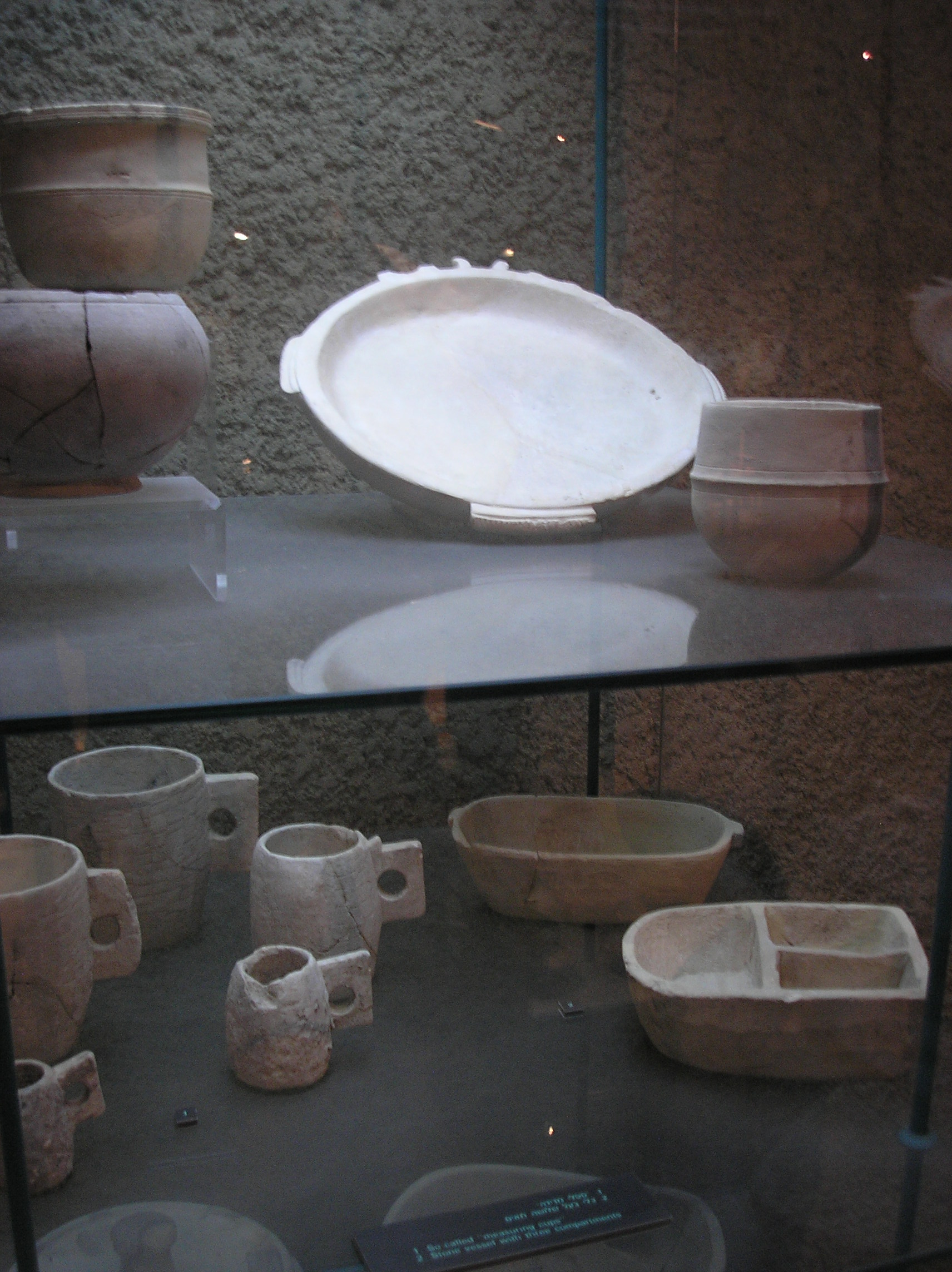
Stone vessels

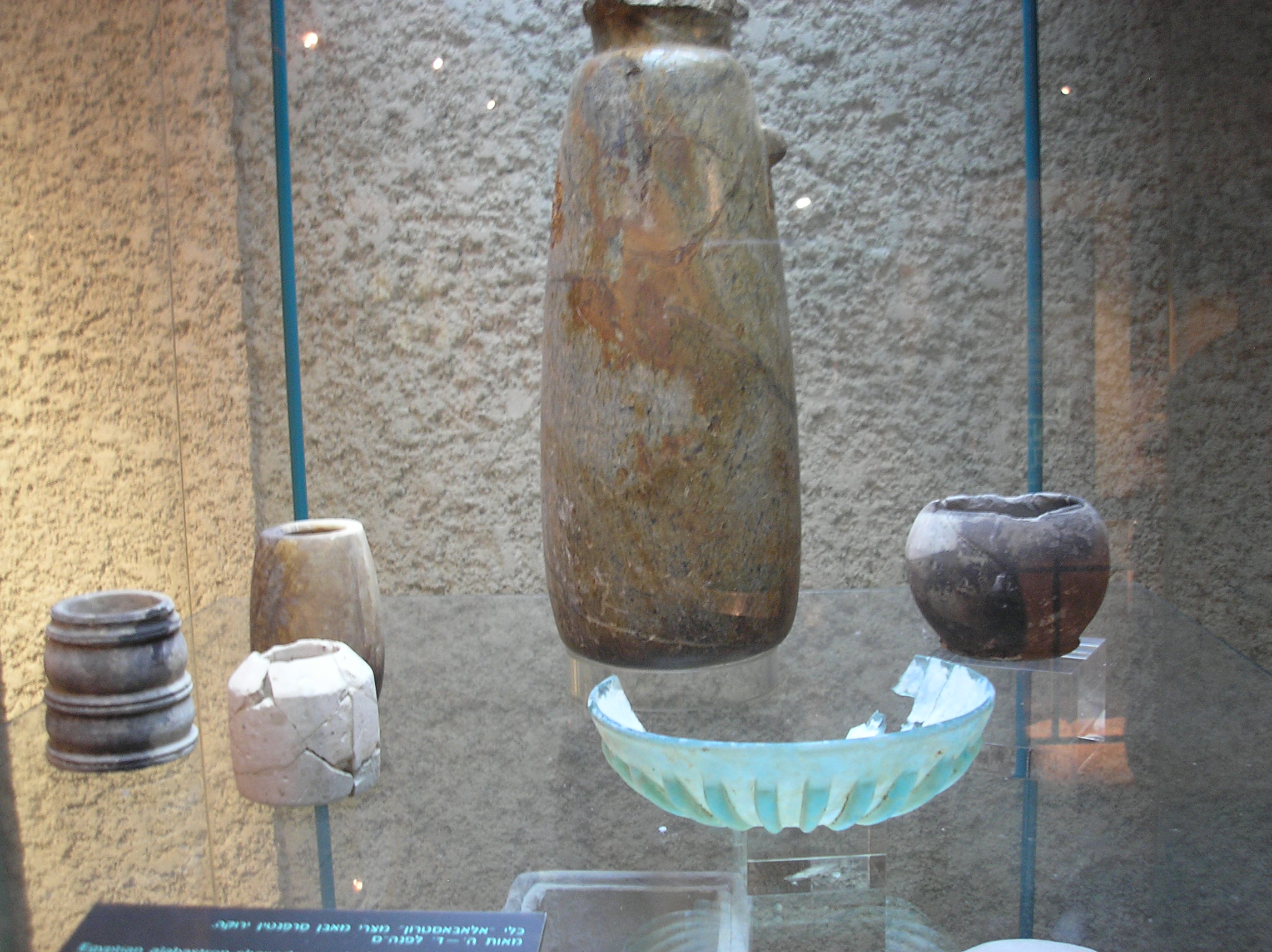
A rare glass vessel, indicating the wealth of the neighborhood's residents

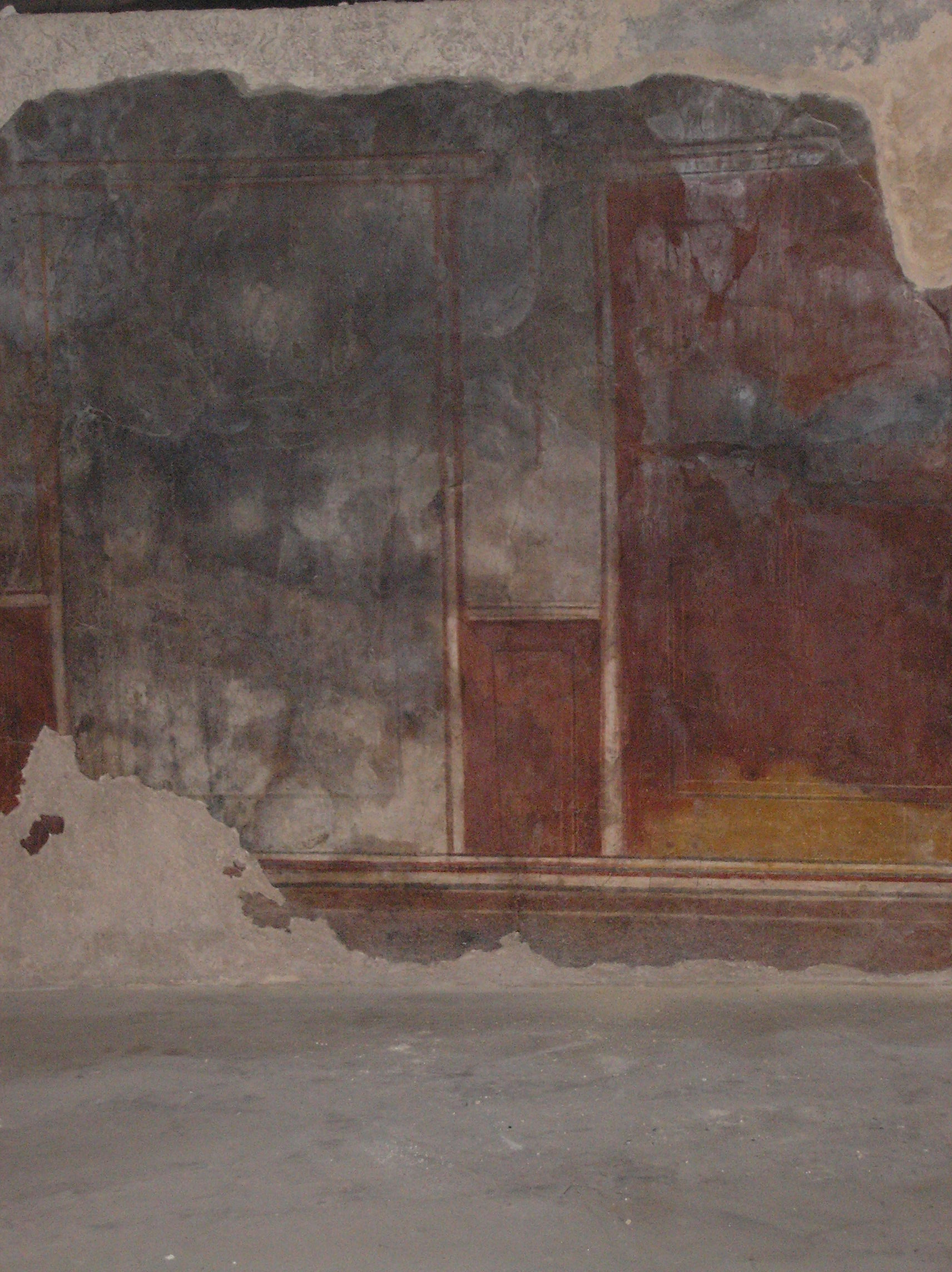
Fire marks dating from the destruction of Jerusalem by the Romans in 70

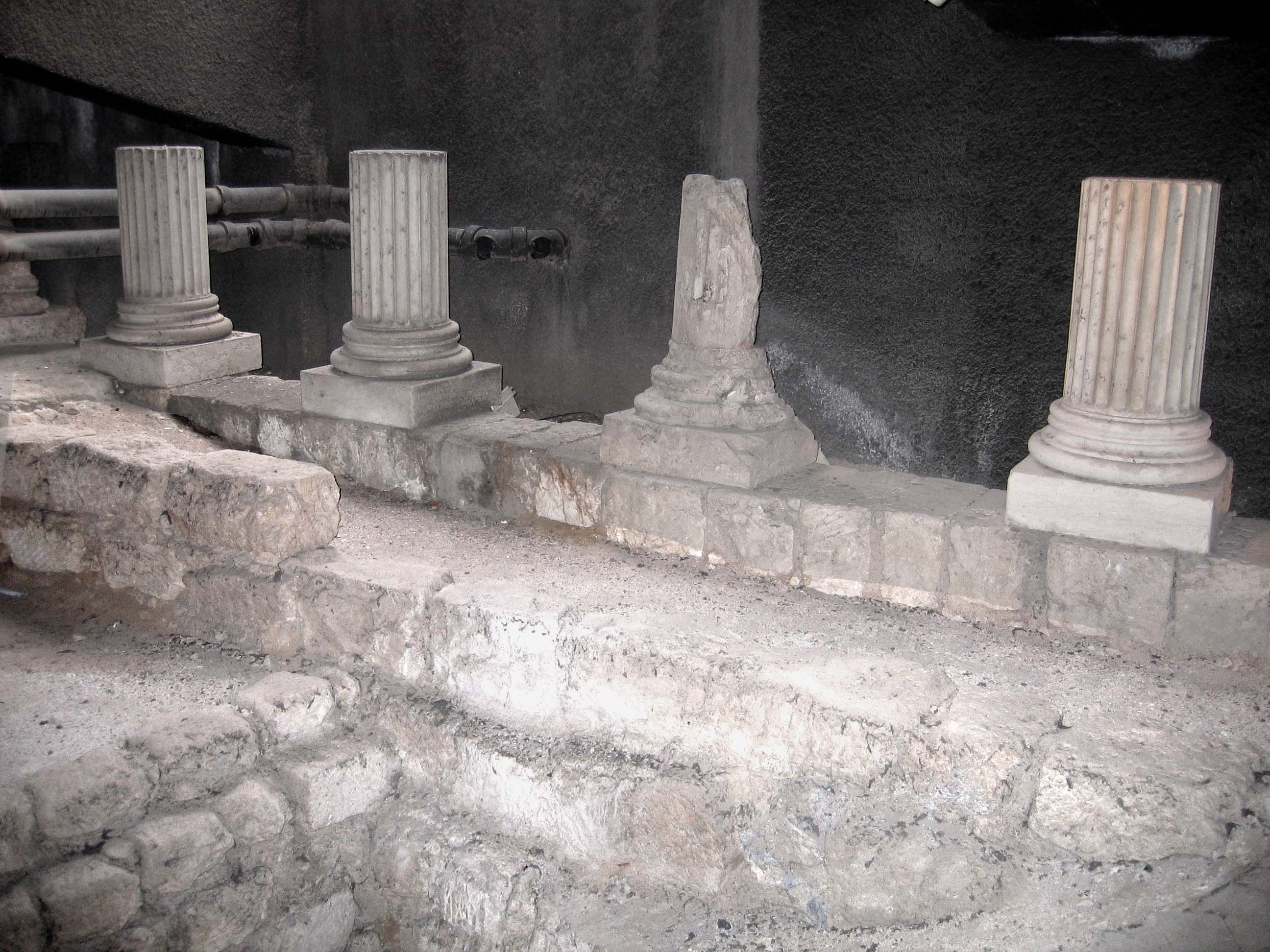
The "House of the Columns"

== Bibliography ==
- Avigad, N., The Herodian Quarter in Jerusalem: Wohl Archaeological Museum (1989). Jerusalem. [Hebrew]

== See also ==
- Burnt House – a nearby museum, showcasing the remains of another priestly mansion destroyed by the Romans in 70 CE
- Siege of Jerusalem (70 CE) – for a historical overview of the siege and the city's destruction
