= Qalal =

Qalal may refer to:

- Qalal, Azerbaijan, place name
- kallal, term used in rabbinical writings for the stone vessel used for the ashes of the red heifer
