= Simon bar Kokhba (sculpture) =

1905 sculpture by Enoch Hendryk Glicenstein

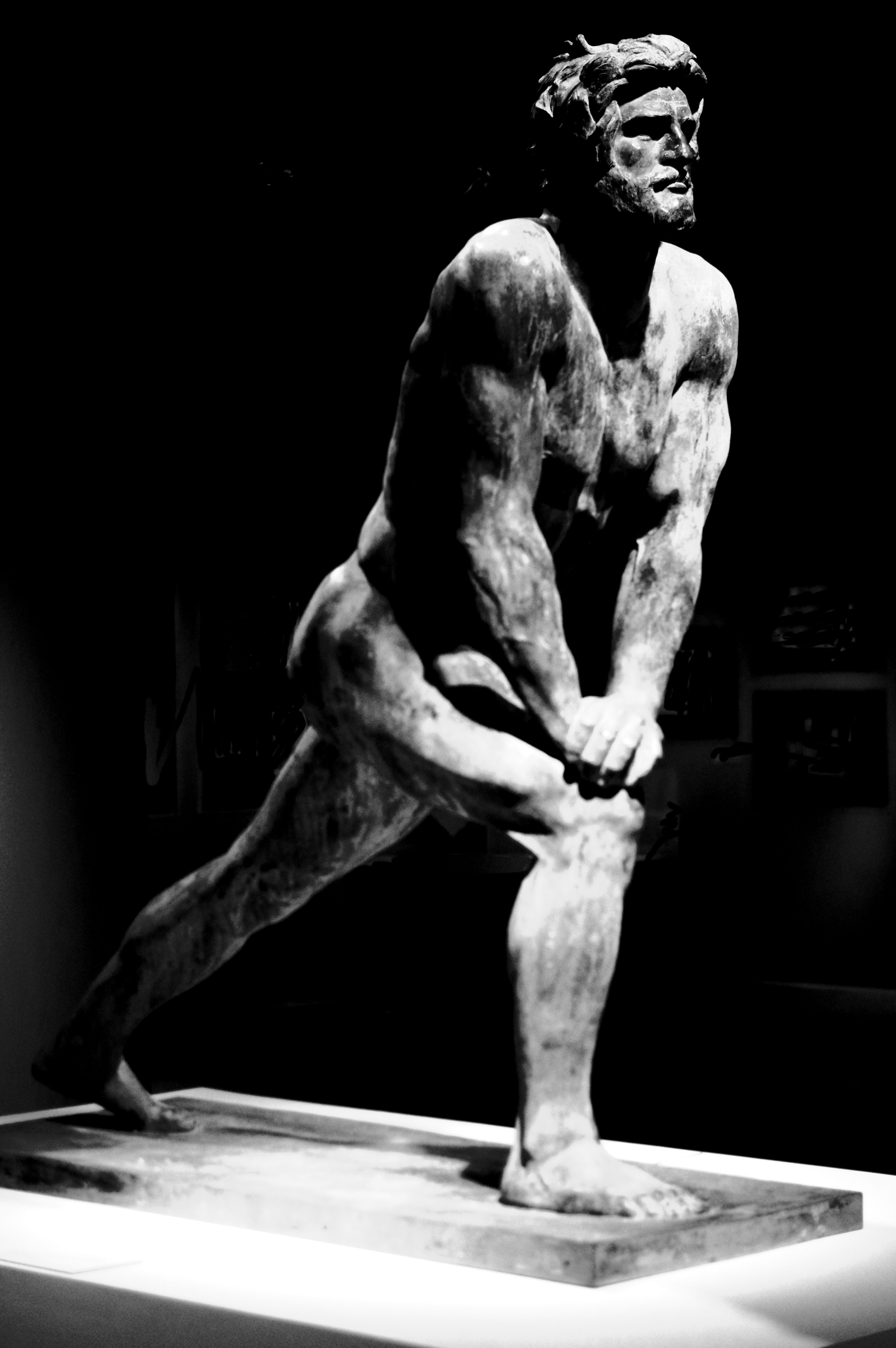
- The sculpture in the Bar Kokhba exhibition, Eretz Israel Museum
- Artist: Enoch Hendryk Glicenstein
- Year: 1905
- Medium: Bronze
- Subject: Simon bar Kokhba
- Location: Eretz Israel Museum, Tel Aviv

Simon bar Kokhba is a bronze sculpture of the Jewish historical figure Simon bar Kokhba, created by Enoch Hendryk Glicenstein in 1905. In alignment with other portrayals of bar Kokhba at the turn of the century, the sculpture presents the man as a muscular symbol of strength. The sculpture is in the collection of the Eretz Israel Museum in Tel Aviv, Israel.

The sculptor presents the Jewish leader as an athlete. The subject is the modern vision of the 'muscular Jew'.
