= Simon bar Kokhba =

Leader of the Bar Kokhba revolt (132–136 CE)

Simon bar Kokhba שִׁמְעוֹן בַּר כּוֹכְבָא
- Prince of Israel
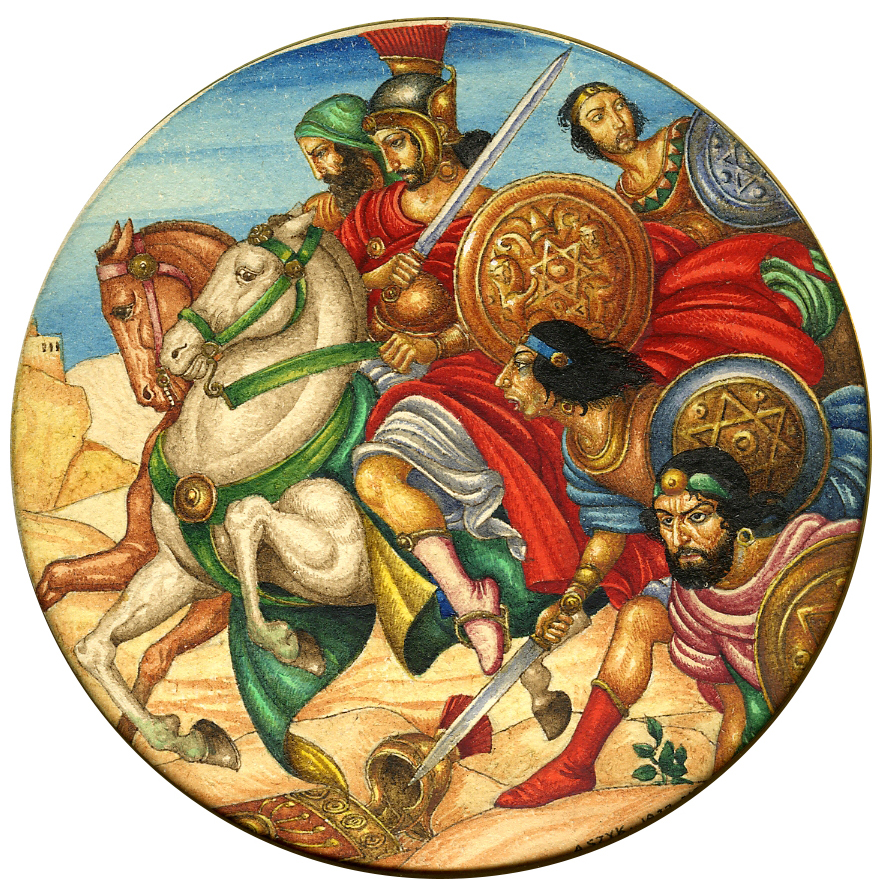
- Watercolour and gouache impression of Bar Kokhba by Polish-Jewish artist Arthur Szyk (1927)
- Reign: 132–135
- Born: Simon bar Koseba (שִׁמְעוֹן בַּר כֹסֵבָא)
- Died: 135; Betar, Judea, Roman Empire
- Religion: Judaism
- Occupation: Military leader

Simon bar Kokhba (Jewish Babylonian Aramaic: שִׁמְעוֹן בַּר כּוֹכְבָא Šīm‘ōn bar Kōḵḇāʾ; romanized as Shimon bar Kokhva), also called Simon bar Koseba (שִׁמְעוֹן בַּר כֹסֵבָא Šīm‘ōn bar Ḵōsēḇaʾ) or simply Bar Kokhba, (Note: Starting in the 16th century, based on Akiva's homily in y. Taanit 4:5 that "A כוכב star set out from Jacob (Num. 24:17) - ben כוזבא Kosiba set out from Jacob".) was a Jewish military leader in Judea. He lent his name to the Bar Kokhba Revolt, which he initiated against the Roman Empire in 132 CE. Though they were ultimately unsuccessful, Bar Kokhba and his rebels did manage to establish and maintain a Jewish state for about three years after beginning the rebellion. Bar Kokhba served as the state's leader, crowning himself as nasi (lit. 'prince'). Some of the rabbinic scholars in his time believed him to be the long-expected Messiah.

In 135, Bar Kokhba was killed by Roman troops in the fortified town of Betar. The Judean rebels who remained after his death were all killed or enslaved within the next year, and their defeat was followed by a harsh crackdown on the Judean populace by the Roman emperor Hadrian.

== Name ==
=== Documented name ===
Documents discovered in the 20th century in the Cave of Letters give his original name, with variations: Shimon bar Kosevah (שמעון בר כוסבה), Bar Kosevaʾ (בר כוסבא) or Ben Kosevaʾ (בן כוסבא). It is probable that his original name was Shimon bar Koseva. The name may indicate that his father or his place of origin was named Koseva(h), with Khirbet Kuwayzibah being a likely nominee for identification; others, namely Emil Schürer, think the surname may have been an indication of his place of birth, in the village known as Chozeba (maybe Chezib) but may as well be a general family name.

=== Nicknames ===
During the revolt, the Jewish sage Rabbi Akiva regarded Simon as the Jewish messiah. The Jerusalem Talmud (Taannit 4:5) records his statement that the Star Prophecy verse from Numbers 24:17, "There shall come a star out of Jacob," referred to him. This was based on identification of the Hebrew word for star, kokhav, and his name, bar Kozeva. The name Bar Kokhba, which references this statement of Akiva, does not appear in the Talmud, but only in ecclesiastical sources, until the 16th century. The Jerusalem Talmud (Taanit 4:5) and the Babylonian Talmud (Sanhedrin 93b and 97b) mention him by the name of Bar Kozeva.

== Revolt leader ==
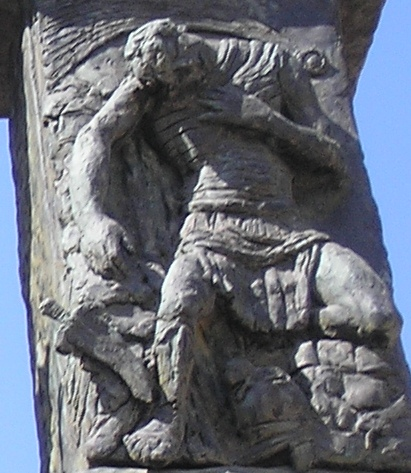
Simon bar Kokhba on the Knesset Menorah

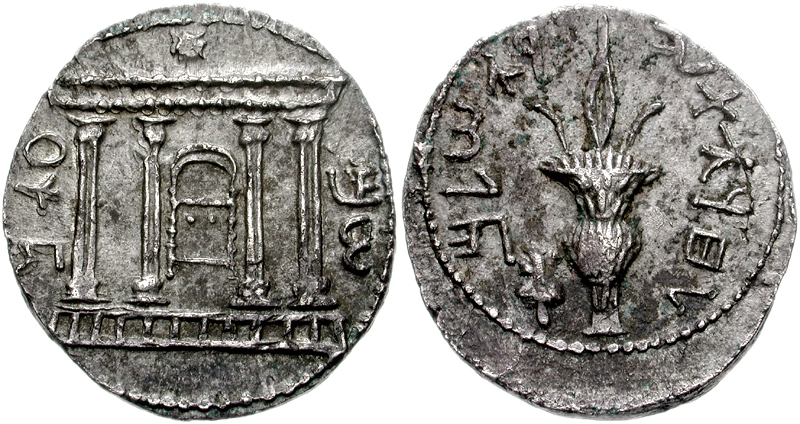
Bar Kokhba silver Shekel/tetradrachm. Obverse: the Jewish Temple facade with the rising star, surrounded by "Shimon". Reverse: a lulav and etrog, the text reads: "to the freedom of Jerusalem"

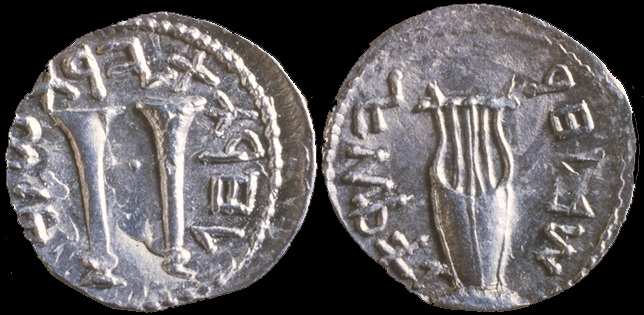
Bar Kokhba silver Zuz/denarius. Obverse: trumpets surrounded by "To the freedom of Jerusalem". Reverse: a kinnor surrounded by "Year two to the freedom of Israel"

=== Background ===
Despite the devastation wrought by the Romans during the First Jewish–Roman War (66–73 CE), which left the population and countryside in ruins, a series of laws passed by Roman Emperors provided the incentive for the second rebellion. Based on the delineation of years in Eusebius' Chronicon (whose Latin translation is known as the Chronicle of Jerome) the Jewish revolt began under the Roman governor Tineius (Tynius) Rufus in the 16th year of Hadrian's reign, or what was equivalent to the 4th year of the 227th Olympiad. Hadrian sent an army to crush the resistance, but it faced a strong opponent, since Bar Kokhba, as the recognised leader of Israel, punished any Jew who refused to join his ranks. Two and a half years later, after the war had ended, the Roman emperor Hadrian barred Jews from entering Aelia Capitolina, the pagan city he had built on the ruins of Jewish Jerusalem. The name Aelia was derived from one of the emperor's names, Aelius. According to Philostorgius, this was done so that its former Jewish inhabitants "might not find in the name of the city a pretext for claiming it as their country."

=== Overview ===
For many Jews of the time, this turn of events was heralded as the long-hoped-for Messianic Age. The Romans fared very poorly during the initial revolt facing a unified Jewish force, in contrast to the First Jewish–Roman War, where Flavius Josephus records three separate Jewish armies fighting each other for control of the Temple Mount during the three weeks after the Romans had breached Jerusalem's walls and were fighting their way to the center. Being outnumbered and taking heavy casualties, the Romans adopted a scorched earth policy which reduced and demoralised the Judean populace, slowly grinding away the Judean will to sustain the war.

During the final phase of the war, Bar Kokhba took up refuge in the fortress of Betar. The Romans eventually captured it after laying siege to the city.

The Jerusalem Talmud makes several claims considered as non-historical by modern scholarship. One such claim is that the duration of the siege was of three and half years, although the war itself lasted, according to the same author, two and half years. (Note: The 2nd century chronicler, Rabbi Yose b. Halpetha (Halafta), says in his work, Seder Olam, chapter 30, that the wars waged by Ben Koziba (i.e. Bar Kokhba) lasted two and half years, although the siege on the Jewish stronghold, Betar, is said to have lasted three and a half years.) Another part of the Talmudic narrative is that the Romans killed all the defenders except for one Jewish youth, Simeon ben Gamliel II, whose life was spared. According to Cassius Dio, writing several decades after the original events took place (132-135 AD), 580,000 Jews were killed in overall war operations across the country, and some 50 fortified towns and 985 villages razed to the ground, while the number of those who perished by famine, disease and fire was beyond finding out.

=== Outcome and aftermath ===
So costly was the Roman victory, that the Emperor Hadrian, when reporting to the Roman Senate, did not see fit to begin with the customary greeting "If you and your children are healthy, it is well; I and the legions are healthy."

In the aftermath of the war, Hadrian consolidated the older political units of Judaea, Galilee and Samaria into the new province of Syria Palaestina, which is commonly interpreted as an attempt to complete the disassociation with Judaea.

== Archaeological findings ==
In the late 20th and 21st century, new information about the revolt came to light from the discovery of several collections of letters, some possibly by Bar Kokhba himself, in the Cave of Letters overlooking the Dead Sea. These letters can now be seen at the Israel Museum.

In March 2024, a coin bearing the inscription "Eleazar the Priest" was found along with "Year 1 of the Redemption of Israel" on the bottom.

== Ideology and language ==
According to Israeli archaeologist Yigael Yadin, Bar Kokhba tried to revive Hebrew and make Hebrew the official language of the Jews as part of his messianic ideology. In A Roadmap to the Heavens: An Anthropological Study of Hegemony among Priests, Sages, and Laymen (Judaism and Jewish Life) by Sigalit Ben-Zion (page 155), Yadin remarked: "it seems that this change came as a result of the order that was given by Bar Kokhba, who wanted to revive the Hebrew language and make it the official language of the state."

== Character ==
"From Shimʻon ben Cosibah to Yeshuʻa ben Galgulah and to the men of the Gader, Peace. I call heaven to my witness that I am fed-up with the Galileans that be with you, every man! [And] that I am resolved to put fetters on your feet, just as I did to Ben ʻAflul."

(Original Hebrew)

משמעון בן כוסבה לישע בן ג[ל]גלה ולאנשי הכרך (Note: Milik read: הב]רך]; Tzeitlin read: חבריך) שלו[ם]. מעיד אני עלי ת שמים יפס[ד] (Note: Milik: יפס?; Tzeitlin: [ופס[ק) מן הגללאים שהצלכם (Note: Tzeitlin: שהצלת) כל אדם שאני נתן תכבלים (Note: Milik: ת כבלים) ברגלכם כמה שעסת[י] לבן עפלול [ש]מעון ב[ן] (Note: Milik: ב[ן כוסבה] על [נפשה])

— Murabba'at 43 Papyrus

=== Talmud ===
Simon bar Kokhba is portrayed in rabbinic literature as being somewhat irrational and irascible in conduct. The Talmud says that he presided over an army of Jewish insurgents numbering some 200,000, but had compelled its young recruits to prove their valor by each man chopping off one of his own fingers. The Sages of Israel complained to him why he marred the people of Israel with such blemishes. Whenever he would go forth into battle, he was reported as saying: "O Master of the universe, there is no need for you to assist us [against our enemies], but do not embarrass us either!" It is also said of him that he killed his maternal uncle, Rabbi Elazar Hamudaʻi, after suspecting him of collaborating with the enemy, thereby forfeiting Divine protection, which led to the destruction of Betar in which Bar Kokhba himself also perished.

Hadrian is thought to have personally supervised the closing military operations in the siege against Betar. When the Roman army eventually took the city, soldiers carried Bar Kokhba's severed head to Hadrian, and when Hadrian asked who it was that killed him, a Samaritan replied that he had killed him. When Hadrian requested that they bring the severed head (Greek: protome) of the slain victim close to him that he might see it, Hadrian observed that a serpent was wrapped around the head. Hadrian then replied: "Had it not been for God who killed him, who would have been able to kill him!?"

=== Eusebius ===
According to Eusebius' Chronicon, he severely punished the Christians with death by different means of torture for their refusal to fight against the Romans.

== In popular culture ==
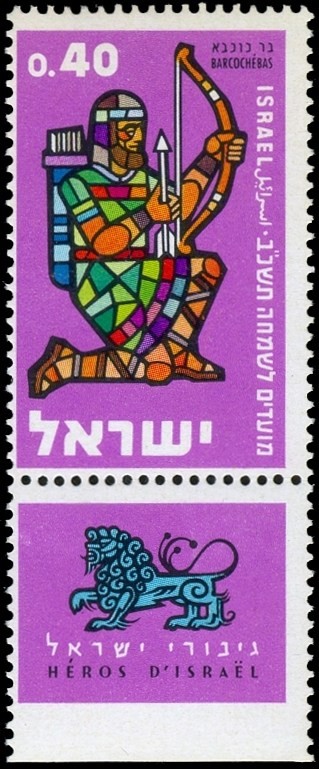
Stamp of Israel dedicated to Simon bar Kokhba, 1961

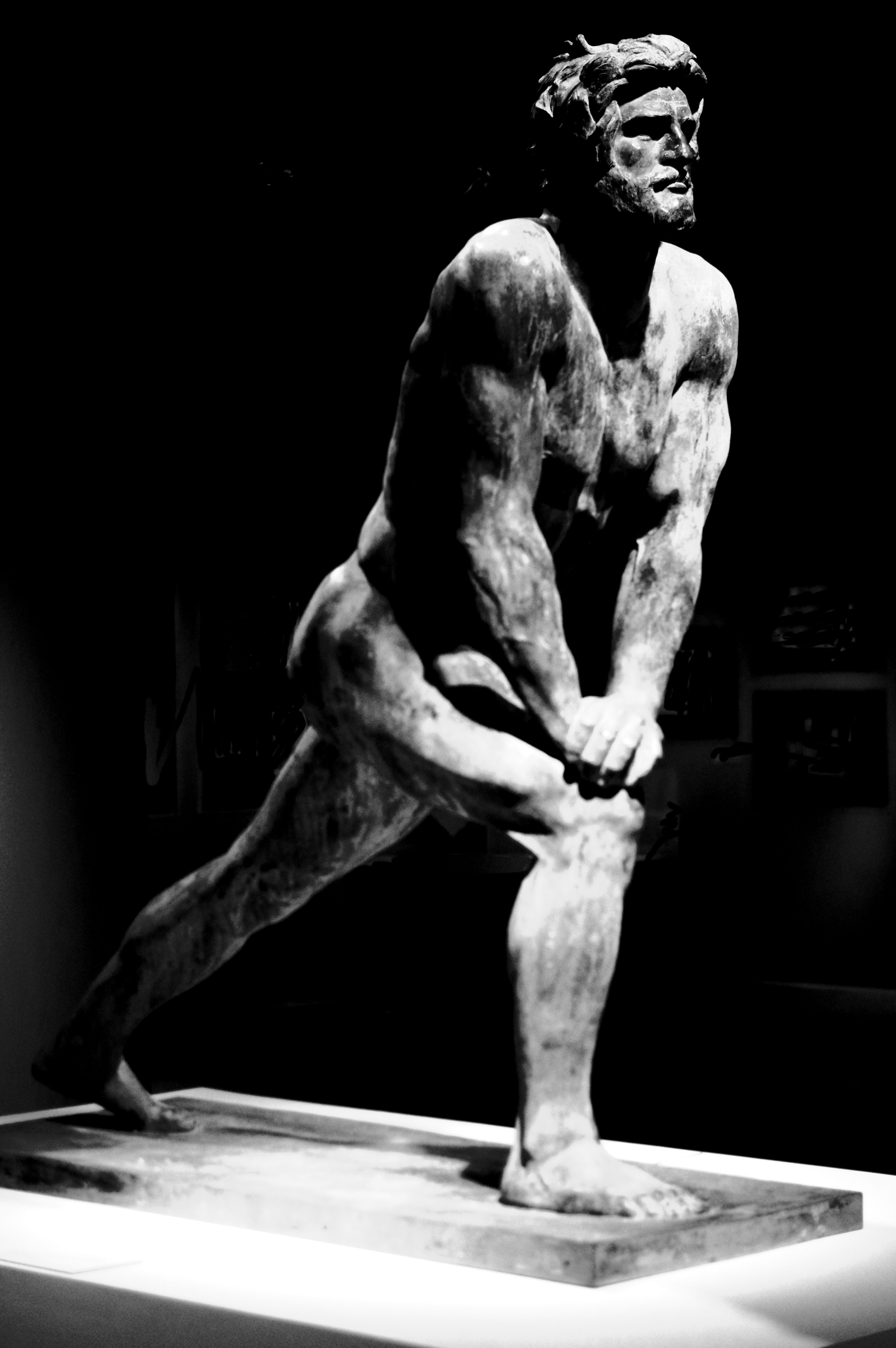
Bronze statue of Simon bar Kokhba sculpted in 1905 by Enrico Glicenstein. Currently in Eretz Israel Museum

Since the end of the nineteenth century, Bar-Kochba has been the subject of numerous works of art (dramas, operas, novels, etc.), including:

- Harisot Betar: sipur `al dever gevurat Bar Kokhva ve-hurban Betar bi-yad Adriyanus kesar Roma (1858), a Hebrew novel by Kalman Schulman
- Bar Kokhba (1882), a Yiddish operetta by Abraham Goldfaden (mus. and libr.). The work was written in the wake of pogroms against Jews following the 1881 assassination of Czar Alexander II of Russia.
- Bar Kokhba (1884), a Hebrew drama by Yehudah Loeb Landau
- The Son of a Star (1888), an English novel by Benjamin Ward Richardson
- Le fils de l'étoile (1903), a French opera by Camille Erlanger (mus.) and Catulle Mendès (libr.)
- Bar-Kochba (1905), a German opera by Stanislaus Suda (mus.) and Karl Jonas (libr.)
- Rabbi Aqiba und Bar-Kokhba (1910), a Yiddish novel by David Pinsky
- Bar-Kokhba (1929), a Hebrew drama by Shaul Tchernichovsky
- Bar-Kokhba (1939), a Yiddish drama by Shmuel Halkin
- Bar-Kokhba (1941), a Yiddish novel by Abraham Raphael Forsyth
- A csillag fia (1943), a Hungarian drama by Lajos Szabolcsi
- Steiersønne (1952), a Danish novel by Poul Borchsenius
- Prince of Israel (1952), an English novel by Elias Gilner
- Bar-Kokhba (1953), a Hebrew novel by Joseph Opatoshu
- Son of a Star (1969), an English novel by Andrew Meisels
- If I Forget Thee (1983), an English novel by Brenda Lesley Segal
- Kokav mi-mesilato. Haye Bar-Kokhba (A Star in Its Course: The Life of Bar-Kokhba) (1988), a Hebrew novel by S.J. Kreutner
- Ha-mered ha-midbar. Roman historiah mi-tequfat Bar-Kokhba (1988), a Hebrew novel by Yeroshua Perah
- My Husband, Bar Kokhba (2003), an English novel by Andrew Sanders
- Knowledge Columns (2014), an American rap song by Dopey Ziegler
- Son Of A Star (2015), song by Israeli metal band Desert
- Les armées de Dieu (2025), historical novel by Stephane Luchmun - Editions Le Lys Bleu

Another operetta on the subject of Bar Kokhba was written by the Russian-Jewish emigre composer Yaacov Bilansky Levanon in Palestine in the 1920s.

John Zorn's Masada Chamber Ensemble recorded an album called Bar Kokhba, showing a photograph of the Letter of Bar Kokhba to Yeshua, son of Galgola on the cover.

=== The Bar Kokhba game ===
According to a legend probably invented in Budapest Bar Kokhba sent a scout to the Roman camp. The scout was captured and tortured including having his tongue ripped out and hands cut off, but escaped and was able to return to Bar Kokhba who asked simple questions which only needed the scout to nod or shake his head.

In a "Bar Kokhba game" invented in Hungary, possibly by the inventor of the story, one of two players comes up with a word or object, while the other must figure it out by asking questions only to be answered with "yes" or "no". The questioner usually asks first if it is a living being, if not, if it is an object, if not, it is surely an abstraction. The verb kibarkochbázni ("to Bar Kochba out") became a common language verb meaning "retrieving information in an extremely tedious way".

== See also ==
- Bar Kokhba Revolt coinage
- Bar Kokhba weights
- Simon bar Kokhba Sculpture
- Jewish Messiah claimants
- Lukuas
- Rabbinic stance on Bar Kokhba revolt

== Bibliography ==
- Eck, W. 'The Bar Kokhba Revolt: the Roman point of view' in the Journal of Roman Studies 89 (1999) 76ff.
- Goodblatt, David; Pinnick, Avital; Schwartz Daniel: Historical Perspectives: From the Hasmoneans to the Bar Kohkba Revolt In Light of the Dead Sea Scrolls: Boston: Brill: 2001: ISBN 90-04-12007-6
- Marks, Richard: The Image of Bar Kokhba in Traditional Jewish Literature: False Messiah and National Hero: University Park: Pennsylvania State University Press: 1994: ISBN 0-271-00939-X
- Reznick, Leibel: The Mystery of Bar Kokhba: Northvale: J.Aronson: 1996: ISBN 1-56821-502-9
- Schafer, Peter: The Bar Kokhba War Reconsidered: Tübingen: Mohr: 2003: ISBN 3-16-148076-7
- Ussishkin, David: "Archaeological Soundings at Betar, Bar-Kochba's Last Stronghold", in: Tel Aviv. Journal of the Institute of Archaeology of Tel Aviv University 20 (1993) 66ff.
- Yadin, Yigael: Bar Kokhba: The Rediscovery of the Legendary Hero of the Last Jewish Revolt Against Imperial Rome: London: Weidenfeld and Nicolson: 1971: ISBN 0-297-00345-3
