= Kallal =

Jewish ritual object

According to rabbinical sources, the kallal was a small stone urn kept in the Tabernacle and later in the Jewish temple in Jerusalem which contained the ashes of a red heifer. The Hebrew Bible does not mention any urn in the Numbers 19 account. Kallal is the Aramaic word for a stone vessel or pitcher. Alternatively, kallal is also used for large jars for washing.

== Mishnah ==
The kalal is mentioned specifically in the Mishnah (Parah 3:3, Eduyot 7:5), Hebrew Rabbinic writings describe vessels hidden under the direction of Jeremiah seven years prior to the destruction of Solomon's Temple, because the dangers of Babylonian conquest were imminent. The vessels that were hidden included the Ark of the Covenant and the Tabernacle fittings, the stone tablets of Moses, the altar (with cherubim) for the daily and seasonal sacrifices, the menorah (candelabra), the kallal and numerous vessels of the priests.

== Vendyl Jones and the Dead Sea Scrolls ==
Mainstream scholarship does not recognise any mention of the kallal vessels in the Dead Sea Scrolls. However, in the interpretation of Vendyl Jones, the Copper Scroll found at Qumran and kept in the Jordan Museum (previously in the Jordan Archaeological Museum) contains mention of sixty-four lost objects buried in the "Cave of the Column", including a kallal buried behind a pillar, which would be a reference to the kallal of ashes in the Mishnah. Jones died without finding such an urn, and his findings and readings of the Copper Scroll have not been accepted.
