= Bar Kokhba weight =

Jewish revolt weights

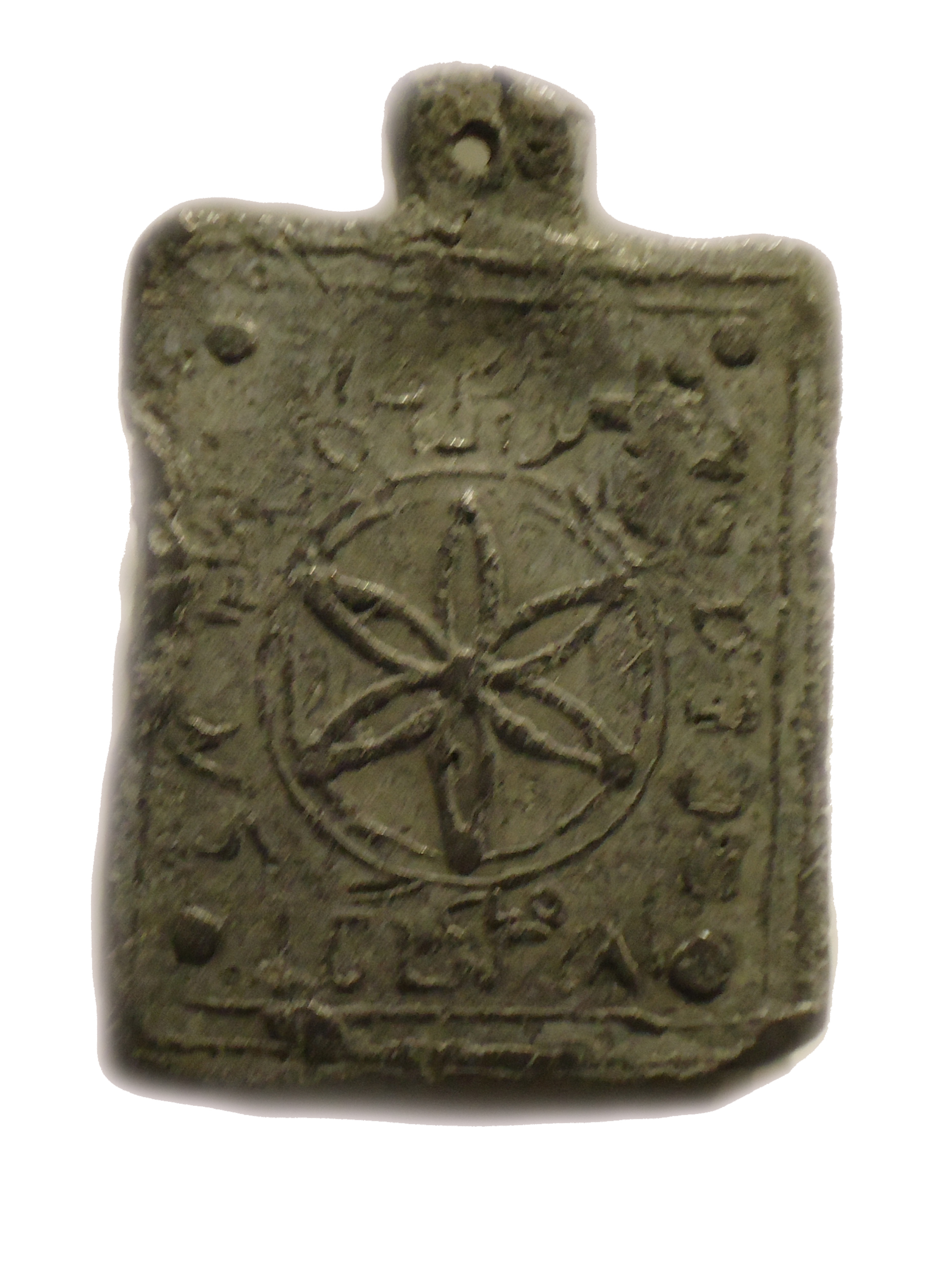
Bar Kokhba weight found in Beit Guvrin, Israel

Bar Kokhba weights are weights that were used during the Bar Kokhba revolt. Of the seven weights found so far, six weights originated from the antiquities market, and only one was found in an archeological survey.

== Weights with Hebrew inscriptions ==
Four weights are from the Bar Kokhba period, on which the inscription is inscribed using the square Hebrew alphabet.

One lead weight was found in 1987 by Yair Zoran in an underground hideout in Horvat Alim near Beit Guvrin. The weight was published by Amos Kloner. The weight is 803 grams (1.770 lb), decorated with a stylish rosette and surrounded by a Hebrew inscription. Kloner mentioned in his article that an additional weight was bought in 1967 for the Eretz Israel Museum but was stolen in 1976. It weighed about 400 grams (14 oz). Until the weight was found in 1987, it was not known that this weight belonged to the Bar Kokhba period. Another two weights that Kloner mentions were published by Baruch Lipschitz, one of them weighed 210 grams (7.4 oz), while the other weighed 205 grams (7.2 oz).

== Weights with Paleo-Hebrew inscriptions ==
Three other weights originating in the antiquities market bear an inscription in the Paleo-Hebrew alphabet.

In 2001, Robert Deutsch published another weight which weighed 421 grams (14.9 oz). It is inscribed in the Ancient Hebrew alphabet: Shimon, Son of Kosba, Prince of Israel. It was purchased by Shlomo Moussaieff. In 2003, Deutsch published another weight weighing 215 grams (7.6 oz), with an inscription in the ancient Hebrew alphabet: Shimon, Prince of Israel.
