= Opopanax =

Opopanax ("the juice of all-heal") can refer to:

== Plants ==
- Opopanax, a genus in the family Apiaceae
- Vachellia farnesiana, a species in the family Fabaceae

== Gum resins ==
- Perfumery's opopanax, the oleo-gum-resin of Commiphora guidottii
  - The oleo-gum-resin of Commiphora kataf (syn. C. holtziana, C. erythraea), sometimes sold under the name of opoponax
- True opopanax, the gum resin of Opopanax chironium or other Opopanax species

== Literature ==
- L'Opoponax, the 1964 novel in French by Monique Wittig
