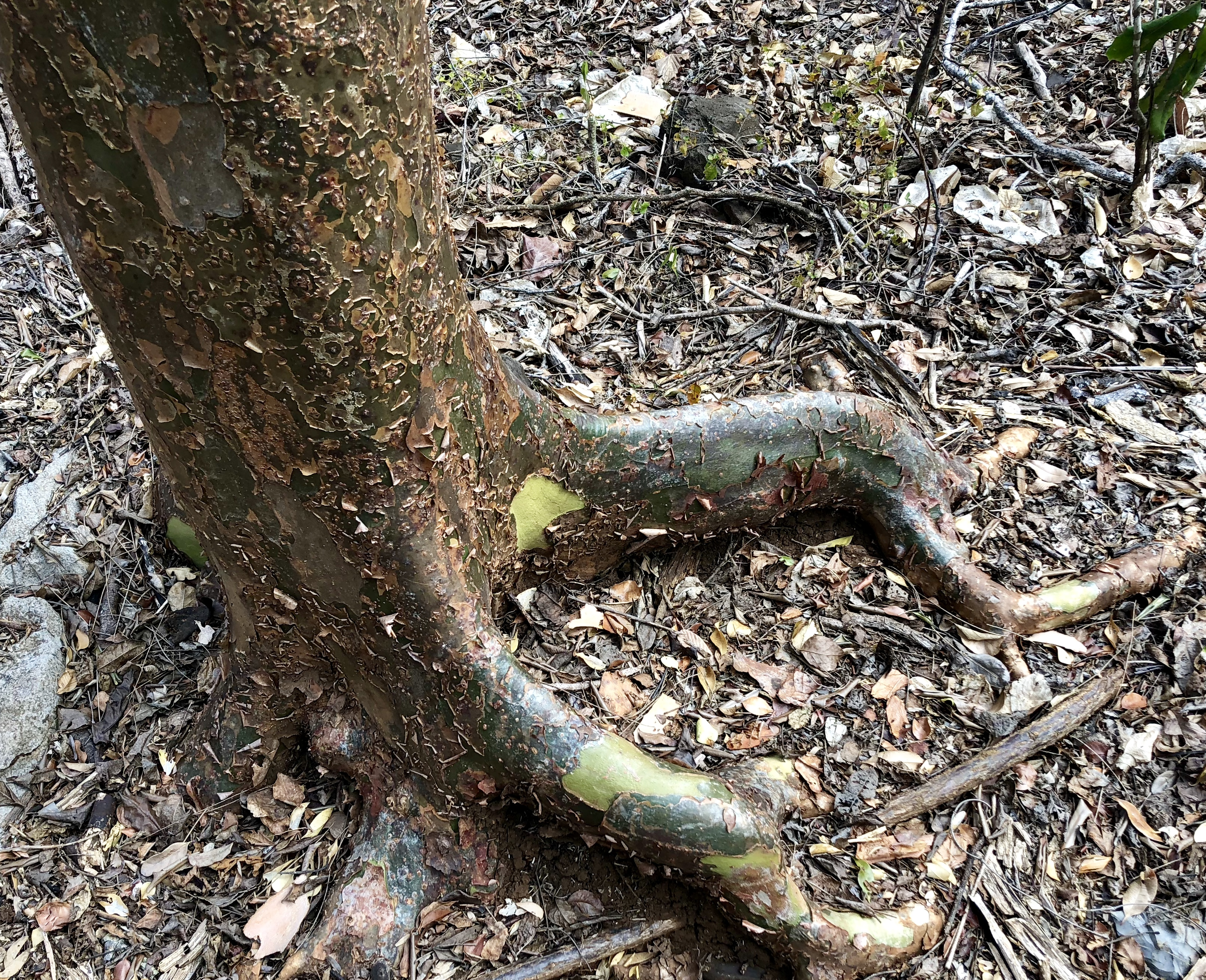
- In Ankarana Reserve, Madagascar

Conservation status
- Least Concern (IUCN 3.1)

Scientific classification
- Kingdom: Plantae
- Clade: Embryophytes
- Clade: Tracheophytes
- Clade: Angiosperms
- Clade: Eudicots
- Clade: Rosids
- Order: Sapindales
- Family: Burseraceae
- Genus: Commiphora
- Species: C. aprevalii

Binomial name
- Commiphora aprevalii (Baill.) Guillaumin

Synonyms
- Balsamea aprevallii Baill.

= Commiphora aprevalii =

Species of tree

Commiphora aprevalii, known locally as the Vazaha tree, is a member of the Burseraceae family. It is endemic to Madagascar. In Malagasy, "Vazaha" means stranger or foreigner; the name likens the characteristic peeling bark to the peeling skin of a badly sunburnt tourist.

The Vazaha tree is a deciduous succulent, which tolerates dry season conditions by shedding its leaves and storing water in its trunk and branches. The peeling bark is thought to help the trunk and branches photosynthesize.

The leaves of C. aprevalii are pinnate with lanceolate leaflets. The species is a close relative of the myrrh tree, Commiphora myrrha.

The species was named after André Revillon d'Apreval, a French botanical illustrator active at the turn of the twentieth century.

Another member of the Burseraceae family from across the world, the gumbo-limbo, shares both the peeling bark and the teasing nickname “tourist tree”.

== Ecology ==
Commiphora aprevalii occurs on the island of Madagascar from sea level to 1,100 m (3,600 ft) in dry and sub-arid climates.
