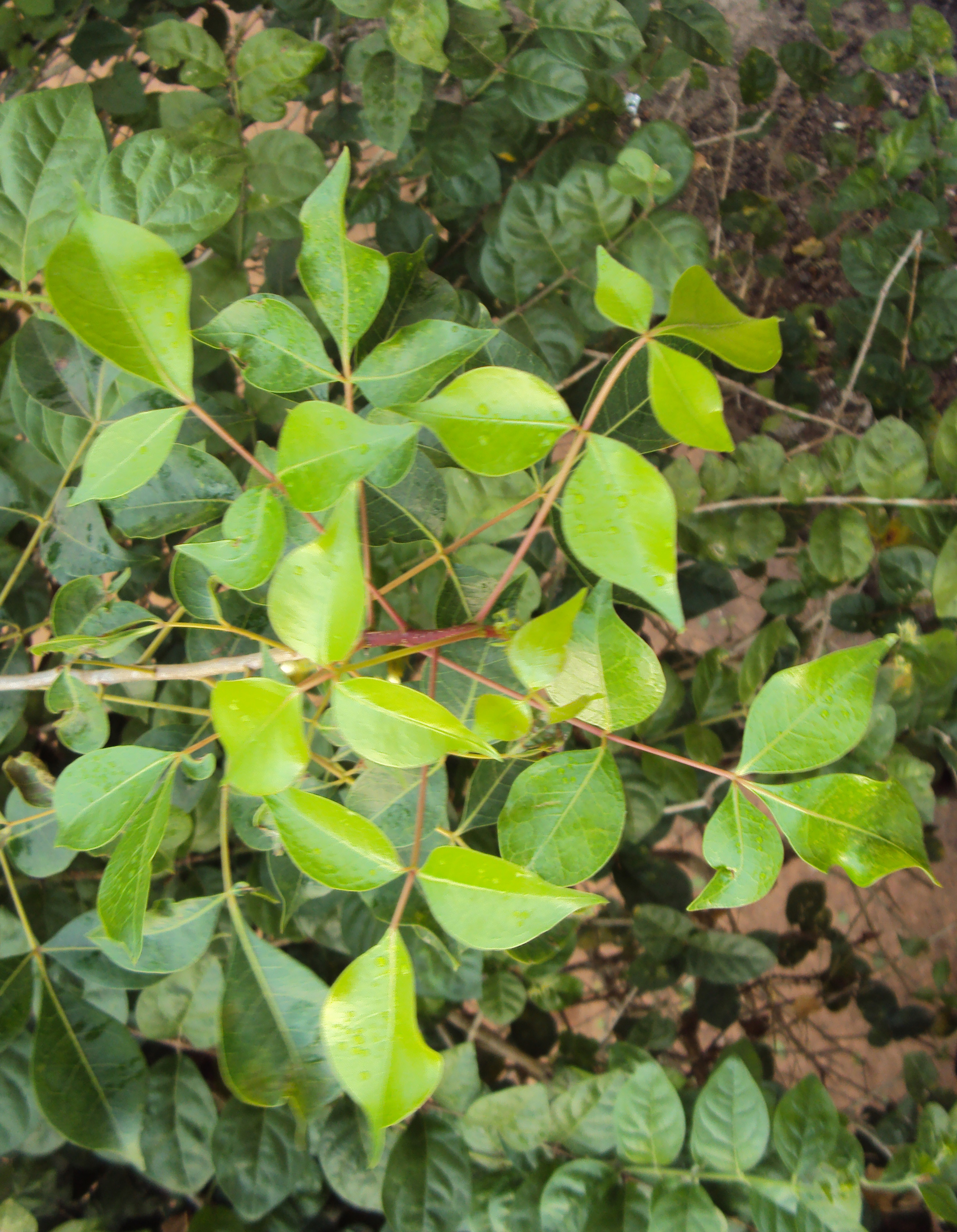
- Commiphora caudata

Scientific classification
- Kingdom: Plantae
- Clade: Embryophytes
- Clade: Tracheophytes
- Clade: Angiosperms
- Clade: Eudicots
- Clade: Rosids
- Order: Sapindales
- Family: Burseraceae
- Genus: Commiphora; Jacq. (1797)

Species
- ca. 190. See text.

Synonyms
- Balessam Bruce (1790); Balsamea Gled. (1782); Balsamodendrum Kunth (1824); Balsamophloeos O.Berg (1862); Balsamus Stackh. (1814); Bdellion Baill. ex Laness. (1886), not validly publ.; Hemprichia Ehrenb. (1829); Heudelotia A.Rich. (1831); Hitzera Klotzsch (1861); Neomangenotia J.-F.Leroy (1976); Niotoutt Adans. (1759); Protionopsis Blume (1850); Spondiopsis Engl. (1895)

= Commiphora =

Genus of flowering plants

Commiphora is the most species-rich genus of flowering plants in the frankincense and myrrh family, Burseraceae. The genus contains approximately 190 species of shrubs and trees, which are distributed throughout the (sub-) tropical regions of Africa, the western Indian Ocean islands, the Arabian Peninsula, India, and South America. The genus is drought-tolerant and common throughout the xerophytic scrub, seasonally dry tropical forests, and woodlands of these regions.

The common name myrrh refers to several species of the genus, from which aromatic resins are derived for various fragrance and medicinal uses by humans.

A previously unknown species belonging to this genus has been grown from a single ancient seed and tentatively identified as the biblical plant mentioned in the Bible as the source of a medicinal extract called tsori.

== Description ==
Leaves in Commiphora are pinnately compound (or very rarely unifoliolate). Many species are armed with spines. Bark is often exfoliating, peeling in thin sheets to reveal colorful, sometimes photosynthetic, bark below. Stems are frequently succulent, especially in species native to drier environments. Flowers are typically dioecious (subdioecious) and fruits are drupes, usually with a 2-locular ovary (one is abortive). In response to wounding, the stems of many species will exude aromatic resins.

== Ecology and biogeography ==
Commiphora can serve as a model genus for understanding plant evolution in the drier regions of the Old World tropics, particularly in eastern continental Africa and Madagascar, where diversity in the genus is concentrated. The closely related sister genus to Commiphora, Bursera, has been used as a model genus to study patterns of evolution in the New World seasonally dry tropical forests.

== Use by humans ==
Products from many species of Commiphora have been used for various purposes, sometimes as timber, building material, and natural fencing, but more often valued for the aromatic resins produced by several members of the genus. "Myrrh", the common name for these dried resins, is fragrant and has been used both as fragrance and for medicinal purposes (e.g., Balsam of Mecca, C. gileadensis). Use of myrrh resin is frequent and pronounced throughout historical texts of cultural significance, including the Bible.

=== Ancient seed ===
An ancient seed recovered from an archaeological site in the Judean Desert has been confirmed to be a member of Commiphora. The 1,000-year-old seed has produced a tree growing at Louis Borick Natural Medicine Research Center.

== Systematics and taxonomy ==
Studies using DNA sequence data have confirmed the monophyly of Commiphora; however, this data suggests that previous classification of the genus into sections does not reflect monophyletic interspecific relationships.

=== Species ===
181 species are accepted:

- Commiphora acuminata Mattick
- Commiphora africana (A.Rich.) Engl. (syn. Heudelotia africana), sometimes identified with ancient bdellium. Used indirectly by the San bushmen to poison their arrow tips for hunting
- Commiphora alata Chiov.
- Commiphora alaticaulis J.B.Gillett & Vollesen
- Commiphora anacardiifolia Dinter & Engl.
- Commiphora andranovoryensis Phillipson, Raharim., A.Weeks & Gostel
- Commiphora angolensis Engl., also known as "sand commiphora", growing mainly in Angola and Namibia
- Commiphora angustifoliolata Mendes
- Commiphora ankaranensis (J.-F.Leroy) Cheek & Rakot.
- Commiphora antunesii Engl.
- Commiphora aprevalii Guillaumin, endemic to Madagascar
- Commiphora arafy H.Perrier
- Commiphora arenaria Thulin
- Commiphora baluensis Engl.
- Commiphora benguelensis Swanepoel
- Commiphora berardellii Chiov.
- Commiphora berryi (Arn.) Engl.
- Commiphora boranensis Vollesen
- Commiphora brevicalyx H.Perrier
- Commiphora buruxa Swanepoel
- Commiphora caerulea Burtt
- Commiphora campestris Engl.
- Commiphora capensis (Sond.) Engl.
- Commiphora capuronii Bard.-Vauc.
- Commiphora caudata (Wight & Arn.) Engl.
- Commiphora cervifolia Van der Walt
- Commiphora chaetocarpa J.B.Gillett
- Commiphora chevalieri Engl.
- Commiphora chiovendana J.B.Gillett ex Thulin
- Commiphora ciliata Vollesen
- Commiphora coleopsis H.Perrier
- Commiphora confusa Vollesen
- Commiphora corrugata J.B.Gillett & Vollesen
- Commiphora crenatoserrata Engl.
- Commiphora cuneifolia Baker
- Commiphora cyclophylla Chiov.
- Commiphora dalzielii Hutch.
- Commiphora dinteri Engl.
- Commiphora discolor Mendes
- Commiphora drake-brockmanii Sprague
- Commiphora dulcis Engl.
- Commiphora edulis (Klotzsch) Engl.
- Commiphora elliptica Phillipson, Raharim., A.Weeks & Gostel
- Commiphora eminii Engl.
- Commiphora engleri Guillaumin
- Commiphora enneaphylla Chiov.
- Commiphora erlangeriana Engl.
- Commiphora erosa Vollesen
- Commiphora falcata Capuron
- Commiphora foliacea Sprague
- Commiphora franciscana Capuron
- Commiphora fraxinifolia Baker
- Commiphora fraxinoides (Hiern) K.Schum.
- Commiphora fulvotomentosa Engl.
- Commiphora gardoensis J.B.Gillett ex Thulin
- Commiphora gariepensis Swanepoel
- Commiphora giessii Van der Walt
- Commiphora gileadensis (L.) C.Chr. (syn. Commiphora opobalsamum), producing balsam of Mecca.
- Commiphora glandulosa Schinz
- Commiphora glaucescens Engl.
- Commiphora gorinii Chiov.
- Commiphora gracilifrondosa Dinter ex Van der Walt
- Commiphora grandifolia Engl.
- Commiphora grosswelleri Engl.
- Commiphora guerichiania Engl.
- Commiphora guidottii Chiov. ex Guid. (syn. Commiphora sessiliflora), producing habak hadi, known as bisabol, opoponax, scented or sweet myrrh.
- Commiphora guillauminii H.Perrier
- Commiphora gurreh Engl.
- Commiphora hartmannii Engl.
- Commiphora harveyi (Engl.) Engl.
- Commiphora hereroensis Schinz
- Commiphora hildebrandtii Engl.
- Commiphora hodai Sprague
- Commiphora hornbyi Burtt
- Commiphora horrida Chiov.
- Commiphora humbertii H.Perrier
- Commiphora kaokoensis Swanepoel
- Commiphora karibensis Wild
- Commiphora kataf (Forssk.) Engl.(syn. Commiphora holtziana Engl, Commiphora erythraea (Ehrenb.) Engl.), producing habak hagar, known as sweet myrrh, sometimes sold as opoponax.
- Commiphora kerstingii Engl.
- Commiphora kraeuseliana Heine
- Commiphora kua (R.Br. ex Royle) Vollesen (syn. Commiphora habessinica (O.Berg) Engl.)
- Commiphora kucharii Thulin
- Commiphora kuneneana Swanepoel
- Commiphora lacerata Thulin
- Commiphora lamii H.Perrier
- Commiphora lasiodisca H.Perrier
- Commiphora laxecymigera H.Perrier
- Commiphora leandriana H.Perrier
- Commiphora leptophloeos (Mart.) J.B.Gillett, the only species of Commiphora present in the Americas.
- Commiphora lobatospathulata J.B.Gillett ex Thulin
- Commiphora longibracteata Engl.
- Commiphora madagascariensis Jacq.
- Commiphora mafaidoha H.Perrier
- Commiphora mahafaliensis Capuron
- Commiphora marchandii Engl.
- Commiphora marlothii Engl.
- Commiphora merkeri Engl.
- Commiphora merkii Engl.
- Commiphora mildbraedii Engl.
- Commiphora mollis (Oliv.) Engl.
- Commiphora mombassensis Engl.
- Commiphora monoica Vollesen
- Commiphora monstruosa (H.Perrier) Capuron
- Commiphora morondavensis Phillipson, Raharim., A.Weeks & Gostel
- Commiphora mossambicensis (Oliv.) Engl.
- Commiphora mossamedensis Mendes
- Commiphora mulelame (Hiern) K.Schum.
- Commiphora multifoliolata J.B.Gillett ex Thulin
- Commiphora multijuga (Hiern) K.Schum.
- Commiphora murraywatsonii J.B.Gillett ex Thulin
- Commiphora myrrha (Nees) Engl. (syn. Commiphora molmol), producing myrrh.
- Commiphora namaensis Schinz
- Commiphora namibensis Swanepoel
- Commiphora neglecta I.Verd.
- Commiphora oblanceolata Schinz
- Commiphora oblongifolia J.B.Gillett
- Commiphora obovata Chiov.
- Commiphora oddurensis Chiov.
- Commiphora omundomba Swanepoel & A.Weeks
- Commiphora orbicularis Engl.
- Commiphora ornifolia (Balf.f.) J.B.Gillett
- Commiphora otjihipana Swanepoel
- Commiphora ovalifolia J.B.Gillett
- Commiphora paolii Chiov.
- Commiphora parvifolia (Balf.f.) Engl.
- Commiphora pedunculata (Kotschy & Peyr.) Engl.
- Commiphora pervilleana Engl.
- Commiphora planifrons (Balf.f.) Engl.
- Commiphora playfairii (Hook.f. ex Oliv.) Engl.
- Commiphora pruinosa Engl.
- Commiphora pseudopaolii J.B.Gillett
- Commiphora pteleifolia Engl.
- Commiphora pterocarpa H.Perrier
- Commiphora pyracanthoides Engl.
- Commiphora quadricincta Schweinf.
- Commiphora quercifoliola J.B.Gillett ex Thulin
- Commiphora rangeana Engl.
- Commiphora razakamalalae Gostel, Phillipson & A.Weeks
- Commiphora rostrata Engl.
- Commiphora ruquietiana Dinter & Engl.
- Commiphora ruspolii Chiov.
- Commiphora samharensis Schweinf.
- Commiphora sarandensis Burtt
- Commiphora saxicola Engl., Rock corkwood, a shrub endemic to Namibia
- Commiphora schimperi (O.Bergman) Engl.
- Commiphora schlechteri Engl.
- Commiphora schultzei Engl.
- Commiphora sennii Chiov.
- Commiphora serrata Engl.
- Commiphora serrulata Engl.
- Commiphora setulifera Chiov. ex Guid.
- Commiphora simplicifolia H.Perrier
- Commiphora shankarsinhiana K.D.Thacker & K.S.Rajput
- Commiphora sinuata H.Perrier
- Commiphora socotrana (Balf.f.) Engl.
- Commiphora spathulata Mattick
- Commiphora spathulifoliolata Engl.
- Commiphora sphaerocarpa Chiov
- Commiphora spinulosa J.B.Gillett ex Thulin
- Commiphora staphyleifolia Chiov.
- Commiphora stellatopubescens J.B.Gillett ex Thulin
- Commiphora stellulata H.Perrier
- Commiphora steynii Swanepoel
- Commiphora stocksiana (Engl.) Engl., known in Pakistan as bayisa gugal
- Commiphora sulcata Chiov.
- Commiphora swynnertonii Burtt
- Commiphora tenuipetiolata Engl.
- Commiphora tetramera Engl.
- Commiphora truncata Engl.
- Commiphora tsimanampetsae Capuron
- Commiphora ugogensis Engl.
- Commiphora ulugurensis Engl.
- Commiphora unilobata J.B.Gillett & Vollesen
- Commiphora viminea Burtt Davy
- Commiphora virgata Engl.
- Commiphora wightii (Arn.) Bhandari (syn. Commiphora mukul), producing gum guggul, sometimes identified with ancient bdellium.
- Commiphora wildii Merxm.
- Commiphora woodii Engl.
- Commiphora zanzibarica (Baill.) Engl.

== Gallery ==
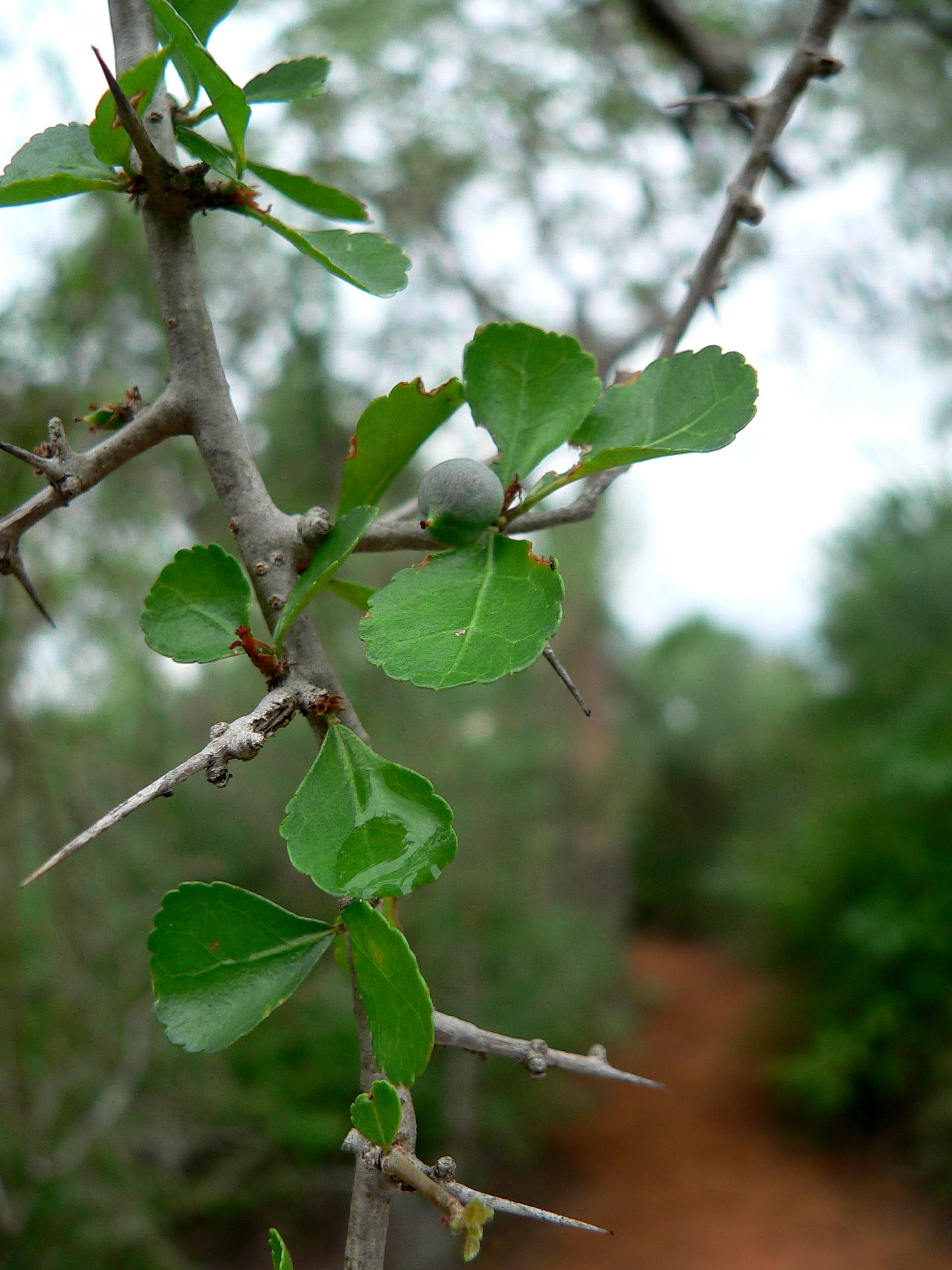
Commiphora simplicifolia

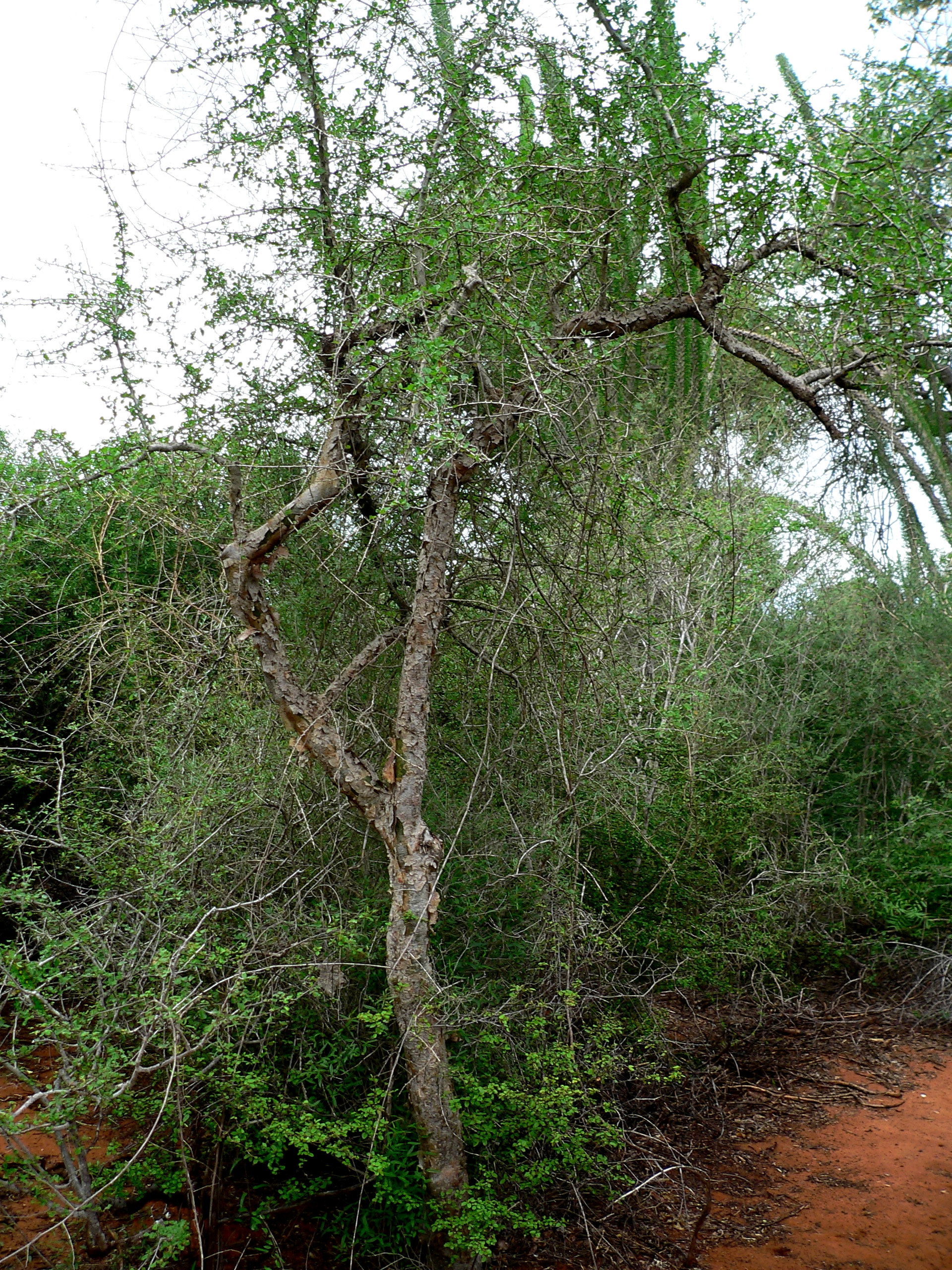
Commiphora simplicifolia

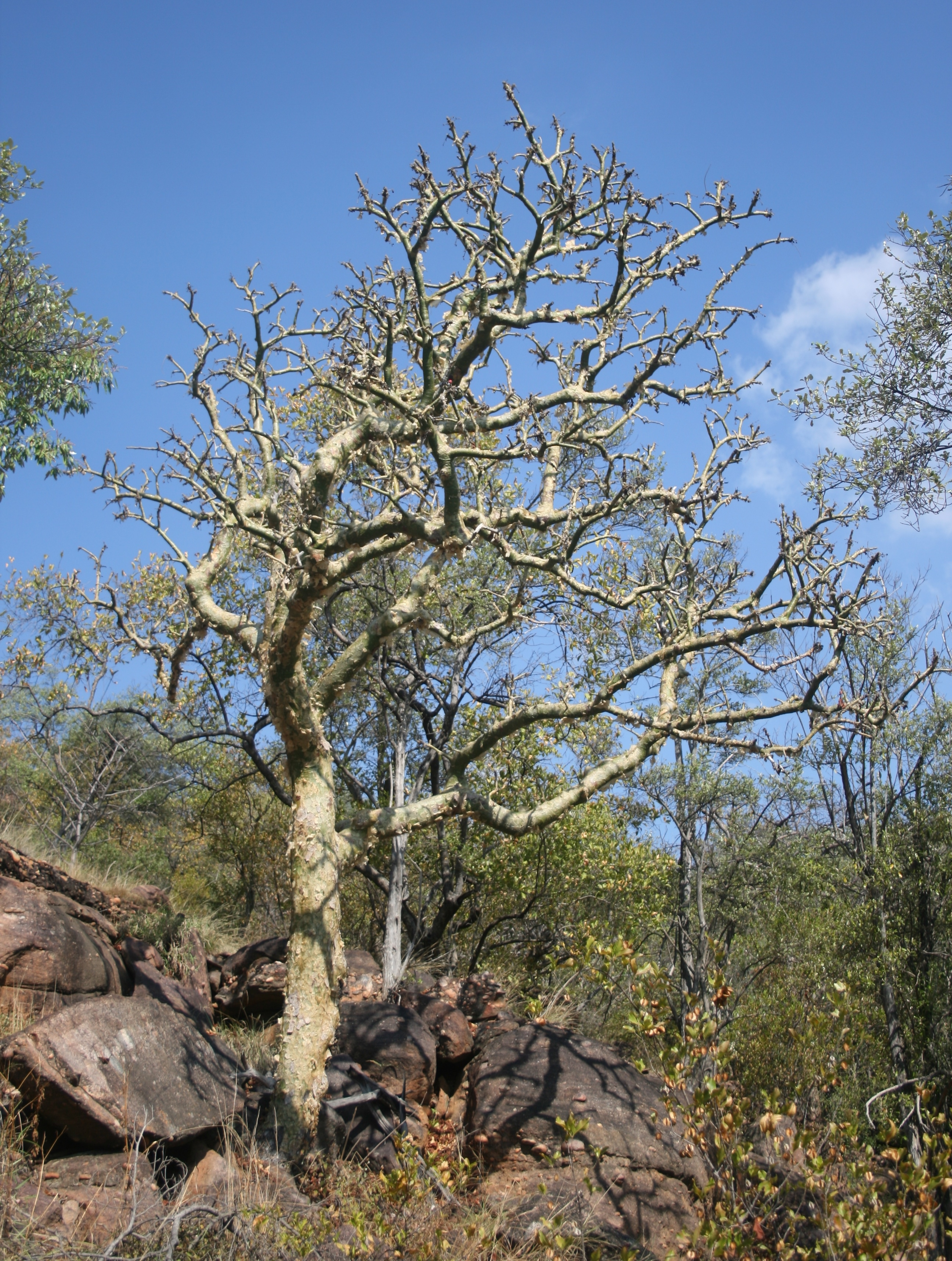
Commiphora marlothii

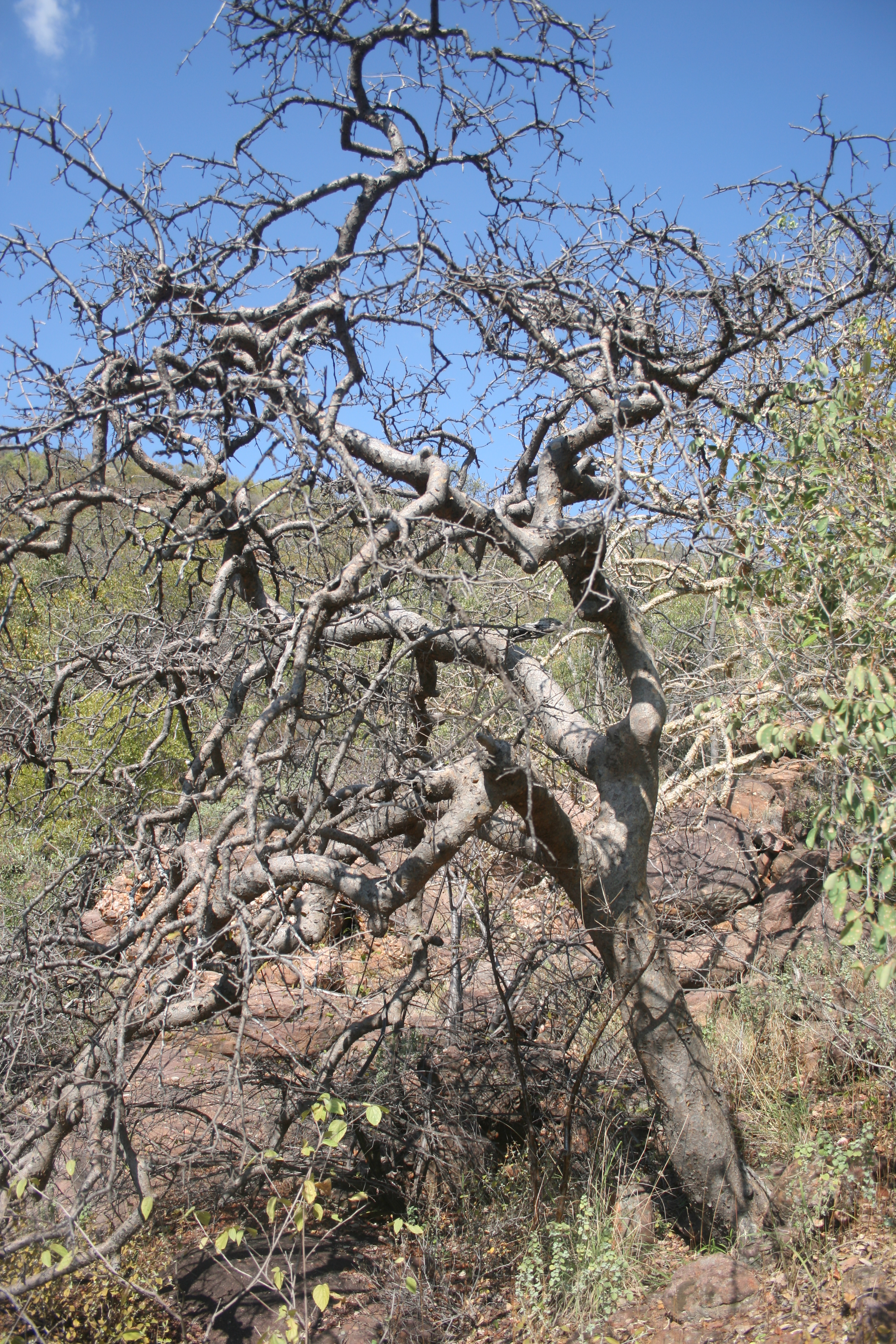
Commiphora mollis
