= Myrrh =

Aromatic resin from the Commiphora myrrha tree

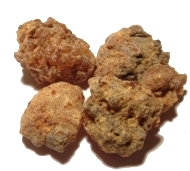
Myrrh resin

Myrrh (Note: Pronounced /mɜːr/ MUR; from an unidentified ancient Semitic language, such as Arabic مُرّ (murr) or Hebrew מור/מֹר (mōr); see § Etymology.) is a gum-resin extracted from a few small, thorny tree species of the Commiphora genus, belonging to the Burseraceae family.

Myrrh resin was traded in the ancient world, and has been used throughout history in medicine, in ritual, and to make perfume and incense. Its use is mentioned in the Hebrew Bible, the New Testament and in Islamic texts, as well as by ancient historians. It is still used by certain Christian denominations for ritual purposes.

== Etymology ==
The word myrrh corresponds to a common Semitic root m-r-r meaning 'bitter', as in Hebrew מַר mar, Arabic مُرّ murr and Neo-Aramaic ܡܲܪܝܼܪܵܐ marīrā. Its name entered the English language by way of the Hebrew Bible, in which it is called מור/מֹר mōr, and also later as a Semitic loanword. It appears in numerous pre-Hellenic sources up to the translation of the Tanakh into the Septuagint, and later makes its way into the Greek myth about Myrrha; in the Ancient Greek language, the related word μῠ́ρον múron, likely derived from a Semitic source, became a general term for perfume.

== Extraction and production ==
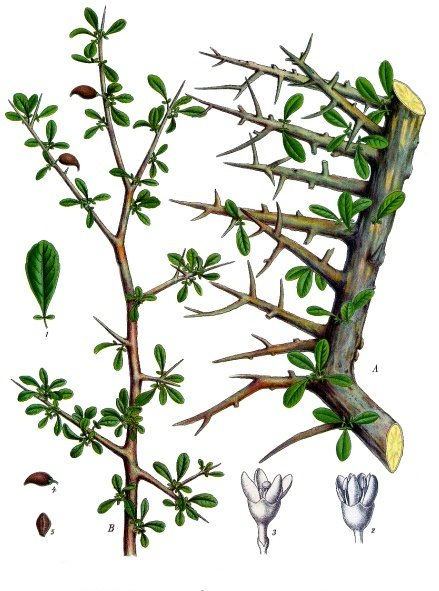
Commiphora myrrha tree, one of the primary trees from which myrrh is harvested

When a cut on a tree penetrates through the bark and into the sapwood, the tree secretes a resin. Myrrh gum, like frankincense, is such a resin. Myrrh is harvested by repeatedly cutting the trees to bleed the gum, which is waxy and coagulates quickly. After the harvest, the gum becomes hard and glossy. The gum is yellowish and may be either clear or opaque. It darkens deeply as it ages, and white streaks emerge.

Myrrh gum is commonly harvested from trees of the genus Commiphora. It is commonly extracted from the species Commiphora myrrha, Commiphora africana, Commiphora erythraea, Commiphora gileadensis, Commiphora habessinica, Commiphora hodai, Commiphora quadricincta, Commiphora schimperi, and Commiphora truncata.

Commiphora myrrha is native to Somaliland, Somalia, Oman, Yemen, Eritrea, Somali Region of Ethiopia and parts of Saudi Arabia. Meetiga, a trade name for Arabian myrrh, is gummier and more brittle than the Somali variety and does not have the latter's white markings.

Liquid myrrh, or stacte, which was written about by Pliny, was formerly a greatly valued ingredient and is commercially available as Jewish Incense.

== Attributed medicinal properties ==
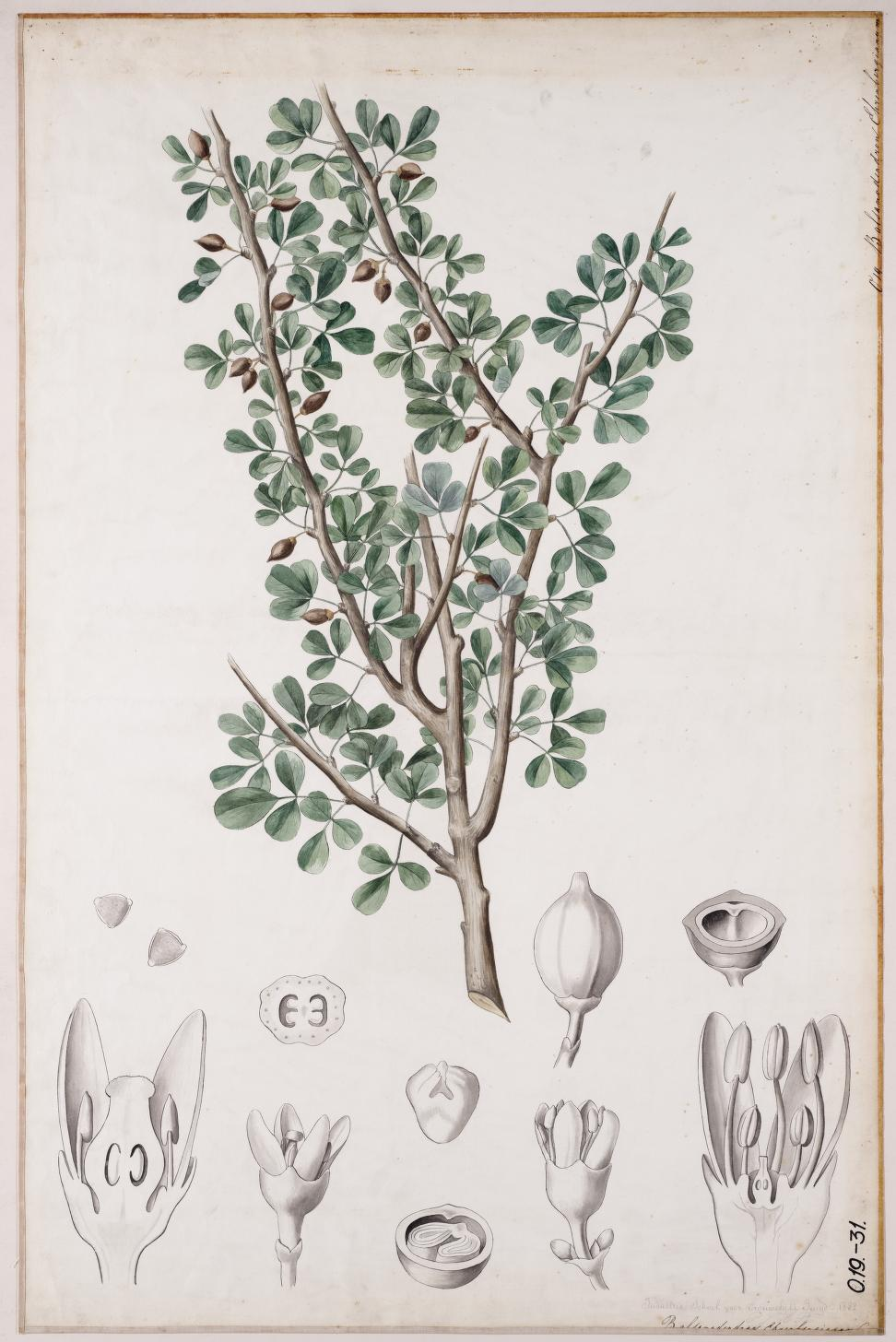
Commiphora gileadensis (listed as "Balsamodendron ehrenbergianum")

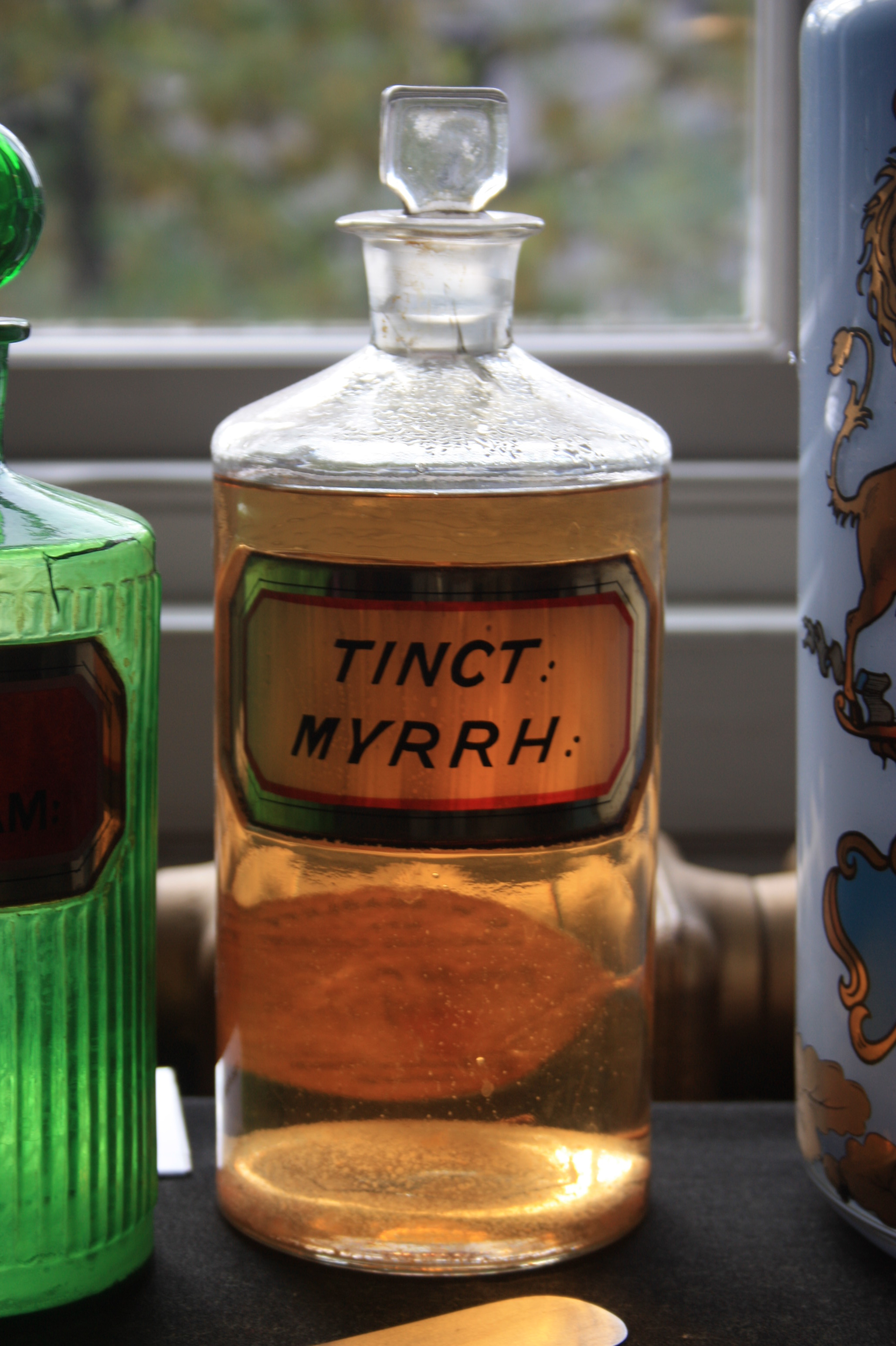
An old bottle of Tincture of Myrrh

In pharmacology, myrrh has been used as an antiseptic in mouthwashes, gargles, and toothpastes. It has also been used in liniments and salves applied to abrasions and other minor skin ailments. Myrrh has been used as an analgesic for toothache pain and in liniments applied to bruises, aching muscles, and sprains.

Myrrh gum has often been claimed to reduce the symptoms of indigestion, ulcers, colds, cough, asthma, respiratory congestion, arthritis, and cancer, although more good scientific evidence is needed to support these uses. There is evidence to suggest certain compounds in myrrh interact with central opioid pathways in the brain.

Myrrh mixed with posca or wine was widely used in many ancient cultures to produce pleasurable feelings and as an anti-inflammatory and analgesic.

== Religious ritual ==
=== In Ancient Egypt and Punt (Horn of Africa) ===
The 5th-dynasty ruler of Egypt, King Sahure, recorded the earliest attested expedition to the land of Punt, the modern day Horn of Africa (particularly Somalia), whose members brought back large quantities of myrrh, frankincense, malachite and electrum. The expedition also brought back wild animals (particularly cheetahs), a secretary bird (Sagittarius serpentarius), giraffes and Hamadryas baboons (which were sacred to the Ancient Egyptians), ebony, ivory and animal skins. In a relief from his mortuary temple celebrating the success of this expedition, Sahure is shown tending a myrrh tree in the garden of his palace. The relief, entitled "Sahure's splendor soars up to heaven", is the only one in Egyptian art that depicts a king gardening. Myrrh was used by the ancient Egyptians, along with natron, for the embalming of mummies.

=== In the Hebrew Bible ===
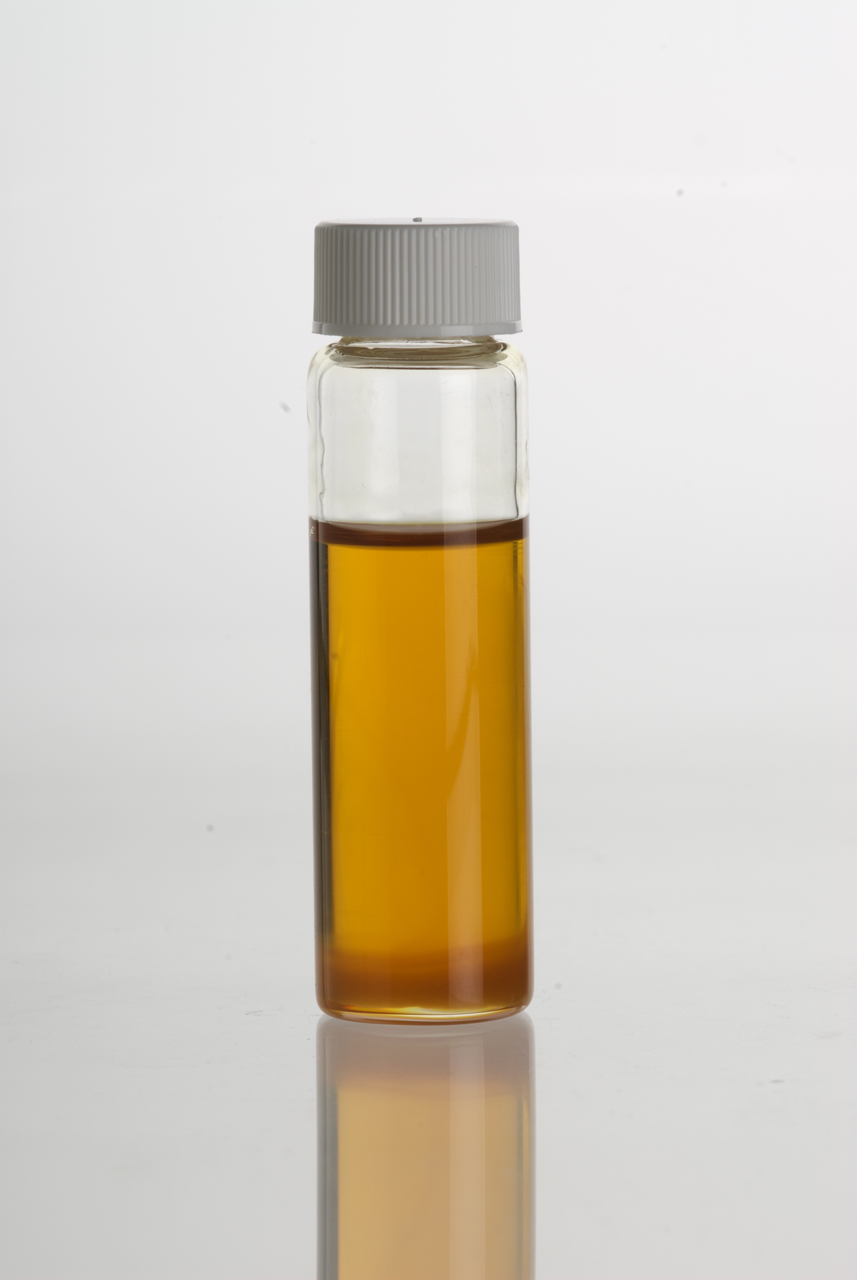
An essential oil extracted from myrrh (Commiphora myrrha)

Myrrh is mentioned as a rare perfume in several places in the Hebrew Bible. In Genesis 37:25, the traders to whom Jacob's sons sold their brother Joseph had "camels ... loaded with spices, balm, and myrrh," and Exodus 30:23–25 specifies that Moses was to use 500 shekels of liquid myrrh as a core ingredient of the sacred anointing oil.

Myrrh was an ingredient of Ketoret: the consecrated incense used in the First and Second Temples at Jerusalem, as described in the Hebrew Bible and Talmud. An offering was made of the Ketoret on a special incense altar and was an important component of the temple service. Myrrh is also listed as an ingredient in the holy anointing oil used to anoint the tabernacle, high priests and kings.

Oil of myrrh is used in Esther 2:12 in a purification ritual for the new queen to King Ahasuerus:

Now when every maid's turn was come to go in to king Ahasuerus, after that she had been twelve months, according to the manner of the women, (for so were the days of their purifications accomplished, to wit, six months with oil of myrrh, and six months with sweet odours, and with other things for the purifying of the women).

=== In ancient Nabataea ===
Myrrh was recorded in the first century BC by Diodorus Siculus to have been traded overland and by sea via Nabatean caravans and sea ports, which transported it from Southern Arabia to their capital city of Petra, from which it was distributed throughout the Mediterranean region.

Petra's strategic position on the Incense Route allowed the Nabataeans to control the trade, establishing taxation mechanisms for the valuable aromatics.

=== In the New Testament ===
Myrrh is mentioned in the New Testament as one of the three gifts (with gold and frankincense) that the magi "from the East" presented to the Christ Child (Matthew 2, Matthew 2:11). Myrrh was also present at Jesus' death and burial. Jesus was offered wine and myrrh at his crucifixion (Mark 15, Mark 15:23). According to John's Gospel, Nicodemus and Joseph of Arimathea brought a 100-pound mixture of myrrh and aloes to wrap Jesus' body (John 19, John 19:39). The Gospel of Matthew relates that as Jesus went to the cross, he was given vinegar to drink mingled with gall: and when he had tasted thereof, he would not drink (Matthew 27:34); the Gospel of Mark describes the drink as wine mingled with myrrh (Mark 15:23).

=== In contemporary Christianity ===
Because of its mention in the New Testament, myrrh is an incense offered during some Christian liturgical celebrations (see Thurible). Liquid myrrh is sometimes added to egg tempera in the making of icons. Myrrh is mixed with frankincense and sometimes more scents and is used in the Eastern Orthodox, Oriental Orthodox, traditional Roman Catholic, and Anglican/Episcopal churches.

Myrrh is also used to prepare the sacramental chrism used by many churches of both Eastern and Western rites. In the Middle East, the Eastern Orthodox Church traditionally uses oil scented with myrrh (and other fragrances) to perform the sacrament of chrismation, which is commonly referred to as "receiving the Chrism".

=== In Islam ===
According to the hadith of Muhammad, narrated by Abu Nuaim on the authority of Abban bin Saleh bin Anas, Muhammad said, "Fumigate your houses with mugwort, myrrh and thyme." (Kanz-ul-Ummal). The Encyclopedia of Islamic Herbal Medicine mentions the same hadith: "The Messenger of Allah stated, 'Fumigate your houses with al-shih, murr, and sa'tar.'" The author states that this use of the word "murr" refers specifically to Commiphora myrrha. The other two are Al-Shih (possibly mugwort) and Sa'tar (or Za'atar - thyme).

== Ancient myrrh ==
Pedanius Dioscorides described the myrrh of the first century AD as most likely to refer to a "species of mimosa", describing it "like the Egyptian thorn". He describes its appearance and leaf structure as "spinnate-winged".

== Other products that can be confused with myrrh ==
The oleo-gum-resins of a number of other Commiphora species are also used as perfumes, medicines (such as aromatic wound dressings), and incense ingredients. These myrrh-like resins are known as bdellium (including guggul and African bdellium), balsam (balm of Gilead or Mecca balsam) and opopanax (bisabol).

Fragrant "myrrh beads" are made from the crushed seeds of Detarium microcarpum, an unrelated West African tree. These beads are traditionally worn by married women in Mali as multiple strands around the hips.

The name "myrrh" is also applied to the potherb Myrrhis odorata, otherwise known as "cicely" or "sweet cicely".

== See also ==
- Bdellium
- Chrism
- Frankincense
- Myroblyte saint
- Naturalis Historia
- Pliny the Elder
