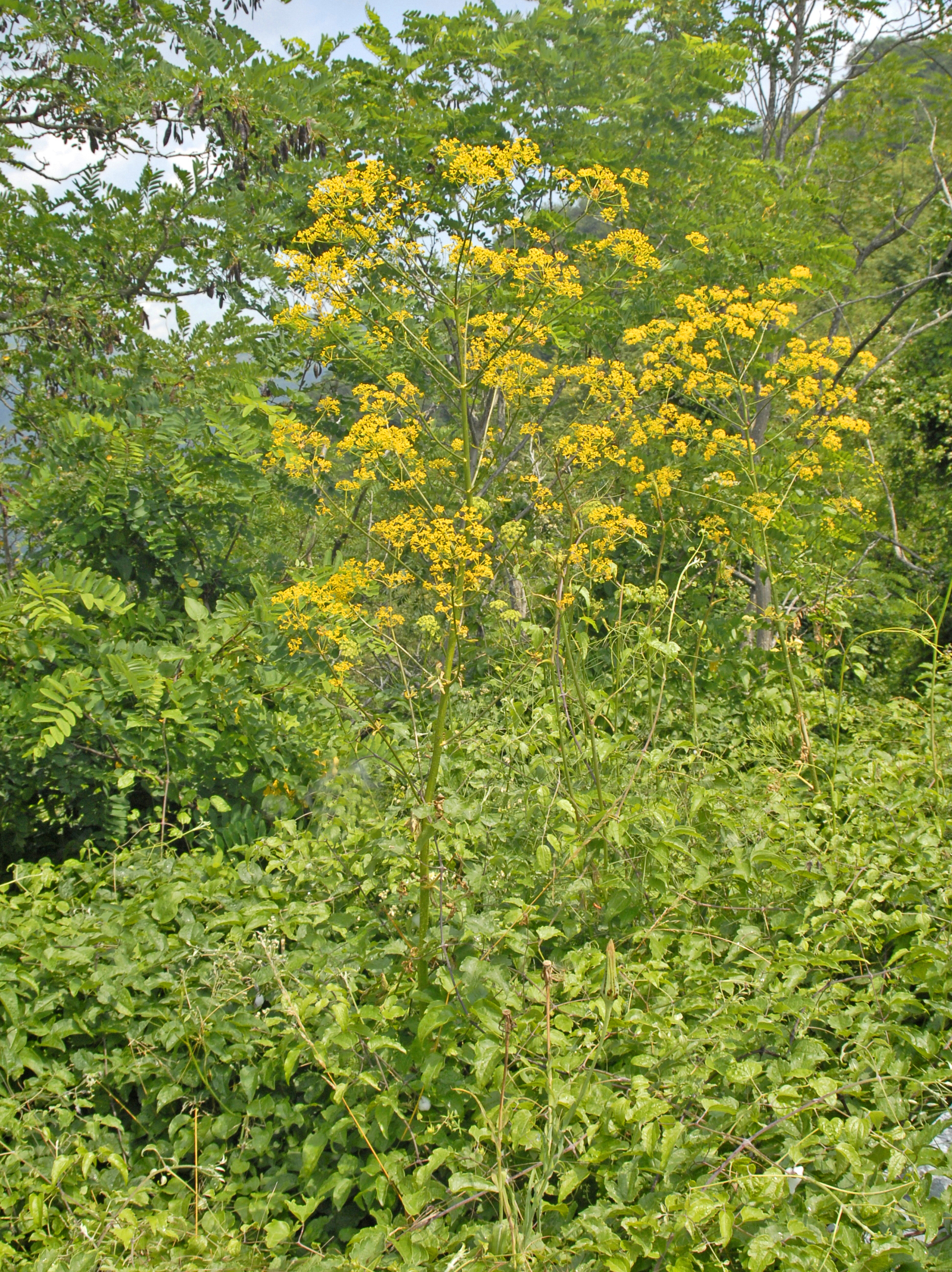
- Opopanax chironium

Scientific classification
- Kingdom: Plantae
- Clade: Tracheophytes
- Clade: Angiosperms
- Clade: Eudicots
- Clade: Asterids
- Order: Apiales
- Family: Apiaceae
- Genus: Opopanax
- Species: O. chironium

Binomial name
- Opopanax chironium (L.) W.D.J.Koch

Synonyms
- List: Dorema chironium (L.) M.Hiroe; Laserpitium chironium L.; Malabaila opoponax Baill.; Malabaila orientalis Benth. & Hook.f. ex Arcang.; Maspeton chironium (L.) Raf.; Opopanax bulgaricus Velen.; Opopanax chironium subsp. bulgaricus (Velen.) N.Andreev; Opopanax glaber Bernh.; Opopanax opopanax (L.) H.Karst., not validly publ.; Pastinaca altissima Lam.; Pastinaca opopanax L.; Peucedanum opopanax (L.) M.Hiroe; Selinum opopanax (L.) Crantz; Siler chironium Crantz

= Opopanax chironium =

Species of flowering plant

Opopanax chironium, common name Hercules' all-heal, is a herb of the family Apiaceae.

== Description ==
Opopanax chironium grows 1–3 metres (3 feet 3 inches – 9 feet 10 inches) high. This perennial herb has a branching stem, thick and rough close to the base. Leaves are serrate, pinnate, with long petioles. It produces a large, flat, yellow inflorescence at the top of the branches.

== Distribution and habitat ==
The plant thrives in warm climates like Iran, Italy, Greece and Turkey, but also grows in cooler climates.

== Uses ==
A gum resin (mostly gum) can be extracted from this plant by cutting at the base of a stem and sun-drying the juice that flows out. It has a strong unpleasant odor, unlike the perfumery's opopanax which is aromatic.

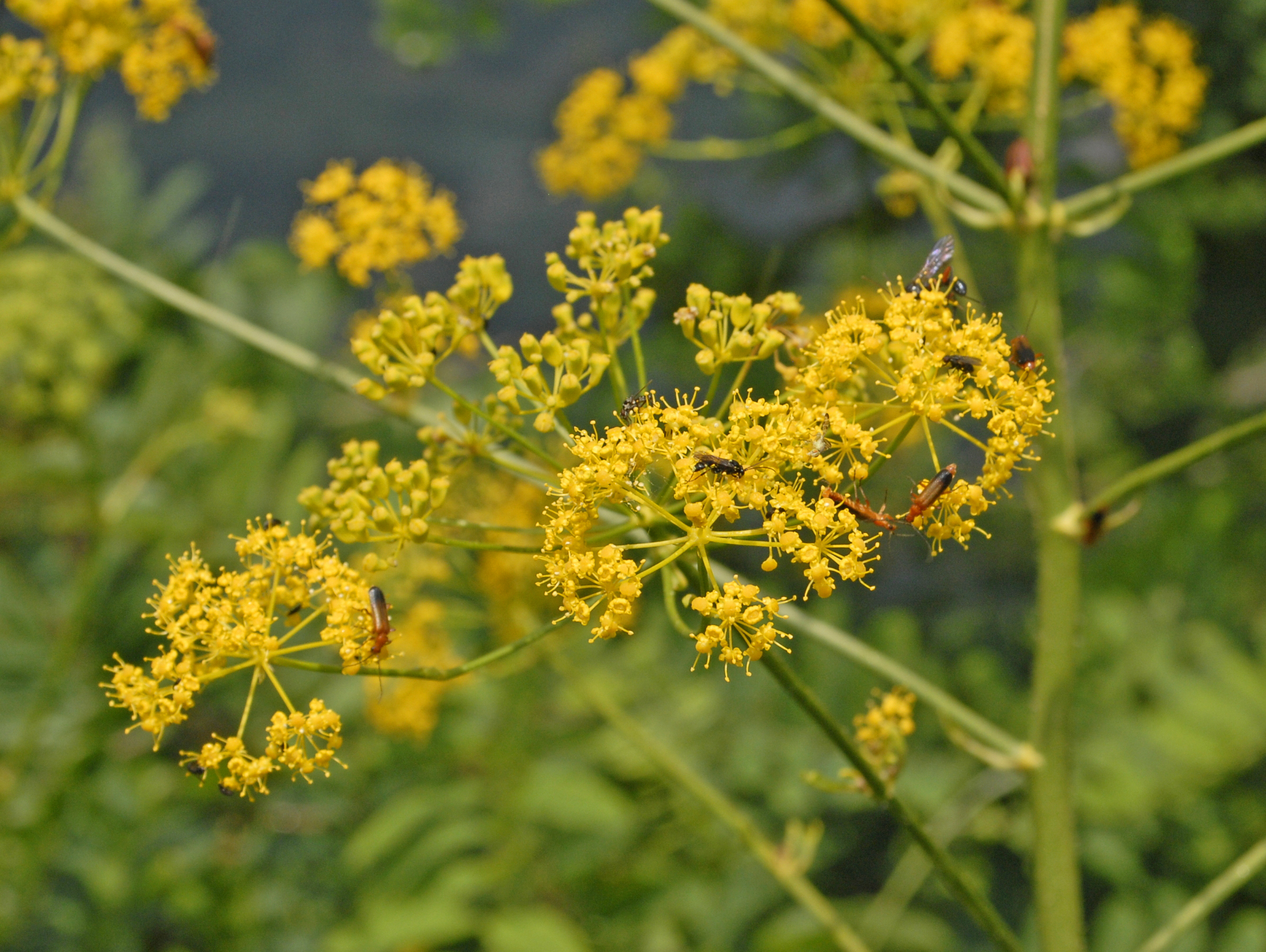
Flowers of Opopanax chironium

The resin has been used in the treatment of spasms, and, before that, as an emmenagogue, in the treatment of asthma, chronic visceral infections, hysteria and hypochondria. Opopanax resin is most frequently sold in dried irregular pieces, though tear-shaped gems are not uncommon.
