= Commiphora kataf =

Scientific classification
- Kingdom: Plantae
- Clade: Tracheophytes
- Clade: Angiosperms
- Clade: Eudicots
- Clade: Rosids
- Order: Sapindales
- Family: Burseraceae
- Genus: Commiphora
- Species: C. kataf

Binomial name
- Commiphora kataf (Forssk.) Engl.

Synonyms
- List: Amyris kataf Forssk.; Balsamea erythraea (Ehrenb.) Engl.; Balsamea kataf (Forssk.) Engl.; Balsamodendrum kataf (Forssk.) Kunth ex DC.; Balsamophloeos kataf (Forssk.) O.Berg; Commiphora allophylla Sprague; Commiphora erythraea (Ehrenb.) Engl.; Commiphora holtziana Engl.; Commiphora holtziana subsp. microphylla J.B.Gillett; Commiphora kataf subsp. turkanensis J.B.Gillett; Commiphora somalensis Engl.; Hemprichia erythraea Ehrenb.

Species of plant

Commiphora kataf is a species of flowering plant in the family Burseraceae, native to northeastern and eastern tropical Africa, and the southwestern Arabian Peninsula. A relative of myrrh, local peoples plant this shrubby tree as a resinous hedge that repels wildlife.
