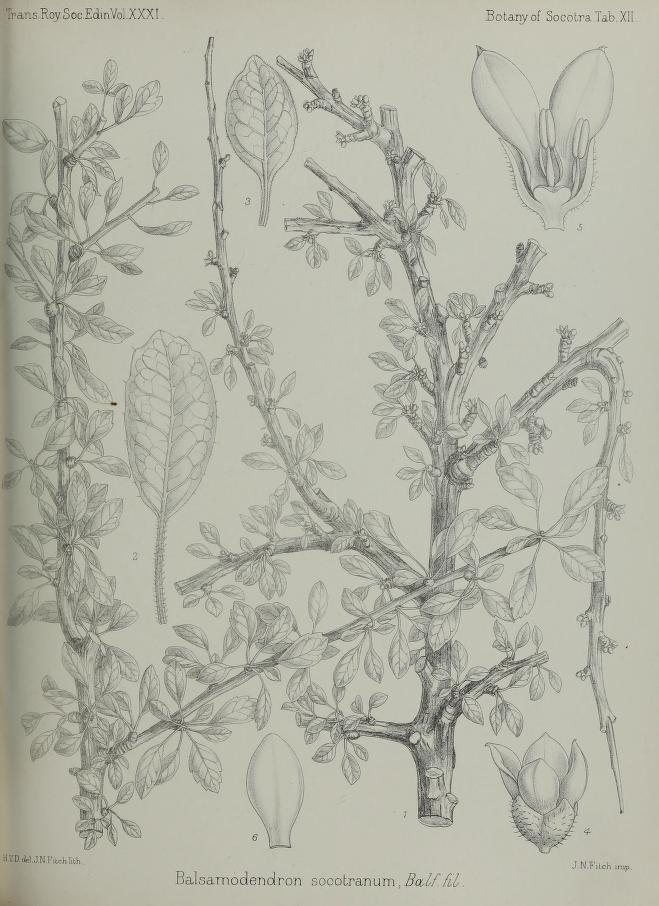
- Botanical illustration

Conservation status
- Near Threatened (IUCN 3.1)

Scientific classification
- Kingdom: Plantae
- Clade: Tracheophytes
- Clade: Angiosperms
- Clade: Eudicots
- Clade: Rosids
- Order: Sapindales
- Family: Burseraceae
- Genus: Commiphora
- Species: C. socotrana

Binomial name
- Commiphora socotrana (Balf.f.) Engl.

Synonyms
- Balsamodendrum socotranum Balf.f.

= Commiphora socotrana =

Species of plant

Commiphora socotrana is a species of flowering plant in the incense tree family Burseraceae, native to Socotra. A shrub or small tree, it is dominant in the laakam myrrh tree shrubland and is found in many other woodland and shrubland biotopes.
