= Alphonse Révillon d'Apreval =

French botanical illustrator and lithographer

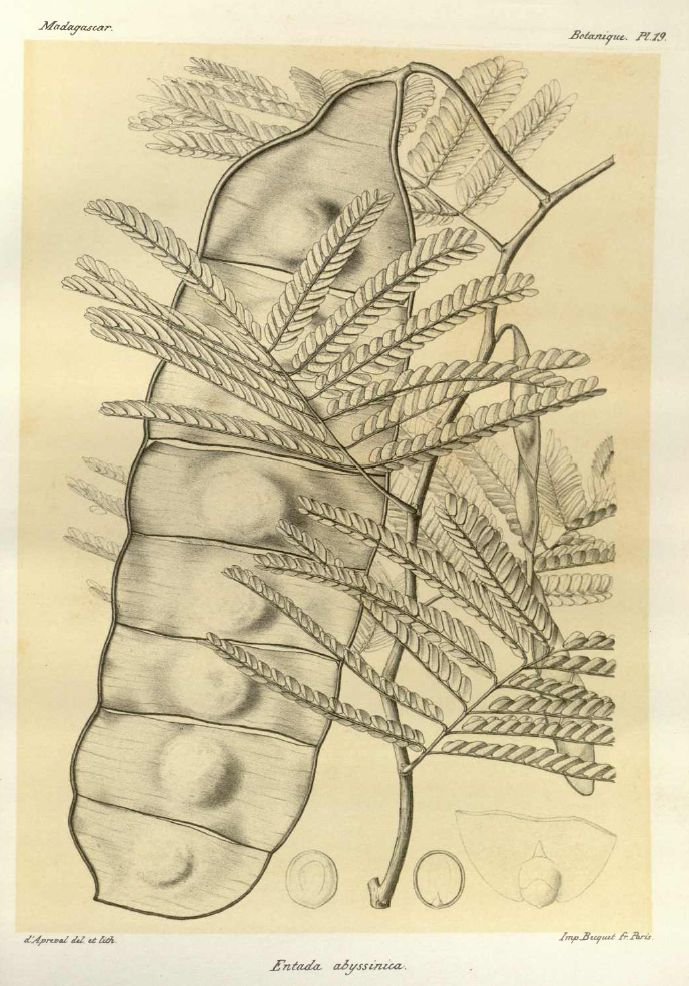
Entada abyssinica

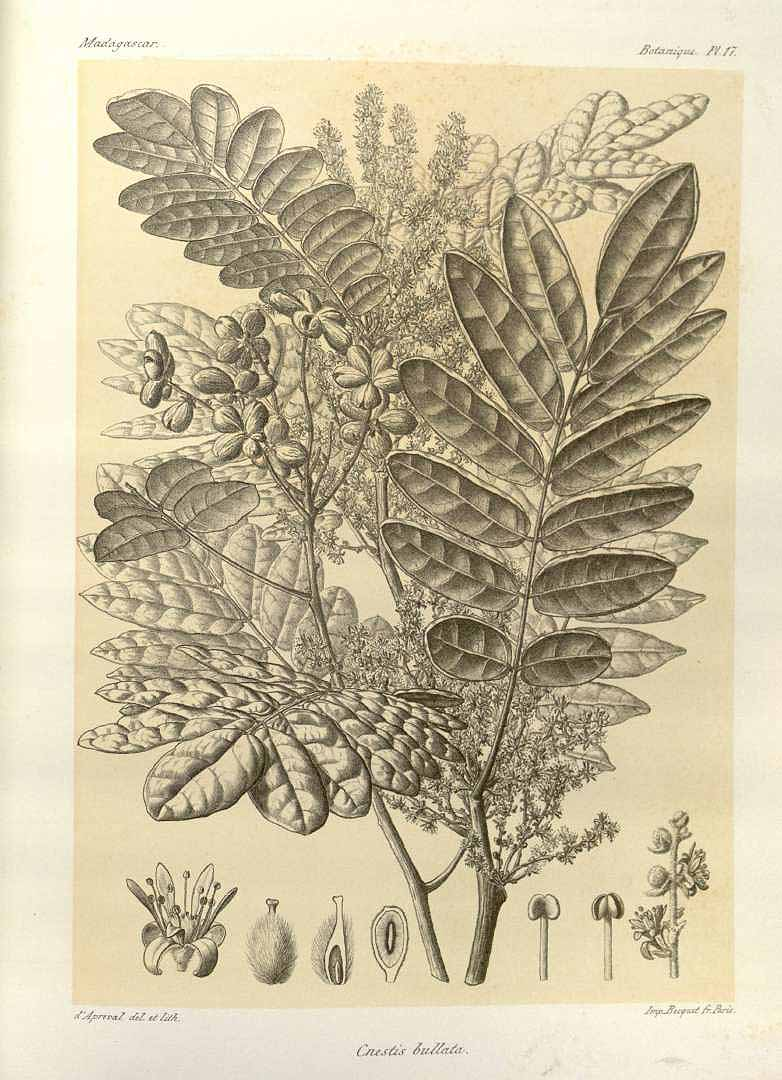
Cnestis polyphylla

Alphonse Gustave Révillon d'Apreval (1 November 1851 – 22 February 1915) was a French botanical illustrator and lithographer, known for his images in Plantae Davidianae (1884–88), Illustrationes Florae Insularum Maris Pacifici (1886–92) and Histoire physique, naturelle et politique de Madagascar (1882). Henri Ernest Baillon, the French physician and botanist, and main contributor to Histoire physique, naturelle et politique de Madagascar, named a new genus d'Aprevalia after him in 1884, no doubt in honour of his illustrating the work, but the name was later placed under Delonix by René Paul Raymond Capuron. A number of species such as Commiphora aprevalii (Baill.) Guillaumin, were named to commemorate him.

Born in Paris, d'Apreval died in Alfortville, Val-de-Marne.

== Associated names ==
- Émile De Wildeman (1866–1947) Botanist
- Théophile Durand (1855–1912) Botanist
- Charles Cuisin (1832–1900) Illustrator
- Berthe Hérincq Illustrator
- Philippe Dautzenberg (1849–1935) Malacologist
- Victor De Clèves Botanist

== Works illustrated ==
- Histoire physique, naturelle et politique de Madagascar (1882)
- Plantae Davidianae ex Sinarum imperio (1884–88)
- Illustrationes florae insularum maris pacifici (1886-1892)
- Illustrations de la flore du Congo by E. de Wildeman (1898)
- Plantae Novae vel Minus Cognitae ex herbario Horti Thenensis (1904)
- Atlas de poche des coquilles des côtes de France (Manche, océan, Méditerranée) communes, pittoresques ou comestibles by Ph Dautzenberg (2014)
- Tableau des principaux champignons comestibles & veneneux by Paul Dumée
- Oeuvre de A. d'Apreval by A. d' Apreval
- Nouvelles Archives du Muséum d'Histoire Naturelle, Paris
