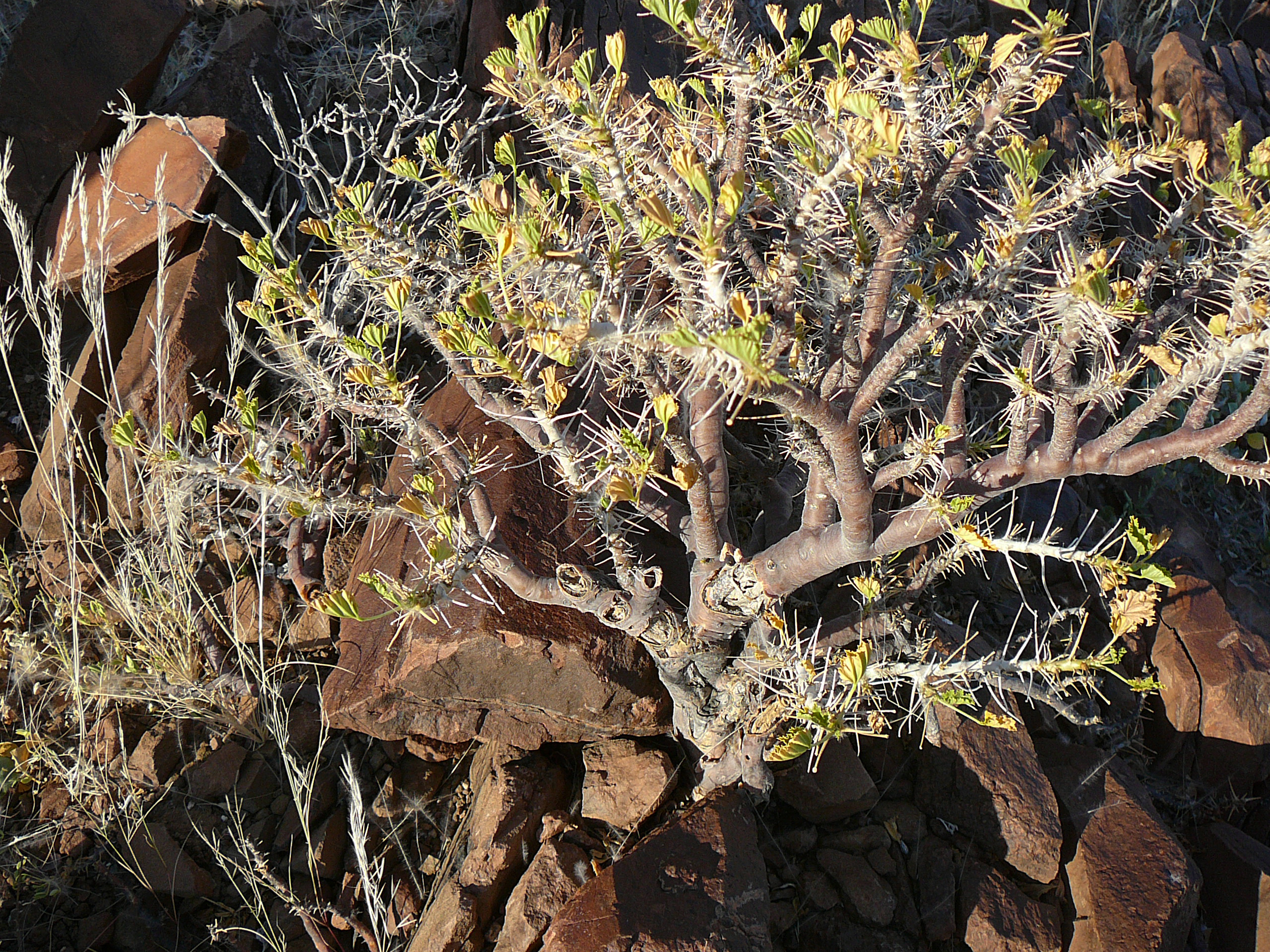
- Commiphora saxicola - MHNT

Scientific classification
- Kingdom: Plantae
- Clade: Tracheophytes
- Clade: Angiosperms
- Clade: Eudicots
- Clade: Rosids
- Order: Sapindales
- Family: Burseraceae
- Genus: Commiphora
- Species: C. saxicola

Binomial name
- Commiphora saxicola Engl.

= Commiphora saxicola =

Species of shrub

Commiphora saxicola, also known as rock corkwood, is a shrub species in the genus Commiphora endemic to, and protected in, Namibia. It grows on rock slopes and in gravel plains in an area reaching from the Kunene River south to Helmeringhausen.

The rock corkwood is known in local languages as Afrikaans: rotskanniedood, German: Felsenmyrrhe, Felsenbalsambaum, and Otjiherero: Omumdomba. The resin of the shrub smells sweet and is used as a thirst suppressant by the Topnaar people. The fruit is edible.
