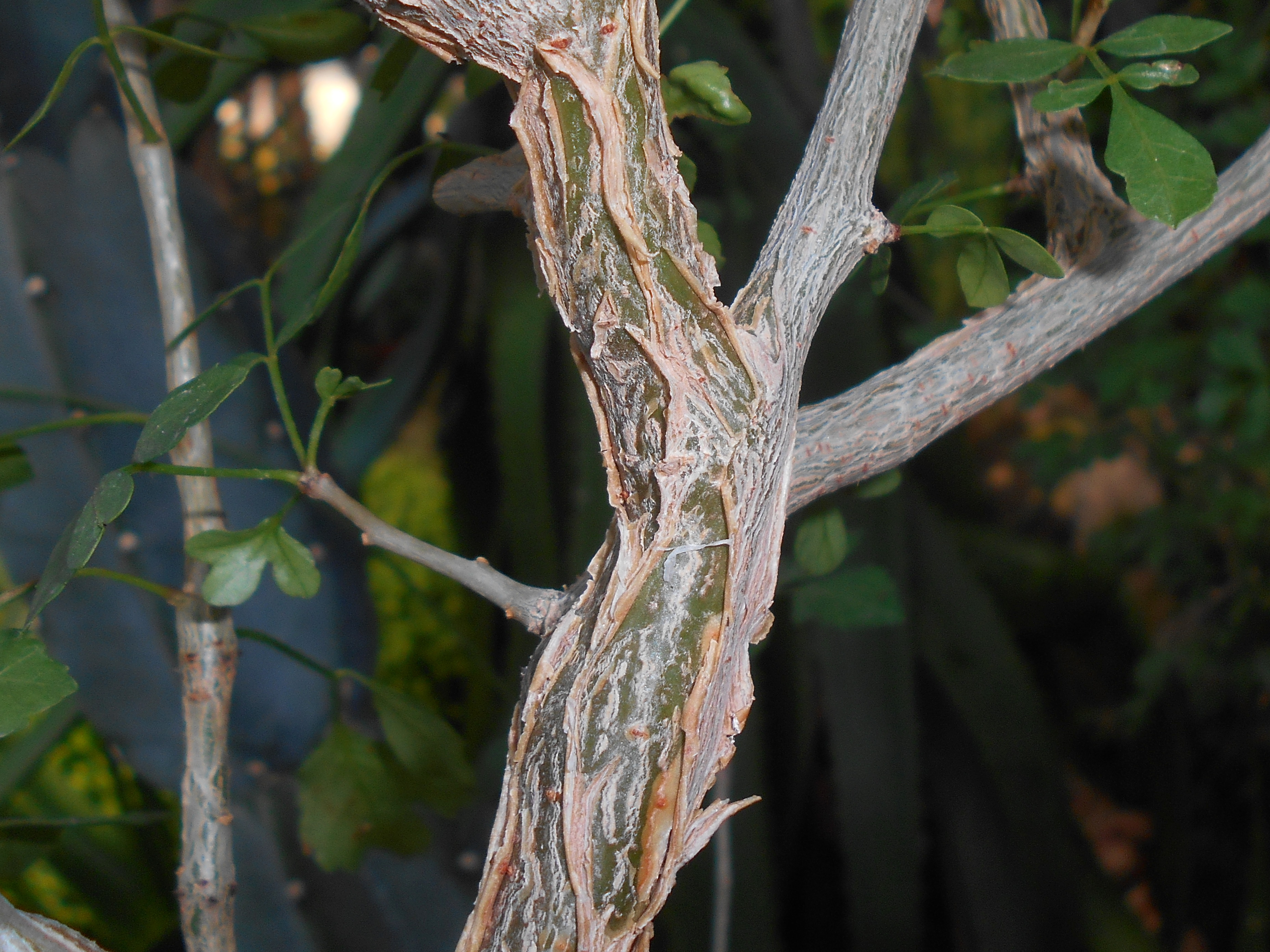
- Peeling bark on the Commiphora habessinica

Scientific classification
- Kingdom: Plantae
- Clade: Tracheophytes
- Clade: Angiosperms
- Clade: Eudicots
- Clade: Rosids
- Order: Sapindales
- Family: Burseraceae
- Genus: Commiphora
- Species: C. kua

Binomial name
- Commiphora kua (R.Br. ex Royle) Vollesen (1984)

Synonyms
- List: Amyris kafal Forssk. (1775); Balsamea abyssinica Engl. (1880); Balsamea habessinica (O.Berg) Engl. (1880); Balsamodendrum abyssinicum Engl. (1880); Balsamodendrum africanum var. habessinicum (O.Berg) Oliv. (1868); Balsamodendrum habessinicum O.Berg (1862); Balsamodendrum kafal (Forssk.) Kunth ex DC. (1825); Balsamodendrum kua R.Br. ex Royle (1847); Balsamus kafal (Forssk.) Stackh. (1815); Commiphora abyssinica (Engl.) Engl. (1883); Commiphora assaortensis Chiov. (1932); Commiphora atramentaria Chiov. (1932); Commiphora bruceae Chiov. (1941); Commiphora candidula Sprague (1927); Commiphora crenulata (A.Terracc.) Chiov. (1915); Commiphora dancaliensis Chiov.; Commiphora ellenbeckii Engl. (1904); Commiphora flaviflora Engl. (1904); Commiphora gowlello Sprague (1927); Commiphora gracilispina J.B.Gillett (1991); Commiphora habessinica (O.Berg) Engl. (1883); Commiphora habessinica var. crenulata A.Terracc. (1894); Commiphora habessinica var. simplicifolia Schweinf. (1899); Commiphora habessinica subsp. tanganyikensis J.B.Gillett (1991); Commiphora incisa Chiov. (1916); Commiphora kua var. gowlello (Sprague) J.B.Gillett (1991); Commiphora lindensis Engl. (1904); Commiphora salubris Engl. (1917); Commiphora subsessilifolia Engl. (1904)

= Commiphora kua =

Species of flowering plant

Commiphora kua, sometimes known as Abyssinian myrrh or the Yemen myrrh, is a plant native to northeast Africa and the Arabian Peninsula, including Djibouti, Eritrea, Ethiopia, Zambia, Malawi, Oman and Yemen. It was first described as Balsamodendrum kua in 1847, and has many botanical synonyms. It can be recognised by its simple, serrate leaves and by the pseudo aril, covering the seed, which has four almost linear arm-like lobes.

== Description ==
Commiphora kua is a widespread species and it varies greatly in appearance between drier areas and those most affected by the monsoon. The plant varies dramatically from low, spiny shrubs with small leaves in the drier areas to medium size, unarmed trees with a distinct trunk and large leaves in areas affected by the monsoon. It is dioecious, with bark peeling of flaking and when cut it oozes a pleasant smelling resin. The leaves alternate or are fascicled on short condensed side shoots. The leaves are 10-50mm long x 5-40mm across with an acute tip and glossy green colour. The flowers are red or yellow and there are usually 1–5 on the side shoots amongst the leaves. Male and female flowers are similar but male flowers are usually in groups whereas female flowers are usually solitary. The fruit is ovoid, 7-9 x 4-6mm, green and red coloured and 1-seeded splitting into 2 valves. The seed is orange or pale yellow with 4-lobed pseudo aril.

== Traditional uses ==
The resin, also called myrrh of Commiphora kua, was used in traditional medicine in Arabia. A small quantity would be painted over the body area to be treated.

Commiphora kua is also edible. A young plant with the root peeled and chewed produces a sweet, refreshing liquid. After monsoons or rainstorms, the Commiphora habbesinica produces a sugary liquid. The plant can then be cut in cross sections and sucked for its fluid.
