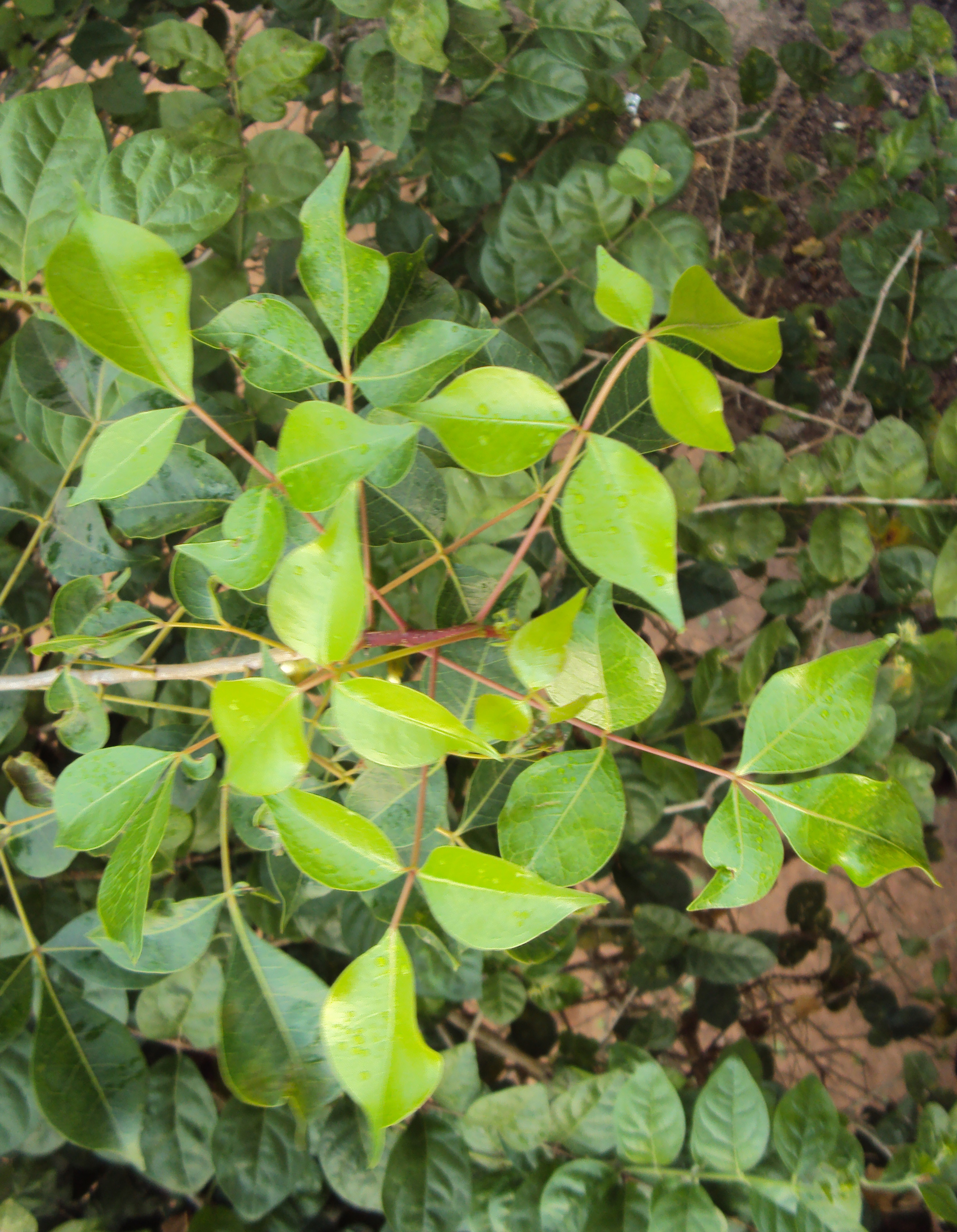

Scientific classification
- Kingdom: Plantae
- Clade: Tracheophytes
- Clade: Angiosperms
- Clade: Eudicots
- Clade: Rosids
- Order: Sapindales
- Family: Burseraceae
- Genus: Commiphora
- Species: C. caudata

Binomial name
- Commiphora caudata (Wight & Arn.) Engl.

Synonyms
- Balsamea caudata (Wight & Arn.) Engl.; Balsamodendrum caudatum (Wight & Arn.) Marchand; Protionopsis caudata (Wight & Arn.) Blume; Protium caudatum Wight & Arn.

= Commiphora caudata =

Hill mango

Species of flowering plant

Commiphora caudata, the hill mango or green commiphora, is the most abundant Asian species of the genus Commiphora of flowering plants in the family Burseraceae. It is native to Southern India and Sri Lanka, usually growing in the full sun on hilly granite rock outcrops in dry zone areas. It is a small to medium-sized deciduous tree which may reach a height of 10-20m, but usually less. The tree has a smooth, succulent green bark, which partly flakes off with age, giving rise to a characteristic patchwork of green and brown patches. Its sap has a strong resinous scent. The tree has medicinal properties. The fruit is a globose fleshy drupe with 2 to 6 valves and 1 seed that is black and has 4 wings. Remnants of branches can form a kind of thorns on the trunk. The flowers have a greenish to cream-yellow pedestal with pink to red petals.
