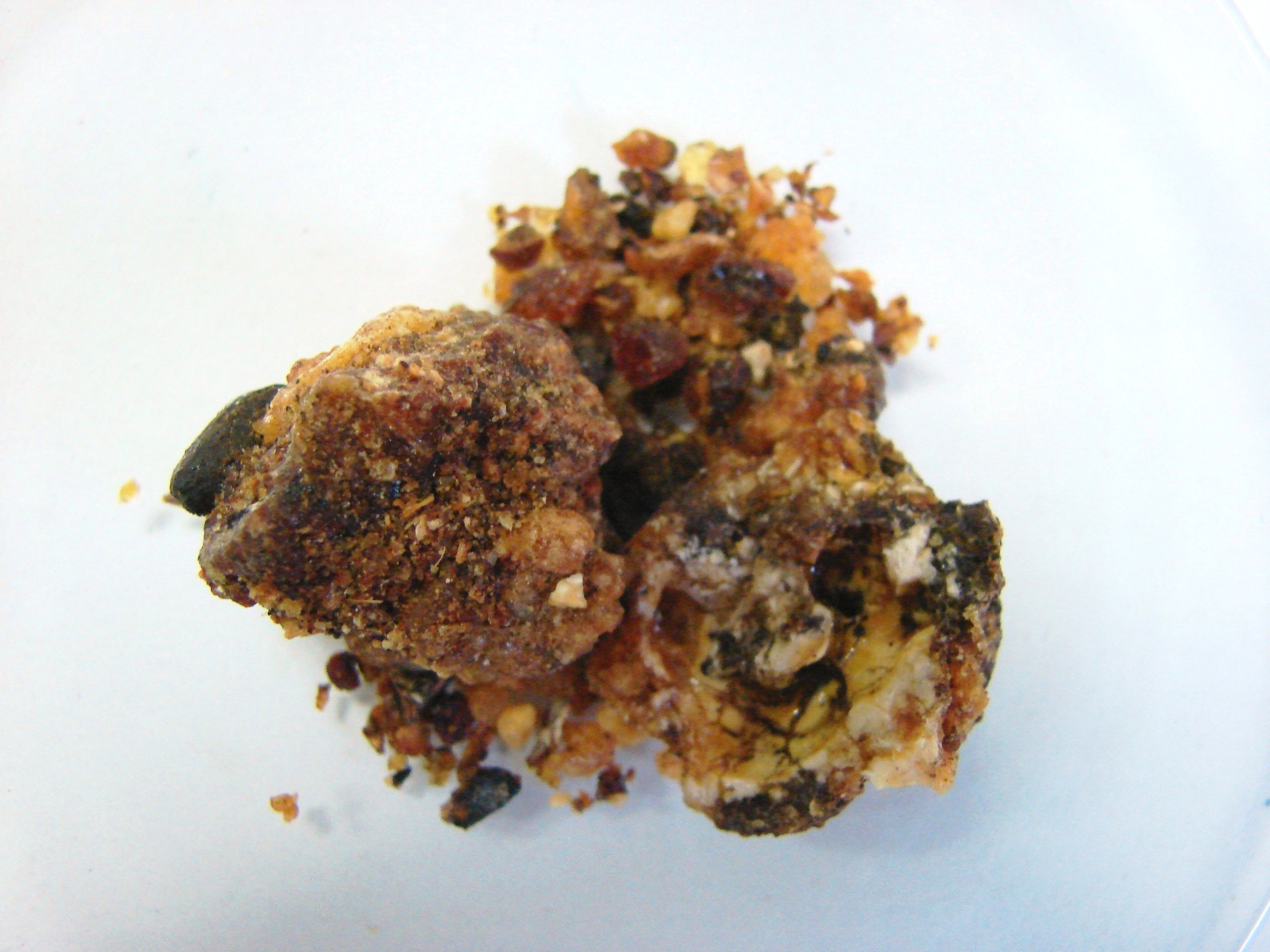
- The oleo-gum-resin of C. guidottii

Conservation status
- Vulnerable (IUCN 3.1)

Scientific classification
- Kingdom: Plantae
- Clade: Tracheophytes
- Clade: Angiosperms
- Clade: Eudicots
- Clade: Rosids
- Order: Sapindales
- Family: Burseraceae
- Genus: Commiphora
- Species: C. guidottii

Binomial name
- Commiphora guidottii Chiov. ex Guid.

Synonyms
- Commiphora sessiliflora Vollesen

= Commiphora guidottii =

Species of shrub

Commiphora guidottii, commonly known as scented myrrh or bisabol, is a tree or shrub species that is native to Somalia and Ethiopia. Essential oil from its oleo-gum-resin has been researched for its use in topical treatment of wounds.

== Distribution ==
Commiphora guidottii is native to two territories in the horn of Africa; the Ogaden region of eastern Ethiopia, and Somalia. The tree is widely known in the Bari, Bakool, Galguduud, Gedo, Mudug, and Nugal regions of Somali where to the locals it is known as hadi or habakhadi. The growth of the tree is associated with gypsum producing areas and in open bushland.

== Uses ==
Historically, the essential oils and gum resin of C. guidottii is an export commodity from Somaliland, but considered to be inferior in quality to the resin obtained from its sister species, C. myrrha. The shrub is sometimes mixed with the forage given to milk producing cows so as to improve the quantity and quality of milk.

== Conservation ==
Commiphora guidottii has been assessed as vulnerable on the IUCN Red List. It is threatened by over-harvesting for charcoal, by excessive extraction of its resin and by regional climate change. The species is very rare in Ethiopia.
