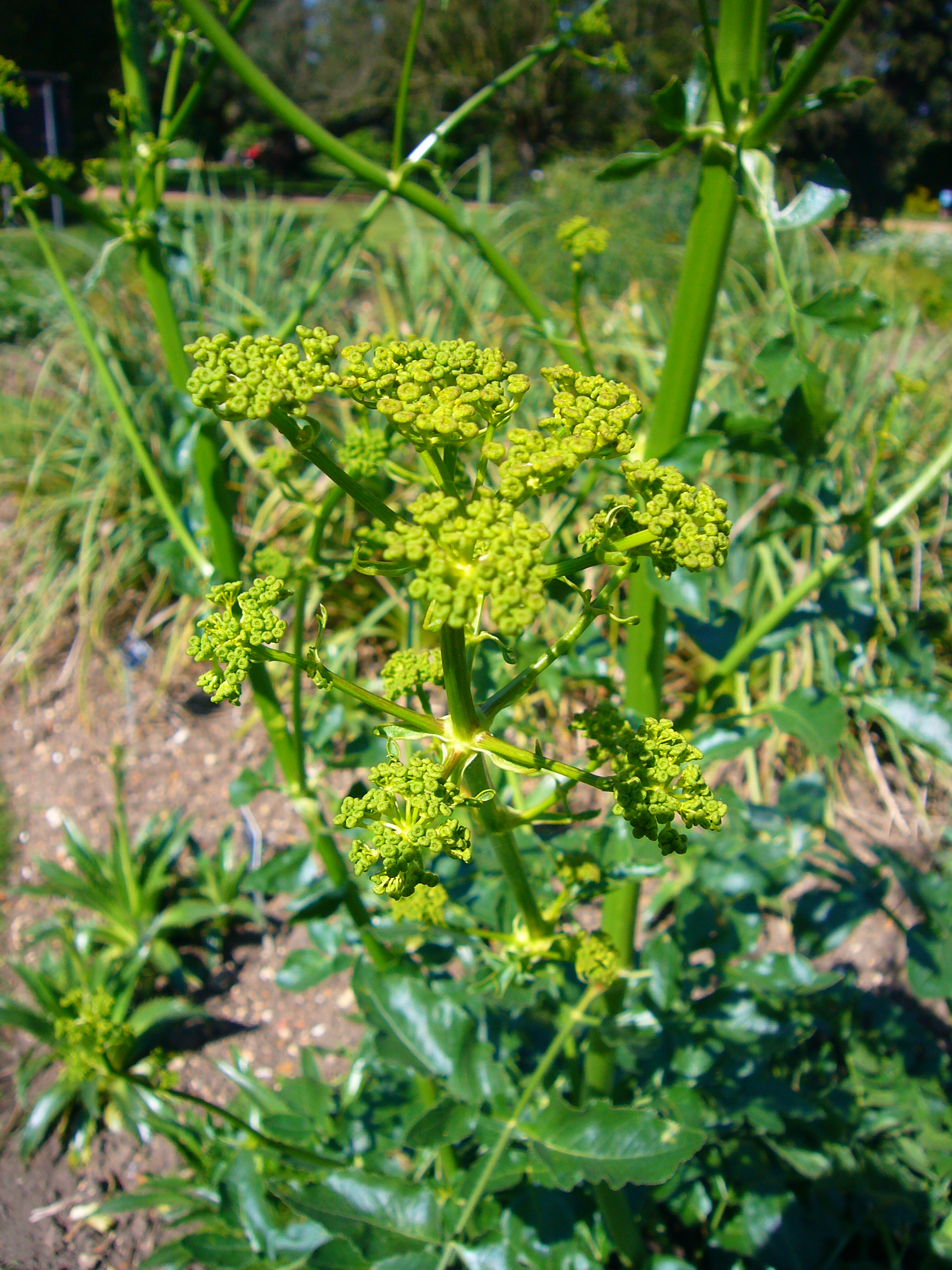
- Opopanax chironium

Scientific classification
- Kingdom: Plantae
- Clade: Tracheophytes
- Clade: Angiosperms
- Clade: Eudicots
- Clade: Asterids
- Order: Apiales
- Family: Apiaceae
- Subfamily: Apioideae
- Genus: Opopanax; W.D.J.Koch

Species
- See text

Synonyms
- Panax Hill, nom. illeg.; Crenosciadium Boiss. & Heldr.; Maspeton Raf.

= Opopanax (genus) =

Genus of flowering plants

Opopanax is a genus of plants in the family Apiaceae.

== Species ==
Opopanax includes four species:

- O. chironium (L.) W.D.J.Koch
- O. hispidus (Friv.) Griseb.
- O. persicus Boiss. & Heldr.
- O. siifolius (Boiss. & Heldr.) Menemen

== Etymology ==
The genus name Opopanax derives from Anglo-Norman opopanac, from Latin opopanax, from Hellenistic Greek ὀποπάναξ, from Ancient Greek ὀπός (opos, "juice") + πάναξ (panax, "all-healing"). Therefore, opopanax literally means the juice (gum resin) of all-heal. There were many different plants called all-heal (πάνακες or panaces) in Ancient Greece and Rome. However, according to Dioscorides, opopanax was obtained specifically from a kind of all-heal named πάνακες Ἡράκλειον (panaces Heraclion, "Hercules' all-heal"), which has been identified as Opopanax chironium, O. persicus and O. hispidus.

The term opopanax traditionally refers to the medicinal gum resin of Opopanax sp., but in perfumery, opopanax refers to the gum resin of an unrelated species Commiphora guidottii.

== Taxonomic history ==
The genus was created by Wilhelm Daniel Joseph Koch based on the species Opopanax chironium, previously known as Pastinaca opopanax L. and Ferula opopanax Spreng.
