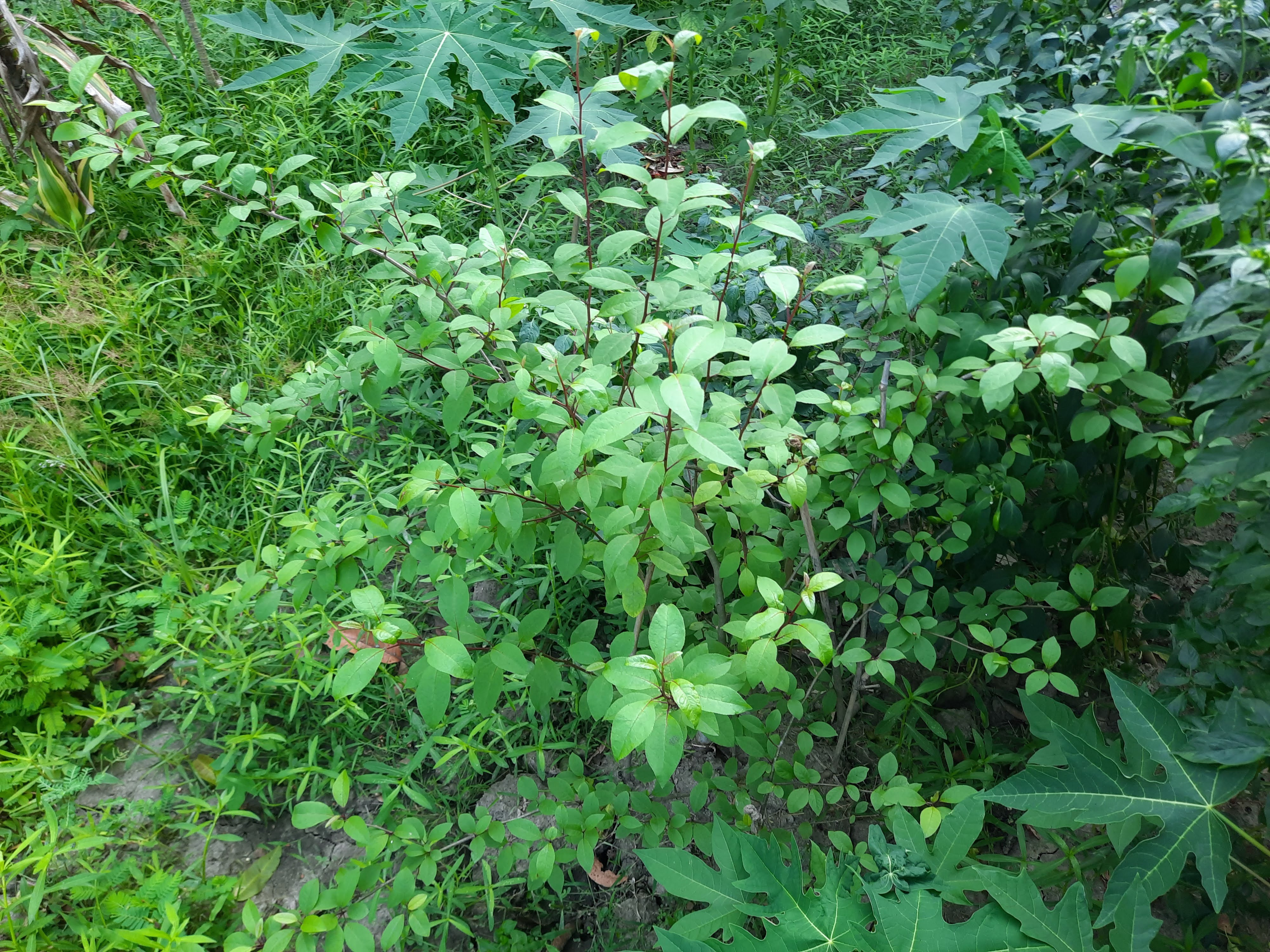
- Commiphora madagascariensis grown in West Bengal, India

Conservation status
- Near Threatened (IUCN 3.1)

Scientific classification
- Kingdom: Plantae
- Clade: Tracheophytes
- Clade: Angiosperms
- Clade: Eudicots
- Clade: Rosids
- Order: Sapindales
- Family: Burseraceae
- Genus: Commiphora
- Species: C. madagascariensis

Binomial name
- Commiphora madagascariensis Jacq. (1797)

= Commiphora madagascariensis =

Species of flowering plant

Commiphora madagascariensis, with the common name Madagascar corkwood, is a flowering plant in the family Burseraceae. The species is native to Tanzania, introduced into India.

== Description ==
This slender sometimes scandent shrub or tree (1–15 m) is found in thickets and semi-evergreen dry forest at elevations of 0–660 m.

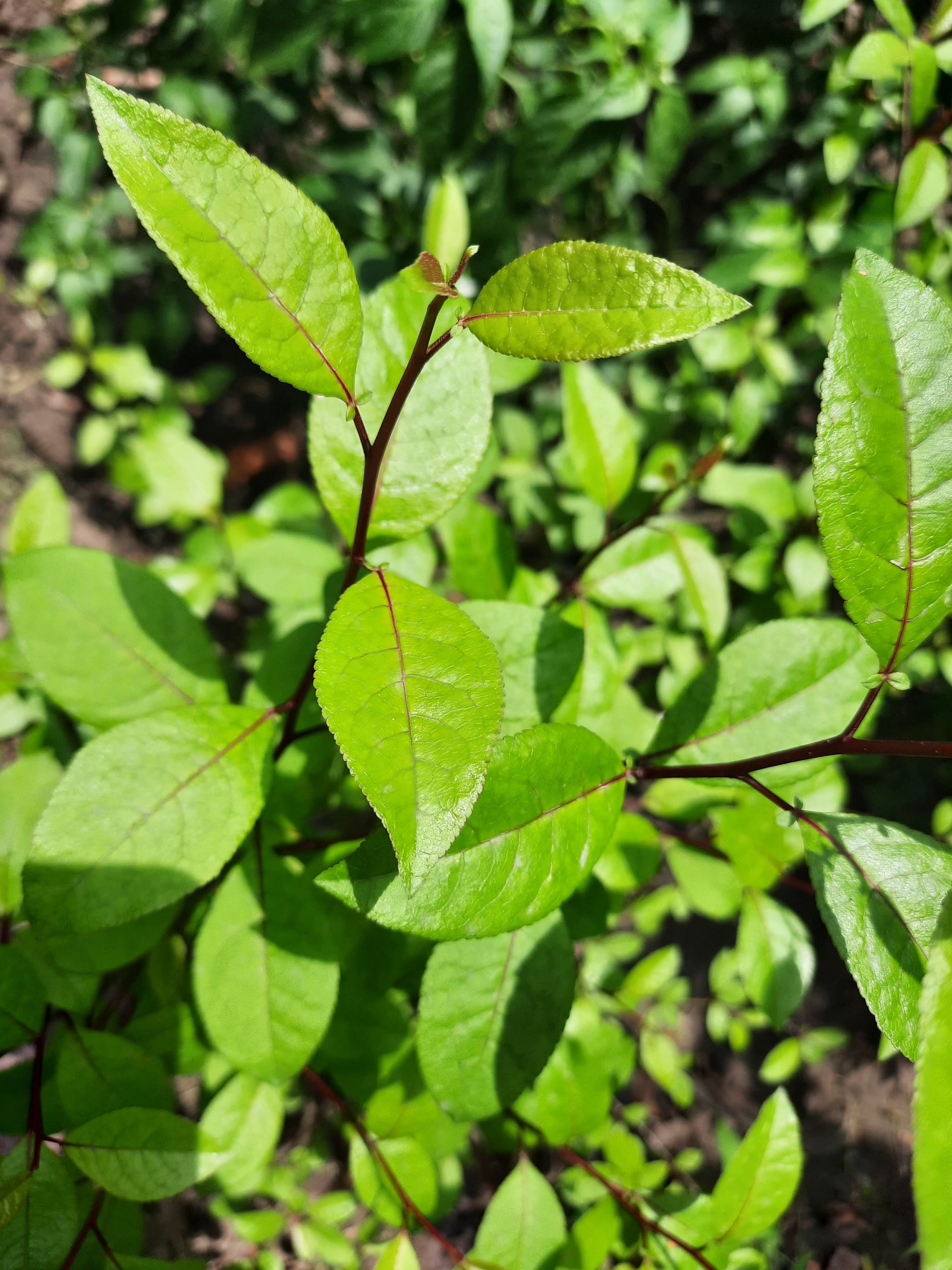
Close-up of leaves

The bark smooth, dark brown, grey-brown or green-brown; branches often spiny, hairless. Leaves are 1-foliolate or 3-foliolate with 2 much smaller lateral leaflets; leaf-stalk very short, about 1 mm long, or considerably longer, up to 1–5 cm; leaflet-blade up to 4 x 1–5 cm, elliptic or narrowly ovate-spoon-shaped, tip pointed or blunt, margins finely rounded saw-toothed, base wedge-shaped, hairless on both sides. Flowers appear before the leaves or with the young leaves in nearly stalkless clusters on short side-shoots or spines. Sepal-cup is about 2 mm long, tubular, lobed to 1/3 to 1/2-way, and hairless. Petals are about 4 mm long. Disk-lobes are 4. Stamen-filaments slender, nearly round. Fruit is about 1-2 x 0–6 cm, ellipsoid, somewhat flattened, hairless, tip somewhat apiculate.

== Endangerment and rescue ==
World Conservation Union (IUCN) has enlisted it in its IUCN Red List of threatened species. The species is known from 11 locations, some of which have threats such as urbanisation (Mjimwema), increasing human population (Mnazi Bay) or planned hydropower schemes (Stiegler's Gorge). We assess this species as Near Threatened, as it is close to meeting the thresholds for listing in a threatened category.
