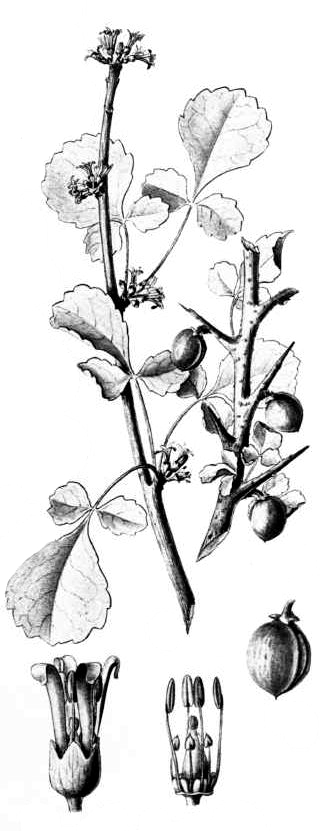
- Commiphora africana

Scientific classification
- Kingdom: Plantae
- Clade: Tracheophytes
- Clade: Angiosperms
- Clade: Eudicots
- Clade: Rosids
- Order: Sapindales
- Family: Burseraceae
- Genus: Commiphora
- Species: C. africana

Binomial name
- Commiphora africana (A.Rich.) Endl.

Synonyms
- List: Balsamea africana Baill.; Balsamea kotschyi Engl.; Balsamea pilosa Engl.; Balsamodendrum africanum Arn.; Commiphora benadirensis Mattei; Commiphora cakiicola Engl.; Commiphora calciicola Engl.; Commiphora loandensis Engl.; Commiphora nkolola Engl.; Commiphora pilosa (Engl.) Engl.; Commiphora rugosa Engl.; Commiphora sambesiaca Engl.; Heudelotia africana A.Rich.

= Commiphora africana =

Species of tree

Commiphora africana, commonly called African myrrh, is a small deciduous tree belonging to the Burseraceae, a family akin to the Anacardiaceae, occurring widely over sub-Saharan Africa in Angola, Botswana, Burkina Faso, Chad, Eswatini, Eritrea, Ethiopia, Kenya, Mali, Mauritania, Mozambique, Namibia, Niger, Senegal, Somalia, South Africa, Sudan, Tanzania, Uganda, Zambia and Zimbabwe. On sandy soils this species sometimes forms pure stands, deserving consideration as a plant community or association.

Closely related to C. glandulosa, C. africana is usually some 5m tall, its branchlets often ending in spines. Its bark is grey-green, peeling to reveal a shiny surface, red when damaged, and then exuding bdellion, a clear, edible, aromatic gum ('Commiphora'='gum-bearing'). The leaves are trifoliate with a large terminal leaflet and two small side leaflets, bluntly toothed, and, as with most Commiphoras, pleasantly aromatic when crushed. Fruits are reddish, and about 6–8 mm across, splitting when ripe to reveal a hard, black seed held by a pseudo-aril or mericarp with four red fingers, resembling the clasps holding a jewel in a brooch or ring setting. The tree's fruits are edible while the succulent, sweet roots are often chewed by humans, and the new leaves are sought after by camels and goats, particularly at the beginning of the dry season.

This tree is extremely sensitive to atmospheric humidity and will expand its leaf buds at the first hint of moisture-laden winds. Consequently it is the first tree to come into leaf with the arrival of the wet season, and remains remarkably green throughout the rainy period. In the Sahel this striking fresh appearance is shared only by Salvadora persica. The leaves, though, survive only as long as the moist air lasts, and dry out as soon as the rainy season is over, at which time the colour of the foliage changes to a remarkable, golden hue. C. africana takes advantage of any wet spells to complete a leafing, flowering and fruiting cycle, and retreats into dormancy over unfavourable periods. Even so its foliage displays none of the features usually associated with drought-adapted plants. Herdsmen of the northern Sahel follow the rainfall patterns and the C. africana trees as they come into leaf, continually finding new areas for their animals to browse.

This species is the preferred food plant of the beetle Diamphidia, the larva of which is used as a potent arrow poison. C. africana is particularly suitable as a live fence.

Tree parts are used to treat a wide range of ailments - fruits for typhoid fever and stomach problems, bark for malaria, resin for convulsions and for covering and disinfecting wounds, and burnt resin as an insecticide and aphrodisiac. The soft, termite-resistant wood is used for carving domestic utensils, music instruments and general purpose items. An edible oil is also extracted and parts of the tree exhibit strong fungicidal properties.
