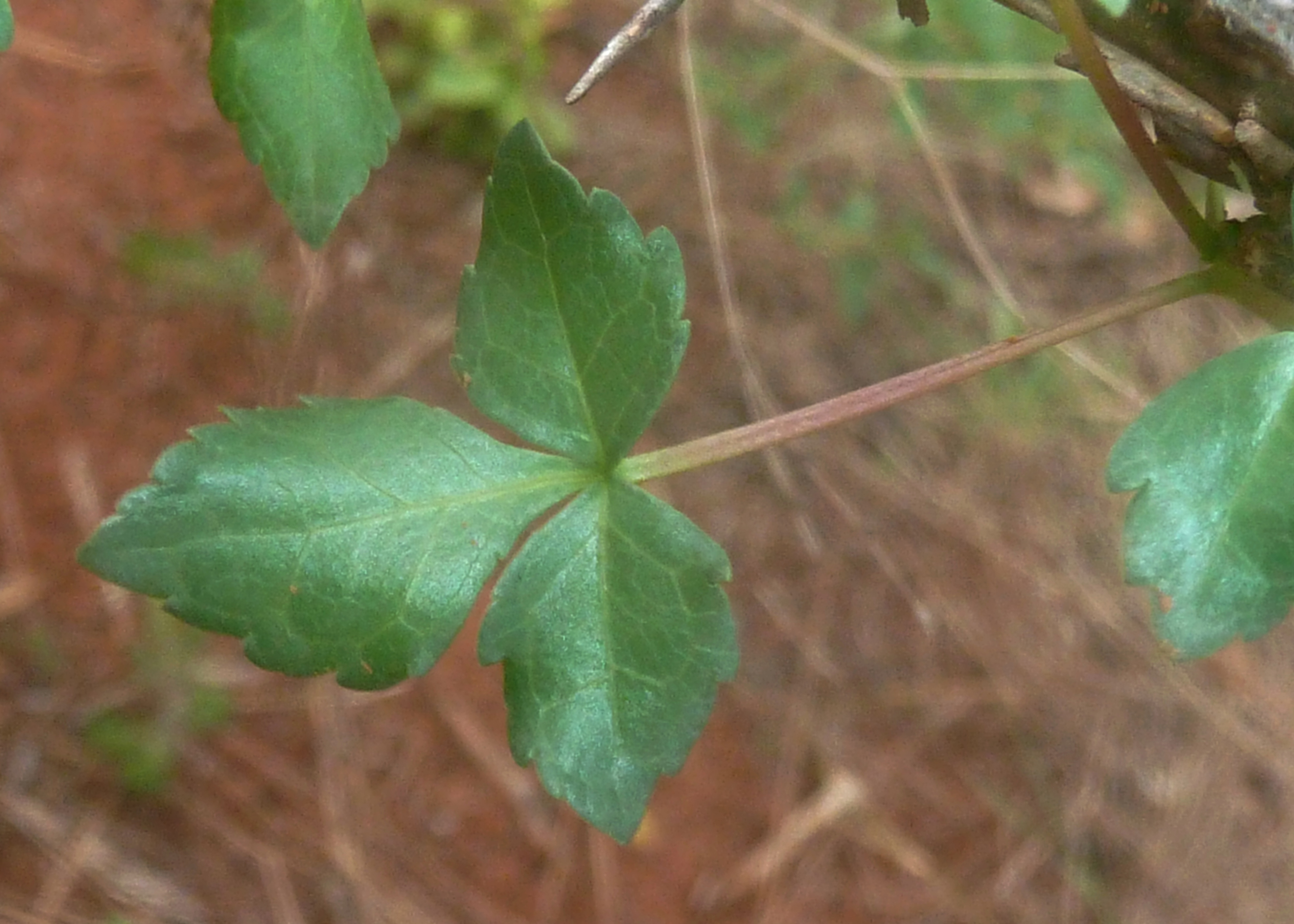

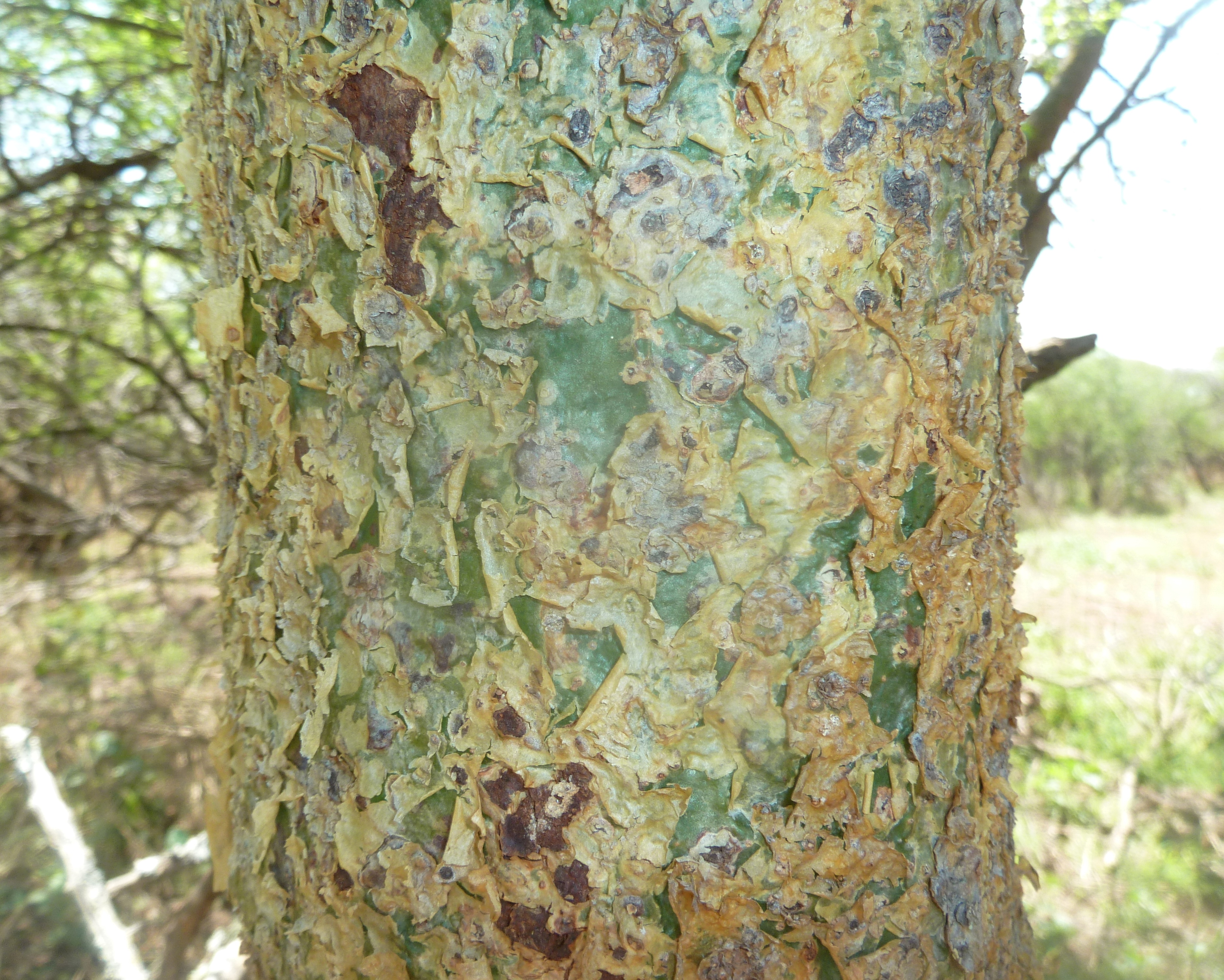
- Leaf and bark of C. schimperi

Scientific classification
- Kingdom: Plantae
- Clade: Tracheophytes
- Clade: Angiosperms
- Clade: Eudicots
- Clade: Rosids
- Order: Sapindales
- Family: Burseraceae
- Genus: Commiphora
- Species: C. schimperi

Binomial name
- Commiphora schimperi (O.Berg) Engl. (1883)

Synonyms
- Balsamea schimperi (O.Berg) Engl. (1880); Balsamodendron schimperi O.Berg (1862); Commiphora arussensis Engl. (1904); Commiphora betschuanica Engl. (1910); Commiphora buraensis Engl. (1904); Commiphora flabellulifera Chiov. (1916); Commiphora neumannii Engl. (1904); Commiphora resiniflua Martelli (1886); Commiphora trothae Engl. (1899)

= Commiphora schimperi =

Glossy-leaved corkwood

Species of flowering plant

Commiphora schimperi, also known as glossy-leaved corkwood, is a tree species in the genus Commiphora. It is native eastern and southern Africa and the southern Arabian Peninsula, from Sudan and Yemen in the north to Botswana and northern South Africa (KwaZulu-Natal and Northern Provinces) in the south.
