= Bdellium =

Semi-transparent tree resin

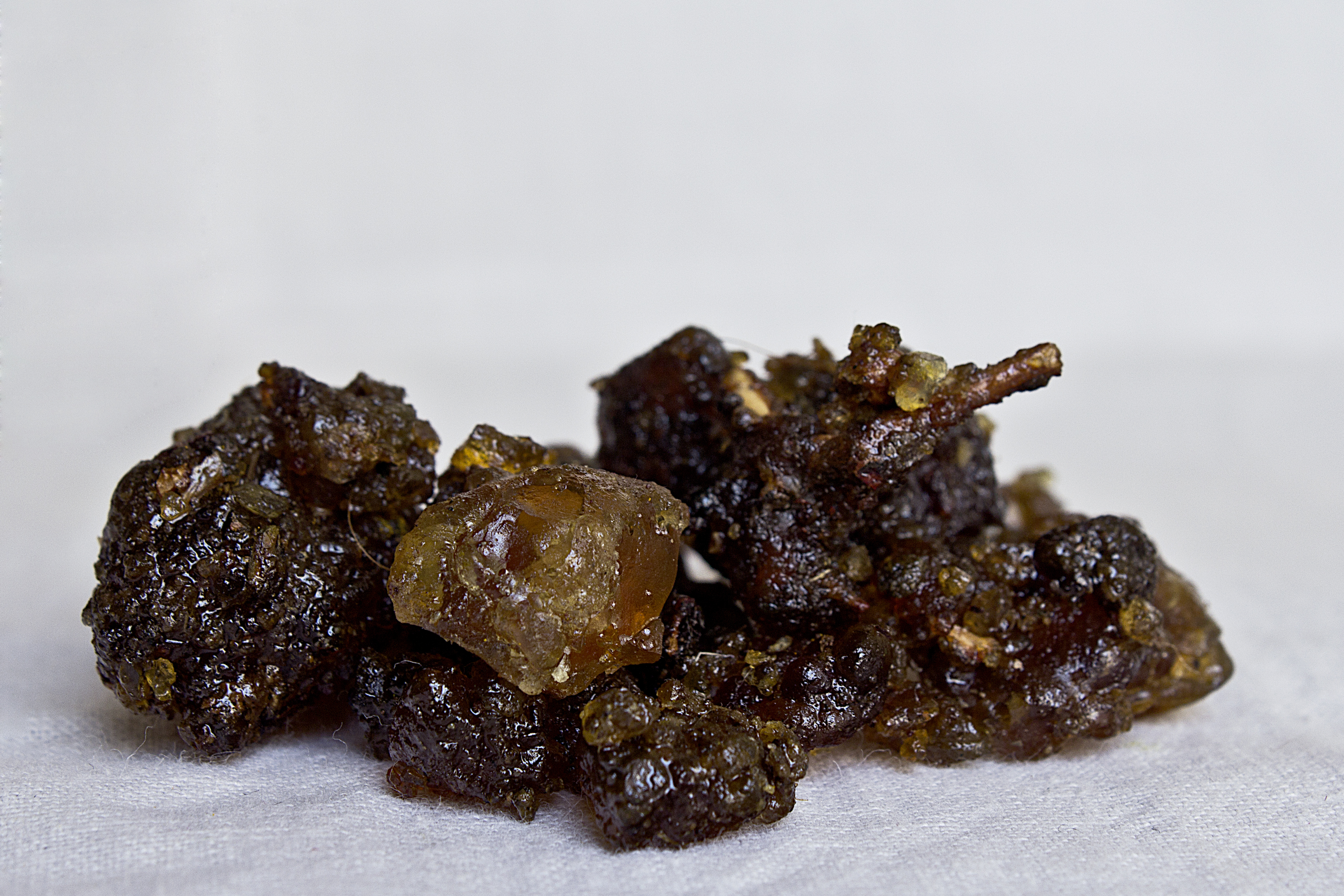
Bdellium resin

Bdellium /ˈdɛliəm/ (also bdellion or false myrrh) is a semi-transparent oleo-gum resin extracted from Commiphora wightii plants, and from Commiphora africana trees growing in sub-Saharan Africa. According to Pliny the best quality came from Bactria. Other named sources for the resin are Arabia, India, Media, and Babylonia.

== Composition ==
Bdellium consists of a water-soluble gum, a resin, and an essential oil. The essential oil of Commiphora africana contains predominantly α-thujene, α- and β-pinene, and p-cymene.

== Uses ==
Bdellium is used in perfumery, as incense, and in traditional medicine. It is an adulterant of the more costly myrrh.

== Name ==
Middle English, learnedly borrowed from Latin bdellium, itself borrowed from Ancient Greek βδέλλιον, of unknown origin, possibly from Semitic or a Pre-Greek substrate. Compare Hebrew בְּדֹלַח (bdólakh).

Commiphora africana resin is also known as African bdellium.

== Origin ==
Theophrastus is perhaps the first European classical author to mention bdellium, if the report that came back from his informant in Alexander's expedition refers to Commiphora wightii: "In the region called Aria there is a thorn tree which produces a tear of resin, resembling myrrh in appearance and odour. It liquefies when the sun shines upon it."

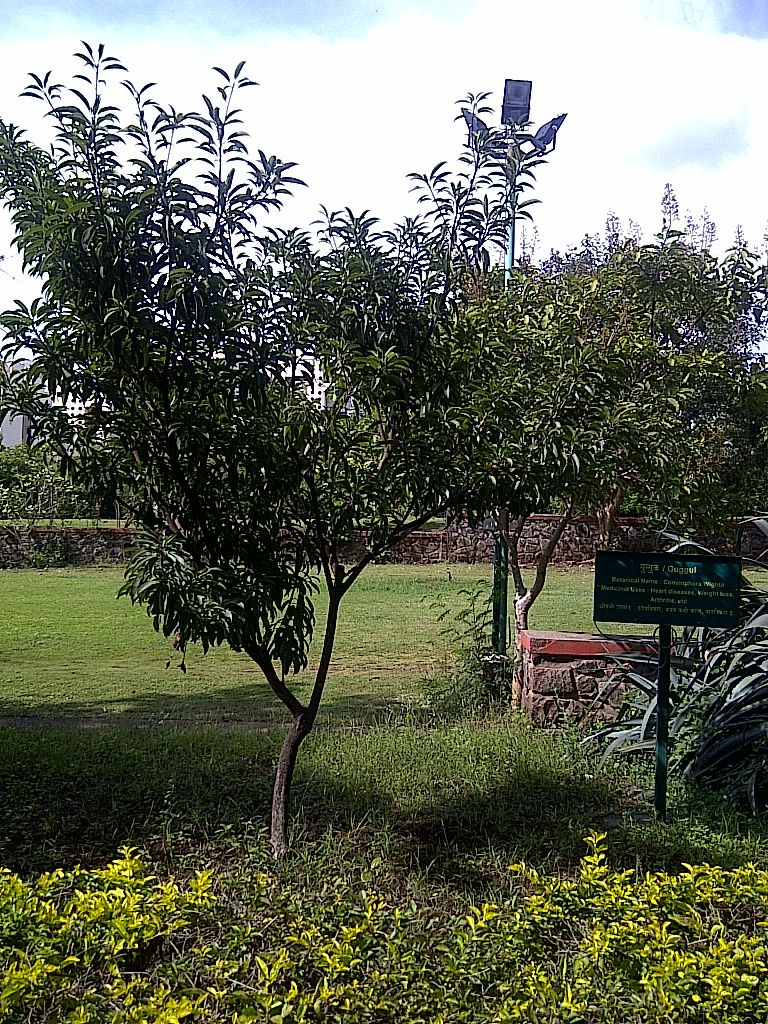
Commiphora wightii

Plautus in his play Curculio refers to it. Pliny the Elder, in his Natural History (12:36), describes the best bdellium coming from Bactria (identified as Commiphora wightii (Note: The identification was to Commiphora roxburghii, a taxonomic synonym of C. wightii.)) as a "tree black in colour, and the size of the olive tree; its leaf resembles that of the oak and its fruit the wild fig", as well as bdellium coming from Nubia (identified as Commiphora africana). However, his descriptions (Note: "Next to Ariane is Bactriane, which produces the most esteemed kind of bdellium. The tree is of a black colour and of the size of an olive-tree. Its leaf resembles that of the oak, and its fruit that of the wild fig-tree. Bdellium itself is of the nature of a gum. Some call it brochon, others malacha, others again maldacon, but when it is black and rolled into a little ball it is known as hadrabolon. This substance ought to be transparent like wax, odoriferous, unctuous when crumbled, and bitter to the taste but without being at all acid. When used in sacred rites it is steeped in wine to increase its fragrance. It grows in Arabia and India as well as in Media and Babylon. Some persons call the bdellium which is brought to us by way of Media, peratic. It is more brittle than the other kinds, harder in the crust, and more bitter to the taste; the Indian kind is, on the other hand, moister and gummy, and is adulterated by means of the almond nut. The various other kinds are corrupted with the bark of scordastum, the tree of this name producing a gum which resembles bdellium. The adulterations of perfumes, let it be said once for all, are detected by their smell, by their colour, weight, taste, and by the action of fire. The Bactrian bdellium is dry and shining, and has numerous white spots, like finger-nails in shape. Besides, it should be of a certain weight than which it ought to be neither heavier nor lighter. The price of bdellium when quite pure is three denarii per pound." (Pliny the Elder, Natural History 12.19).) seem to cover a range of strongly perfumed resins. The Periplus of the Erythraean Sea, of the 2nd century CE, reports that bdella are exported from the port of Barbarice at the mouth of the Indus. The Bactrian variety is known among Arabs as mokul.

The bdellium referred to by Dioscorides as "the bdellium imported from Petra" (De Materia Medica, 1:80) is probably the resin of Hyphaene thebaica, a species of palm. The Arabs call it "Jewish bdellium".

In China, bdellium, known as ānxī xiāng (Chinese: 安息香) or "Arsacid aromatic", was among the varieties of incense that reached China either along the Silk Route from Central Asia, or by sea. Later ānxī xiāng was applied to an East Indian substitute, gum benzoin from Sumatra.

Bdellium was an ingredient in the prescriptions of ancient physicians from Galen to Paul of Aegina, and in the Greater Kuphi.

Isidore of Seville reports in his Etymologiae (XVII.viii.6) that bdellium comes from trees in India and Arabia, the Arabian variety being better as it is smooth, whitish and smells good; the Indian variety is a dirty black and very delicious.

=== In the Bible ===
"Bdellium" is the common English translation in the Bible for the Hebrew bedolach (בְּדֹלַח), which appears in Genesis 2:12 and Numbers 11:7. In Genesis, it is given as a product of Havilah, where it is listed along with other precious items gold and onyx. In Numbers, the reference to bdellium is in the context of the manna eaten by the Israelites in the wilderness, which is said to have "the color of bdellium". These are the only two uses in the Hebrew scripture, and there is no agreement about whether the term bedolach actually referred to the resin. The Septuagint translates the word with ἄνθραξ (anthrax) in Genesis and with κρύσταλλος (crystal) in Numbers, thus interpreting it as the name of a precious stone, and Rashi describes it as "a precious stone, crystal".
