= Opopanax (perfumery) =

Oleo-gum-resin of Commiphora guidottii

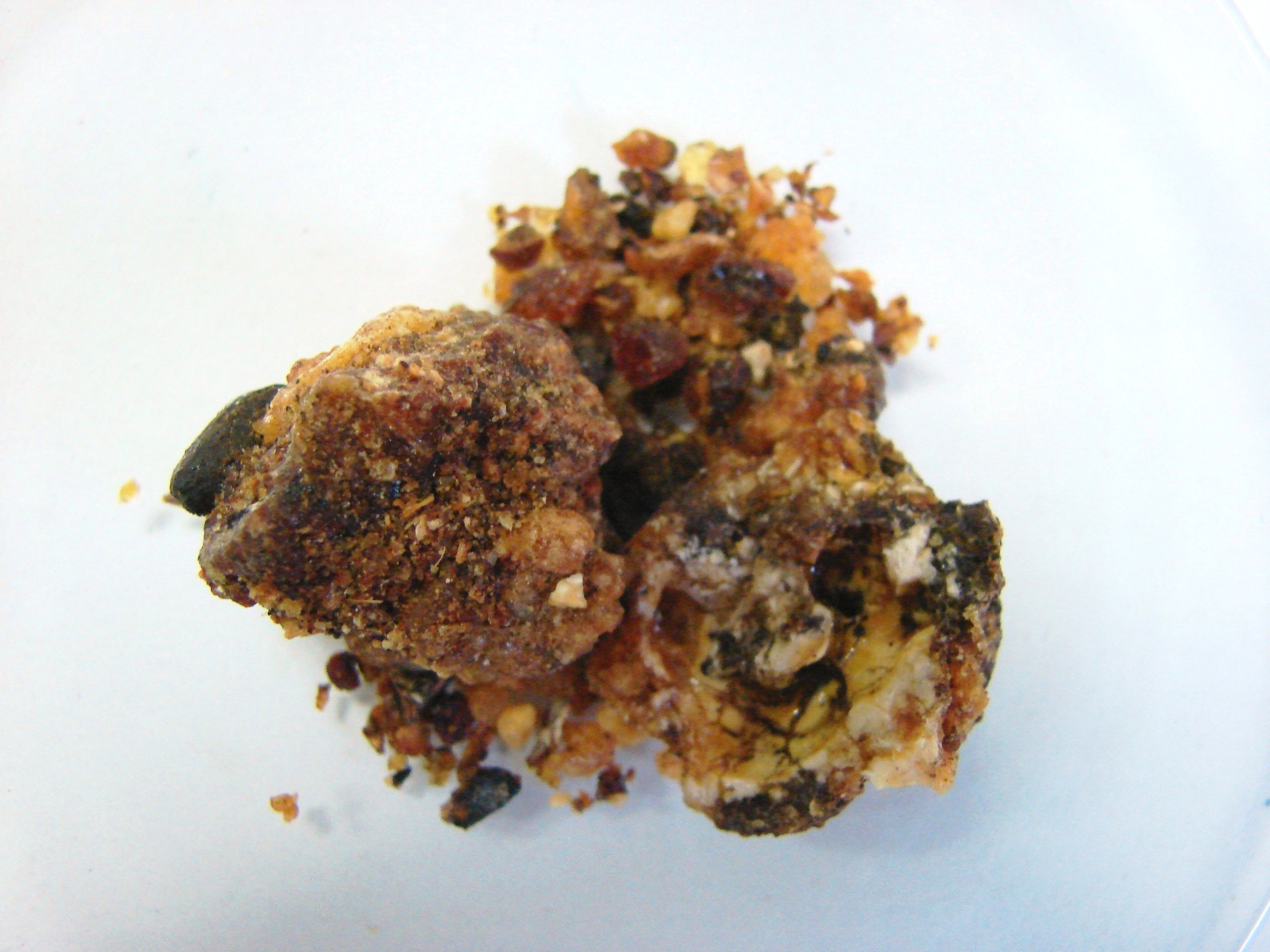
Bisabol, the oleo-gum-resin of Commiphora guidottii

Opopanax is the commercial name of bisabol or bissabol, the fragrant oleo-gum-resin of Commiphora guidottii. It has been a major export article from Somalia since ancient times, and is called hebbakhade, habaghadi or habak hadi (habbak haddi) in Somali. It is an important ingredient in perfumery and therefore known as scented myrrh, sweet myrrh, perfumed myrrh or perfumed bdellium.

Sometimes the oleo-gum-resin of Commiphora holtziana (often treated as a synonym of C. erythraea or C. kataf), called habak hagar, habaq hagar ad or habbak harr in Somali, is also sold under the name of opopanax.

== Etymology ==
"Opopanax" originally refers to the gum resin from plants of the genus Opoponax which is used in herbal medicine rather than perfumery. In the early 20th century, the name "opopanax" was misapplied to bisabol in perfumery. Nowadays the true opopanax is seldom used and the commercial opopanax is almost exclusively bisabol. To distinguish bisabol from the true opoponax, it is often alternatively spelled opoponax, and sometimes referred to as the opopanax of perfumery or perfumery's opopanax. For example, opopanax of perfumery is used in many iconic perfumes, such as Guerlain Shalimar (1921), Chanel Coco Mademoiselle (2001), Dior Poison (1985), and many others.

== Botanical origin ==
The true botanical origin of perfumery's opopanax is a tree native to Somalia and Ethiopia, Commiphora guidottii Chiov. ex Guid., known as hadi in Somali.

It has been mistakenly believed that the opopanax of perfumery comes from Commiphora erythraea (Ehrenb.) Engl. or Commiphora kataf subsp. erythraea (Ehrenb.) J.B.Gillett, owing to historical misidentification. C. erythraea sensu stricto is narrowly distributed in the coastal region of the Red Sea, but C. erythraea sensu lato incorporates Commiphora holtziana Engl. which is widely distributed in East Africa, known as hagar ad or hagar in Somali. The oleo-gum-resin of hagar ad is sometimes sold under the name of opopanax or perfumed bdellium. This is not only because of historical misidentification, but also attributable to their similar scents. The oleo-gum-resin of hagar ad (C. holtziana or C. erythraea) is considered the second strongest-scented bdellium after that of hadi (C. guidottii).

== Uses ==
A resinoid is prepared from the oleo-gum-resin by solvent extraction.

== See also ==
- L'Opoponax, a 1964 novel by Monique Wittig
- Opopanax (genus)
- Myrrh
- Bdellium
