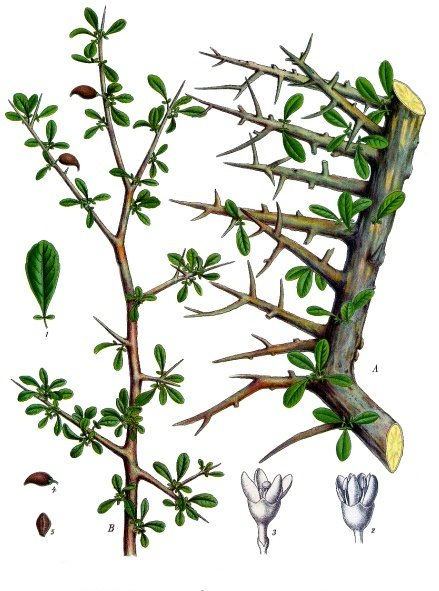

Scientific classification
- Kingdom: Plantae
- Clade: Embryophytes
- Clade: Tracheophytes
- Clade: Spermatophytes
- Clade: Angiosperms
- Clade: Eudicots
- Clade: Rosids
- Order: Sapindales
- Family: Burseraceae
- Genus: Commiphora
- Species: C. myrrha

Binomial name
- Commiphora myrrha (Nees) Engl.

Synonyms
- List: Balsamea myrrha (T.Nees) Oken; Balsamea myrrha Baill.; Balsamea playfairii Engl.; Balsamodendrum myrrha T.Nees; Commiphora coriacea Engl.; Commiphora cuspidata Chiov.; Commiphora molmol (Engl.) Engl. ex Tschirch; Commiphora rivae Engl.

= Commiphora myrrha =

Species of tree

Commiphora myrrha, called myrrh, Somali myrrh, herabol myrrh, common myrrh, is a tree in the family Burseraceae. It is one of the primary trees used in the production of myrrh, a resin made from dried tree sap. The Commiphora myrrha tree is indigenous to Somalia, in the Somali regions of Ethiopia and Kenya, Djibouti, Eritrea and parts of the Arabian Peninsula (Yemen and Oman).

Myrrh is a fragrant gum resin that is similar to frankincense. The tree species that produces myrrh (Commiphora myrrha) thrives well in the arid and semi-arid regions. Somalia is the largest producer of both myrrh and frankincense.

Myrrh has been used historically for over 3,000 years. Evidence of its use may be found as far back as the early days of ancient Egypt. It was employed there for embalming in a manner akin to that of frankincense. However, the raw material has also been used as incense for a very long time. Myrrh was and is still used for ceremonial incense and anointing in a number of nations, including Somalia, Ethiopia, Sudan, and Yemen.

== Description ==
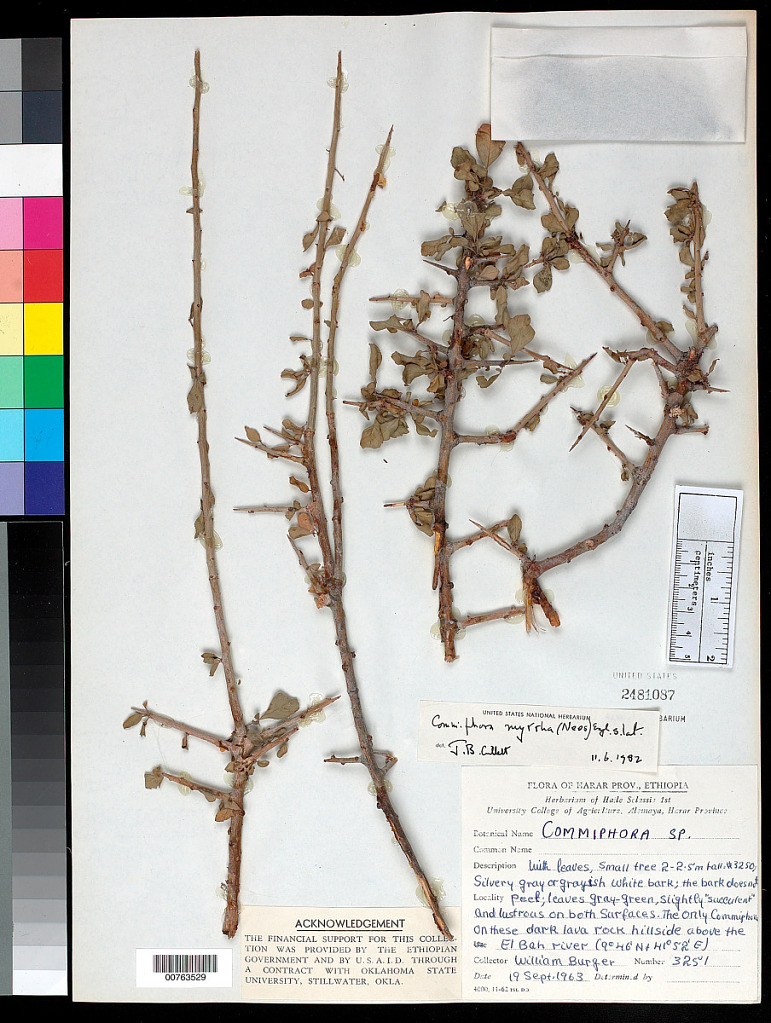
Spiny branches of C. myrrha

Commiphora myrrha is very spiny and it grows to a height of about 5 m (16 ft). Its short, hairless, thick, and flaky trunk has two layers of bark. The upper layer is silvery, whitish, reddish, or bluish-grey and has a papery-texture. Underneath it, the bark is green and performs photosynthesis.

Due to this species' high variability, Commiphora myrrha can be difficult to distinguish from other species within the Commiphora genus. The leaves of Commiphora myrrha are a greyish-green colour with a papery texture. The plant's leaves may come in an oblong or oval shape and are between 6-44mm long, and 3-20mm wide. Each leaf alternates and consists of three leaflets in a pinnately compound arrangement.

The plant's yellow-red flowers are dioecious and are arranged in a panicle inflorescence. The flowers of the common myrrh are very tiny and are oval shaped. The male flowers are only 3-4mm long and flower early. Its smooth, brown fruit is about the same size as the flowers, and is shaped like an egg.

=== Resin ===
From the stem of Commiphora myrrha, its oleoresin oozes from incisions in the bark and dries into small clumps of sap. The resin's fragrance and its medicinal properties come from the various classes of terpenoids it contains. Additionally, the common myrrh tastes sour, bitter, and aromatic.

=== Distribution and habitat ===
Native to eastern and northeastern Africa and the Arabian peninsula, this plant grows on slopes and valleys in desert regions with open Vachellia. It grows at an elevation of approximately 250 to 1,300 m (820 to 4,270 ft) with a yearly mean rainfall of about 23 to 30 cm (9.1 to 11.8 in). It does best in thin soil, primarily in areas with limestone.

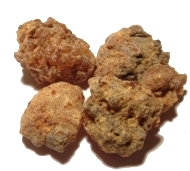
Myrrh, the hardened resin extracted from Commiphora myrrha

=== History ===
Myrrh extracted from Commiphora myrrha was a precious commodity in the ancient world, as it was used to create perfumes and incense. Myrrh was traditionally used in the ancient world as an insect repellent, incense for religious rituals and in embalming the dead. Physicians also took advantage of its medicinal properties, treating it for several ailments, including wounds, diseases such as leprosy and syphilis, and to help with digestion and menstruation.

== Medicinal properties ==
It is anti-bacterial, anti-fungal, anti-pest and can be used for fumigation or oral use. It has been used as an astringent, antiseptic, anti-parasitic, anti-viral anti-tussive, emmenagogue, and anti-spasmodic agent. It was commonly included in mixtures used to treat worms, wounds, and sepsis. It is also a potent treatment for gingivitis, canker sores, sore throat, boils, arthritis, and acne. Due to its medicinal properties, it is imagined as a potential preventative and therapeutic agent for several diseases, including COVID-19.

== Modern uses ==
Resin from Commiphora myrrha continues to be an important source of myrrh, which is a key ingredient that adds flavour to meat products, desserts, soft drinks, gum, and sweets. Moreover, its use as a fragrance in incense has extended to other cosmetic products, such as mouthwash, soaps, and perfumes.
