= Arebsun inscriptions =

Group of Aramaic inscriptions

The stone slab (inscription not shown)

Smirnov's original publication

The Arebsun inscriptions are twelve Aramaic inscriptions on steles from Gülşehir (Arebsun), also known as Yarpouz, in Cappadocia, central Anatolia, dating to the late Achaemenid or early Parthian period. They are now held in the Istanbul Archaeology Museums.

== Discovery ==
The stelae were found at Yarpouz, generally identified with the ancient city of Arebsun, today Gülşehir, near Nevşehir and Caesarea in Cappadocia. The Russian traveller Y. I. Smirnov saw several of the reliefs still in place at Yarpouz in 1895 and published an early account in the journal of the Imperial Russian Archaeological Society .

A study was published by Charles Clermont-Ganneau in 1898, using photographs and squeezes sent from Constantinople by P. Scheil. Clermont-Ganneau identified the script and language as Aramaic, while noting the difficulty of reading the worn, irregular surfaces and the imperfect copies then available.

Further editions and discussions followed from Joseph Halévy, Mark Lidzbarski, Josef Marquart, and André Lemaire. The inscriptions were later assigned the number KAI 264 in the standard corpus Kanaanäische und Aramäische Inschriften.

== Inscriptions ==
The inscriptions are written in Imperial Aramaic. They accompany reliefs on two large stones, designated A and B, and are associated with depictions of animals, a chariot, and other figured scenes.

The best-known text, Arebsun B1 or KAI 264 / RES 1785, is carved beneath a relief of a duck. It commemorates the marriage of Bel with his sister and invokes Ahura Mazda and Daena.

== Bibliography ==
- Smirnova, Y. I. (1895). "Б. А. Тураевъ доложилъ адресованное Отдѣленію слѣдующее сообщеніе чл.-сотр. Я. И. Смирнова". Записки Императорского Русского Археологического общества Новая серия Том 8 Труды Отделения архео. 8: 444–446.
- Halévy, Joseph. "Inscription araméenne de Cappadoce". Revue Semitique: 271ff.
- Clermont-Ganneau, Charles (1898). "Inscription araméenne de Cappadoce". Comptes rendus des séances de l’Académie des Inscriptions et Belles-Lettres. 42 (5): 630–640, 808–810. doi:10.3406/crai.1898.71267.
- Clermont-Ganneau, Charles (1900). Inscription araméenne de Cappadoce. Recueil d’archéologie orientale. Vol. III. Paris. pp. 59–70.
- Lidzbarski, Mark (1900–1902). "Aramäische Inschriften aus Kappadocien". Ephemeris für semitische Epigraphik. I. Giessen: 59–74, 319–326.
- Marquart, Josef (1905). Untersuchungen zur Geschichte von Eran.
- Lemaire, André (2000). Textes araméens d'Anatolie d'époque perse.
- Lemaire, André. "Les pierres et inscriptions araméennes d'Arebsun (Cappadoce). Nouvel examen". In Shaked, Shaul; Netzer, Amnon (eds.). Irano-Judaica IV. Jerusalem.
