= Ancient Qumran: A Virtual Reality Tour =

- Ancient Qumran: A Virtual Reality Tour
- Directed by: Robert Cargill
- Written by: Robert Cargill
- Produced by: Qumran Visualization Project (QVP) at UCLA, William Schniedewind
- Release date: 2007
- Country: United States

Ancient Qumran: A Virtual Reality Tour is the title of a computer-generated film that presents a theoretical reconstruction of the ancient Khirbet Qumran site in the West Bank. The film is silent, but is projected together with an oral presentation interpreting the Qumran site's historical significance. The film and presentation were authored by Robert Cargill, while a graduate student at UCLA and an associate of the Qumran Visualization Project (QVP) that was directed by UCLA bible scholar William Schniedewind. QVP presents itself as "a tool to better illustrate the daily life of the community described within the [Dead Sea] scrolls." The UCLA International Institute cites Cargill and Schniedewind as saying that their new virtual model resolves long-simmering controversies surrounding the important Dead Sea Scrolls site.

== Summary ==
According to a UCLA press release of June 18, 2007, "while building the world's first three-dimensional computer model" of Qumran, Cargill and Schniedewind concluded that "Qumran was established originally as a fortress, just as the archaeological evidence shows, and ... was later resettled by the Essenes, an early Jewish religious community that came from Jerusalem, bringing with them the scrolls and continuing to copy and compose new scrolls."

Referring to theories that Qumran was a fortress, the home of the Essenes, or a wealthy Jerusalem family's estate, the release states that "Cargill and Schniedewind cut the three competing theories down the middle, contending that none of them hold together without elements from the others," and further quotes Schniedewind as saying: "Once you put all the archaeological evidence into three dimensions, the solution literally jumps out at you."

== Production ==
The computer model from which the film was produced, was built over the course of 15 months using MultiGen Creator, a 3D modeling tool for generating walk-throughs; photos from the site were used to generate textures that were applied to artifacts, wood, pottery and other artifacts. Autodesk Maya was used to add realism to the film.

According to the UCLA Qumran Visualization project website, modeling in a virtual environment allowed the archaeologists to test new ideas and re-constructions. The website asserts that the virtual environment reveals some re-constructions to be architecturally impossible, with the result that the virtual model excludes certain interpretations.

== Exhibition ==
The San Diego Natural History Museum describes the film as "a fully reconstructed, real-time, interactive model of the site at Khirbet Qumran. Ancient Qumran, setting the standard for Qumran archaeology, allows the ancient site to literally emerge from its remains. Every room at Khirbet Qumran is reconstructed and furnished with artifacts. The result is a journey back in time and a glimpse into a world that influenced the birth of modern Judaism and Christianity."

Steven Spielberg’s Righteous Persons Foundation, provided US$100,000 funding to bring the Dead Sea Scrolls to San Diego, including specific funding for the virtual presentation. Additional funding came from the San Diego Natural History Museum, who underwrote the production of the film.

== Reception ==
=== News coverage ===
A Fox News article of July 13, 2007, states that "Using the world's first virtual 3-D reconstruction of the site, historians [Schniedewind and Cargill] recently found evidence of a fortress that was later converted into its more peaceful, pious function." The article quotes Schniedewind as saying that the virtual reconstruction allowed him and Cargill "to 'see' architectural elements invisible to the naked eye."

An article in the Science Daily, asserts that "Like many scholars before them, Cargill and Schniedewind believe the Essenes, who practiced communal ownership, brought all of their possessions to the site, including about 70 percent of the scrolls discovered in the area."
