= Ernest-Marie Laperrousaz =

French historian and archaeologist

Ernest-Marie Laperrousaz (2 August 1924 – 20 August 2013) was a French historian and archaeologist. As an archaeologist he worked at Qumran and Masada. He has published numerous books including works on Qumran and the context of the Dead Sea Scrolls.

Laperrousaz is now professeur honoraire of the religious studies faculty of the École pratique des hautes études and was formerly the director of that institution. He was a resident at the École biblique et archéologique française de Jérusalem. He has long been acquainted with Qumran, having been a participant in the excavations directed by Roland de Vaux from 1953 to 1956. From 1970 to 1995 Laperrousaz continued an archaeological mission to Jerusalem and the Qumran area on a yearly basis. Always a strong believer in the Qumran-Essene hypothesis, he differed with de Vaux over interpretations of the site of Qumran. His most influential work is Qoumran: L'Etablissement essénien des bord de la Mer Morte: Histoire et archéologie du site, an independent study of the archaeology of Qumran.

== Selected publications ==
Laperrousaz has been a prolific writer on archaeological subjects in French. Among his books are:

- Les Manuscrits de la mer Morte, Que sais-je?, 1961; 1984; 10e éd. mise à jour, 2003
- Qoumrân : L'établissement essénien des bords de la mer Morte, Histoire et archéologie du site, Picard, 1976
- Les Esséniens selon leur témoignage direct, Desclée, 1982
- Attente du Messie en Palestine à la veille et au début de l'ère chrétienne, Picard, 1982
- La Protohistoire d'Israël, de l'exode à la monarchie (dir.), Cerf, 1990
- La Palestine à l'époque perse (with André Lemaire), Cerf, 1994
- Salomon, roi d'Israël, Hachette Éducation, 2000
- Les Temples de Jérusalem, Paris-Méditerranée, 2000
- Trois Hauts Lieux de Judée : L'Hérodium, Massada et Qoumrân, Paris-Méditerranée, 2001
- Jésus : Les questions primordiales, Edimaf, 2002
- Problèmes d'histoire des religions : Mises au point, Paris-Méditerranée; 2006
- Qoumrân et ses manuscrits de la mer Morte, Non Lieu, 2006

== Bibliography ==
- Qoumran: L'Etablissement essenien by F.F. Bruce, Journal of Semitic Studies 24:1 (1979) 119–120
- Ernest-Marie Laperrousaz's obituary
