= William Schniedewind =

American academic (born 1962)

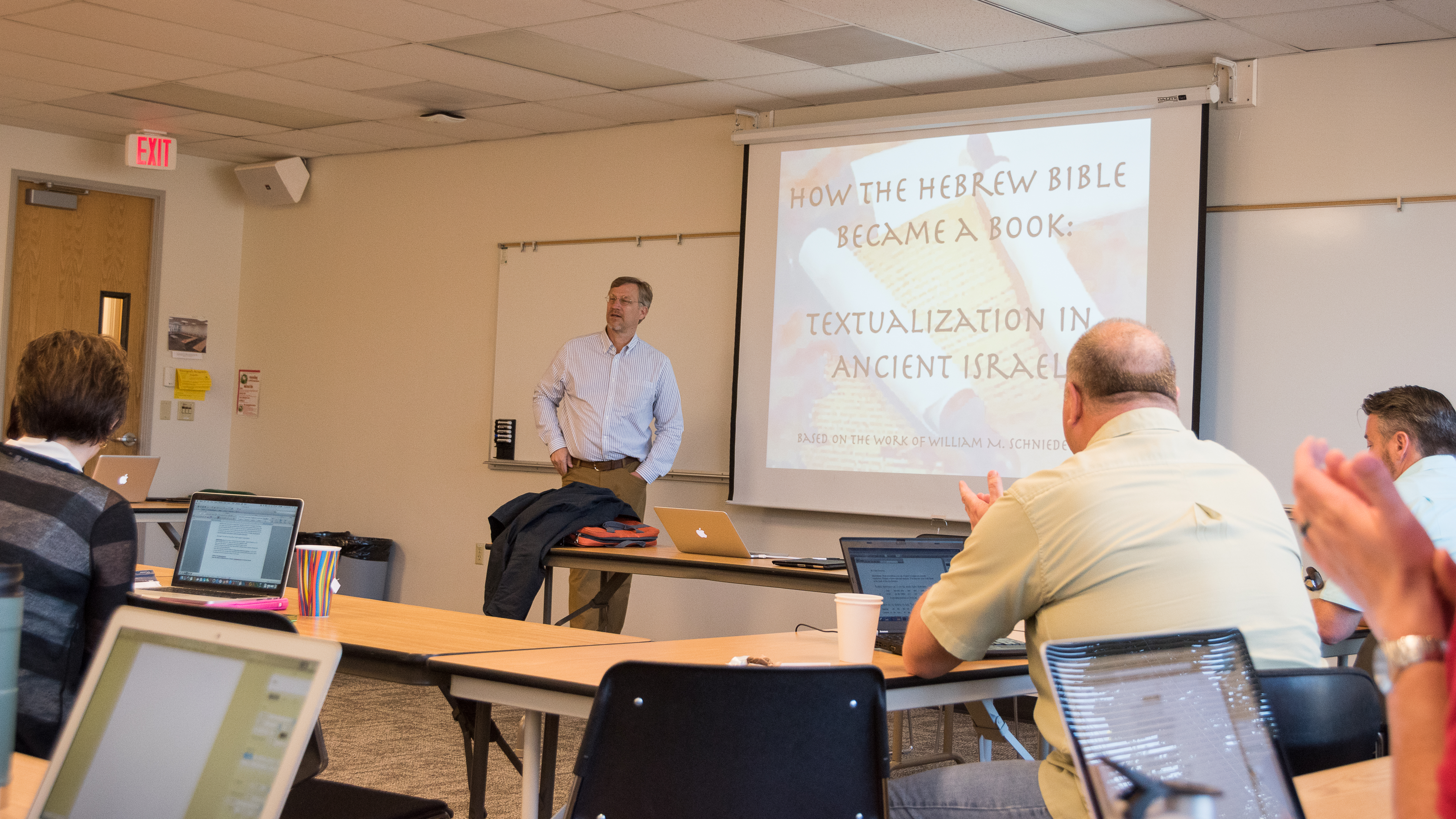

Academic background
- Education: Brandeis University
- Thesis: Prophets, Prophecy, and Inspiration: A Study of Prophecy in the Book of Chronicles (1992)

Academic work
- Discipline: Biblical studies
- Institutions: University of California, Los Angeles

William M. Schniedewind (born 1962, New York City) holds the Kershaw Chair of Ancient Eastern Mediterranean Studies and is a Professor of Biblical Studies and Northwest Semitic Languages at the University of California, Los Angeles.

He has a B.A. in religion from George Fox University in Newberg, Oregon, an M.A. in historical geography of ancient Israel, from Jerusalem University College, and an M.A. and Ph.D. in Near Eastern and Judaic studies, from Brandeis University.

Schniedewind serves on the steering committees for both the Center for the Study of Religion and the Center for Jewish Studies at UCLA. He serves as network editor for the Dead Sea Scrolls & Second Temple Judaism section of Religious Studies Review. He serves on the editorial boards for the Bulletin of the American Schools of Oriental Research, the Journal of Biblical Literature, and Tel Aviv. He was a trustee and the secretary of the Albright Institute of Archaeological Research.

An article in The Christian Century refers to Schniedewind as having demonstrated in his book How the Bible Became a Book his knowledge of the archaeology of ancient Israel, the history of the Hebrew language, and the development of historical literature based on the Bible.

Schniedewind is listed in the 2007 Distinguished Lecturer Series Speaker Biographies in the Dead Sea Scroll exhibition at the San Diego Natural History Museum.

Schniedewind was the director of the Qumran Visualization Project (QVP), which created a virtual reality model of ancient Qumran under the auspices of UCLA's Experiential Technologies Center (which also has notable projects for 2nd Temple Jerusalem, Islamic Jerusalem, and Ancient Rome).

Schniedewind has participated in excavations and surveys in Israel, including Tell es-Safi, Wadi Qumran, Har Tuv, and Tel Batash, and is currently the Associate Director of UCLA's Jaffa Cultural Heritage Project.

== Bibliography ==
- Who Really Wrote the Bible: The Story of the Scribes (Princeton, 2024)
- The Finger of the Scribe: How Scribes Learned to Write the Bible (Oxford, 2019)
- A Social History of Hebrew: Its Origins Through the Rabbinic Period (Yale, 2013), ISBN 0300176686
- The El-Amarna Correspondence (2 Vol. Set): A New Edition of the Cuneiform Letters from the Site of El-Amarna Based on Collations of All Extant Tablets (by Anson F. Rainey, volume 1 edited by W. Schniedewind) (Brill, 2014), ISBN 9004281452
- A Primer on Ugaritic: Language, Culture, and Literature (with Joel Hunt) (Cambridge, 2007), ISBN 978-0-521-87933-0
- How the Bible Became a Book: The Textualization of Ancient Israel (Cambridge, 2004), ISBN 0521536227
- Society and the Promise to David: A Reception History of 2 Samuel 7:1-17 (Oxford, 1999), ISBN 0-19-512680-7
- The Word of God in Transition: From Prophet to Exegete in the Second Temple Period (Sheffield, 1995), ISBN 1-85075-550-7
