= Qumran =

Archaeological site in the West Bank

- קומראן (Hebrew) خربة قمران (Arabic)
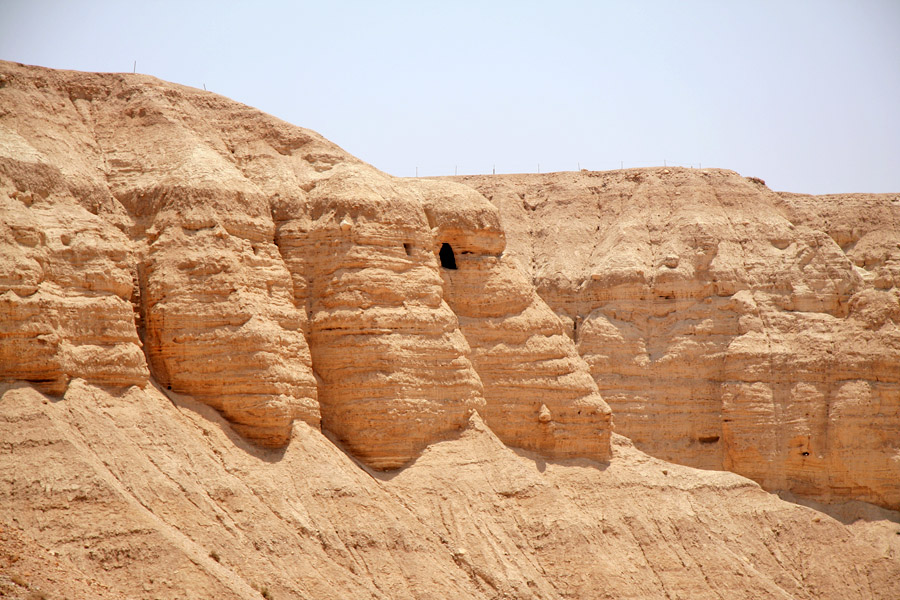
- Caves at Qumran

- Location within State of Palestine
- 31°44′27″N 35°27′31″E
- Type: Settlement
- Periods: Hellenistic to Roman period
- Cultures: Second Temple Judaism
- Associated with: Hasmoneans, Essenes(?)
- Location: Kalya
- Region: West Bank

History
- Built: Between 134 and 104 BCE or slightly later
- Abandoned: 68 CE or shortly after

Site notes
- Condition: In ruins
- Management: Israel Nature and Parks Authority
- Public access: yes

Qumran (/ˈkʊmrɑːn/; Hebrew: קומראן; Arabic: خربة قمران, romanized: Khirbet Qumrān) is an archaeological site in the West Bank managed by Israel's Qumran National Park. It is located on a dry marl plateau about 1.5 km (1 mi) from the northwestern shore of the Dead Sea, about 10 km (6 mi) south of the historic city of Jericho, and adjacent to the modern Israeli settlement and kibbutz of Kalya.

The Hellenistic period settlement was constructed during the reign of Hasmonean leader John Hyrcanus (134–104 BCE) or somewhat later. Qumran was inhabited by a Jewish sect of the late Second Temple period, which most scholars identify with the Essenes; however, other Jewish groups were also suggested. It was occupied most of the time until 68 CE and was destroyed by the Romans during the First Jewish–Roman War, possibly as late as 73 CE. It was later used by Jewish rebels during the Bar Kokhba Revolt. Today, the Qumran site is best known as the settlement nearest to the Qumran Caves where the Dead Sea Scrolls were hidden, caves in the sheer desert cliffs and beneath, in the marl terrace. The principal excavations at Qumran were conducted by Roland de Vaux in the 1950s, and several later digs have been carried out.

Since the 1967 Six-Day War, Qumran has been managed by the Israel Nature and Parks Authority.

== History ==
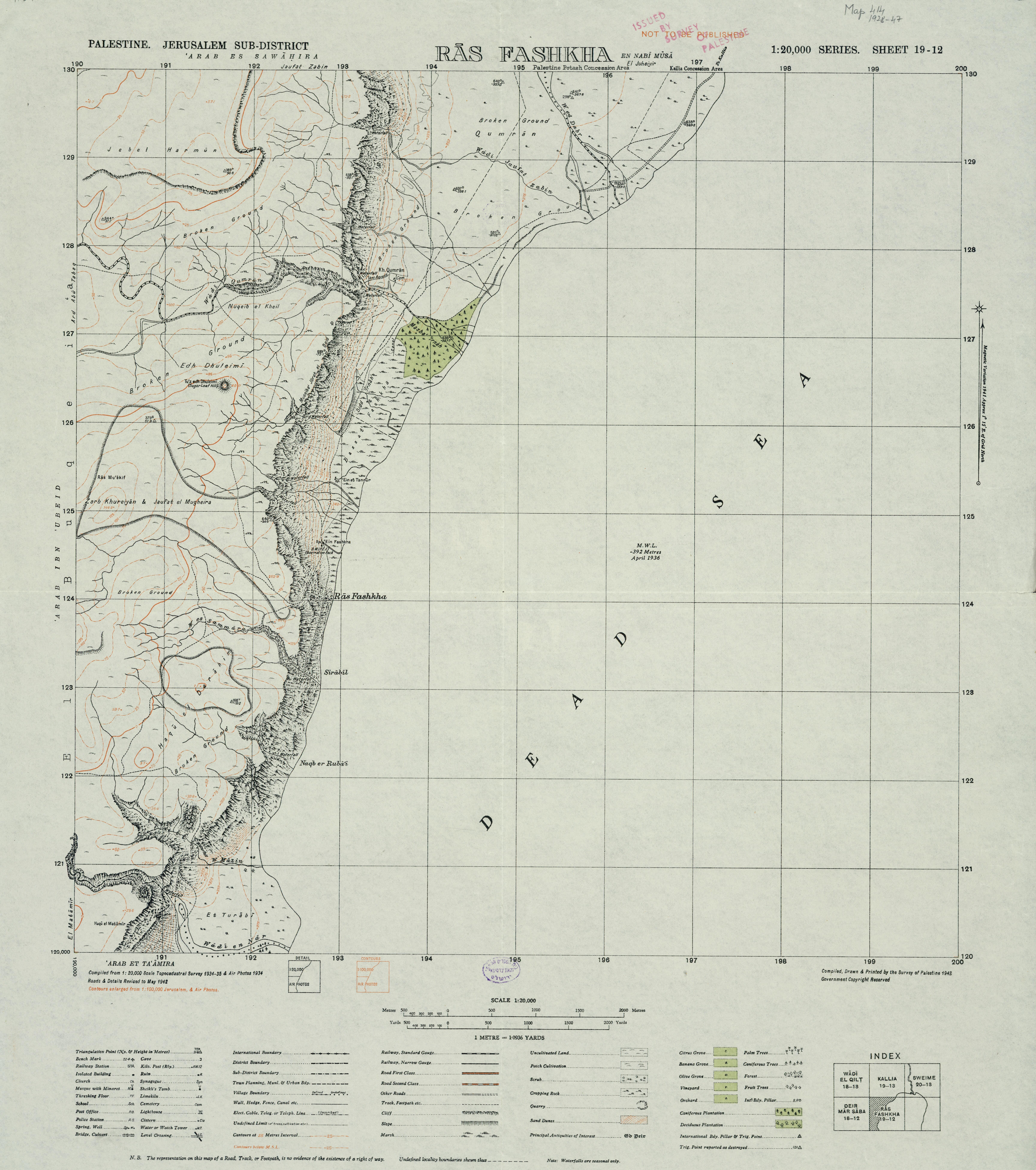
Qumran and the surrounding area in a 1942 Survey of Palestine map

Since the discovery of the Dead Sea Scrolls in 1947–1956, extensive excavations have taken place in Qumran. Nearly 900 scrolls were discovered. Most were written on parchment and some on papyrus. Cisterns, Jewish ritual baths, and cemeteries have been found, along with a dining or assembly room and debris from an upper story alleged by some to have been a scriptorium as well as pottery kilns and a tower.

Many scholars believe the location was home to a Jewish sect, probably the Essenes. But, according to Lawrence Schiffman, the rules of the community, its heavy stress on priesthood and the Zadokite legacy, and other details indicate a Sadducean-oriented sect either distinct from or one of the various Essene groupings. Others propose non-sectarian interpretations, some of these starting with the notion that it was a Hasmonean fort that was later transformed into a villa for a wealthy family, or a production center, perhaps a pottery factory or something similar.

=== Qumran cemeteries ===
A large cemetery was discovered to the east of the site. Besides this primary cemetery, there are also three separate extensions of it, as well as the north cemetery (about 10 minutes away from the primary) and a cemetery south of Wadi Qumran.

While most of the graves contain the remains of males, some females were also discovered, though some burials may be from medieval times. Only a small portion of the graves were excavated, as excavating cemeteries is forbidden under Jewish law. Over a thousand bodies are buried at Qumran cemetery. One theory is that bodies were those of generations of sectarians, while another is that they were brought to Qumran because burial was easier there than in rockier surrounding areas.

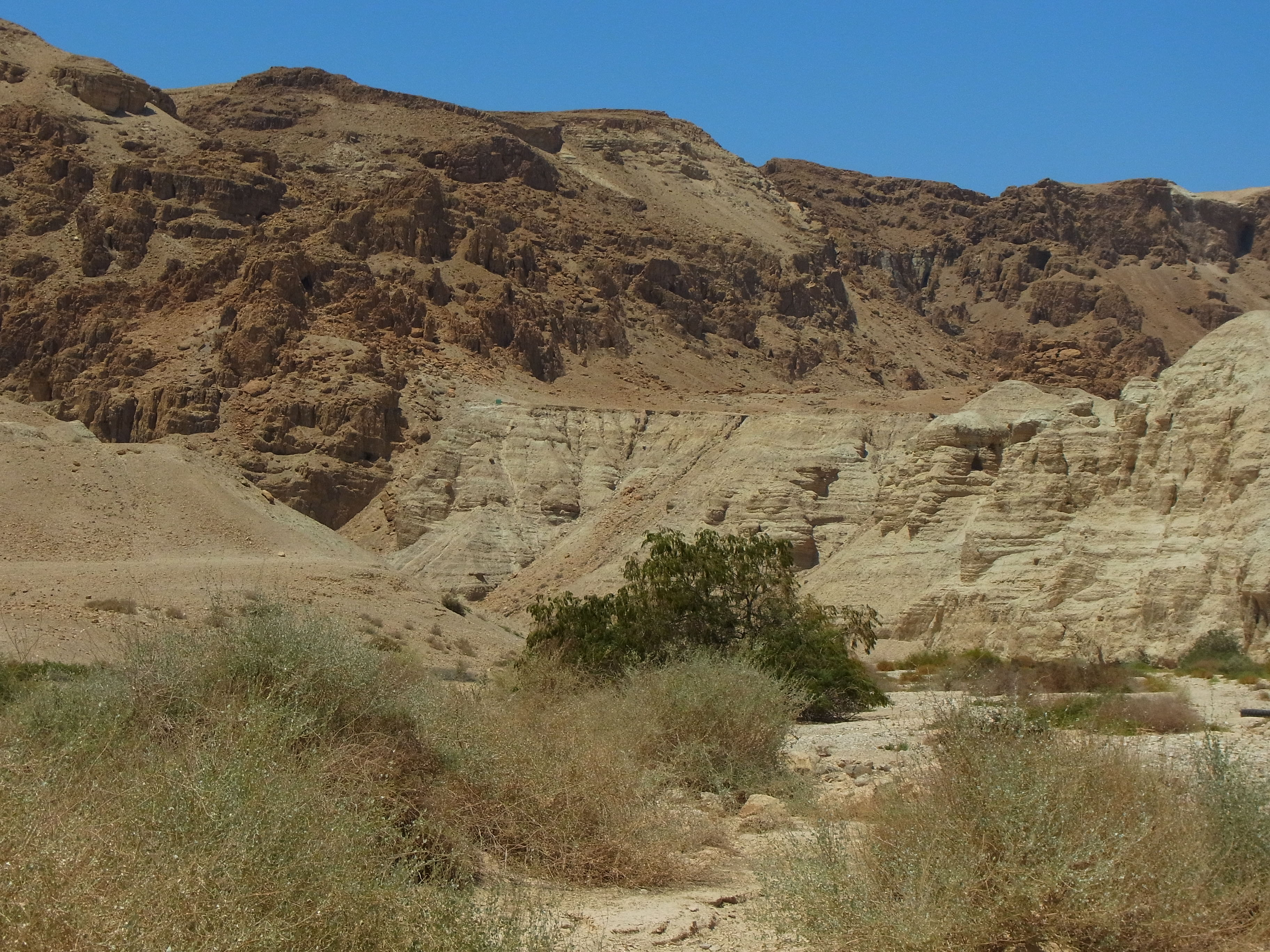
Caves of Qumran

The scrolls were found in a series of eleven caves around the settlement, some accessible only through the settlement. Some scholars have claimed that the caves were the permanent libraries of the sect, due to the presence of the remains of a shelving system. Other scholars believe that some caves also served as domestic shelters for those living in the area. Many of the texts found in the caves appear to represent widely accepted Jewish beliefs and practices, while other texts appear to speak of divergent, unique, or minority interpretations and practices. Some scholars believe that some of these texts describe the beliefs of the inhabitants of Qumran, who may have been Essenes, or the asylum for supporters of the traditional priestly family of the Zadokites against the Hasmonean priest/kings. A literary epistle published in the 1990s expresses reasons for creating a community, some of which resemble Sadducean arguments in the Talmud. Most of the scrolls seem to have been hidden in the caves during the turmoil of the First Jewish–Roman War (66–73 CE), although some of them may have been deposited earlier.

== Discovery and excavation ==
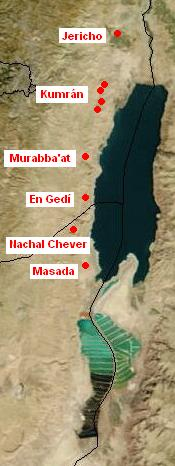
Location of Qumran and other nearby sites

=== Early site analysis ===
The site of Khirbet Qumran had been known to European explorers since the 19th century. The initial attention of the early explorers was focused on the cemetery, beginning with de Saulcy in 1851. In fact, the first excavations at Qumran (prior to the development of modern methodology) were of burials in the cemetery, conducted by Henry Poole in 1855 followed by Charles Clermont-Ganneau in 1873.

Albert Isaacs, British counsel James Finn, and photographer James Graham visited Qumran in December 1856. Isaacs stated regarding Qumran's tower, "It can hardly be doubted that this formed a tower or stronghold of some kind. The situation is commanding, and well adapted for defensive operations." Finn later suggested Qumran was "some ancient fort with a cistern".

The British scholar Ernest William Gurney Masterman visited Qumran on several occasions between 1900 and 1901. After observing the positioning of Qumran atop a plateau overlooking the ‘Ein Feshkha Springs, he concluded the ruins "may have very well been once a small fortress". Masterman also questioned why a small fort would require a graveyard of over one thousand tombs.

Gustaf Dalman visited Qumran in 1914, and explicitly identified Qumran as a burg, or fort. Archaeologist Michael Avi-Yonah agreed with Dalman's identification of Qumran as a fort and published a map that identified the remains at Qumran as part of a string of fortresses along the southeastern Judean border.

=== Major excavations ===
The discovery of the first Dead Sea scrolls was made by bedouins of the Ta'amireh tribe. Full-scale work at the site began after Roland de Vaux and Gerald Lankester Harding in 1949 excavated what became known as Cave 1, the first scroll-bearing cave. A cursory surface survey that year produced nothing of interest, but continued interest in the scrolls led to a more substantial analysis of the ruins at Qumran in 1951. This analysis yielded traces of pottery closely related to that found in Cave 1. This discovery led to intensive excavations at the site over a period of six seasons (1951–1956) under the direction of De Vaux. The most-prized find at Qumran up to this time were three small juglets containing over five-hundred silver coins, which were found in a room on the west side of the monastery. They consisted of tetradrachmae that had been minted in Tyre at various times in the first-century BCE.

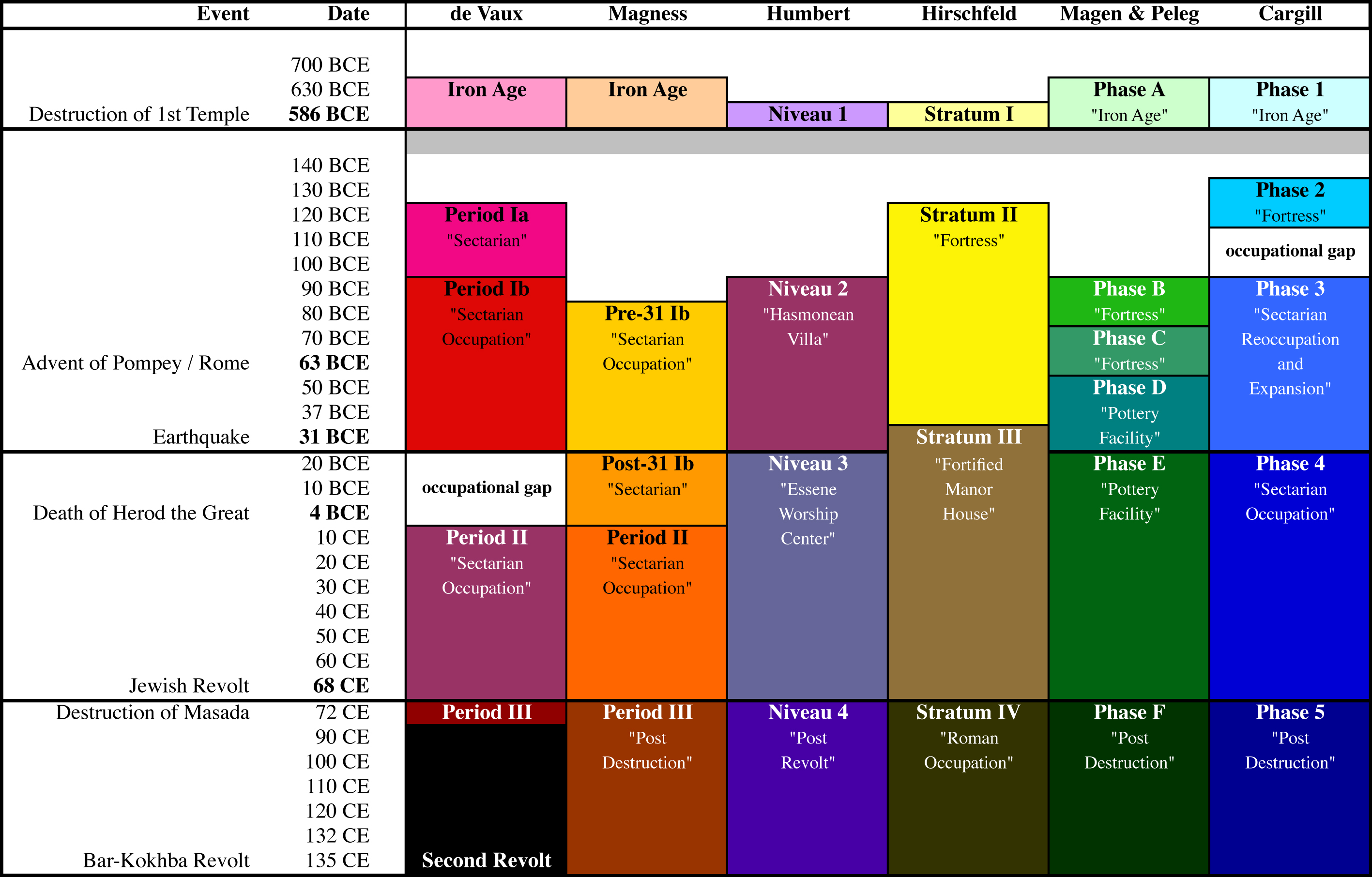
Chart of various proposed chronologies of Qumran.

The Iron Age remains at the site, which were modest but included a LMLK seal, led de Vaux to identify Qumran as the City of Salt listed in Josh 15:62. The site, however, may be identified with Secacah, which is referenced in the same area as the City of Salt in the Book of Joshua 15:61. Secacah is mentioned in the Copper Scroll, and the water works of Secacah that are described in this source are consistent with those of Qumran. The excavations revealed that after the Iron Age, Qumran was principally in use from the Hasmonean times until some time after the destruction of the temple by Titus in 70 CE. De Vaux divided this use into three periods:

- Period I, the Hasmonean era, which he further divided in two:
  - Period Ia, the time of John Hyrcanus
  - Period Ib, the latter Hasmoneans, ending with an earthquake and fire in 31 BCE (this was followed by a hiatus in de Vaux's interpretation of the site)
- Period II, the Herodian era, starting in 4 BCE on up to the destruction of the site apparently at the hands of the Romans during the Jewish War
- Period III, a reoccupation in the ruins

De Vaux's periodization has been challenged by both Jodi Magness and Yizhar Hirschfeld.

The site that de Vaux uncovered divides into two main sections: a main building, a squarish structure of two stories featuring a central courtyard and a defensive tower on its north-western corner; and a secondary building to the west. The excavation revealed a complex water system that had supplied water to several stepped cisterns, some quite large, located in various parts of the site. Two of these cisterns were within the walls of the main building.

Both the buildings and the water system evince signs of consistent evolution throughout the life of the settlement. with frequent additions, extensions and improvements. The water channel was raised to carry water to newer cisterns farther away and a dam was placed in the upper section of Wadi Qumran to secure more water, which was brought to the site by an aqueduct. Rooms were added, floors were raised, pottery ovens relocated and locations were repurposed.

De Vaux found three inkwells at Qumran (Loci 30 (2) and 31) and over the following years more inkwells have come to light with a Qumran origin. Jan Gunneweg identified a fourth (locus 129). S. Steckoll found a fifth (reportedly near the scriptorium). Magen and Peleg found a sixth inkwell. Without counting the Ein Feshkha inkwell or others with debated provenance, that number is more inkwells than found at any other site of the Second Temple Period, a significant indication of writing at Qumran.

Roland de Vaux died in 1971 without having provided a full report on the excavations at Qumran. In 1986 the École Biblique appointed the Belgian archaeologist Robert Donceel to the task of publishing the final results of de Vaux's excavations. Preliminary findings were presented at a conference in New York in 1992, but a final report never eventuated. According to Pauline Donceel-Voûte the final report was impossible to write, because many artifacts had been lost or corrupted (in particular, according to the Donceels, some of the coins excavated by Roland de Vaux from Qumran had been lost.) To fill the gap, the École had a synthesis of de Vaux's field notes published in 1994. This volume included several hundred photographs, 48 pages of measurement, and summary descriptions of the field diaries. An English translation of the field notes synthesis was published in 2003. Two later books, devoted to the interpretation of the excavations of de Vaux, were published by Jean-Baptiste Humbert in 2003 and 2016. However, not all of de Vaux's archaeological findings from Qumran (which are stored in the Rockefeller Museum) have yet been published; some are still inaccessible to scholars and the public.

=== De Vaux's interpretations ===
De Vaux interpreted his findings at Qumran based (at least in part) upon information in the Dead Sea Scrolls—which continued to be discovered in the nearby caves throughout his excavations. De Vaux concluded that the remains at Qumran were left by a sectarian religious community. Using his excavations as well as textual sources, including the Dead Sea Scrolls and the historical accounts recorded by Pliny the Elder, Philo, and Flavius Josephus, de Vaux's conclusion was that the inhabitants of the site were a sect of highly ritualistic Jews called the Essenes, a conclusion that has come to be known as the "Qumran–Essene hypothesis". This hypothesis suggests that the original residents of the settlement were the Essenes, and that they established the site in the desert for religious purposes.

He interpreted the room above locus 30 as a "scriptorium" because he discovered inkwells there. A plastered bench was also discovered in the remains of an upper story. De Vaux concluded that this was the area where the Essenes could have written some of the Dead Sea Scrolls. De Vaux also interpreted locus 77 as a "refectory", or a community dining hall, based on the discovery of numerous sets of bowls in the nearby "pantry" of locus 89. Additionally, de Vaux interpreted many of the numerous stepped cisterns as "miqva’ot", or Jewish ritual baths, due to their similarity to several stepped and partitioned ritual baths near the Jerusalem Temple Mount.

Regarding the scrolls de Vaux cautiously stated that "manuscripts were copied in the scriptorium of Qumran... We may also suppose... that certain works were composed at Khirbet Qumran. But beyond this we cannot go." He believed that the Essenes later hid the scrolls in the nearby caves when they felt their safety was in danger.

=== Further excavations and surveys ===
Although de Vaux's excavations of Qumran were quite exhaustive, and thereby the most important source of information on the settlement, there have been several excavations since de Vaux finished his work. As de Vaux left little of the settlement unexcavated, later archaeologists have often turned elsewhere to continue research, including dump sites from de Vaux's excavations. During the 1960s, according to Catherine Murphy, there were some unpublished excavations at Qumran by John Allegro and by Solomon Steckoll. Steckoll also carried out work in the cemetery, excavating twelve tombs. In 1967 restoration work was performed at Qumran by R.W. Dajjani of the Department of Antiquities of Jordan.

In 1984 and 1985 Joseph Patrich and Yigael Yadin carried out a systematic survey of the caves and pathways around Qumran. Between 1985 and 1991 Patrich excavated five caves, including Caves 3Q and 11Q. One of Patrich's conclusions was that the caves "did not serve as habitations for the members of the Dead Sea Sect, but rather as stores and hiding places".

From mid-November 1993 to January 1994 the Israel Antiquities Authority carried out works in the Qumran compound and nearby installations as part of "Operation Scroll" under the direction of Amir Drori and Yitzhak Magen. In the winter of 1995–1996 and later seasons Magen Broshi and Hanan Eshel carried out further excavations in the caves north of Qumran; they also dug in the cemetery and in marl terrace caves. In 1996 James Strange and others dug at Qumran using remote sensing equipment. From 1996 to 1999 and later Yitzhak Magen and Yuval Peleg carried out excavations at Qumran under the auspices of the National Parks Authority. Randall Price and Oren Gutfeld dug on the Qumran plateau, seasons in 2002, 2004 and 2005 (and plan a 2010 season). Some new discoveries have been made.

== Recent archaeological analysis ==
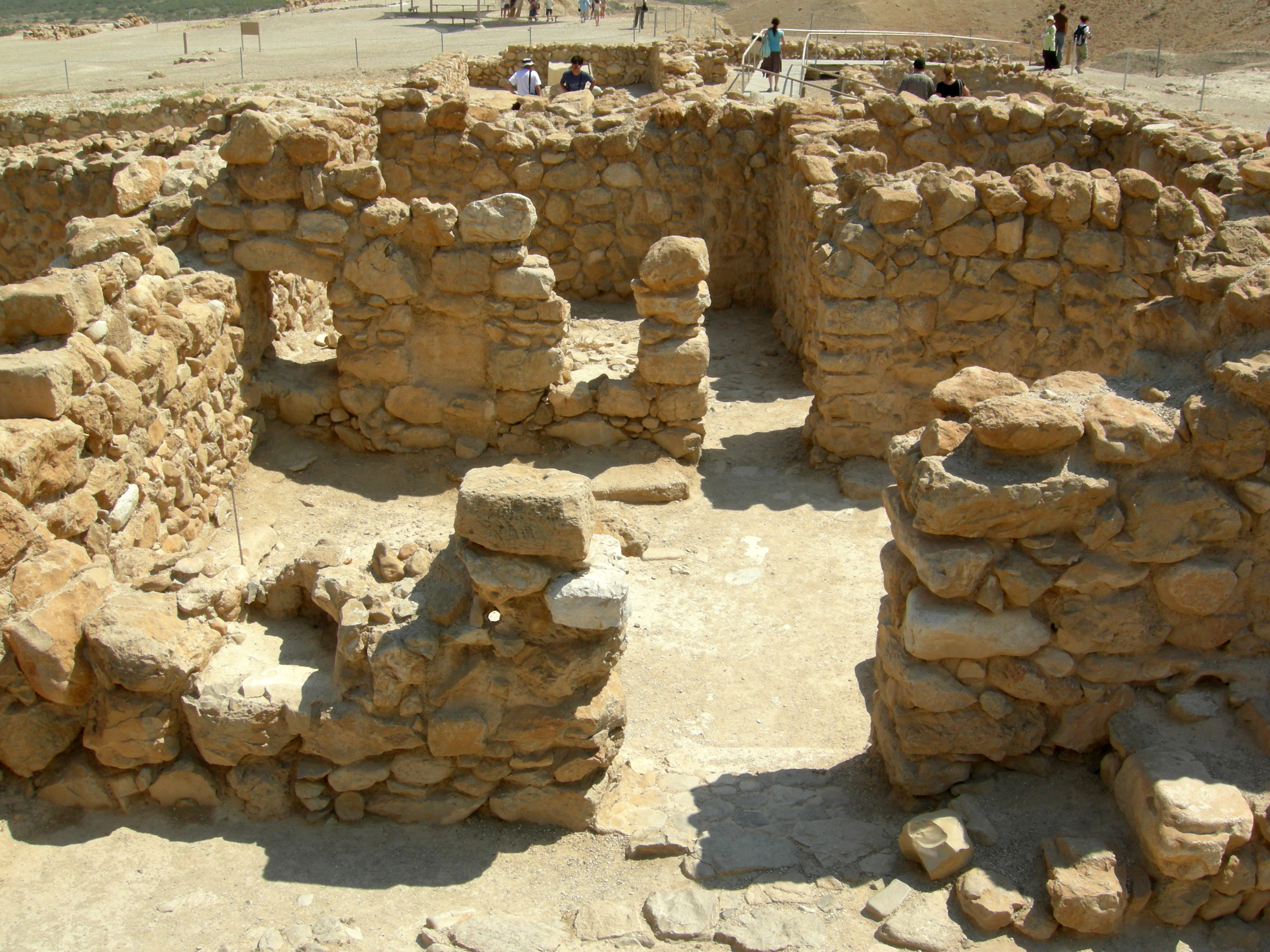
Rooms on the western side of the main building at Qumran.

Most of the small finds from the de Vaux excavations were taken back to Jerusalem to be used in later excavation reports for Qumran, but the death of Roland de Vaux brought a halt to the reports and the small finds were left to gather dust on shelves in museum backrooms. In the late 1980s, archaeologist Robert Donceel worked on the de Vaux materials in a new effort towards publishing excavation reports. He found artifacts he believed did not fit the religious settlement model, including "sophisticated glass and stoneware". In 1992 Pauline Donceel-Voute put forward the Roman villa model in an attempt to explain these artifacts. In 2002 archaeologists Minna and Kenneth Lönnqvist published their archaeological and spatial studies at Qumran bringing another view to the settlement interpretations including the astronomical orientations of some structures at Qumran. A recent final publication of the French excavations by Jean-Baptist Humbert outlining evidence of a decorated frieze, opus sectile, fine columns etc., indicates a phase of a wealthier occupation, "une grande maison", at Qumran.

=== Pottery ===
The range of pottery, glass and high quantity of coins found at Qumran do not sit well in the context of a sectarian settlement according to the Donceels. These materials point to trade connections in the area, and provide evidence that Qumran may not have been in a vacuum in the Graeco-Roman period. Rachel Bar-Nathan has argued from similarities between pottery finds at Qumran and at the Hasmonean and Herodian palaces of Jericho that Qumran should be seen as part of the Jordan valley context, rather than as an isolated site. While the cylindrical "scroll jars" from Qumran were once thought unique, she cites a proposed similar find at Jericho, shows a related form existed at Masada, and reports that such jars have been found at Qalandiya. Bar-Nathan states from the Jericho palace data that, "It is possible to trace the typological development of this group of jars", i.e., the cylindrical jars. Jodi Magness, citing Bar-Nathan's M.A. thesis on the Jericho pottery data, refers to cylindrical jars at Jericho, saying "[a]t Jericho, most of these jars .. come from an industrial area dating to the time of Herod". Jan Gunneweg observed that the supposed single partial parallel at Jericho – "a partly preserved rim and neck with a vertical loop handle" – is in fact not a "scroll" jar. Another one was reported found in Jordan in a later burial near Abila but no photos or drawings were published and the jar has not been relocated, showing de Vaux sought parallels. Taking into account subtypes of pottery, true cylindrical "scroll" jars are not common outside Qumran. They are, however, clearly not unique to Qumran. Bar-Nathan noted the jar's "rarity in the Second Temple period". Of some of the proposed parallel Masada jars, Bar-Nathan wrote "It seems that this group of storage jars was brought (or pillaged?) from the area of Qumran and probably also from the Plain of Jericho."

=== Ostraca ===
More than 50 ostraca have been found at Qumran, with most dating from the first century BCE to the first century CE. There are two known inscriptions from the earlier First Temple period, including a LMLK seal and an inked inscription seemingly from the 7th century BCE. Examples from the site's main settlement period include ostraca bearing personal names, such as Yohanan Hatla, Eleazar, Honiah, Meshullam, Phinehas, and Ishmael, as well as an ostracon reading אלעזר / בר ישוע / הנורית, apparently identifying an individual by name and patronym. Other content labels include "mixed" (מעורבת), probably referring to vessel contents, and what seems to be, as reconstructed, "old preserved vegetables" (כבשות ישנות). Epigraphist Haggai Misgav suggests that such Hebrew content labels may have halakhic significance, including regarding tithes.

A smaller group consists of writing exercises, alphabetic sequences, trials of writing implements, or unintelligible letter strings. The ostracon סעפ is described as part of an alphabetic sequence and probably a writing exercise, while another longer string of letters is unintelligible; according to Misgav, if it is not a writing exercise, it may have had a magical connotation. One prominent ostracon was read by Frank Moore Cross and Hanan Eshel as a deed of gift connected to the "Yahad", that is, the Qumran sect, but epigraphist Ada Yardeni's corrected reading removes that direct sectarian link, and Misgav states that most scholars now regard it as a regular deed of gift of land, probably written in Jericho and later brought to Qumran. Misgav notes that rather than pointing to more sectarian activity, the ostraca reflect agricultural production, storage, recordkeeping, and occasional legal activity, broadly comparable to ostraca from Machaerus, Masada, and Ein Feshkha.

=== Cisterns ===
Many scholars have viewed the several large stepped cisterns at Qumran as ritual baths. This supports the religious settlement model. There are difficulties in understanding all these cisterns as baths, however. Qumran's water arrived perhaps twice a year from rainwater runoff. Water was one of Qumran's most valued commodities, and water management is an integral part of the site, as seen with the numerous cisterns and channels. If the large cisterns were ritual baths, the water would sit getting dirtier through ritual bathing throughout the year and was extremely infrequently replenished by the run off. The current state of analysis of the cisterns is still unresolved, but Katharina Galor suggests a mixed usage of the stepped cisterns as both ritual baths and water storage. According to the Israeli archaeologists Magen and Peleg, the clay found in the cisterns was used for pottery factory facilities.

The construction of the Qumran aqueduct that fed the cisterns and the baths can be seen as an important chronological marker. Although there are some disagreements in this area, Stacey (2004) argues that it should be dated to around 95-90 BCE, which is during de Vaux's Period Ib.

=== Numismatic studies ===
Coins from Qumran are one of the most important groups of primary evidence from the ancient site. Much of what has been written on the chronology, the occupational periods and the history of Qumran is based on the preliminary report and lecture by the original excavator, Roland de Vaux in 1961, which was translated in 1973. A tentative list of the Qumran bronze coins along with Roland de Vaux's field diary from the excavations was published in 1994 in French, in German in 1996 and in English in 2003. The first reconstruction of the Qumran bronze coinage, including a complete coin catalogue with up-dated and cross-referenced coin identifications, was done by Kenneth Lönnqvist and Minna Lönnqvist in 2005. Also in 1955, three very important silver coin hoards were found at Qumran. The first lot of the Qumran silver coins was published by Marcia Sharabani in 1980. The last two hoards located in Amman, Jordan, were published by Kenneth Lönnqvist in 2007.

==== The bronze coinage ====
De Vaux's excavations uncovered about 1250 coins (569 silver and 681 bronze coins) altogether from Qumran, though today some Qumran coins have been lost, some lots mixed-up, and records less accurate than ideal.

There are a surprisingly high number of coins from the site. This means that the site was highly monetized in the Hellenistic and Roman periods, i.e. that the occupants of Qumran were not a community of poor and isolated people. That the flow of cash at Qumran may have been large in the 1st century CE is hardly surprising given the archaeological evidence of trade at Qumran in luxury goods such as glass, which is specifically dated to this period.

The coin profile of Qumran shows that there do not appear to have been any major changes in the role of coins and money in the economic system at Qumran during any of the occupational periods from ca. 150 BCE. to 73 CE. Worth noting here is that the amount of coins found at Qumran suggests according to numismatic principles of loss and survival of ancient coins that millions of bronze coins must have circulated at Qumran.

The bronze coins identified from Qumran, some dating to the second and third years of the Jewish War, indicate that the site was still in use in 68 CE and only destroyed after 70, perhaps as late as 73. The coins from Qumran of this period end with a peculiar series of bronze coins minted in 72/73 at Ascalon, which sent auxiliary troops to assist the Roman army in the First Jewish–Roman War (66–73).

In 73 the Romans stormed the mountain fortress of Masada, which also was located on the western bank of the Dead Sea. It is more than likely that Qumran was destroyed this same time, as the coin finds from Qumran end with the same peculiar bronze coins minted at Ascalon.

==== The silver coinage ====
According to the publications prior to 2007, the most recent silver coin in the Qumran hoard(s) is a tetradrachm of Tyre from the year 9/8 BCE.

===== Lönnqvist analysis of 2007 =====
The publication of the bulk of the silver coins by K. A. K. Lönnqvist, and his regional analysis, resulted, in 2007, in a new interpretations as to the importance, chronology and significance of the coins. According to Lönnqvist, the newly dated coins in the silver coin hoards give an earliest possible burial date for the coin hoards to 52/3–66 CE, based on an interpretation of a countermark. However, the archaeological and numismatic nature of the silver coin hoard burials may suggest that the coin hoards may have been buried in the early 3rd century. The final coin was minted in Rome between 206 and 210, during the reign of the emperor Caracalla.

The new suggestion made is that the silver coin hoards from Qumran may be connected to Roman military campaigns in the region, as these are widely attested in the early 3rd century CE. It is also quite possible that the silver was part of Roman army payments made to troops in a local garrison.

According to Lönnqvist, the technical evidence of the recording and documenting of the Qumran silver coin hoards in 2006–2007 showed that the coins came from lots, groups or batches of coins that originated in a few or one single large payment. This payment may have come from a mint, bank or an authority like the treasury of the Roman army. The new evidence refutes the possibility that the silver coins could have been collected from single individuals, for instance, as tax payments, or that Qumran could have been a regional 'tax house'.

The new 2007 analysis of the silver coinage contradicts the findings of de Vaux, Seyrig, and Spijkerman as well as the findings of Robert Donceel. Donceel was surprised to find in the Amman museum unrecorded coins, notably denarius coins of Trajan, that he claimed were intrusive. The original Amman Museum records of the Qumran coin hoards and the museum bags where the coins were kept do not support the hypothesis that the 2nd- and 3rd-century Roman coins are intrusive in relation to the Tyrian silver.

Furthermore, the new countermark that went unrecorded is apparently from 52/53 CE and the Greek letters in it do not support a date of 9/8 BCE, as the other countermarks. This means archaeologically and numismatically that at least one, but probably two minimum, of the three hoards post-date de Vaux's suggestion of a burial date after 9/8 BCE.

The unusual and intensive die-linkage of the Qumran silver hoards suggest that the three hoards were buried at the same time, and this would mean at the earliest in 52/53 CE.

According to Lönnqvist, a highly unusual type of coin hoard found at Ain Hanaziv in the Jordan Valley in the early 1960 and reported in the Israel Numismatic Bulletin supports his theory of a third-century CE date for the three silver coin hoards from Qumran. This Ain Hanaziv coin hoard spanned hundreds of years, starting from the Seleucid era and ended with the same kind of coins from the reign of Septimius Severus in 210.

Therefore, according to Lönnqvist, claiming an earlier date for the silver hoards is untenable and contradicts the first complete recording of the Qumran silver hoards made by him in 2007, which includes the first photographic evidence of the coin hoards, and the regional coin evidence from other hoards. It has already been shown that de Vaux's dating system of Qumran and the silver coin hoards was based on what is generally known as a circular argument; the end of the first major settlement period was dated after the assumed date of hiding of the coin hoards, which in turn dated the coin hoards themselves.

Nevertheless, Lönnqvist's theories have been criticized by Farhi and Price. They point to the fact that the identity of the silver coins from Qumran held at the Amman Museum in Jordan is not certain.

=== Qumran disc ===
A small limestone disc was discovered at Qumran in 1954 during the excavations of Roland de Vaux, who catalogued it without much notice. This Qumran disc is about 14.5 cm (6 in) in diameter. The historical context of this discovery is believed to be during the Period lb or II of Qumran (ca. 103 BCE-68 CE). Much later, in the late 1990s, some scholars examined it closely, and identified it as a sundial.

The discovery of the sundial is significant because it provides material evidence of Qumran community's interest in measuring time. This is consistent with the keen interest in calendars and time-keeping methods as seen in numerous Dead Sea Scrolls.

=== Population at Qumran ===
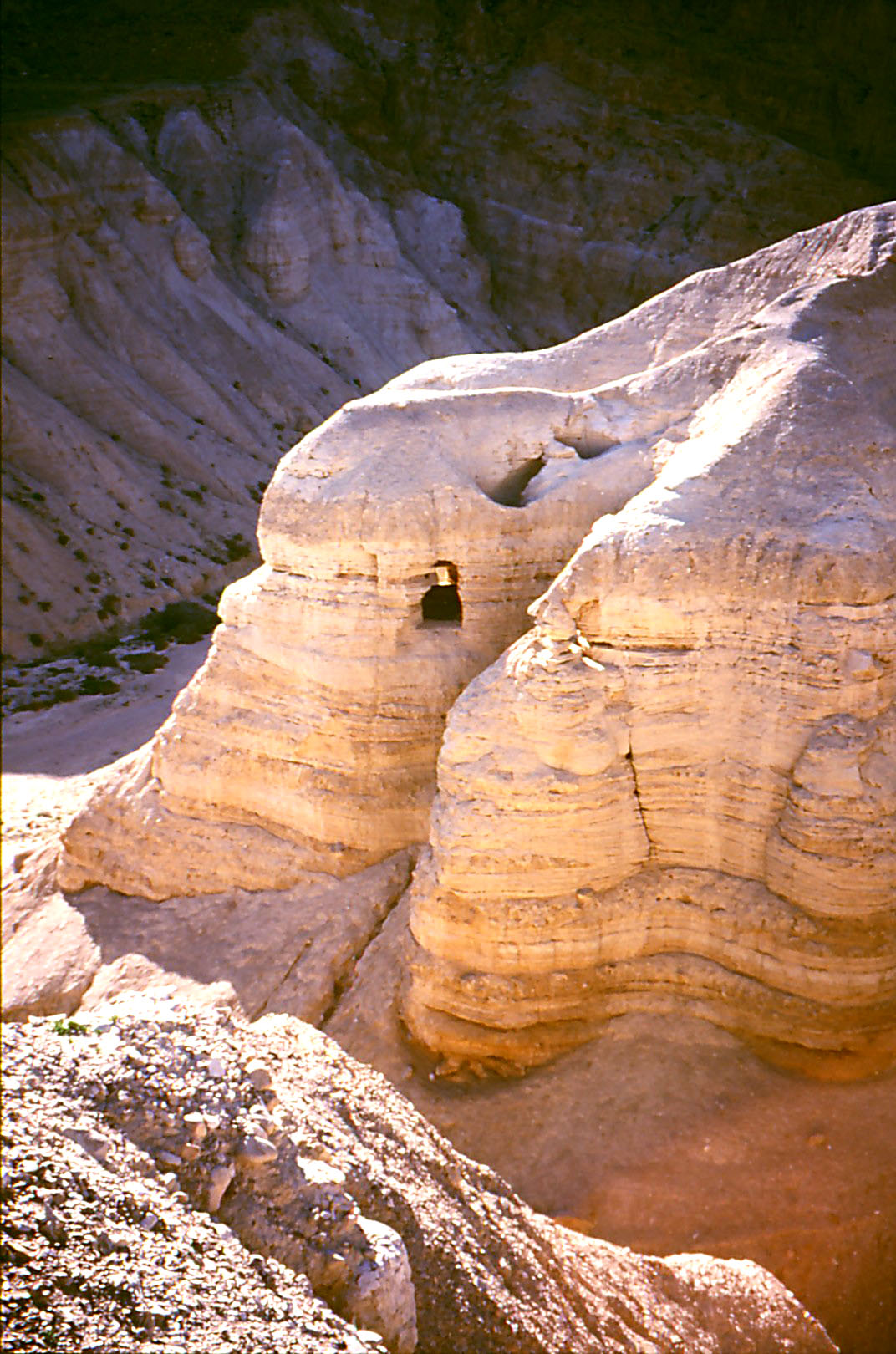
Qumran Caves

One important issue for the understanding of the site of Qumran is a realistic calculation of its population. Using estimates based on the size of the cemetery and average lifespan de Vaux calculated that the inhabitants "would not have numbered many more than 200 members". He noted that "[t]here is a manifest disproportion between the number of tombs and the number of inhabitants for whom there was room in the buildings". This led him to speculate whether the caves were used as lodgings for his estimated 200 inhabitants. J.T. Milik some years earlier provided an estimate of between 150 and 200 as the average population, working on the comparison with the population of the monastery of Mar Saba, which numbered 150 monks in the 9th century and from Josephus' figure of 3,000 Essenes calculating that "at least five per cent lived the strict monastic life". E.M. Laperrousaz went as high as 1,428 inhabitants. Magen Broshi, analyzing the size of L77 (which he calls an assembly hall), estimated that about 120 to 150 people could sit there, to which he added a few dozen candidates to the population, yielding over 170 people.

From 1983 to 1987 Joseph Patrich carried out archaeological surveys around Qumran and its caves. He concluded that the caves were "stores and hiding places". He found no traces of permanent tent dwellings and that any "dwelling quarters should be sought inside the wall of Khirbet Qumran, mainly on the upper floor". Patrich estimated that the population was only 50–70 people. Magen Broshi and Hanan Eshel, revisiting the caves and the territory around Qumran in 1995–1996, later pointed out that Patrich's estimate was far too high for what Qumran could offer, reducing the number to 12–20. They turned back to caves (mainly artificial ones cut into the marl terrace most of which have not survived) and tents (pointing to pottery and nails found along one of the paths near Qumran), and staying with 150–200 inhabitants. While waiting for the publication of Broshi and Eshel's results, Patrich, anticipating them, doubted the possibility that there were once "significantly more habitable caves" cut into the marl, pointing to the lack of paths and suitable terrain. He went on to discount the significance of the nails for tent dwelling without "further substantial evidence and returned to a figure of "a few tens of residents, fifty at most". Jodi Magness accepted Broshi's estimate, adding "This number accords better than lower estimates with the presence of over 1000 dining dishes in the pantry (L86)."

Working from ratios of populations in other ancient settlements, Yizhar Hirschfeld estimated the population of Qumran thus: "If we use the lower value of fifteen people per dunam [1,000 m^{2}], it emerges that in the Hasmonean period only about 20 people occupied the site of Qumran. Yitzhak Magen and Yuval Peleg entered the discussion commenting on how one could feed such large numbers of community members: "Were we to accept the claim that the sect lived at Qumran for about 170 years, we would expect to find hundreds of cooking and baking ovens as well as thousands of cooking pots."

The population question is a complex issue, as can be seen by the above considerations. Much hinges on interpretation of two locations at Qumran—the refectory and the pantry. The search for extramural dwelling quarters has failed to provide substantial evidence. Discounting Laperrousaz's apparently excessively high estimate, a number of proposals put the population in and around Qumran at between 20 and 200 people.

== Qumran-Essene hypothesis ==
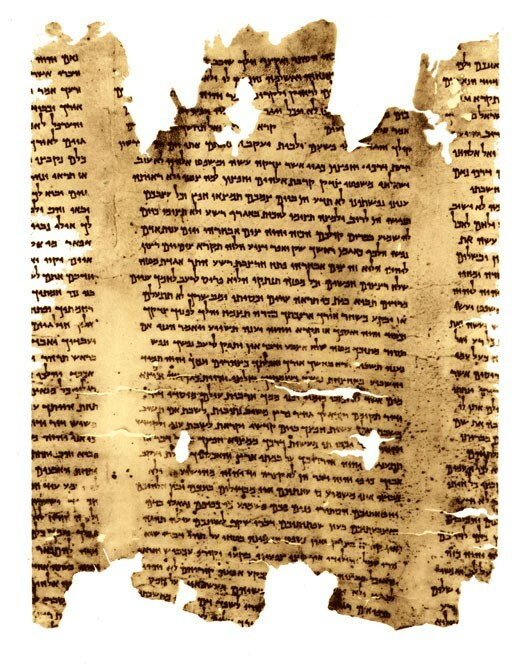
Dead Sea Scroll – part of Isaiah Scroll (Isa 57:17 – 59:9), 1QIsa^{b}

There were not many serious challenges to de Vaux's interpretation of the site of Qumran as a settlement of Essenes from the time it was introduced. While the archaeologist Ernest-Marie Laperrousaz had some quite divergent views, members of de Vaux's team followed approximately the same narrative, with minor deviations coming from other members, including Józef Milik and Frank Moore Cross. De Vaux's initial dig co-director, Gerald Lankester Harding, wrote an article in 1955 in which he presented Qumran as "a building in which John the Baptist, and probably Christ, studied: Khirbet Qumran". Others outside de Vaux's team, including Henri del Medico, Solomon Zeitlin, and Godfrey Rolles Driver, proposed other hypotheses, but their analyses received little lasting attention. More recently, Lawrence H. Schiffman has defended the hypothesis that the Qumran documents indicate a Sadducean sectarian orientation; scholars generally agree that the term "Essenes" likely encompassed a diversity of groups, but the sectarian Sadducean hypothesis remains a minority view. Simon J. Joseph agrees that the Qumran community was a part of the Essene movement, under the influence of the Enoch traditions, adding that they possessed a stronger focus towards eschatology and messianism.

In 1960, Karl Heinrich Rengstorf proposed that the Dead Sea Scrolls were not the product of the residents of Qumran but came from the library of the Temple in Jerusalem, despite their being discovered near Qumran. Rengstorf's basic Jerusalem proposal has become increasingly more popular since the materials from de Vaux's excavations of Qumran were brought into the public arena in 1992. James H. Charlesworth, in 1980, proposed that Qumran was damaged in the Parthian war c. 40 BCE.

Jean-Baptiste Humbert, who published de Vaux's field notes, proposes a hybrid solution to the debate surrounding Qumran. He accepts that the site might originally have been established as a villa rustica, that it was abandoned, and that Essenes reoccupied it in the late 1st century BCE. Humbert argues that the site may also have been used as a place where sectarian pilgrims—barred from entering Jerusalem—may have celebrated the pilgrimage.

Minna Lönnqvist and Kenneth Lönnqvist brought an approach to the Qumran studies based on contextual archaeology with its spatial studies and interpretation of the symbolic language of the archaeological data, positing that text scholars, who had only focused their studies on the scrolls, had removed the Dead Sea Scrolls from their archaeological context.

The Lönnqvists proposed that the orientations of the settlement and the graves indicate that both belonged to an intentional scheme based on a solar calendar. From this, they argued that the settlement and cemetery are connected to the Dead Sea Scrolls and associated with an Essene-type group, which finds the closest parallels in the contemporary Jewish Therapeutic group known to have lived in Egypt.

Robert Cargill argues that the theory suggesting Qumran was established as a Hasmonean fortress is not incompatible with the theory proposing that a group of Jewish sectarians reoccupied the site. Cargill suggests that Qumran was established as a Hasmonean fort (see below, "Qumran as fortress"), abandoned, and later reoccupied by Jewish settlers, who expanded the site in a communal, non-military fashion, and who were responsible for the Dead Sea Scrolls.

Some who challenged de Vaux's findings took issue with the practice of using the Dead Sea Scrolls to interpret the archaeological remains at Qumran. They argued that these remains should be interpreted independently, without any influence from the Dead Sea Scrolls. Various reinterpretations have led to various conclusions about the site. These include:

=== Qumran as fortress ===
The overlooked early suggestion that Qumran was a fortress was given new life by the analysis of Pessach Bar-Adon. Using de Vaux's Period 1a findings, his own excavations at Ain el-Ghuweir 15 km (9.3 mi) south of Qumran, and Mazar's level 2 at 'En-Gedi, Bar-Adon argued, "these fortresses [belonged] to John Hyrcanus, who needed a strong, comprehensive defence system commanding vital water sources, agricultural fields, flocks, Jordan River crossings, the plains of Jericho and the caravan routes in the Judean desert. He turned the Qumran-Ain Feshka oasis, like the one at En-Gedi, into crown property and incorporated his tenants into his strategic plans."

Norman Golb took up the notion that the Qumran settlement was established as a fortress and argued—against the prevailing views of the time—that not only was Qumran not established as a sectarian residence, but that there were no sectarians at the site at all. Like Rengstorf, he proposed that the Scrolls had been produced in Jerusalem, but unlike Rengstorf, Golb argues that the scrolls came from different libraries throughout Jerusalem and were hidden in the caves by Jews fleeing the Romans during a political uprising.

In 2022, Dennis Mizzi pointed out that the water system at Qumran was constructed in two phases, with the aqueduct built in the later phase (Period Ib). In connection with this, he also points out that, during Period Ia, the Qumran tower had not yet been constructed. He also says that this is indicated in de Vaux's original plan for Period Ia, although some other scholars disregarded this. According to Mizzi, “there was a stage when the settlement had no tower”, so this would cast doubt on the theory that from the beginning Qumran served as a fortress.

=== Qumran as villa ===
Robert Donceel and Pauline Donceel-Voûte focused their research on the small finds amongst de Vaux's unpublished materials from Qumran, including, but not limited to, glassware (55 newly catalogued items), stoneware (53 new items), metal wares, and coins. Contrary to the belief that the inhabitants of the site were poor monastics, Donceel and Donceel-Voûte suggest that the residents were actually wealthy traders, with connections to the upper class and wealthy in nearby Jerusalem. They ultimately suggest that Qumran was a villa rustica, or wealthy manor house, that may have been a winter or year-round second home for a wealthy family from Jerusalem. (At the same conference as Donceel's presentation, J. Magness reported that from what she saw of the pottery in the Rockefeller Museum, "there was very, very little in the way of fine wares". Eric Meyers, next, said "I concur; my visits also corroborate that. I see an affirmative nod from Professor Donceel-Voute." Rachel Bar-Nathan also notes, "[a]t Jericho, there is also a striking lack of luxury ware, with only a few painted shards in the whole repertoire.")

=== Qumran as commercial center ===
While the villa model has gained little support, the evidence it has tried to address has led to further attempts at explanation.

Lena Cansdale and Alan Crown argued for the first time that the settlement was a fortified road station and a port town on the shores of the Dead Sea, meaning that the site was actually a prominent commercial site (or "entrepot") on a major north–south trade route.

Yizhar Hirschfeld accepted that Qumran was originally a Hasmonean fortress. Citing his work at ‘Ein Feshkha as a comparison, he suggested that the site at Qumran ultimately became an agriculturally-based, fortified trading station during the Herodian era.

Yizhak Magen and Yuval Peleg have focused their 10-year excavation at Qumran upon the vast water system at Qumran. They accept that the site was originally a "forward field fort", but argue that it was repurposed as a pottery production plant and that the water system was actually used to bring clay-laced water into the site. This water was then directed to the pools, where the clay could fall to the bottom. The resulting sediment was then used for pottery production, according to these authors. Thus, Y. Magen and Y. Peleg proposed that Qumran was a pottery export site. Their excavations revealed a large amount of clay at the bottom of pool 71, which they used as part of their argument.

==== Pottery clay analysis ====
Samples of the clay found at Qumran have now been analyzed, as has the composition of various ceramic items. These studies indicate that much of Qumran pottery was not produced at the site. It appears that as much as two-thirds of Qumran pottery was not made from Qumran clay.

"This information goes straight against" the Magen Peleg proposal, according to scientists J. Gunneweg and M. Balla. J. Michniewicz responding to previous analyses of Balla and Gunneweg, wrote, "Balla and Gunneweg's conclusions are corroborated neither by information about which elements were taken for statistical interpretation and which determined the division particularly strongly.... nor by the reference data or statistical computation".

In 2020, Gunneweg responded to the objections of Michniewicz (as well as those of Joseph Yellin). While admitting the validity of some of the critics' objections, he defended the overall thesis as proposed by him and Balla in several publications.

There appears to be broad agreement in research since 2000 that much of the pottery found at Qumran was brought there from elsewhere.

"While it is not impossible that manufacturers brought clay from outside, the existence of multiple sources of clay (Jerusalem, Jericho, Motza, Beit ‘Ummar, and other unidentified sites) implies that many of the vessels were not locally made."

Based on Neutron Activation Analysis, Gunneweg and Balla classified the clay used for Qumran pottery in three broad groups. ‘Group I’ was identified as local to Qumran. It contained most of the ceramic items that were certainly made on the site, such as clay balls and oven covers. ‘Group II’ is connected to the areas around Hebron, which is close to the Beit ’Ummar and Motza clay deposits. And ‘Group III’ is localized to the deposits found around Jericho.

=== Qumran as part of the Jordan valley ===
Rachel Bar-Nathan rejects the claim that dishware found at Qumran shows any sectarian characteristic, and proposes that such pottery has also been found in varying quantities at Masada, Jericho and other sites in the region.

David Stacey argues that the settlement at Qumran is associated with the estate at Jericho. Due to the scarcity of year-round water at Qumran, he suggests that the site served as a seasonal tannery and pottery production facility.

=== Other issues ===
Recent scientific evidence published by Ira Rabin, Oliver Hahn, Timo Wolff, Admir Masic, and Gisela Weinberg demonstrates that the ink from The Thanksgiving Scroll uses water taken from the Dead Sea and its vicinity, thereby linking the Dead Sea region to at least some of the scrolls.

Paleographer Ada Yardeni analysed and listed dozens of manuscripts from most of the caves (1, 2, 3, 4, 6, 8, and 11) that she assigns to a single scribe whom she refers to as a "Qumran scribe". Yardeni cautions against claims of scribal hands being as many as 500 and claims that the manuscripts are a cross-section of then-current literature from many distant libraries, deposited in a short time.

Gila Kahila Bar-Gal determined that some of the skin used for the Dead Sea scrolls came from the Nubian ibex, whose range did not include Jerusalem, but includes Mount Hermon and the Golan Heights, the Negev highlands and the western shore of the Dead Sea.

== Archaeological site ==
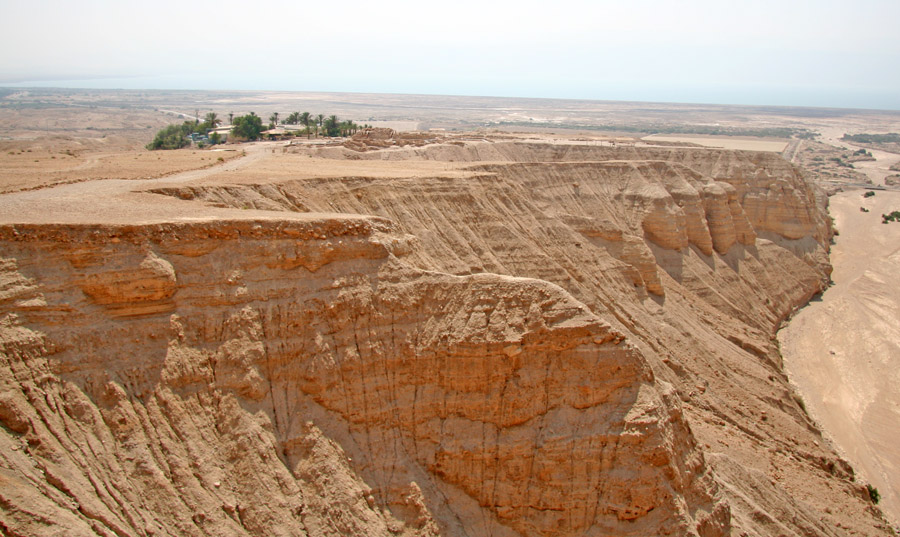
Across the plateau to the settlement.

1. Looking east from the Qumran gorge, the small structure on the upper left amid the trees contains the modern Qumran visitor center. The ruins of Qumran can be seen immediately to the right. The settlement was built close to the seaward side of a plateau. The Dead Sea forms a hazy backdrop. To the extreme right is the Wadi Qumran, a torrent that is dry most of the year. On the few occasions when it rains, though, it becomes a raging torrent that has eroded the side of the plateau where Qumran is. From the mid-left the remains of an aqueduct run down to the settlement. This channel helped furnish Qumran with a valuable supply of water. At the end of the outcrop in the center of the picture is Cave 4, which supplied the vast bulk of the Dead Sea Scrolls.

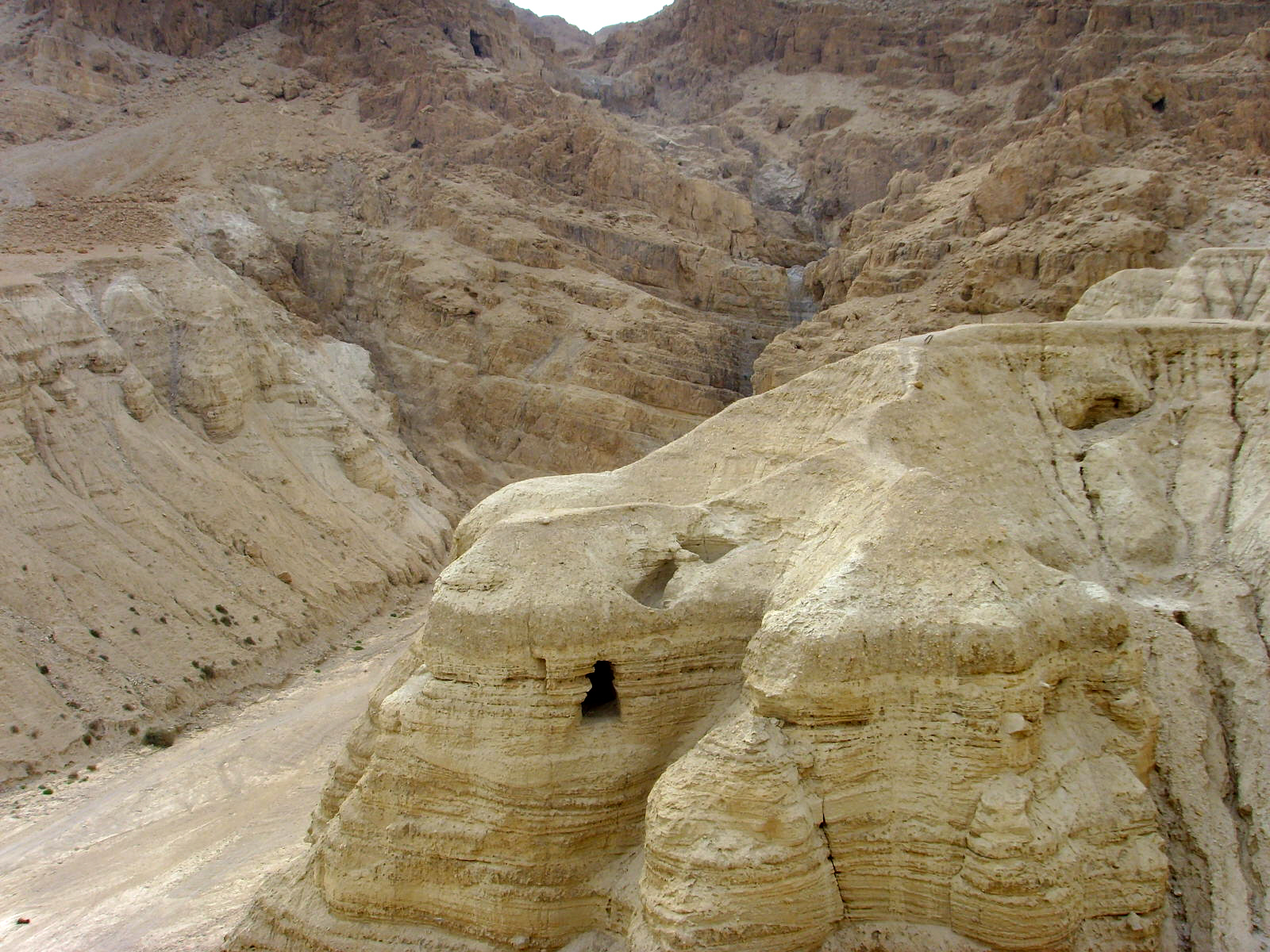
Classic view of Cave 4.

2. This is another view of Wadi Qumran taken from the esplanade abutting the southern side of the Qumran settlement. Cave 4 can clearly be seen. It is an artificial cave cut into the cliff face by humans. Several hundred scrolls were found in the cave. It was found and opened up in the 20th century by a local Bedouin who had been searching for scrolls. Behind the cave on the cliffs the upper course of Wadi Qumran can be seen as it cuts its way down toward the wadi floor.

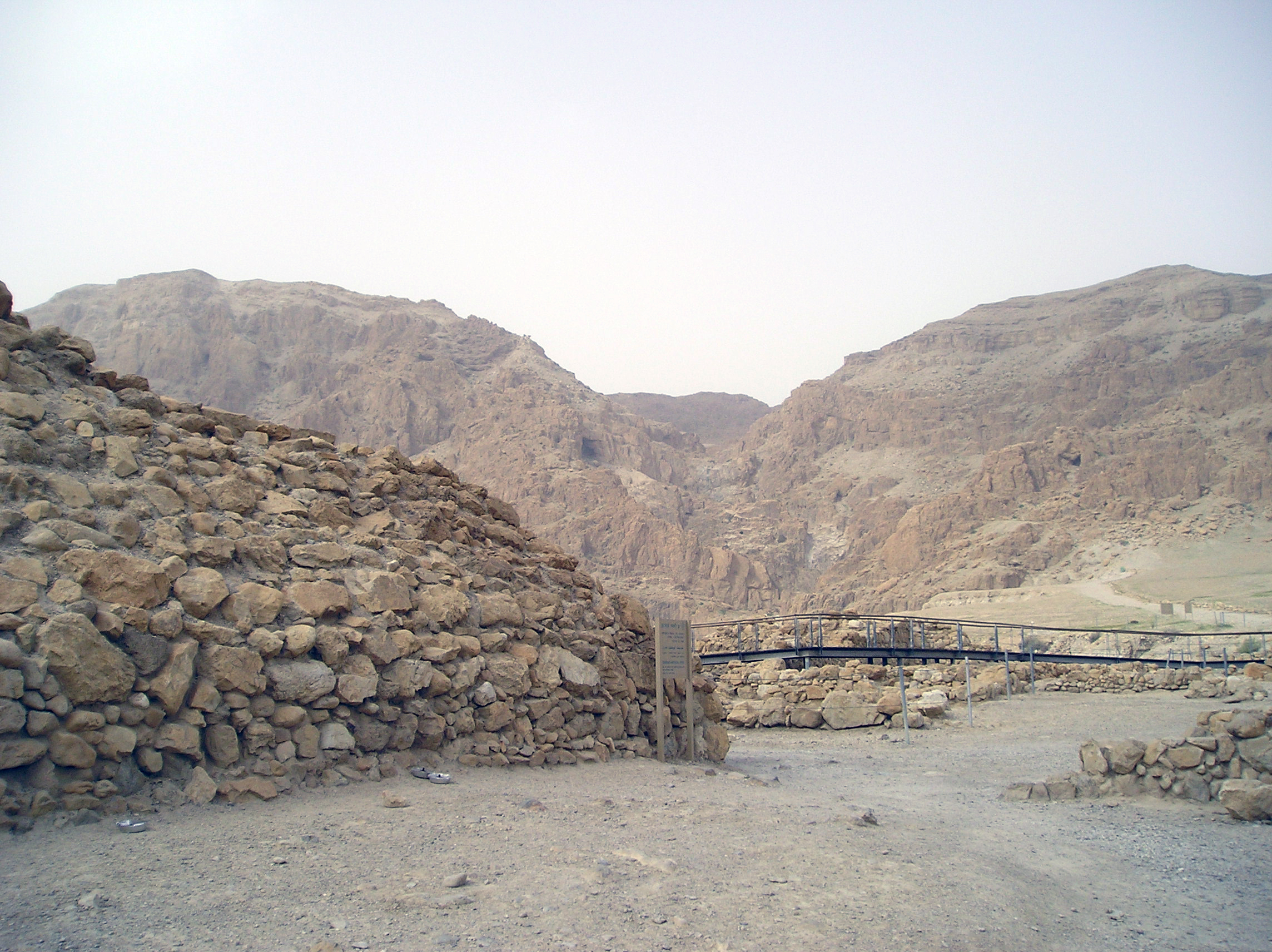
A first view of Qumran.

3. Coming up from the visitor center one comes to the corner of the tower. What we see to the left is mainly the buttressing for the tower. This marks the north-western corner of the main building. Ahead, is a modern walkway that lets visitors to walk through the site and see some of the complexities of the water system. Behind the walkway on the right is the aqueduct that brought rainwater down into the site. The Qumran gorge is in the central distance.

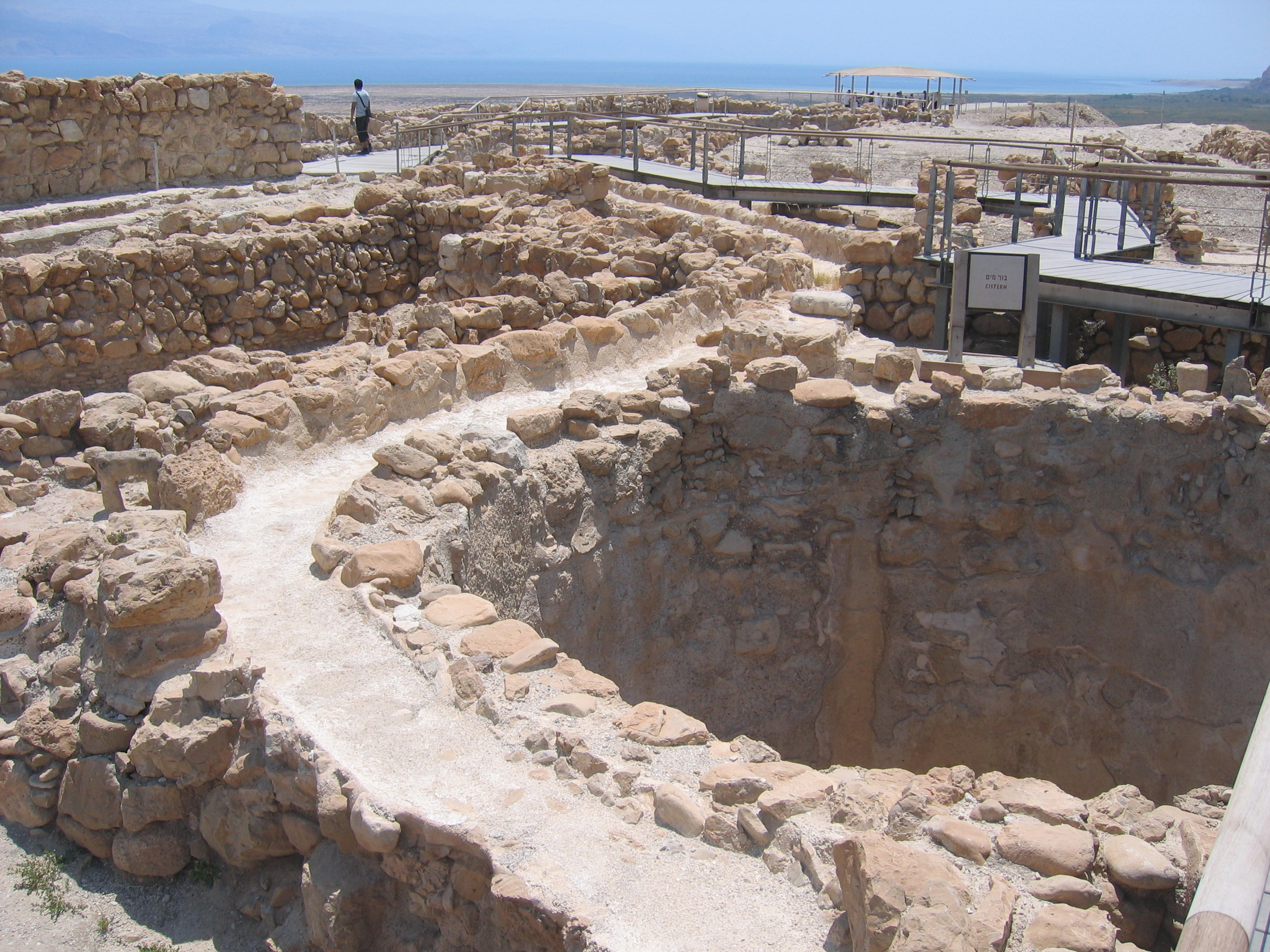
The area between the two buildings.

4. This photo was taken from the walkway. The southern end of the main building can be seen at the top left. The main channel snakes its way through the settlement—here around the round cistern before bending south eastwards. This round cistern was originally constructed during the Iron Age, making it one of the oldest structures at Qumran. Note also the arch cut into the stone on the central left: this fed water down into a stepped cistern (L117) behind it. The canopy in the distance is where photo #2 was taken.

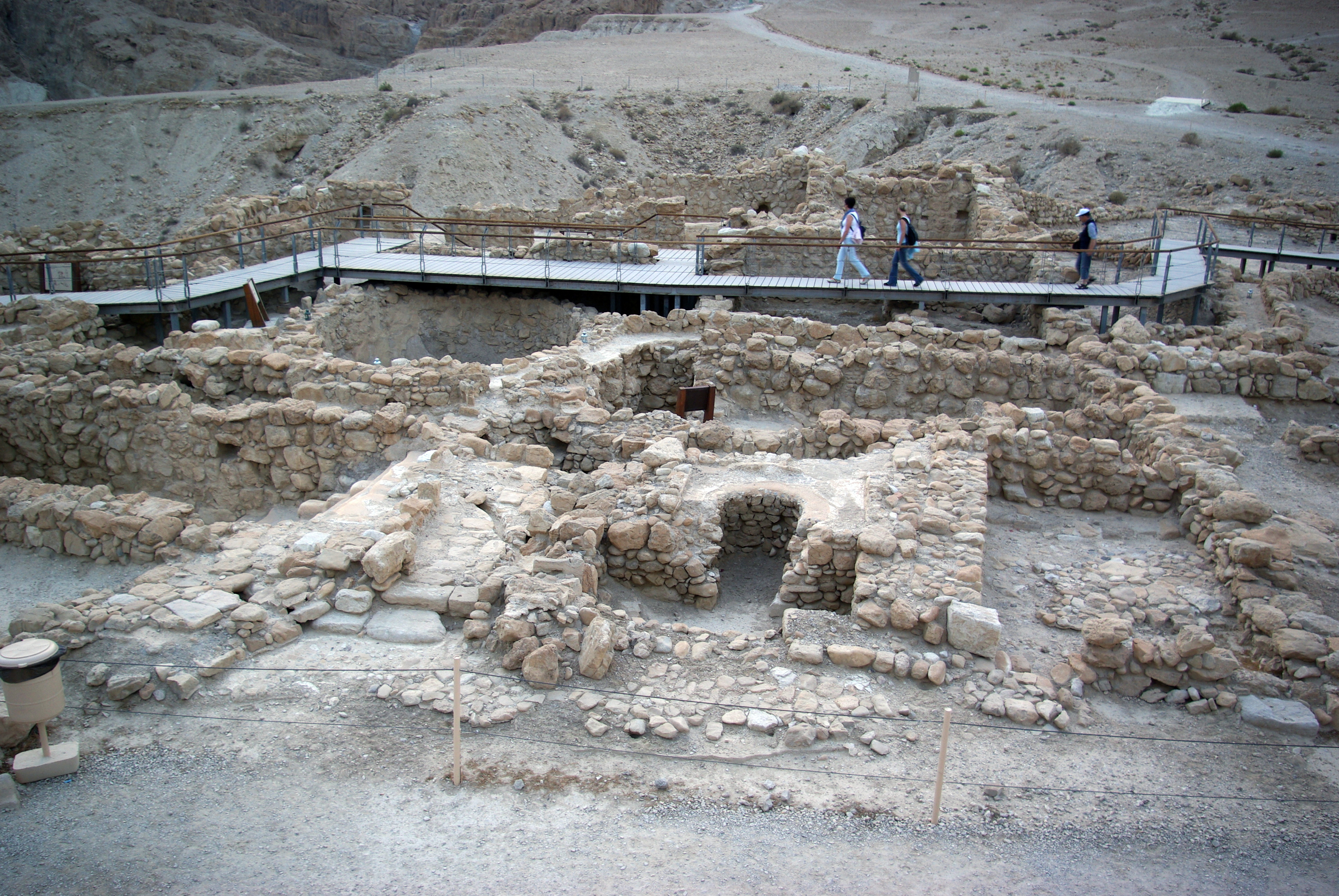
Looking west over the water system toward the cliffs.

5. Looking down from the tower westward is a worker's installation that may have been the bottom of a kiln (or some other structure that was heated from beneath). To its left, a flat area marks the entry point for a stepped cistern (L117), which is farther left. (The steps can just be made out as they descend leftwards.) The main water channel is before the walkway. Behind the walkway are ruins of the western building. Farther behind is the aqueduct that brought rainwater down to the settlement.

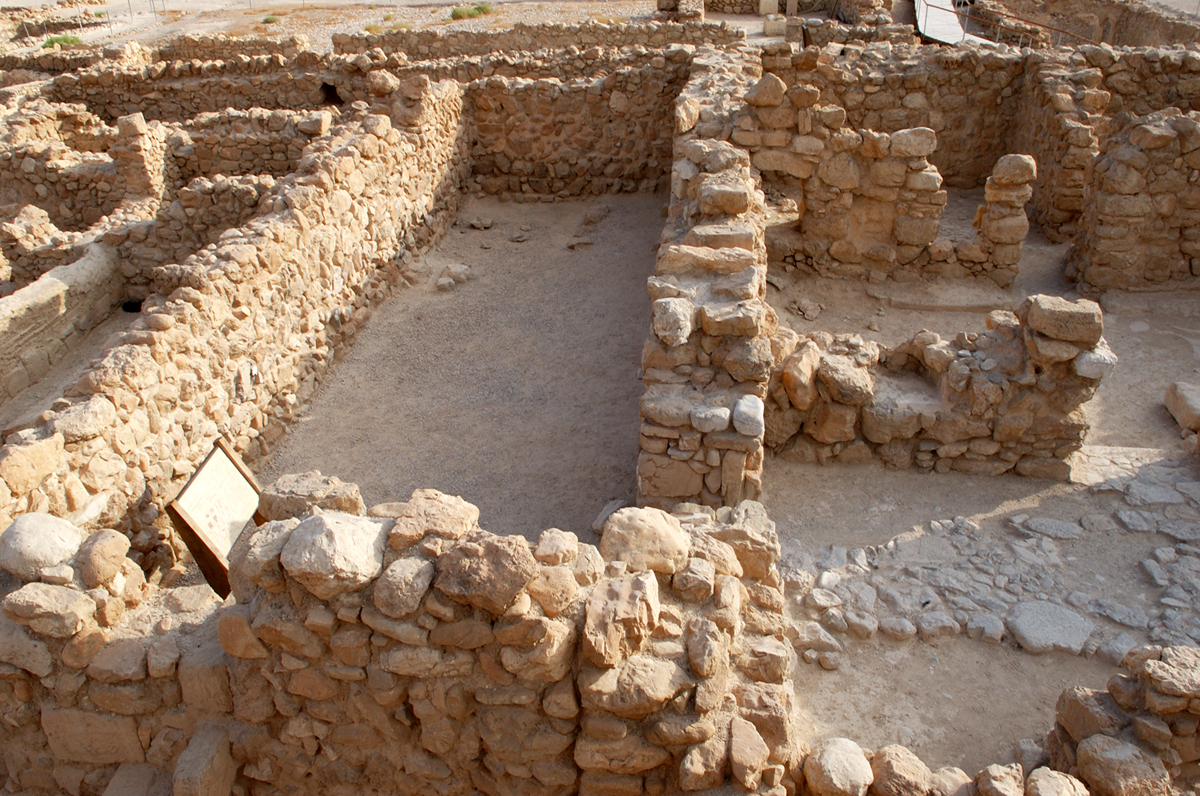
The so-called "scriptorium". (L30)

6. Looking from the tower southward one sees a long narrow room built against the inner wall of the western wing of the main settlement. Here, de Vaux discovered two inkwells and plastered elements he interpreted as benches or tables for writing. The largest surface, upon being reconstructed, measured 5 meters in length, 40 centimeters in breadth and only 50 centimeters in height. These benches (or tables) had fallen through the floor above when the ceiling collapsed. De Vaux referred to this room above as the "scriptorium" and concluded the Dead Sea Scrolls could have been written here, but not all scholars agree with this interpretation. Nearly all scholars, however, conclude that some form of writing took place here on the upper floor of Locus 30. Several ostraca, including a practice alphabet, have been found in and around the site.

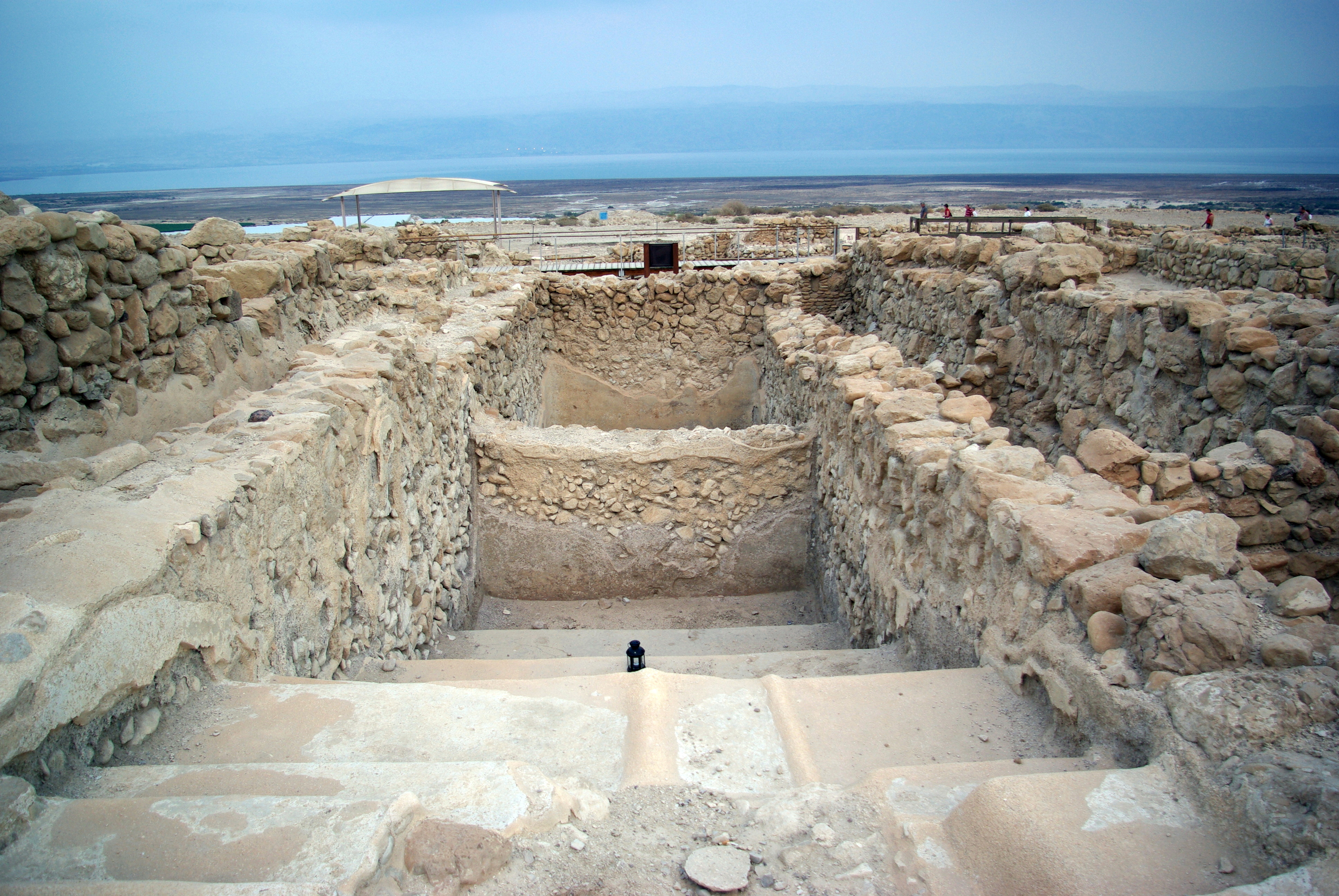
A stepped cistern. (L56/58)

7. Looking east toward the Dead Sea: this stepped pool is located immediately south of the main building but within the main southern wall. It was originally one long pool before an internal wall separated it into two, making the western half (L56) like most other stepped pools on the site. The eastern side (L58) was excavated and a much deeper storage cistern was created. The original pool took fullest advantage of the sloping location, requiring only minimal excavating for the capacity. This pool came into existence some time after the Qumran water system was raised. This raising let water be carried farther, and opened up the possibility for a much bigger storage capacity on the site. The southern end of the main building can be seen to the left. Between it and the wall of the pool, is a channel that carried water to farther stepped pools, L48/49 and L71.

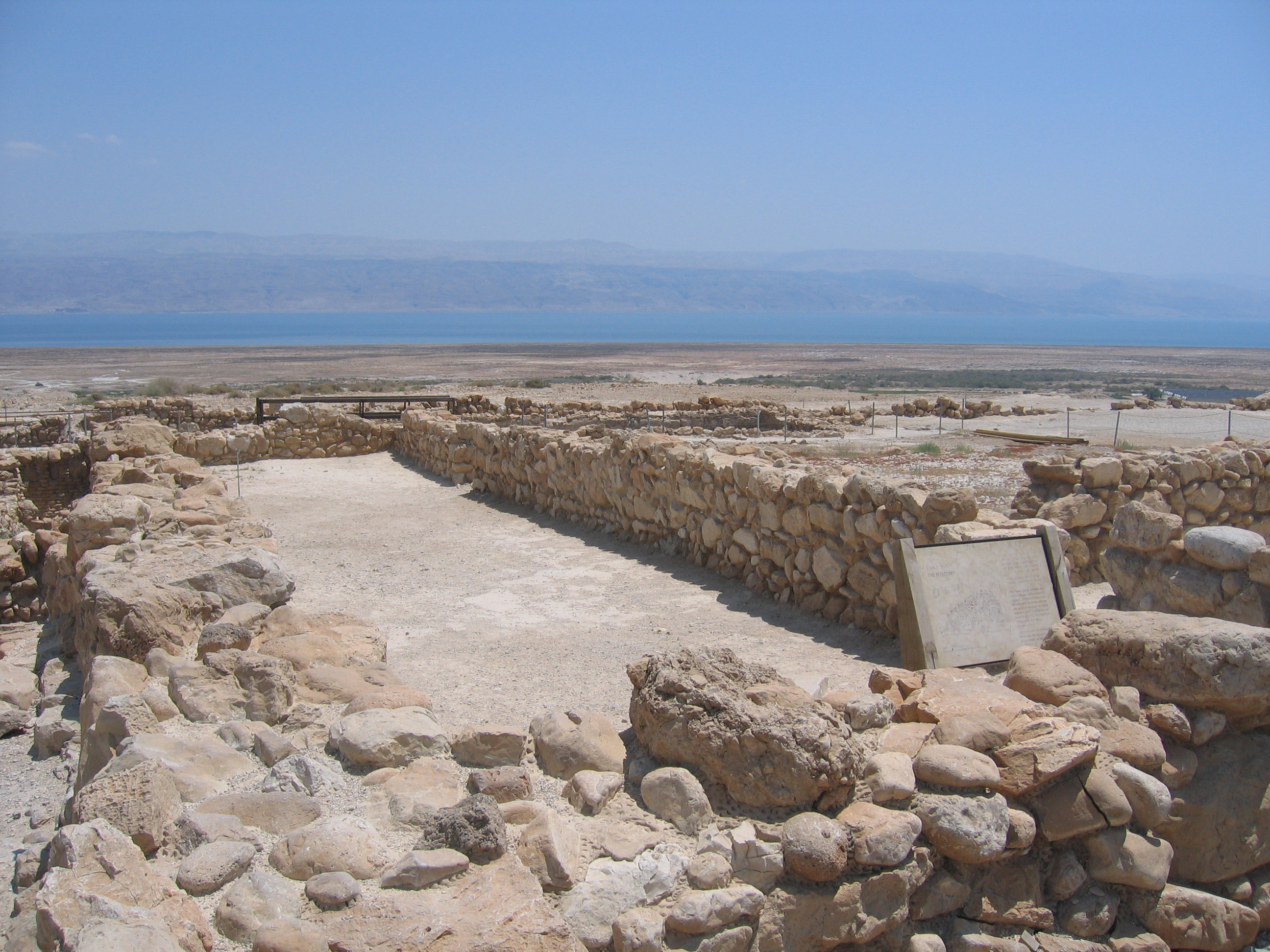
Long room to the south of the main building. (L77)

8. Looking south-east one sees a long narrow room built against the main southern wall of the settlement on the left. (This location is south of #7.) The far end once featured pillars, which gave de Vaux the idea there was a second storey—though no traces were found of such a storey. De Vaux considered this room a refectory, because an adjacent room, commonly referred to as a pantry, contained over a thousand pieces of pottery. This pottery was thought by de Vaux to have been used for communal meals, though some have challenged this interpretation. In fact, the size and layout strongly suggest this was some kind of drying floor for the production of clay from the adjoining evaporation cisterns. That it lines up with the summer solstice supports this theory.

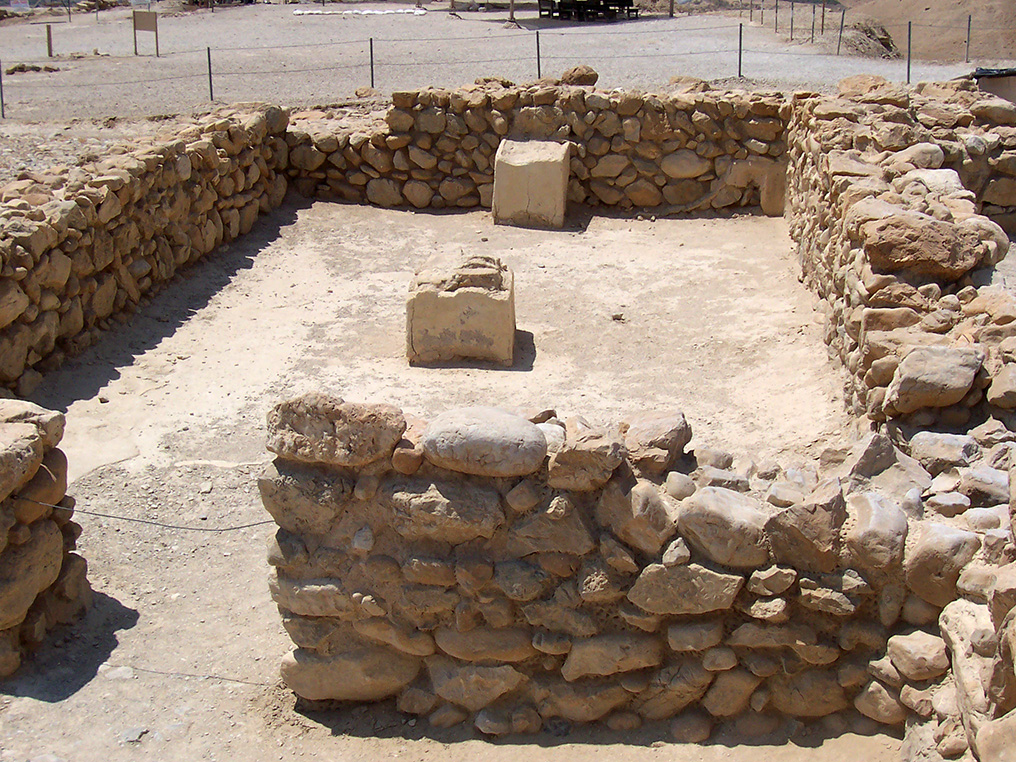
The room with the 1000 ceramic items. (L86/89)

9. To the right (south) of #8. This location is commonly known as the "pantry". At the southern end of this room 708 bowls, 204 plates, 75 goblets, 37 terrines, 21 jars, 11 jugs, and other ceramic items were found by de Vaux, mostly neatly stacked. De Vaux believed that this crockery was used for meals in L.77, which he referred to as the "refectory". The southern end of the room had been walled off. The effects of an earthquake may be indicated by the fact that this wall later collapsed over the pottery, crushing it, and that the southern walls had to be strengthened externally. During the last period at Qumran, a water channel was rerouted to pass immediately south of the northern wall. Then, following the outer wall of L.77, it eventually supplied the large cistern (L.71). Another interesting find from the location was a bowl inscribed with the name "Eleazar". Note the remains of two pilasters. Their purpose is unknown, but they do not seem to have been load-bearing.

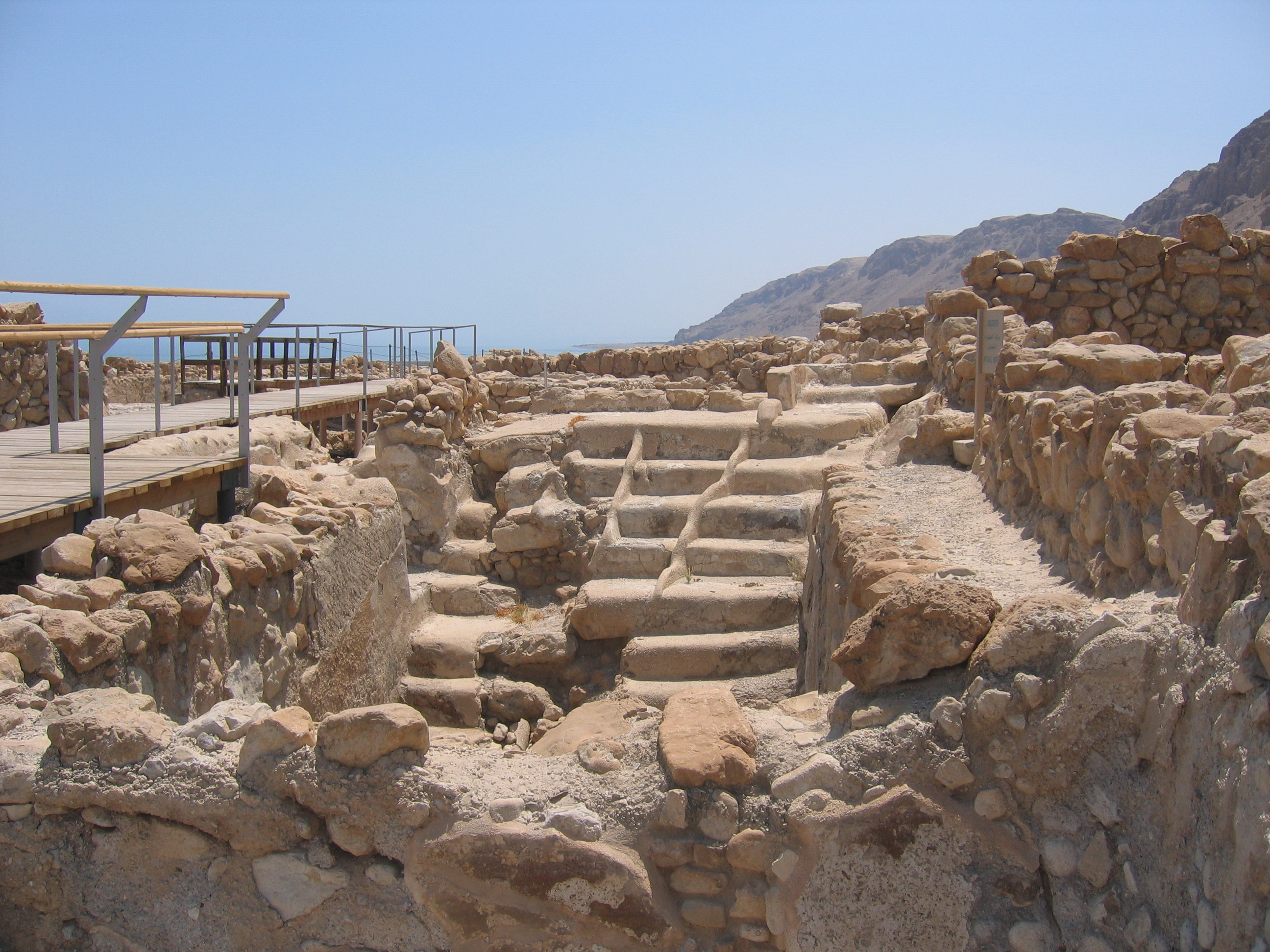
The broken cistern. (L48/49)

10. One of the most interesting discoveries at Qumran was the unearthing on the eastern side of the main building of this stepped cistern featuring a crack down the steps marking where the land dropped, apparently due to an earthquake. A channel farther to the south fed the largest of the Qumran cisterns, which was broken at the same time by the same means. As that cistern was used in a late phase of the site, we can surmise that the cistern we see was also damaged then. Also of interest are the dividers that run down the steps. Some scholars have suggested that these served as partitions separating those entering the pool from those exiting, similar to miqva'ot (Jewish ritual baths) found near Jerusalem, but not all scholars accept this interpretation. (Katharina Galor, who carried out the most complete analysis thus far of the Qumran water system, commented, "[f]rom a practical point of view, the interpretation of using the low divisions as a symbolic space divider does not make any sense".) The partitions may have served to aid in channeling water into the pool.

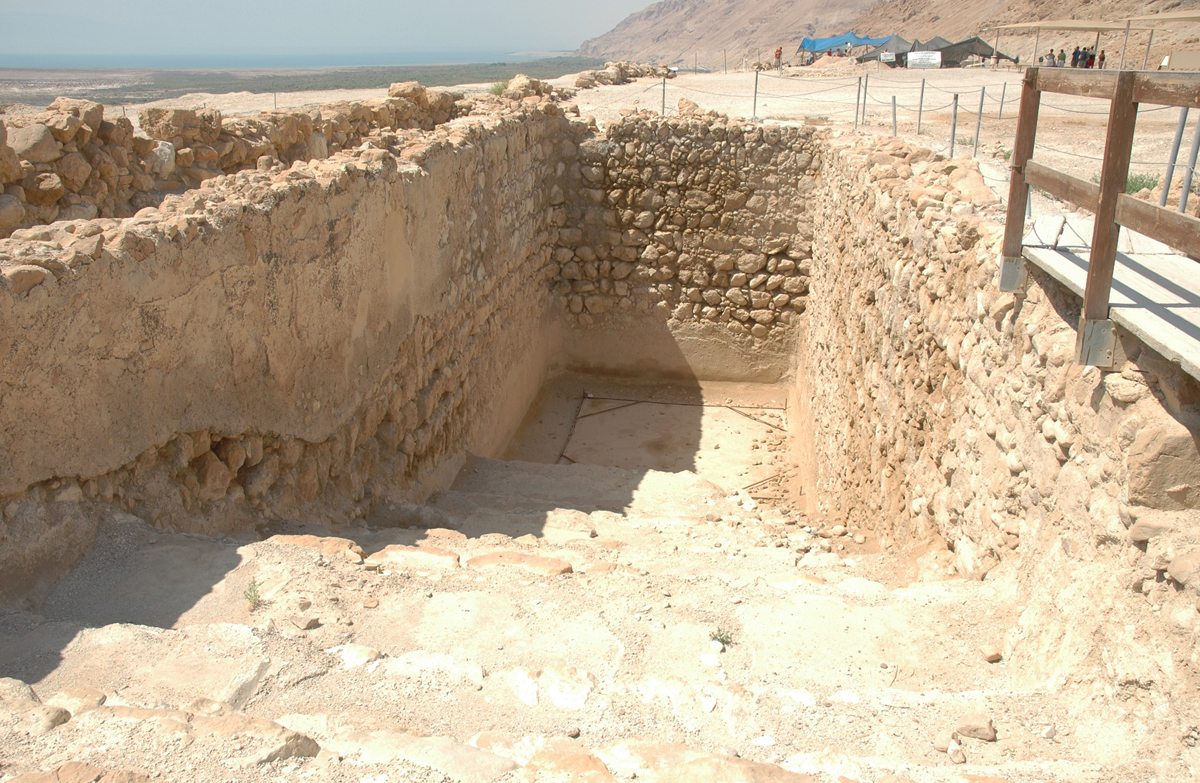
The Locus 71 pool.

11. Looking south one sees a long narrow pool dug into the southeast corner of the settlement. This is the last and largest pool in the water system at Qumran. This enormous structure could hold 300 cubic meters of water, more than all the other stepped pools combined. During Period III, (i.e., after the Jewish War), a water channel was partially rerouted to remedy prior destruction and continue to fill this pool. Scholars debate whether it was a miqvah (Jewish ritual bath), a cistern, or a clay collection vat.

== Criticism ==
Some writers have claimed that Israel has invested heavily in the area to establish the Qumran caves as a site of "uniquely Israeli Jewish heritage".

== See also ==
- Ancient Qumran: A Virtual Reality Tour
- Qumran calendrical texts

== Bibliography ==
- Bar-Adon, Pessah, "The Hasmonean Fortresses and the Status of Khirbet Qumran", Eretz Israel 15 (1981): 349–352.
- Bar-Nathan, Rachel, "Qumran and the Hasmonaean and Herodian Winter Palaces of Jericho", in The Site of the Dead Sea Scrolls: Archaeological Interpretations and Debates, (Studies on the Texts of the Desert of Judah, Vol. 57), ed. by Katharina Galor, Jean-Baptiste Humbert, and Jurgen Zangenberg, (Leiden: Brill, 2006), 263–277.
- Boccaccini, Gabriele, Beyond the Essene Hypothesis: The Parting of Ways between Qumran and Enochic Judaism (Grand Rapids: Eerdmans, 1998).
- Broshi, Magen, "The Archaeology of Qumran: A Reconsideration", in The Dead Sea Scrolls: Forty Years of Research, D. Diamant & U. Rappaport (eds.) (Brill-Magnes Press, 1992), 113–115.
- Broshi, Magen, and Eshel, Hanan, "Residential Caves at Qumran." Dead Sea Discoveries 6 (1999), 328–348.
- Broshi, Magen, and Eshel, Hanan, "Was There Agriculture at Qumran?" in The Site of the Dead Sea Scrolls: Archaeological Interpretations and Debates, (Studies on the Texts of the Desert of Judah, Vol. 57), ed. by Katharina Galor, Jean-Baptiste Humbert, and Jurgen Zangenberg, (Leiden: Brill, 2006).
- Cansdale, Lena, & Crown, Alan, "Qumran, Was It an Essene Settlement?", Biblical Archaeology Review 20/5 (1995) 24–35, 73–78.
- Cansdale, Lena, The Metamorphosis of the Name "Qumran", in The Dead Sea Scrolls: Fifty Years After Their Discovery, 1947–1997, Schiffman, Lawrence, Tov, Emanuel, & VanderKam, James, (eds.), (Jerusalem: IES, 2000), pp. 631–636.
- Cargill, Robert R., Qumran through (Real) Time: A Virtual Reconstruction of Qumran and the Dead Sea Scrolls, Bible in Technology 1, (Piscataway, New Jersey: Gorgias Press, 2009).
- Cargill, Robert R., "The Qumran Digital Model: An Argument for Archaeological Reconstruction in Virtual Reality and Response to Jodi Magness", Near Eastern Archaeology 72/1 (2009): 28–47.
- Cook, Edward M., "Qumran: A Ritual Purification Center", Biblical Archaeology Review 22/6 (1996): 39, 48–51, 73–75.
- Crowfoot, Grace Mary, "The Linen Textiles." pp. 18–40 in Discoveries in the Judean Desert I: Qumran Cave I. Edited by Dominique Barthélemy and Joseph Tadeusz Milik (Oxford: Clarendon Press, 1956).
- Crown, A.D. and Cansdale, L., "Qumran-Was It an Essene Settlement?" Biblical Archaeology Review 20 (1994), 24–35, 73–4, 76–78.
- de Vaux, Roland, Archaeology and the Dead Sea Scrolls (Oxford: Oxford University Press, 1973). English translation from the French.
- Dávid, Nóra, Armin Lange, Kristin De Troyer and Shani Tzoref (eds). The Hebrew Bible in Light of the Dead Sea Scrolls (Göttingen, Vandenhoeck & Ruprecht, 2011) (Forschungen zur Religion und Literatur des Alten und Neuen Testaments, 239).
- Davies, Philip R., Qumran, Cities of the Biblical World (Grand Rapids: Eerdmans, 1982).
- Dombrowski, B.W.W., "Golb's Hypothesis: Analysis and Conclusions." In Mogilany 1995: Papers on the Dead Sea Scrolls Offered in Memory of Aleksy Klawek ed. Zdzislaw Jan Kapera; QM 15; Kraków: Enigma, 1998) 35–54.
- Donceel, R. and Donceel-Voûte, Pauline H.E., "The Archaeology of Khirbet Qumran." In Methods of Investigation of the Dead Sea Scrolls and the Khirbet Qumran Site: Present Realities and Future Prospects ed. Michael O. Wise, Norman Golb, John J. Collins, and Dennis G. Pardee; Annals of the New York Academy of Sciences 722 (New York: New York Academy of Sciences, 1994) 1–38.
- Donceel-Voûte, Pauline H. E. "Les ruines de Qumran réinterprétées." Archeologia 298 (1994) 24–35.
- Donceel-Voûte, Pauline H.E. "'Coenaculum': La salle à l’étage du locus 30 à Khirbet Qumrân sur la Mer Morte." In Banquets d'Orient (ed. R. Gyselen, with M. Bernus-Taylor et al.; ResO 4; Leuven: Peeters, 1992) 61–84.
- Eshel, Hanan, Qumran: A Field Guide. (Jerusalem: Carta, 2009).
- Fields, Weston W. The Dead Sea Scrolls: A Full History. volume 1 (Leiden: Brill, 2009).
- Frey, Jörg, Carsten Claußen u. Nadine Kessler (Hrsg.), Qumran und die Archäologie. Texte und Kontexte (Tübingen, Mohr Siebeck, 2011) (Wissenschaftliche Untersuchungen zum Neuen Testament (WUNT I), 278).
- Galor, Katharina, "Plastered Pools: A New Perspective", in Khirbet Qumran et Ain Feshkha, Vol. II., ed. Humbert, Jean-Baptiste & Gunneweg, Jan, (Vandenhoeck & Ruprecht Goettingen, 2003) 291–320.
- Galor, Katharina, Humbert, Jean-Baptiste, and Zangenberg, Jurgen, The Site of the Dead Sea Scrolls: Archaeological Interpretations and Debates, (Studies on the Texts of the Desert of Judah, Vol. 57), (Leiden: Brill, 2006).
- Gibson, Shimon, and Joan E. Taylor, "Roads and Passes Round Qumran." Palestine Exploration Quarterly 140/3 (2008) 225–227.
- Golb, Norman, "Khirbet Qumran and the Manuscript Finds of the Judaean Wilderness." In Methods of Investigation of the Dead Sea Scrolls and the Khirbet Qumran Site: Present Realities and Future Prospects (ed. Michael O. Wise, Norman Golb, John J. Collins, and Dennis G. Pardee; ANYAS 722; New York: New York Academy of Sciences, 1994) 51–72.
- Golb, Norman, Who Wrote the Dead Sea Scrolls?: The Search for the Secret of Qumran. (New York: Scribner, 1995).
- Goranson, Stephen. "Review: Katharina Galor, Jean-Baptiste Humbert, and Jürgen Zangenberg, eds., The Site of the Dead Sea Scrolls: Archaeological Interpretations and Debates. Proceedings of a Conference Held at Brown University, November 17–19, 2002." Bulletin of the American Schools of Oriental Research 347 (2007) 114–116.
- Gunneweg, J. and Balla, M., "How Neutron Activation Analysis Can Assist Research into the Provenance of the Pottery at Qumran." In Historical Perspectives: From the Hasmoneans to Bar Kokhba in Light of the Dead Sea Scrolls. Proceedings of the Fourth International Symposium of the Orion Center for the Study of the Dead Sea Scrolls and Associated Literature, 27–31 January 1999, eds. D. Goodblatt, A. Pinnick, and D. R. Schwartz, 179–185. STDJ 37. (Leiden: Brill, 2001).
- Hempel, Ch., "Qumran: Archaeology." Encyclopedia of the Dead Sea Scrolls, 2 vols. (ed. Lawrence H. Schiffman and James C. VanderKam; (New York: Oxford University Press, 2000) II. 746–751.
- Hirschfeld, Yizhar, "The Architextural Context of Qumran", in The Dead Sea Scrolls, fifty years after their discovery 1947–1997 (L. H. Schiffman, E. Tov and J. VanderKam, eds.) (Jerusalem: Israel Exploration Society and the Shrine of the Book, Israel Museum, 2000), 673–683.
- Hirschfeld, Yizhar, "Qumran in the Second Temple Period: A Reassessment", in The Site of the Dead Sea Scrolls: Archaeological Interpretations and Debates, (Studies on the Texts of the Desert of Judah, Vol. 57), ed. by Katharina Galor, Jean-Baptiste Humbert, and Jurgen Zangenberg, (Leiden: Brill, 2006).
- Hirschfeld, Yizhar, Qumran in Context: Reassessing the Archaeological Evidence, (Peabody, Massachusetts: Hendrickson, 2004).
- Humbert, Jean-Baptiste, "L'espace sacré à Qumrân." Revue Biblique (1994) 101–102, 161–214.
- Humbert, Jean-Baptiste, "Les différentes interprétations du site de Qumran." Monde de la Bible, 107 (1997), 20–25.
- Humbert, Jean-Baptiste, "Some Remarks on the Archaeology of Qumran", in The Site of the Dead Sea Scrolls: Archaeological Interpretations and Debates, (Studies on the Texts of the Desert of Judah, Vol. 57), ed. by Katharina Galor, Jean-Baptiste Humbert, and Jurgen Zangenberg (Leiden: Brill, 2006).
- Humbert, Jean-Baptiste, "Reconsideration of the Archaeological Interpretation", in Khirbet Qumran et Ain Feshkha, Vol. II. ed. Humbert, Jean-Baptiste & Gunneweg, Jan, (Vandenhoeck & Ruprecht Goettingen, 2003) 419–425.
- Humbert, Jean-Baptiste & Chambon, Alain, Fouilles de Khirbet Qumran et de Ain Feshka, Vol. I. Editions Universitaires Fribourg Suisse (Vandenhoeck & Ruprecht Goettingen, 1994).
- Humbert, Jean-Baptiste & Chambon, Alain, The Excavations of Khirbet Qumran and Ain Feshkha, Vol. 1B. trans by Stephen J. Pfann, Editions Universitaires Fribourg Suisse (Vandenhoeck & Ruprecht Goettingen, 2003).
- Humbert, Jean-Baptiste & Gunneweg, Jan, Khirbet Qumran et Ain Feshkha: études d'anthropologie, de physique et de chimie = studies of anthropology, physics and chemistry, Vol. II. Editions Universitaires Fribourg Suisse (Vandenhoeck & Ruprecht Goettingen, 2003).
- Hutchesson, Ian, "63 BCE: A Revised Dating for the Depositation of the Dead Sea Scrolls", Qumran Chronicle 8/3 (1999): 177–194.
- Kapera, Z. J., "How Many Tombs in Qumran?", The Qumran Chronicle 9.1 (August 2000), 35–49.
- Lemaire, Andre, "Inscriptions du Khirbeh, des Grottes et de 'Ain Feshkha", in Khirbet Qumran et Ain Feshkha, Vol. II., ed. Humbert, Jean-Baptiste & Gunneweg, Jan, (Vandenhoeck & Ruprecht Goettingen, 2003) 341–388.
- Lönnqvist, M. and Lönnqvist, K. (2002) Archaeology of the Hidden Qumran, The New Paradigm, Helsinki: Helsinki University Press.
- Lönnqvist, K. and Lönnqvist, M. (2006) 'The Numismatic Chronology of Qumran: Fact and Fiction', The Numismatic Chronicle 166, London: The Royal Numismatic Society, pp. 121–165.
- Lönnqvist, K. (2007). The report of the Amman lots of the Qumran silver coin hoards. New Chronological Aspects of the Silver Coin Hoard Evidence from Khirbet Qumran at the Dead Sea. Amman 2007, pp. 1–72.
- Lönnqvist, K. A. K. (2008) New Perspectives on the Roman Coinage on the Eastern Limes in the Late Republican and Roman Imperial Periods. VDM Verlag Dr. Müller. Saarbrücken 2009.
- Magen, Yitzhak, and Peleg, Yuval, "Back to Qumran: Ten Years of Excavations and Research, 1993–2004", in The Site of the Dead Sea Scrolls: Archaeological Interpretations and Debates, (Studies on the Texts of the Desert of Judah, Vol. 57), ed. by Katharina Galor, Jean-Baptiste Humbert, and Jurgen Zangenberg, (Leiden: Brill, 2006).
- Magen, Yitzhak & Peleg, Yuval, "The Qumran Excavations 1993–2004: Preliminary Report", JSP 6 (Jerusalem: Israel Antiquities Authority, 2007) Download
- Magness, Jodi, "Qumran Archaeology: Past Perspectives and Future Prospects." In The Dead Sea Scrolls after Fifty Years: A Comprehensive Reassessment, vol. 1, ed. Peter W. Flint and James C.VanderKam; (Leiden: E. J. Brill, 1998) pp. 47–77, 708–719.
- Magness, Jodi, "A Reassessment of the Excavations of Qumran." In The Dead Sea Scrolls: Fifty Years After Their Discovery, 1947–1997, Schiffman, Lawrence, Tov, Emanuel, & VanderKam, James, (eds.), (Jerusalem: IES, 2000), pp. 708–719.
- Magness, Jodi, The Archaeology of Qumran and the Dead Sea Scrolls (Grand Rapids: Eerdmans, 2002).
- Magness, Jodi (2021). The Archaeology of Qumran and the Dead Sea Scrolls (2nd ed.). Wm. B. Eerdmans Publishing. ISBN 978-1-4674-6241-9.
- Meyers, Eric. "Khirbet Qumran and its Environs", in The Oxford Handbook of the Dead Sea Scrolls, ed. Timothy H Lim and John Joseph Collins (Oxford : Oxford University Press, 2010).
- Milik, J. T., Ten Years in the Wilderness of Judaea, (Translated by J. Strugnell; London: SCM, 1959).
- Misgav, Haggai, "The Ostraca", in Back to Qumran: Final Report (1993–2004), (2018), pp. 431–441.
- Murphy, Catherine M., Wealth in the Dead Sea Scrolls and the Qumran Community, (Leiden: Brill 2002).
- Netzer, Ehud. "Did any perfume industry exist at 'Ein Feshkha?", Israel Exploration Journal 55 no. 1 2005, pp. 97–100.
- Patrich, Joseph, "Khirbet Qumran in the Light of New Archaeological Explorations in the Qumran Caves", in Methods of Investigation of the Dead Sea Scrolls and the Khirbet Qumran Site: Present Realities and Future Prospects (ed. Michael O. Wise, Norman Golb, John J. Collins, and Dennis G. Pardee; Annals of the New York Academy of Sciences 722 (New York: New York Academy of Sciences, 1994) 73–95.
- Patrich, Joseph, "Did Extra-Mural Dwelling Quarters Exist at Qumran?" in The Dead Sea Scrolls: Fifty Years After Their Discovery. Edited by Lawrence H. Schiffman, Emanuel Tov, James C. VanderKam, and Galen Marquis (Jerusalem: Israel Exploration Society, 2000) 720–727.
- Puech, Émile, "The Necropolises of Khirbet Qumrân and 'Ain el-Ghuweir and the Essene Belief in the Afterlife", Bulletin of the American Schools of Oriental Research 312 (1998) 21–36.
- Rabin, Ira, Oliver Hahn, Timo Wolff, Admir Masic, and Gisela Weinberg. "On the Origin of the Ink of the Thanksgiving Scroll (1QHodayota)." Dead Sea Discoveries 16/1 (2009) 97–106.
- Reed, William L., "The Qumran Caves Expedition of March, 1952", Bulletin of the American Schools of Oriental Research 135 (1954) 8–13.
- Regev, Eyal, "Access Analysis of Khirbet Qumran: Reading Spatial Organization and Social Boundaries", Bulletin of the American Schools of Oriental Research 355 (2009) 85–99.
- Reich, Ronny, "Miqwa'ot at Khirbet Qumran and the Jerusalem Connection." pp. 728–731 in The Dead Sea Scrolls: Fifty Years After Their Discovery. Edited by Lawrence H. Schiffman, Emanuel Tov, James C. VanderKam, and Galen Marquis (Jerusalem: Israel Exploration Society, 2000).
- Rengstorf, Karl Heinrich, Hirbet Qumrân and the Problem of the Library of the Dead Sea Caves, Translated by J. R. Wilkie (Leiden: Brill, 1963).
- Ricklin, Shimon, "When Did the Essenes Arrive at Qumran? – An Architectural Response." pp. 263–266 in Studies in the Settlement of Judea: A Collection of Papers in Historical Geography. Edited by Ze’ev H. Erlich (Beni Brak: Moriah, 1995).
- Schiffman, Lawrence H., Sectarian Law in the Dead Sea Scrolls: Courts, Testimony and the Penal Code, Brown Judaic Studies 33 (Chico, CA: Scholars Press, 1983).
- Schiffman, Lawrence H., The Eschatological Community of the Dead Sea Scrolls, (Atlanta: Scholars Press, 1989).
- Schiffman, Lawrence H., Tov, Emanuel, & VanderKam, James, eds. The Dead Sea Scrolls: Fifty Years After Their Discovery, 1947–1997, (Jerusalem: IES, 2000).
- Schiffman, Lawrence H., From Text to Tradition: A History of Second Temple and Rabbinic Judaism, (NYC: Ktav Pub. House, 1991).
- Schultz, Brian, "The Qumran Cemetery: 150 Years of Research." Dead Sea Discoveries 13 (2006): 194–228.
- Steckoll, S.H., "An Inkwell from Qumran", Mada 13 (1969), 260–261 (in Hebrew).
- Taylor, Joan E., "The Cemeteries of Khirbet Qumran and Women's Presence at the Site", Dead Sea Discoveries 6 (1999): 625–323.
- Taylor, Joan E., "Khirbet Qumran in the Nineteenth Century and the Name of the Site." Palestine Exploration Quarterly 134 (2002) 144–164.
- Trever, John C., The Untold Story of Qumran, (Westwood: Fleming H. Revell Company, 1965).
- Wise, Michael O., Golb, Norman, Collins, John J., and Pardee, Dennis G., Methods of Investigation of the Dead Sea Scrolls and the Khirbet Qumran Site: Present Realities and Future Prospects, Annals of the New York Academy of Sciences 722 (New York: New York Academy of Sciences, 1994)
- Yellin, J., Broshi, M. and Eshel, H., "Pottery of Qumran and Ein Ghuweir: The First Chemical Exploration of Provenience", Bulletin of the American Schools of Oriental Research 321 (2001) pp. 65–78,
- La Biblioteca di Qumran primo volume, Torah-Genesi, edizione italiana a cura di Giovanni Ibba, EDB, 2013.
