= André Lemaire =

French historian

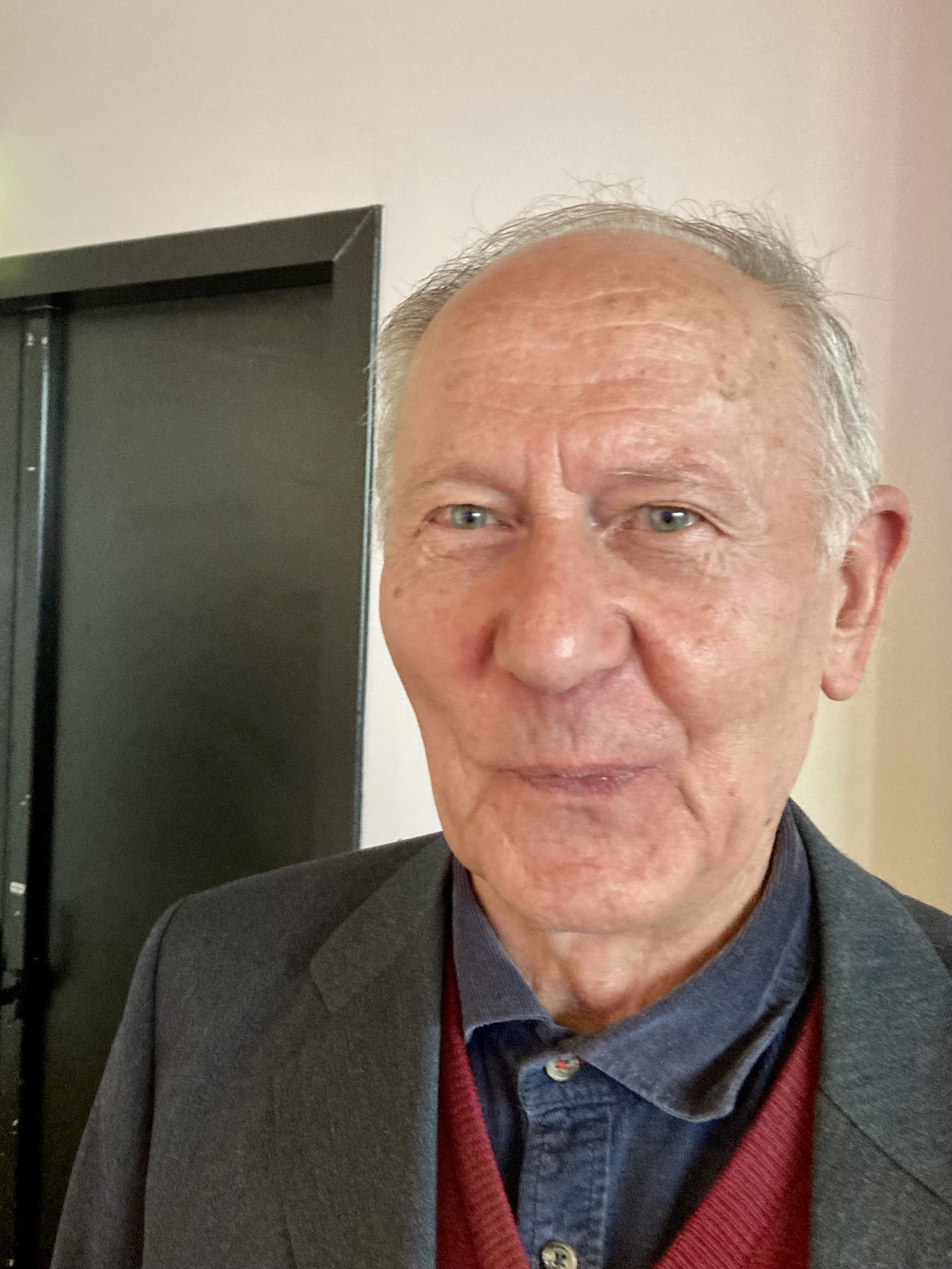
André Lemaire

André Lemaire (born 1942) is a French epigrapher, historian and philologist. He is Director of Studies at the École pratique des hautes études, where he teaches Hebraic and Aramean philology and epigraphy. He specializes in West-Semitic old civilization and the origins of monotheism. He is a corresponding member of the Académie des Inscriptions et Belles-Lettres.

He heads the scientific edition of the international series Supplements to Vetus Testamentum (more than 30 volumes).

== King Solomon's Temple ==
In the 1980s, Lemaire authenticated a small, broken, carved piece of "ivory pomegranate" that dates to the 8th century and would have belonged to the cult objects of Solomon's Temple. This is according to his analysis of the inscription examined with the methods of epigraphy.

This interpretation was challenged by Yuval Goren of Tel Aviv University, who stated that the inscription is subsequent to damage that had fragmented the piece.

Following this, a commission of experts from the Israel Museum examined the artifact and concluded that the inscription is a modern forgery, and that the item dates back to the 14th or the 13th century BCE, well before the time of Solomon.

== "House of David" ==
Based on contemporary digital imaging techniques of the Mesha Stele, Lemaire and colleague Jean-Phillipe Delorme argued in 2022 that five key letters found in line 31 of the inscription can accurately be read as btdwd, or "House of David", offering archaeological evidence of the existence and history of the Kingdom of Judah, its political identity, and the extent of its political hegemony.

== Publications ==
- 1971: Les Ministères aux origines de l'Église : Naissance de la triple hiérarchie, évêques, presbytes, diacres, Éditions du Cerf
- 1974: Les Ministères dans l'Église, Éditions du Centurion
- 1994: La Palestine à l'époque perse (with Ernest-Marie Laperrousaz), Éditions du Cerf
- 1999: Le Monde de la Bible, Les Arènes
- 2001: Histoire du peuple hébreu, Que sais-je?, 6th ed.
- 2001: Prophètes et rois : Bible et Proche-Orient (dir.), Éditions du Cerf
- 2002: Le Proche-Orient asiatique, volume 2 (with Paul Garelli), PUF
- 2003: La Naissance du monothéisme : Point de vue d'un historien, Bayard presse

== See also ==
- James Ossuary
- Abrahamic religions
- Yahweh
- Tel Dan Stele
- James, brother of Jesus
