= Albert Augustus Isaacs =

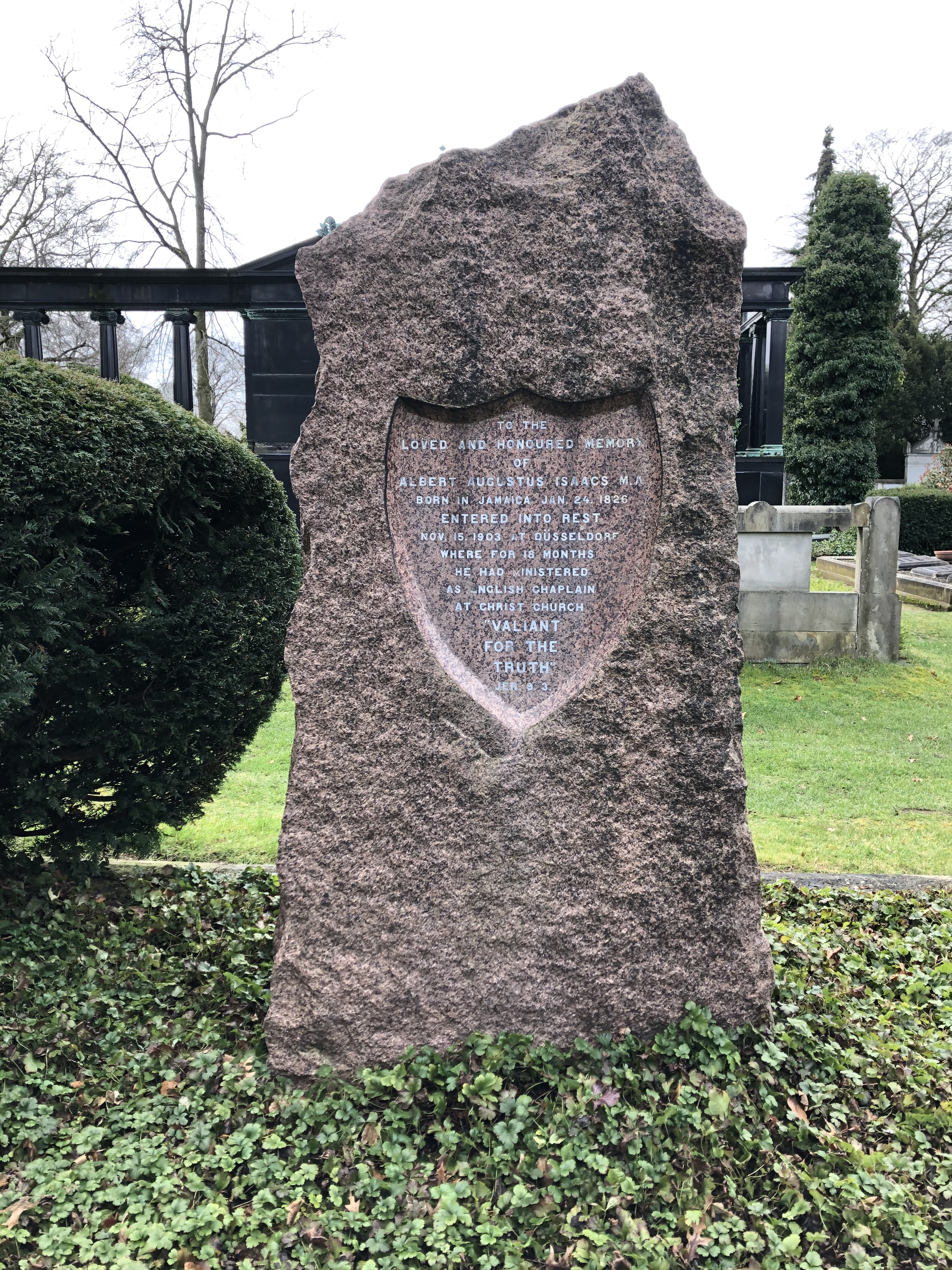
Memory to Albert August Isaacs in Düsseldorf

Rev. Albert Augustus Isaacs (24 January 1826 – 15 November 1903) was a British clergyman, historian and anthropologist, specialising in the history of the Jews and Arabs in the Middle East, as well as an amateur photographer who took some of the earliest images of the Holy Land. Of major note is his biography of the Reverend Henry Aaron Stern (1820–1885), published in 1886, who for more than forty years was a missionary amongst the Jews. The book contains an account of his labours and travels in Mesopotamia, Persia, Arabia, Turkey, Abyssinia, and England.

He was born in Berry Hill, Jamaica, to Isaac and Henrietta Isaacs. He was baptised into the Church of England in Manchester, Jamaica. He was educated at Corpus Christi College, Cambridge, earning his BA in 1851 and MA in 1854, followed by admission ad eundem to Christ Church, Oxford, where he taught. He worked as a priest in Peterborough, 1850–66, and was the vicar of Christ Church, Leicester, 1866–91.

In the winter of 1856–1857, he made an extensive journey to Palestine and published a book about The Dead Sea entitled The Dead Sea, Or, Notes and Observations Made During a Journey to Palestine in 1856-7. In 1863, he published a book entitled A Pictorial Tour in the Holy Land, illustrated with an abundance of his photographs. In this book, he documents nomadic Arab tribes such as the Qedarites and their way of living. He visited Palestine again in 1869, and was a traveller also in various other parts of the world.

Later in 1900 he published a sketchy biography related to the missionary labours of Emma Herdman.

In 1902 he became resident English chaplain to Christ Church in Düsseldorf, Germany, situated in the former Garden of William Thomas Mulvany, where he died in 1903.

== Bibliography ==
- Isaacs, Albert Augustus (1862), A pictorial tour in the Holy Land, W. Macintosh
