= Ein Feshkha =

West Bank archaeological site

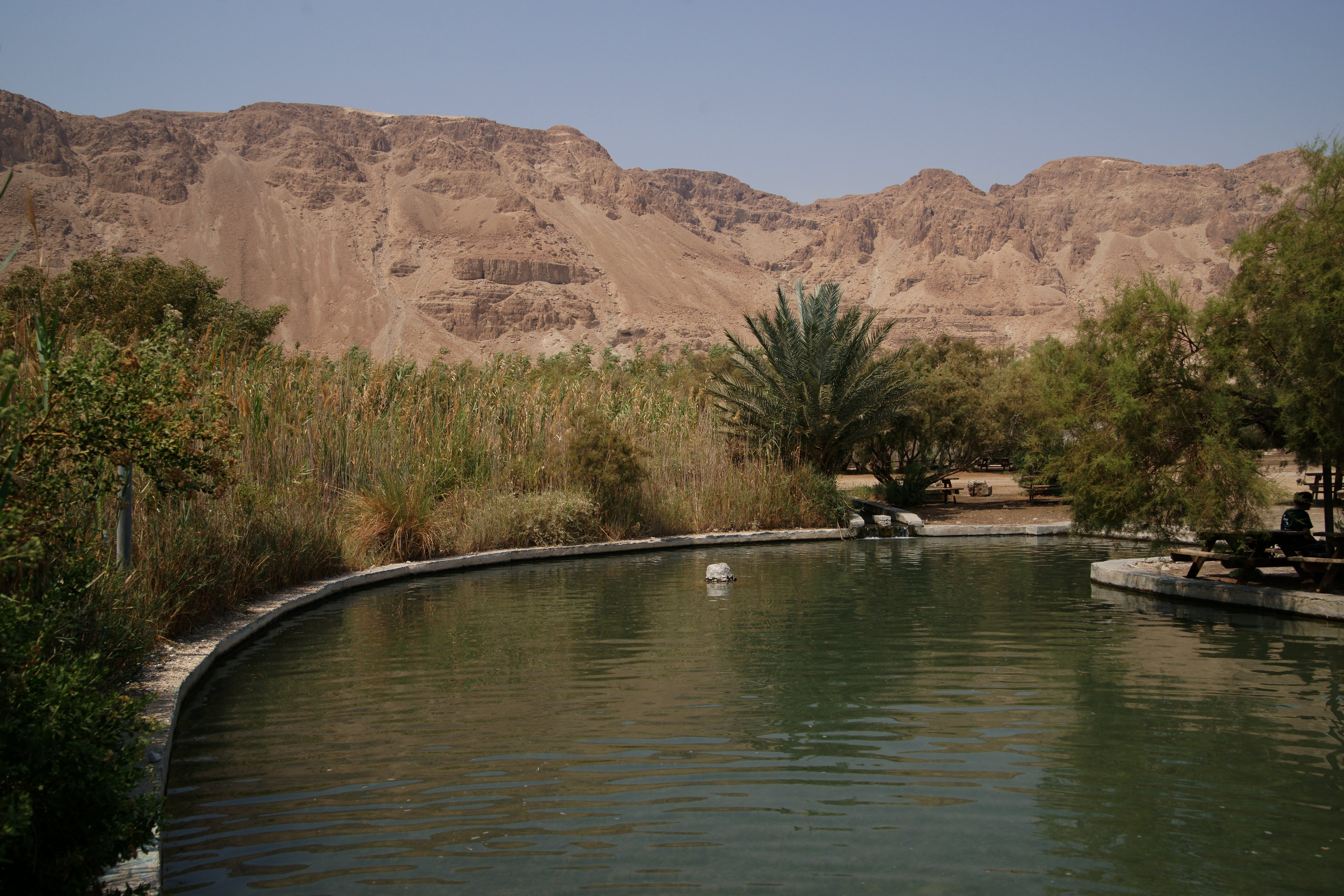
- Ein Feshka/Einot Tzukim

- Location within the West Bank
- 31.7144°N 35.4533°E
- Region: West Bank

Ein Feshkha (Arabic: عين فشخة, also Ain Al-Fashka) or Einot Tzukim (Hebrew: עינות צוקים, lit. 'cliff springs') is a 2,500-hectare (6,200-acre) nature reserve and archaeological site on the north-western shore of the Dead Sea, about 3 km (1.9 mi) south of Qumran in the West Bank. It is located just north of the headland Râs Feshkhah, the "headland of Feshkhah". Within the reserve is a group of springs of brackish water. The nature reserve consists of an open section with pools of mineral water for bathing surrounded by high foliage and a section that is closed to visitors to protect the native flora and fauna.

The archaeological site of Khirbet Mazin is located on the shoreline in the southern part of 'Ein Feshkha nature reserve.

== Etymology ==
'Ain el-Feshkhah means "the spring of el-Feshkhah", Feshkhah being either a personal name, or a word with no meaning.

== Exploration history ==
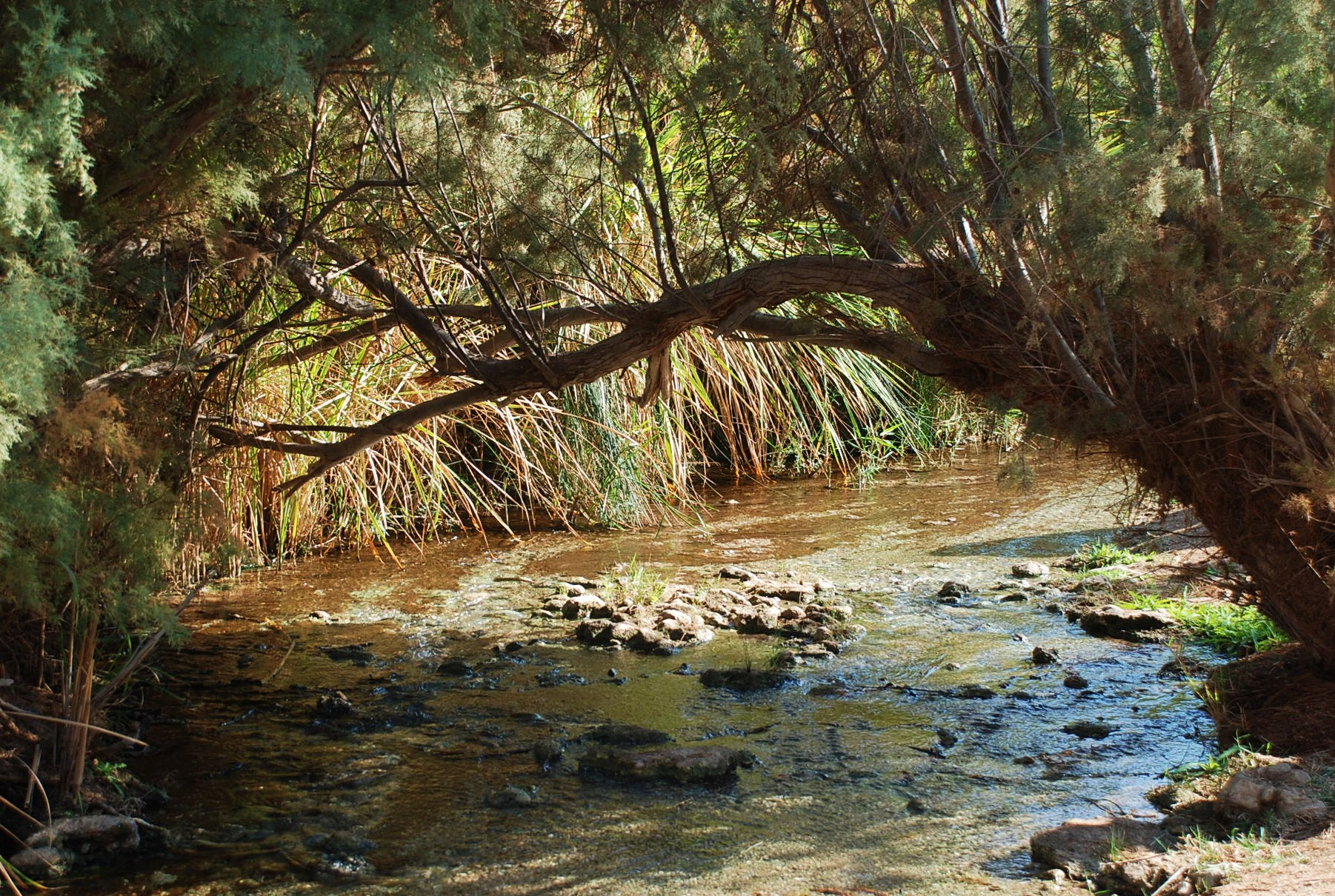
Ein Feshkha

In 1838, Edward Robinson noted that the temperature of the spring was 80 °F (27 °C). He also saw the "foundations of a small square tower and of other small buildings" near the fountain. He further noted a couple of ravens and a small hawk, and his guides killed a large (3 feet 8 inches (1.12 m)) lizard of the Lacerta Nilotica species.

In 1847 William F. Lynch visited the place, and described the stream as: "The fountain is a shallow and clear stream of water, at the temperature of 84° [29 °C], which flows from a cane−brake, near the base of the mountain. It is soft yet brackish, and there is no deposit of silicious or cretaceous matter, but it has a strong smell of sulphur." He further "made an excursion along the base of the mountain, towards Ras es Feshkhah (cape of the stride), and gathered some specimens of conglomerate and some fresh−water shells in the bed of the stream. We were struck with the almost absence of round stones and pebbles upon the beach −the shore is covered with small angular fragments of flint. Started two partridges of a beautiful stone−colour, so much like the rocks, that they could only be distinguished when in motion. Heard the notes of a solitary bird in the cane−brake, which we could not identify. The statement that nothing can live upon the shores of the sea, is, therefore, disproved. The home and the usual haunt of the partridge may be among the cliffs above, but the smaller bird we heard must have its nest in the thicket."

In 1851 de Saulcy noted extensive ruins north of the spring.

Around 1860 Henry Baker Tristram visited, and noted: "Our prospects at Ain Feshkhah seemed as bright as at Jericho, and we were already prepared to pronounce the Dead Sea shore to be the shore of charmed life. Water, vegetation, birds and beasts, geology, and hot baths −everything was in abundance. The poor fountain has had, methinks, rather scurvy treatment at the hands of its biographers. [...] Perhaps our tastes were vitiated, or perhaps after the recent rains the mineral element was unusually diluted; but though the spring itself had a temperature of 82° Fahr. [28 °C] we found it tolerable. It made good tea and coffee, though with a slight flavour of soda, and we had no hesitation in determining to spend two days by its reeds."

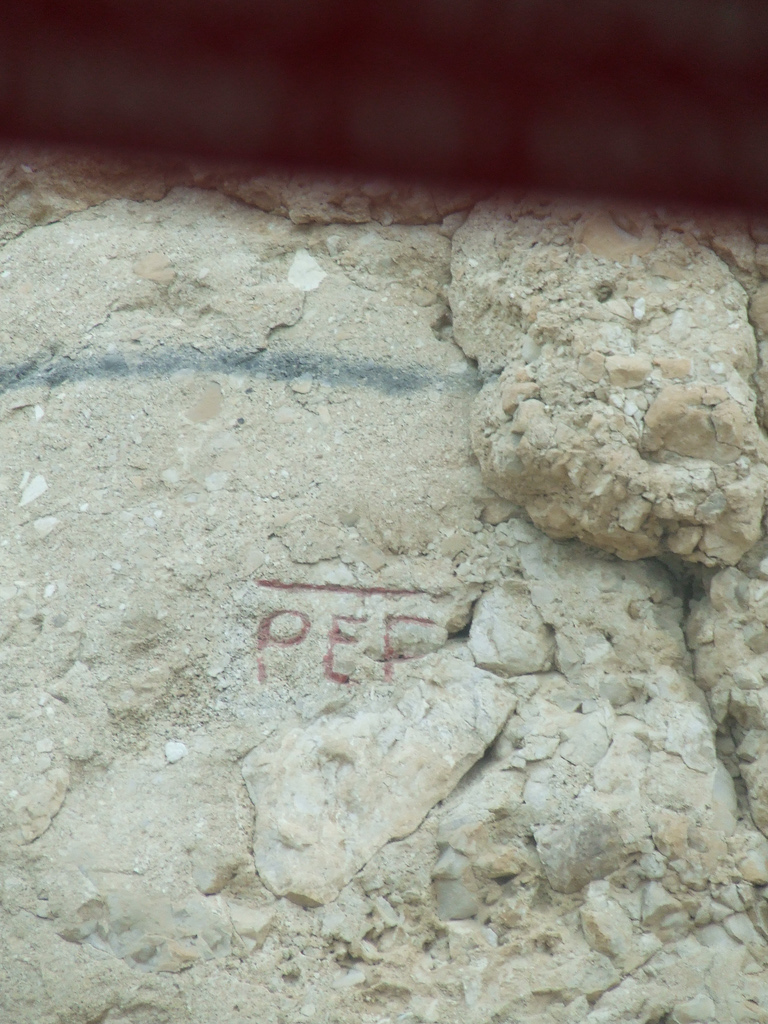
PEF Rock inscription

In 1883, the Palestine Exploration Fund's (PEF) Survey of Western Palestine (SWP) noted: "In the neighbourhood of the Dead Sea there are also two springs of importance. The largest of these is 'Ain Feshkhah, near which is the little spring called 'Ain et Tannur. The water comes out from beneath the cliffs into a pool surrounded with canes, and runs over a shingly bed in several streams into the Dead Sea. The supply is copious and perennial, but has a slightly brackish taste and sulphurous smell. The colour in the pool is a deep green blue."

=== PEF rock: Dead Sea level reference line ===
In October 1900, R. A. Stewart Macalister found a suitable rock towards the southern end of 'Ain Feshkah's reeds area, next to the Dead Sea shore and standing some 20 feet (6.1 m) above the water. A second boulder underneath the first offered a ledge to stand on. He had brought with him a stonemason from Jericho, who carved an 8–9-inch (20–23 cm) long line into the rock face which was to be used for reference, and the initials "PEF" beneath it. It became known as the PEF rock. Macalister undertook a first measurement and noted that the line stood at exactly 14 feet (4.3 m) above the water. Macalister's reference line was then used until 1913 by the PEF researcher, E. W. G. Masterman (1867-1943), who came down from Jerusalem for rigorous biannual measurements. Long-forgotten, it was rediscovered after the Six-Day War by Israeli geographer and cultural researcher, Zev Vilnay.

== Nature reserve ==
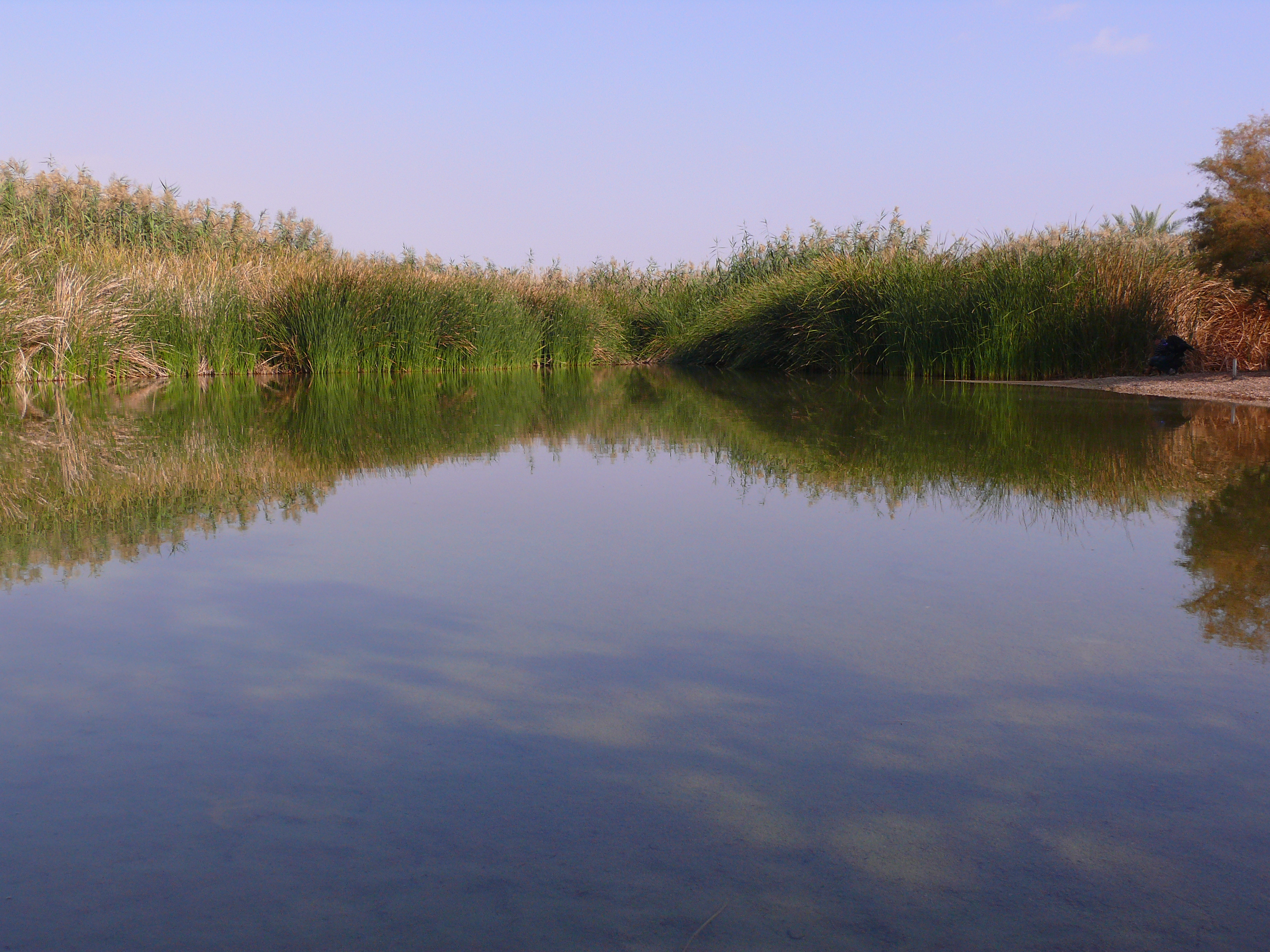
Pool in closed part of the reserve

According to ARIJ, in 1969 Israel confiscated 97 dunams (9.7 ha; 24 acres) of land from the Palestinian village of al-Ubeidiya in order to establish the nature reserve of 'Ayn Fashkhah.

The saline wetlands of Ein Feshkha are the only known place in the world where populations of Blue and Dead Sea killifish (Nevit Hula and Nevit Yam Hamelakh) live side by side. The Israel Nature and Parks Authority and the Israeli Ministry of Agriculture are constructing pools in the area to preserve these native fish. Two of the pools are complete and are now populated by tens of thousands of fish. Measures are also being taken to preserve the tilapia population.

Enot Tsukim is divided into three sections: the northern "closed reserve," the central "visitors reserve," and the southern "hidden reserve." The closed reserve is only open to scientists by special invitation. This section covers approximately 2,700 dunams (270 ha; 670 acres). The 500-dunam (50 ha; 120-acre) visitors reserve features wading pools filled with natural spring water. Due to ecological concerns, the hidden reserve is closed to the public apart from tours on Fridays.

=== Important Bird Area ===
The nature reserve has been recognised as an Important Bird Area (IBA) by BirdLife International because it supports populations of griffon vultures, Dead Sea sparrows and cinereous buntings.

== Archaeology ==
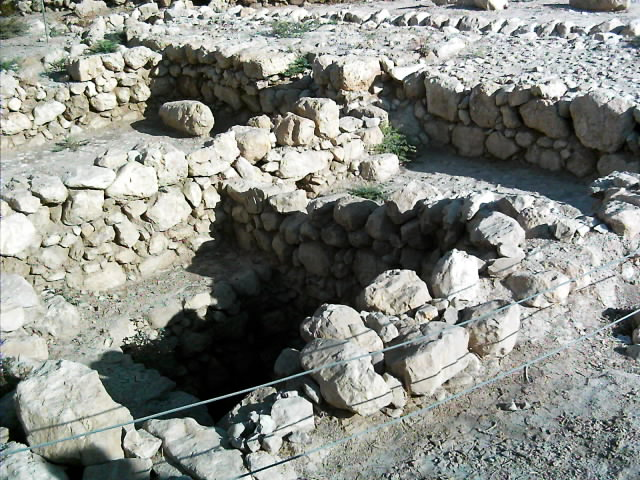
Excavations at Ein Feshkha

Excavations at Ein Feshkha were conducted by Roland de Vaux of the Ecole Biblique in 1956 and 1958. Hirschfeld excavated the site in 2001.

=== Iron Age findings ===
In 2001, Y. Hirschfeld excavated at the site, as well as at the elevated area of the cliff to the west of the spring (Area B). At the cliff, about 50m above Ein Feshkha, he discovered the remnants of a late Iron Age guard tower.

This was a square tower built of blocks of local limestone. It provided a clear view of Feshkha, as well as of Qumran, and as far as the Dead Sea coast. Archaeologists found potsherds there dating from the seventh-sixth centuries BCE (late Iron Age). This type of watchtower was similar to other structures of late Iron Age around the Dead Sea.

=== Herodian complex ===
De Vaux showed that the Ein Feshkha complex was contemporary with the settlement at Qumran and theorized that they were inhabited by the same community and, while he dated traces to the period from 100 to 31 BCE, both Magness and Hirschfeld have concluded that the complex was Herodian, i.e., dates after 37 BCE. Ain el-Ghuweir is another settlement nearby from the same time period.

The complex is composed of a 24-by-18-metre (79 by 59 ft) main building with central courtyard, an industrial installation with two plastered basins to its northeast and what appear to be stables to its west. The entrance was through two doors, side-by-side, to the east. There is a staircase in the southeast corner of the building, showing that there was an upper story.

The spring at Ein Feshkha is now located 100 metres (330 ft) south of the main building found by de Vaux and at least 3 metres (9.8 ft) lower. In ancient times a spring, now dried up, just north of the main building supplied water. This ancient spring being several meters higher suggests that it was sweet, not brackish. A channel brought water from the spring through the wall to the north into a small rectangular tank on to each of the two basins. The purpose of this installation is unknown. It may have served as part of a tannery or for raising fish. More recent analyses suggest it may have been used in indigo manufacturing, date-wine preparation, date-honey production or opobalsam preparation.

The archaeological site of Khirbet Mazin, part of 'Ein Feshkha nature reserve, represents a sophisticated port facility on the Dead Sea, that was most likely built by Alexander Jannaeus. Thousands of his bronze coins were found in the 2001 survey on the shore nearby.

=== Other discoveries ===
Other discoveries at Ein Feshkha include a sizable vase from the first century BCE or CE with an inscription written in Hebrew/Aramaic using the Jewish script and a stone weight dating to the fifth year of king Agrippa, most likely Agrippa I.

== See also ==
- Qumran Caves
- National parks and nature reserves of Israel

== Bibliography ==
- Barag, Dan (2000). "Ein-Feshkha". In Schiffman, Lawrence; VanderKam, James C. (eds.). Encyclopedia of the Dead Sea Scrolls. Vol. 1. Oxford: Oxford University Press. pp. 237–238.
- Bélis, Mirielle (2006). "The Workshops at ʿEin Fashkhah: A New Hypothesis". In Humbert, Jean-Baptiste; Zangenburg, J.; Galor, K. (eds.). The Site of the Dead Sea Scrolls: Archaeological Interpretations and Debates. Leiden: Brill. pp. 253–262. ISBN 978-90-474-0797-3.
- Conder, Claude Reignier; Kitchener, Herbert H. (1883). The Survey of Western Palestine: Memoirs of the Topography, Orography, Hydrography, and Archaeology. Vol. 3. London: Committee of the Palestine Exploration Fund.
- de Saulcy, Louis Félicien (1854). Narrative of a journey round the Dead Sea, and in the Bible lands, in 1850 and 1851. Vol. 2 (New ed.). London: R. Bentley.
- de Vaux, Roland (1959). "Fouilles de Feshka, Rapport preliminaire". Revue Biblique (in French). 66: 225–255.
- Hirschfeld, Yizhar (2004a). Qumran in Context: Reassessing the Archaeological Evidence. Peabody, MA: Hendrickson. pp. 183–209.
- Hull, E. (1886). The Survey of Western Palestine: Memoir on the Physical Geology and Geography of Arabia Petraea. Vol. 7. Committee of the Palestine Exploration Fund.
- Lynch, W.F. (1849). Narrative of the United States' Expedition to the River Jordan and the Dead Sea. London: Richard Bentley.
- Magness, Jodi (2002). Archaeology and the Dead Sea Scrolls. Grand Rapids: Eerdmans. pp. 210–217.
- Netzer, Ehud (2005). "Did Any Perfume Industry Exist at ʿEin Fashkhah?". Israel Exploration Journal. 55: 97–100.
- Palmer, E.H. (1881). The Survey of Western Palestine: Arabic and English Name Lists Collected During the Survey by Lieutenants Conder and Kitchener, R. E. Transliterated and Explained by E.H. Palmer. Committee of the Palestine Exploration Fund.
- Robinson, E.; Smith, E. (1841). Biblical Researches in Palestine, Mount Sinai and Arabia Petraea: A Journal of Travels in the year 1838. Vol. 2. Boston: Crocker & Brewster.
- Taylor, Joan (2006). "Ein Fashkha". Encyclopaedia Judaica. Vol. 6 (2nd ed.). Macmillan Reference. pp. 255–256. ISBN 0-02-865928-7.
- Tristram, Henry Baker (1865). Land of Israel, A Journal of travel in Palestine, undertaken with special reference to its physical character. London: Society for Promoting Christian Knowledge.
