= Ain el-Ghuweir =

Archaeological site on the Dead Sea in the West Bank

Coordinates: 31.62255°N 35.41026°E

Ain el-Ghuweir or ʿAyn el-Ghuweir, more commonly spelled Ein el-Ghuweir and 'Ein el-Ghuweir in recent literature (older spelling of the Arabic name: Ain Al-Ghuwair) is an archaeological site located about 15 km south of Khirbet Qumran in the West Bank, on the western shore of the Dead Sea. Here, a marshy area fed by numerous springs extends for about 2 km, which in the northern part has the Arabic name ʿAin el-Ghuweir (ʿein meaning spring), and the southern part is ʿAin at-Turaba, more commonly spelled now as Ein et-Turabeh or 'Ein et-Turabeh. The modern Hebrew names are ʿEinot Qaneh (for 'Ein el-Ghuweir) and ʿEinot Samar (for 'Ein et-Turabeh). The short gorge that opens into the valley of the Dead Sea at ʿAin el-Ghuweir is called Wadi Ghuweir in Arabic, and Naḥal Qaneh in modern Hebrew.

Nearby to the north, between Ain el-Ghuweir and Qumran, is the similar site of Ein Feshkha.

== Investigations ==
The archaeological sites on the western shore of the Dead Sea, including the ruins of Ayn el-Ghuweir, were investigated by Ian Blake from 1964 to 1966 on behalf of the British School of Archaeology in Jerusalem. Blake described a 350 m long wall parallel to the shoreline, and between the wall and the shore a building with a floor area of 7.5 × 10 m, which he interpreted as having three rooms and a courtyard. It had already been destroyed by fire in ancient times. In one of the rooms, Blake found household pottery, and in the fire debris of the doorway, he found the metal door knocker.

Between 1967 and 1976, the Israel Antiquities Authority carried out a comprehensive excavation of ʿAin el-Ghuweir under the direction of Pessah Bar-Adon.

== Iron Age period ==
Bar-Adon found remains of a settlement from the Iron Age II (8th/7th century BC), which he identified with the biblical place Nibshan. The most prominent feature was a 600 m long wall with 18 rooms attached to both sides, but mostly on the east side. One building with a floor area of 8 × 11 m (five rooms and an inner courtyard) served commercial purposes; the excavator suspected a perfume production site here.

The Iron Age ʿAyn al-Turaba in the southern part of the oasis was a fortified tower with a base area of 15 × 13 m, with a courtyard to the north. According to Bar-Adon, all buildings in the oasis were abandoned in the context of the conquest of Jerusalem by the Neo-Babylonians in 587/586 BC.

Since only one construction phase is known, but late Hellenistic-early Roman pottery was also found on the ground floor, Yizhar Hirschfeld argues that the entire structure should be dated to this later period.

== Hasmonean and Herodian periods ==
In the Hasmonean and Herodian periods (Khirbet Qumran, construction phases Ib and II), the oasis of ʿAin el-Ghuweir was inhabited again. A new settlement was built in addition to the reconstruction of the Iron Age ruins. This new complex comprised a walled area measuring 43 × 19.5 m. Inside was located a large rectangular courtyard (described by Bar-Adon as a hall) and a porch with a narrow rectangular ground plan, the roof of which was supported by wooden columns on stone bases. The walls were preserved to a height of up to 1.4 m, with an average height of about 70 cm. The finds included sack-shaped storage vessels, jars, household pottery, and lamps (including two of the Herodian type). Seven bronze coins were found on the floor: five coins of Herod, one of Herod Archelaus and one of Herod Agrippa I (i.e., between 37 BC and 44 AD).

Hirschfeld describes the building complex of ʿAyn el-Ghuweir during this period as a fortified estate with a characteristic combination of residential quarters and agricultural facilities. According to Bar-Adon, this was a communal building for meetings and ritual purposes of the Qumran Essenes, who themselves lived in tents, huts, and caves.

About 800 m north of the settlement, Bar-Adon examined a mound littered with pottery shards, where pottery and skeletal remains had been located. It was an ancient cemetery that bore a strong resemblance to the complex of Khirbet Qumran: the dead at the Qumran cemeteries had been buried supine in a north–south orientation in shaft graves. In the graves of the northern group, skeletons of 12 men aged between 18 and 60/70 years and 6 women aged between 18 and 34 years were found; in the south there was the grave of a man and a child. A colored (red or purple) dust was often found on the bones. Next to the handle of a jar from Grave 18, the name was found in Hebrew letters. This made it clear to Bar-Adon that it was an ancient Jewish cemetery.

The settlement was destroyed by the Roman army during the Jewish War around 68 AD.

== See also ==
- Khirbet Mazin
- Qumran Caves
- Qumran cemetery
- National parks and nature reserves of Israel

== Bibliography ==
- Pessach Bar-Adon: Another Settlement of the Judean Desert Sect at ʿEn el-Ghuweir on the Shores of the Dead Sea. In: Bulletin of the American Schools of Oriental Research 227 (1977), S. 1–25.
- Ian Blake: Rivage occidental de la Mer Morte. In: Revue Biblique 73 (1966), S. 565–566.
- Jodi Magness: The Chronology of Qumran, Ein Feshkha, and Ein el-Ghuweir. In: Dies., Debating Qumran. Collected Essays on its Archaeology (= Interdisciplinary Studies in Ancient Culture and Religion. Band 4). Peeters, Leuven u. a. 2004, S. 49–61.
- Joseph Patrich: Ghweir, Wadi. In: Lawrence H. Schiffman, James C. VanderKam (Hrsg.): Encyclopedia of the Dead Sea Scrolls. Oxford University Press, Online-Version von 2008.
- Émile Puech: The Necropolises of Khirbet Qumrân and ʿAin el-Ghuweir and the Essene Belief in Afterlife. In: Bulletin of the American Schools of Oriental Research 312 (1998), S. 21–36.
- Joseph Yellin, Magen Broshi, Hanan Eshel: Pottery of Qumran and Ein Ghuweir: The First Chemical Exploration of Provenience. In: Bulletin of the American Schools of Oriental Research 321 (2001), S. 65–78.
