= Qumran (disambiguation) =

Qumran is an archaeological site in the West Bank.

Qumran may also refer to:

- Qumran cemetery
- Qumran Caves, a set of caves in the West Bank
- 52301 Qumran, the asteroid Qumran, 52301st asteroid catalogued
- Revue de Qumran, see List of theology journals
- A fictional Arab country in the television programme Yes Minister

== See also ==
- Qumran Scrolls, the Dead Sea Scrolls
