= Shemen Afarsimon =

Biblical oil

Shemen afarsimon (Hebrew: שֶׁמֶן אֲפַרְסְמוֹן šemen ʾăp̄arsəmōn) was a prized oil used in antiquity. The ancient Jewish community of Ein Gedi was known for its cultivation of the afarsimon.

== Balsam and afarsimon in Judaism ==
The Hebrew Bible does not mention persimmons, but in the Talmud and Midrash the Hebrew term may also stand for balsam, which occurs once in the Hebrew Bible as Hebrew besami (בְּשָׂמִי) "my spice" (pronounced [bə.ɬaːˈmiː]) in Song of Songs 5:1, which is indirect evidence of the form basam (בָּשָׂם; pronounced [baːˈɬaːm]).

In modern Hebrew, the word afarsimon is translated as persimmon. However, some doubt that persimmons would have been known to the peoples of the Bible, although being a traditional Jewish New Year's food in the Diaspora.

According to Adin Steinsaltz, the afarsimon of the Talmud was considered very valuable, and worth its weight in gold.

== Identification ==
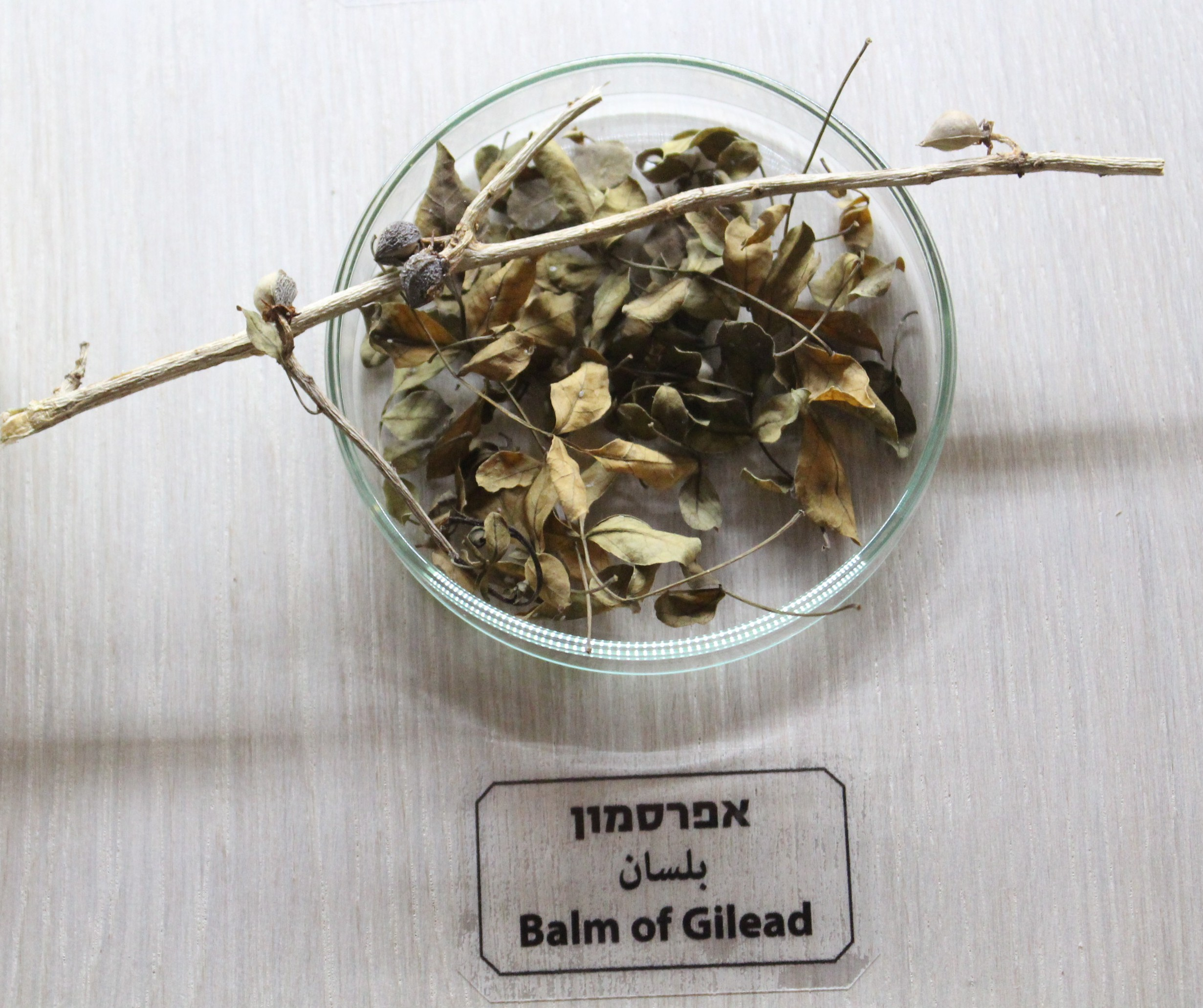

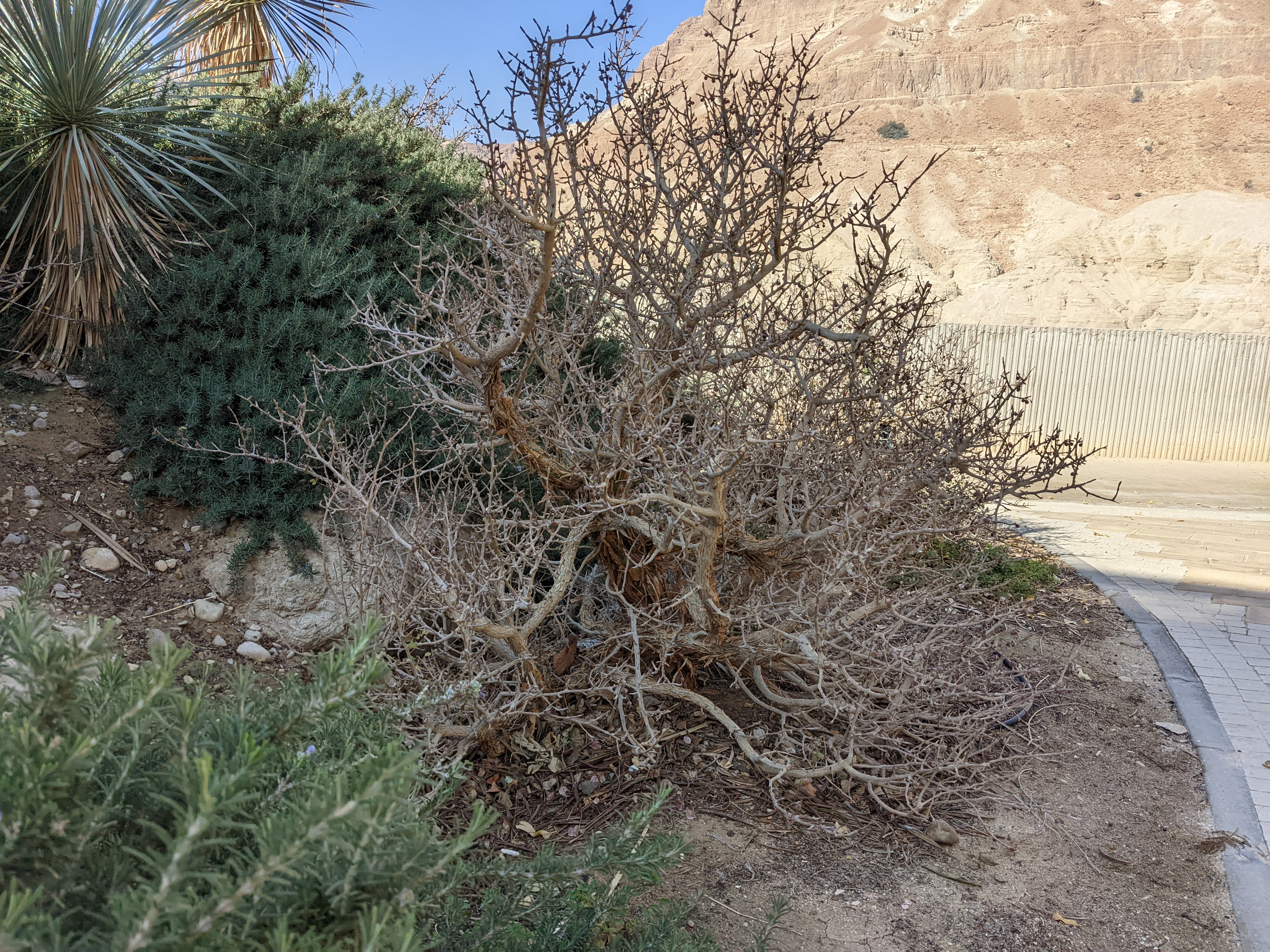
Commiphora gileadensis, identified by some as the ancient Afarsimon, in the Botanical gardens of Kibbutz Ein-Gedi

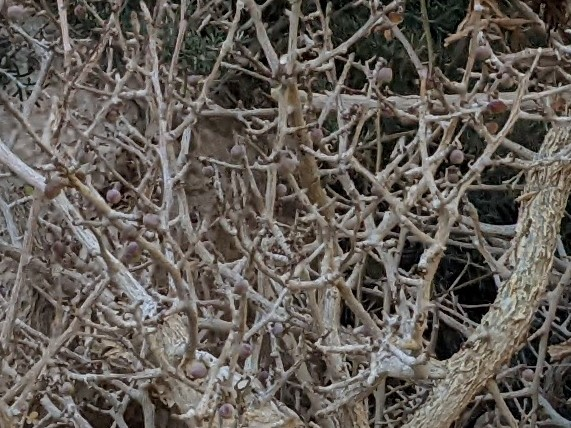
Branches and fruit of a Commiphora gileadensis shrub

It is not known exactly what plant was used to produce the biblical oil. According to one theory, it is the plant Commiphora opobalsamum - a small shrub, 10 to 12 feet high, with wandlike, spreading branches. The oil extracted from the seeds or branches of this plant has been used as a medicine, but more commonly as incense or perfumed oil.

== Qumran jug ==
In April 1988, archeologists working with the former Baptist minister Vendyl Jones discovered a small jug of oil in the Qumran region that Jones announced was the oil used in the Temple. The find was announced by The New York Times on February 15, 1989, and a feature article was published in National Geographic Magazine in October of that year. After testing by the Pharmaceutical Department of the Hebrew University of Jerusalem (the results of which were never detailed or revealed), the substance inside the juglet was claimed by Jones to be the shemen afarsimon hinted at in Psalm 133. According to Jones, it was the first artifact discovered from the First Temple Period, and one of the treasures listed in the Copper Scroll. However, this identification remains controversial.

== See also ==
- Balm of Gilead
- Balsam of Mecca
- Commiphora gileadensis
- Holy anointing oil
- Perfume
