= Dan Barag =

Israeli archaeologist (1935–2009)

- דן בר"ג
- Born: 13 September 1935; London
- Died: 20 November 2009 (aged 74); Jerusalem
- Resting place: Har HaMenuchot
- Occupations: Archaeologist and educator
- Awards: Arie Kindler Prize

Dan Barag (Hebrew: דן בר"ג; 13 September 1935 – 20 November 2009) was an Israeli archeologist and educator who served as a professor at the Archeological department of the Hebrew University of Jerusalem. He is known for his work in the field of ancient glass history and leading the research team that excavated the ancient synagogue in Ein Gedi.

== Biography ==
Dan Barag was born in London in 1935 during his parents journey from Berlin to Israel. He was raised in the city of Tel Aviv and moved to Jerusalem in 1956 in order to study archaeology at the Hebrew University of Jerusalem. He completed his Phd. in 1970 under the guidance of Prof. Nahman Avigad and Prof. Donald Harden. His studies in the field of ancient glass vessels in the Land of Israel was followed by numerous articles on the subject that brought him worldwide acknowledgement.

== Archaeological and numismatic career ==
In 1970 Dan Barag joined the archaeological department of the Hebrew University, in 1973 he became a senior lecturer, 1978 an associate professor and in 1985 a professor.

Dan Barag continued teaching at the university until his retirement in 2003. In 1970 he led the excavation that discovered the ancient synagogue of En-Gedi. He was a specialist in the field of Numismatics. For 30 years he served as President of the Israeli Numismatics Society and head editor of its journal, Israel Numismatic Journal (INJ). A festschrift memorial edition of INJ was published in memory of Dr. Barag in 2011, with memorials written by Nitzan Amitai-Preiss and Rachel Barkai.

Barag took part in notable excavations such as: Tell Qasile, Hanita, Nahariya and Beth She‘arim. In addition Barag had several rolls in the Israel Exploration Journal, from associate editor to editor and then up to his death he was part of the Editorial Advisory Board.
