= Solomon H. Steckoll =

Solomon H. Steckoll was a South African journalist with an interest in ancient Jewish matters. He carried out excavations in the Qumran cemetery and later wrote books about the Jerusalem temple and the gates of Jerusalem.

In 1966 Steckoll obtained permission from the Jordanian Antiquities Department to investigate the Qumran cemetery, opening two of the tombs and recovering two male skeletons. In 1967 he opened a further eight tombs, recovering five male and three female skeletons.

During his investigations Steckoll also found an inkwell at Qumran.

When Israel took control of the West Bank, Steckoll lost rights to excavate in the cemetery. Roland de Vaux explains it somewhat bitterly, "The authorities of the Israeli occupation have forbidden this Sherlock Holmes of archaeology to continue his researches at Qumran."

== Books by Steckoll ==
- The gates of Jerusalem (New York: Praeger, 1968; London: Allen & Unwin, 1968)
- The Temple Mount: an illustrated history of Mount Moriah in Jerusalem (London, Tom Stacey Ltd, 1972)
- The Alderney Death Camp (London: Granada Publishing Limited 1982) ISBN 0-583-13478-5
