= Balm of Gilead =

Historic herbal perfume

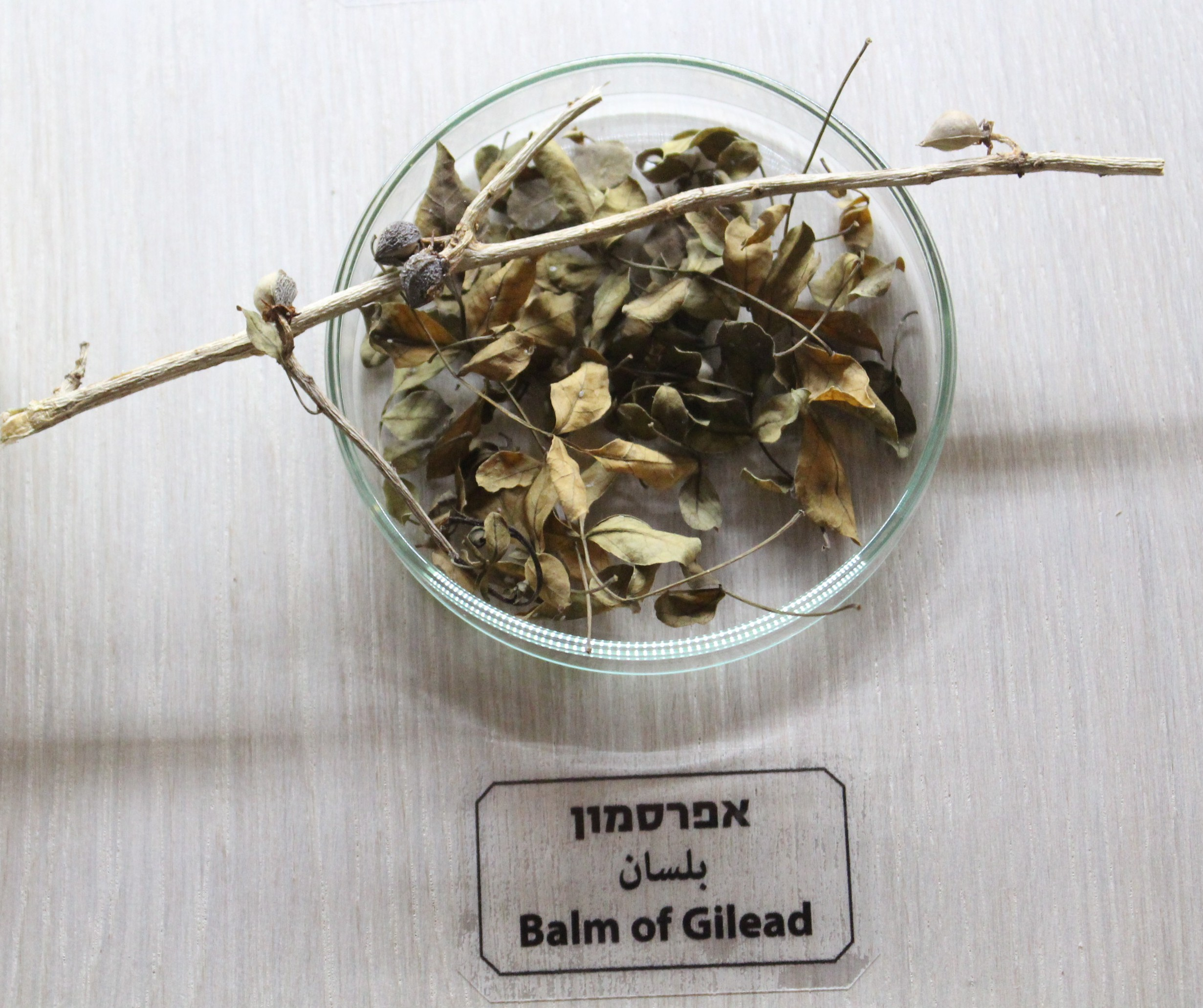
Plant considered to be the basis of the balm of Gilead, exhibition in Jerusalem

Balm of Gilead was a rare perfume used medicinally that was mentioned in the Hebrew Bible and named for the region of Gilead, where it was said to have been produced. The tree or shrub from which the balm was extracted and processed was historically very commonly mis-identified as the misnomerical Commiphora gileadensis, whose common name was in turn established by the ubiquity of such confusion. True Balm of Gilead was actually derived from Pistacia lentiscus.

== History ==
=== Hebrew Bible ===
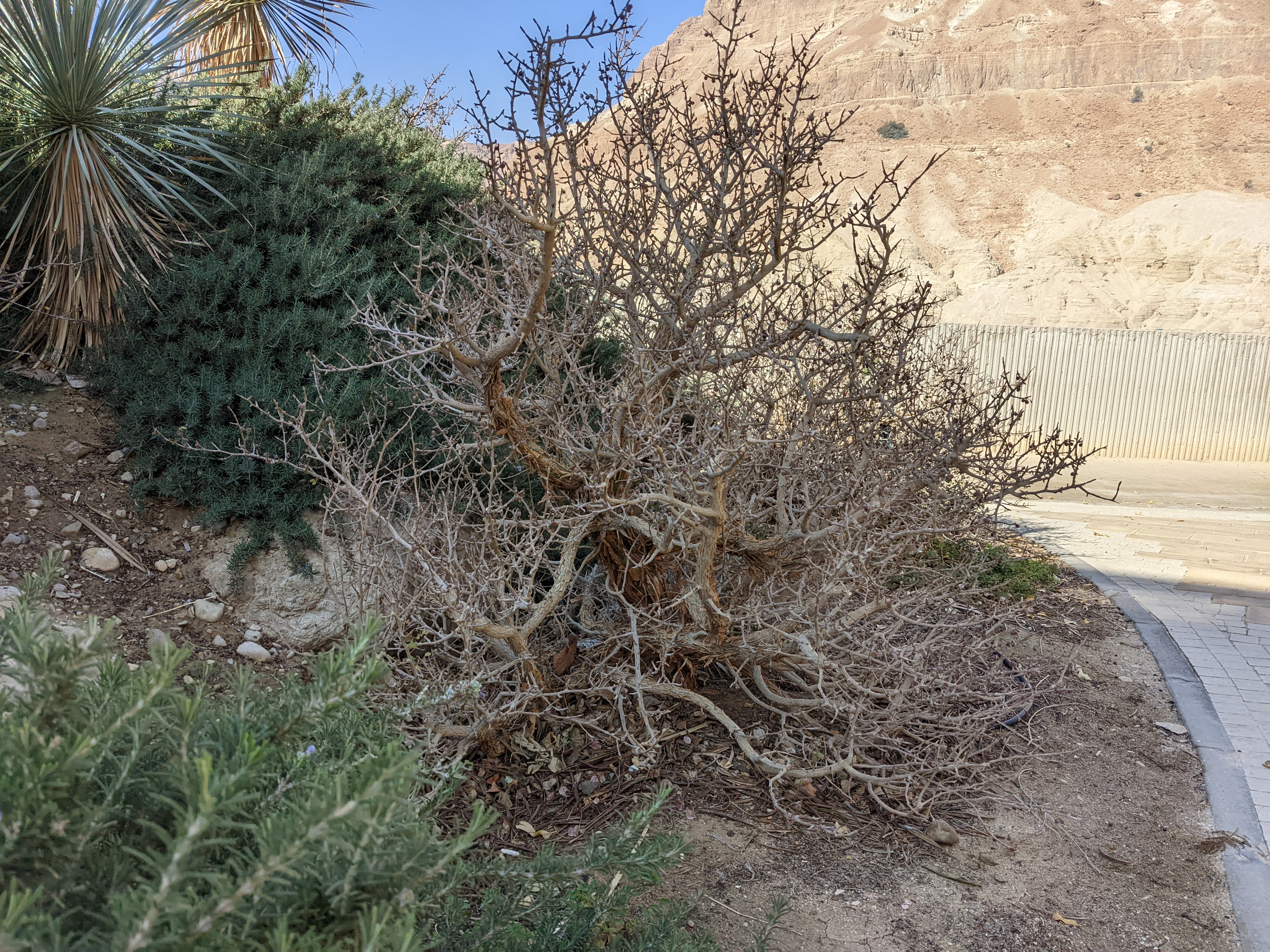
Commiphora gileadensis, identified by some as the ancient balm of Gilead, in the Botanical gardens of Kibutz Ein-Gedi

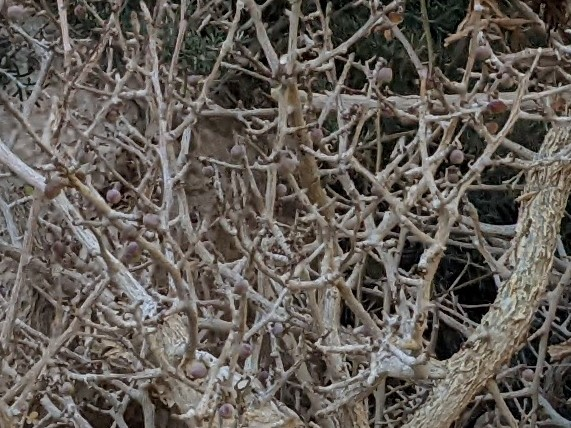
Branches and fruit of a Commiphora gileadensis shrub

In the Bible, balsam is designated by various names: בֹּשֶׂם (bosem), בֶּשֶׂם (besem), צֳרִי (tsari), נָטָף (nataf), which all differ from the terms used in rabbinic literature.

After having cast Joseph into a pit, his brothers noticed a caravan on its way from Gilead to Egypt, "with their camels bearing spicery, and balm, and myrrh" (Gen. 37:25). When Jacob dispatched his embassy into Egypt, his present to the unknown ruler included "a little balm" (Gen. 43:11). During the final years of the Kingdom of Judah, Jeremiah asks "Is there no balm in Gilead?" (Jer. 8:22). Still later, from an expression in Ezekiel 27:17, balm was one of the commodities which Hebrew merchants carried to the market of Tyre. According to 1 Kings 10:10, balsam (Hebrew: bosem) was among the many precious gifts of the Queen of Sheba to King Solomon.

=== Greco-Roman ===
In the later days of Jewish history, the neighborhood of Jericho was believed to be the only spot where the true balsam grew, and even there its culture was confined to two gardens, the one twenty acres in extent, the other much smaller (Theophrastus).

According to Josephus, the Queen of Sheba brought "the root of the balsam" as a present to King Solomon (Ant. 8.6.6).

In describing Judaea, Tacitus says that in all its productions it equals Italy, besides possessing the palm and the balsam (Hist. 5:6); and the far-famed tree excited the cupidity of successive invaders. By Pompey it was exhibited in the streets of Rome as one of the spoils of the newly conquered province in 65 BCE; and one of the wonderful trees graced the triumph of Vespasian in 79 CE. During the invasion of Titus, two battles took place at the balsam groves of Jericho, the last being to prevent the Jews in their despairing frenzy from destroying the trees. Then they became public property, and were placed under the protection of an imperial guard; but history does not record how long the two plantations survived.

According to Pliny (Hist. Nat. 12:54), the balsam-tree was indigenous only to Judea, but known to Diodorus Siculus (3:46) as a product of Arabia also. In Palestine, praised by other writers also for its balsam (Justinus, 36:3; Tacitus, Hist. 5:6; Plutarchus, Vita Anton. c. 36; Florus, Epitome bellorum 3.5.29; Dioscorides, De materia medica 1:18) this plant was cultivated in the environs of Jericho (Strabo, 16:763; Diodorus Siculus 2:48; 19:98), in gardens set apart for this use (Pliny, Hist. Nat. 12:54; see Josephus, Ant. 14.4.1; 15.4.2; War 1.6.6); and after the destruction of the state of Judea, these plantations formed a lucrative source of the Roman imperial revenue (see Diodorus Siculus 2:48).

Pliny distinguishes three different species of this plant; the first with thin, capillaceous leaves; the second a crooked scabrous shrub; and the third with smooth rind and of taller growth than the two former. He tells us that, in general, the balsam plant, a shrub, has the nearest resemblance to the grapevine, and its mode of cultivation is almost the same. The leaves, however, more closely resemble those of the rue, and the plant is an evergreen. Its height does not exceed two cubits. From slight incisions made very cautiously into the rind (Josephus, Ant. 14.4.1; War 1.6.6) the balsam trickles in thin drops, which are collected with wool into a horn, and then preserved in new earthen jars. At first it is whitish and pellucid, but afterwards it becomes harder and reddish. That is considered to be the best quality which trickles before the appearance of the fruit. Much inferior to this is the resin pressed from the seeds, the rind, and even from the stems (see Theophrastus, Hist. Plant. 9:6; Strabo 16:763; Pausanias 9.28.2). This description, which is not sufficiently characteristic of the plant itself, suits for the most part the Egyptian balsam-shrub found by Belon in a garden near Cairo. The plant, however, is not indigenous to Egypt, but the layers are brought there from Arabia Felix; Prosperus Alpinus has published a plate of it.

Dioscorides (De materia medica) attributes many medical properties to balsam, such as expelling menstrual flow; being an abortifacient; moving the urine; assisting breathing and conception; being an antidote for aconitum and snakebite; treating pleurisy, pneumonia, cough, sciatica, epilepsy, vertigo, asthma, and gripes (sharp bowel pains).

In the era of Galen, who flourished in the second century, and travelled to Palestine and Syria purposely to obtain a knowledge of this substance, it grew in Jericho and many other parts of the Holy Land.

=== Rabbinic literature ===
The terms used in rabbinic literature are different from those used in the Hebrew Bible: קׇטׇף (kataf), בַּלְסׇם (balsam), אַפּוֹבַּלְסַמוֹן (appobalsamon), and אֲפַרְסְמוֹן (afarsemon).

In the Talmud, balsam appears as a valued ointment produced by the Jericho plain, but its main use was as a topical medication rather than as a cosmetic. Rav Yehudah composed a special blessing for balsam: "Who creates the oil of our land". Young women used it as a perfume to seduce young men.

=== Arab ===
The balsam, carried originally, says Arab tradition, from Yemen by the Queen of Sheba, as a gift to Solomon, and planted by him in the gardens of Jericho, was brought to Egypt by Cleopatra, and planted at Ain-Shemesh (Ain Shams), in a garden which all the old travellers, Arab and Christian, mention with deep interest.

Prosper Alpinus relates that forty plants were brought by a governor of Cairo to the garden there, and ten remained when Belon travelled in Egypt, but only one existed in the 18th century. By the 19th century, there appeared to be none.

=== Modern ===
The German botanist Schweinfurth (1836–1925) claimed to have reconstructed the ancient process of balsam production.

== Lexicon ==
=== Hebrew tsori ===
In the Hebrew Bible, the balm of Gilead is tsori or tseri (צֳרִי or צְרִי). It is a merchandise in Gen. 37:25 and Ez. 27:17, a gift in Gen. 43:11, and a medicament (for national disaster, in fig.) in Jer. 8:22, 46:11, 51:8. The Hebrew root z-r-h (צרה) means "run blood, bleed" (of vein), with cognates in Arabic (ﺿﺮﻭ, an odoriferous tree or its gum), Sabaean (צרו), Syriac (ܙܪܘܐ, possibly fructus pini), and Greek (στύραξ, in meaning).

Many attempts have been made to identify the tsori, but none can be considered conclusive. The Samaritan Pentateuch (Gen. 37:25) and the Syriac bible (Jer. 8:22) translate it as wax (cera). The Septuagint has ῥητίνη, "pine resin". The Arabic version and Castell hold it for theriac. Lee supposes it to be "mastich". Luther and the Swedish version have "salve", "ointment" in the passages in Jer., but in Ezek. 27:17 they read "mastic". Gesenius, Hebrew commentators (Kimchi, Junius, Tremellius, Deodatius), and the Authorized Version (except in Ezek. 27:17, rosin) have balm, balsam, Greek βάλσαμον, Latin opobalsamum.

=== Hebrew nataph ===
Besides the tsori, another Hebrew word, nataph (נׇטׇף), mentioned in Ex. 30:34, as an ingredient of the holy incense, is taken by Hebrew commentators for opobalsamum; this, however, is perhaps rather stacte.

=== Hebrew bosem ===
Another Hebrew word, bosem (בֹּשֶׂם), Aramaic busema (ܒܣܡܐ), Arabic besham (بشام), appears in various forms throughout the Hebrew Bible. It is usually translated as "spice, perfume, sweet odour, balsam, balsam-tree".

=== Greek balsamon ===
Greek authors use the words βάλσαμον (Theophrastus, Aristotle) for the balsam plant and its resin, while Galen, Nicander and the Geoponica consider it an aromatic herb, like mint. The word is probably Semitic. ὁπο-βάλσᾰμον (Theophrastus) is the juice of the balsam tree. βαλσαμίνη (Dioscorides) is the balsam plant. Palladius names it βάλσαμος and also has βαλσαμουργός, a preparer of balsam. Related are ξῠλο-βάλσᾰμον (Dioscorides, Strabo) "balsam-wood", and καρπο-βάλσᾰμον (Galen) "the fruit of the balsam".

=== Latin balsamum ===
Latin authors use balsamum (Tacitus, Pliny, Florus, Scribonius Largus, Celsus, Columella, Martialis) for the balsam tree, branches, and resin, opobalsamum (Pliny, Celsus, Scribonius Largus, Martialis, Statius, Juvenal) for the sap, and xylobalsamum (Pliny, Scribonius Largus, Celsus) for balsam wood, all derived from Greek.

== Plants ==
Assuming that the tsori was a plant product, several plants have been proposed as its source.

=== Mastic ===
Celsius (in Hierobotanicon) identified the tsori with the mastic tree, Pistacia lentiscus L. The Arabic name of this plant is dseri or dseru, which is identical with the Hebrew tsori. Rauwolf and Pococke found the plant occurring at Joppa.

=== Zukum ===
Ödmann and Rosenmüller thought that the pressed juice of the fruit of the zukum-tree (Elaeagnus angustifolia L.) or the myrobalanus of the ancients, is the substance denoted; but Rosenmüller, in another place, mentioned the balsam of Mecca (Amyris opobalsamum L., now Commiphora gileadensis (L.) C.Chr.) as being probably the tsori. Zukum oil was in very high esteem among the Arabs, who even preferred it to the balm of Mecca, as being more efficacious in wounds and bruises. Maundrell found zukum-trees near the Dead Sea. Hasselquist and Pococke found them especially in the environs of Jericho. In the 19th century, the only product in the region of Gilead which had any affinity to balm or balsam was a species of Eleagnus.

=== Terebinth ===
Bochart strongly contended that the balm mentioned in Jer. 8:22 could not possibly be that of Gilead, and considered it as the resin drawn from the terebinth. The Biblical terebinth is Hebrew eloh (אֵלׇה), Pistacia terebinthus L.

=== Pine ===
The Greek word ῥητίνη, used in the Septuagint for translating tsori, denotes a resin of the pine, especially Pinus maritima (πεύκη). The Aramaic tserua (ܨܪܘܐ) has been described as the fruit of Pinus pinea L., but it has also been held for stacte or storax. The Greek ῥητίνη ξηρά is a species of Pinaceae Rich.

=== Cancamon ===
The lexicographer Bar Seroshewai considered the Arabic dseru (ﺿﺮﻭ), a tree of Yemen known as kamkam (ﮐﻤﮑﺎﻡ) or kankam (ﮐﻨﮑﺎﻡ), Syriac qazqamun (ܩܙܩܡܘܢ), Greek κάγκαμον, Latin cancamum, mentioned by Dioscorides (De materia medica 1.32) and Pliny (Hist. Nat. 12.44; 12.98). Cancamon has been held for Commiphora kataf, but also as Aleurites laccifer (Euphorbiaceae), Ficus spec. (Artocarpeae), and Butea frondosa (Papilionaceae).

Sanskrit kunkuma (कुनकुम) is saffron (Crocus sativus).

=== Balm of Mecca ===
Peter Forsskål (1732–1763) found the plant occurring between Mecca and Medina. He considered it to be the genuine balsam-plant and named it Amyris opobalsamum Forsk. (together with two other varieties, Amyris kataf Forsk. and Amyris kafal Forsk.). Its Arabic name is abusham or basham, which is identical to the Hebrew bosem or beshem. Bruce found the plant occurring in Abyssinia. In the 19th century it was discovered in the East Indies also.

Linnaeus distinguished two varieties: Amyris gileadensis L. (= Amyris opobalsamum Forsk.), and Amyris opobalsamum L., the variant found by Belon in a garden near Cairo, brought there from Arabia Felix. More recent naturalists (Lindley, Wight and Walker) have included the species Amyris gileadensis L. in the genus Protium. Botanists enumerate sixteen balsamic plants of this genus, each exhibiting some peculiarity.

There is little reason to doubt that the plants of the Jericho balsam gardens were stocked with Amyris gileadensis L., or Amyris opobalsamum, which was found by Bruce in Abyssinia, the fragrant resin of which is known in commerce as the "balsam of Mecca". According to De Sacy, the true balm of Gilead (or Jericho) has long been lost, and there is only "balm of Mecca".

The accepted name of the balsam plant is Commiphora gileadensis (L.) Christ., synonym Commiphora opobalsamum.

=== Cedronella ===
Cedronella canariensis, a perennial herb in the mint family, is also known as Balm of Gilead, or Herb of Gilead.

== Flammability ==
Balsam oil was too volatile and flammable to be used as fuel.

According to the 13th-century (?) Liber Ignium (Book of Fires), balsam was an ingredient of ancient incendiaries akin to Greek fire.

== Bibliography ==
Encyclopedias, dictionaries, lexica

- CBTEL – John McClintock; James Strong, eds. (1891), Cyclopædia of Biblical, Theological and Ecclesiastical Literature, Harper & Brothers( This article incorporates text from this source, which is in the public domain.)
- EJ – Skolnik, Fred, ed. (2007), Encyclopaedia Judaica (2nd ed.), Thomson Gale, ISBN 9780028659282
- GEL – Henry Liddell; Robert Scott, eds. (1897), Greek-English Lexicon (8th ed.), Harper & Brothers
- HEL – Francis Brown, ed. (1906), Hebrew and English Lexicon, Oxford University Press
- OLD – Oxford Latin Dictionary, Oxford University Press, 1968
- SED – Williams, Monier (1872), A Sanskrit-English Dictionary, Clarendon Press

Other works

- Berthelot, Marcellin (1893), La chimie au moyen âge, vol. I, Imprimerie nationale, pp. 101–107
- Dioscorides (1902), "Kankamon", in Julius Berendes (ed.), De materia medica (PDF), PharmaWiki.ch, archived from the original (PDF) on 24 September 2015
- Feliks, Jehuda, "Balsam", EJ, vol. 3 (2nd ed.), p. 95
- Groom, Nigel (1981). Frankincense and Myrrh: A Study of the Arabian Incense Trade. Arab background series. London and New York: Longman, Librairie de Liban. pp. 41, 126. ISBN 978-0-582-76476-7.
- Langkavel, Bernhard (1866), Botanik der späteren Griechen, Berggold, p. 98
- Löw, Immanuel (1881), Aramäische Pflanzennamen, Engelmann
- Hanuš, Lumír O.; Řezanka, Tomáš; Dembitsky, Valery M.; Moussaieff, Arieh (2005), "Myrrh - Commiphora chemistry", Biomed. Papers, 149 (1): 3–28, doi:10.5507/bp.2005.001, PMID 16170385
- Dioscorides (2000) [60]. "Balsamon". De Materia Medica. Translated by Osbaldeston, Tess Anne. Johannesburg: Ibidis Press. p. 1.18. ISBN 978-0-620-23435-1. Archived from the original on 24 September 2014.
