= Khirbet Mazin =

Archeological site in Israel

Coordinates: 31.6818°N 35.4425°E

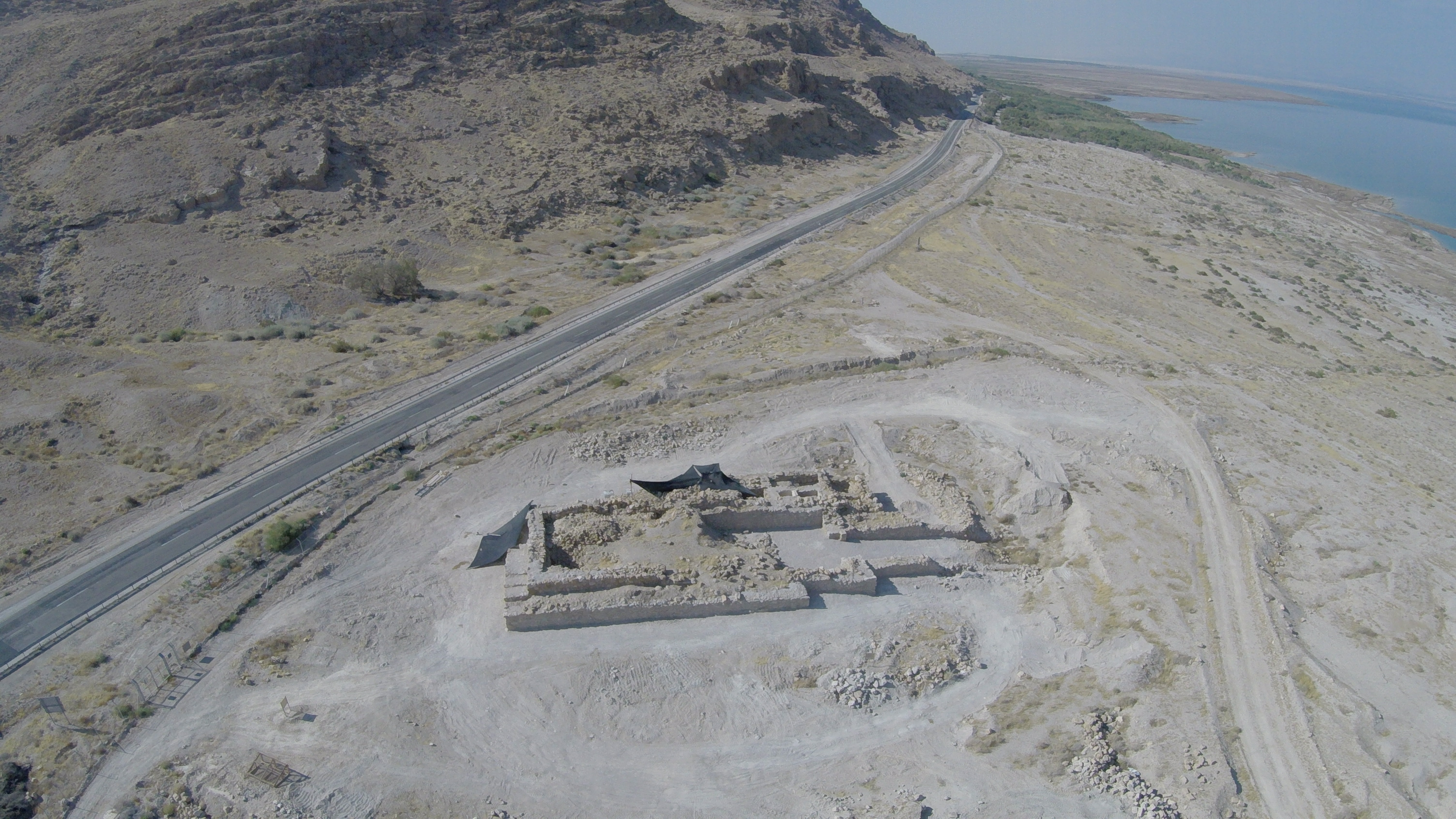
Khirbat Mazin (Metzad Kidron)

Khirbet Mazin (Hebrew: חורבת מזין), Hebrew name: Metzad Kidron (Hebrew: מצד קדרון) is an archaeological site on the northwestern shore of the Dead Sea. It is situated on the inlet of Wadi Mazin north of Kidron stream by the northwest shore of the Dead Sea.

Mazin is located in the southern part of Ein Feshkha nature reserve.

== Name ==
The site was called Khirbet Mazin by the first archaeologists after the name of a nearby wadi, Wadi Mazin. It was later called Qasr el-Rubai and identified with Qasr el-Yahud or Khirbet el-Yahud.

"Metzad Kidron" literally means "stronghold by Kidron" in Hebrew.

== History ==
=== Iron Age ===
The older part of ruins date to the end of the First Temple Period according to the 8th - 7th centuries BCE Israelite pottery found there.

=== Hasmonean period ===
Khirbet Mazin (Metzad Kidron) consists of the ruins of a fortress and anchorage. The fortress was enlarged and a dry dock was added during the Hasmonean times as part of their policy to rule the Dead Sea shores. Bronze coins and scraps from a shipwreck were founds outside of the anchorage.

According to Ehud Netzer, the site served as an anchorage for up to four royal boats (with an assumed length of 14 m) and was protected by the guards stationed in the tower.

Thousands of bronze coins of Alexander Jannaeus were found in the 2001 survey on the shore near Khirbet Mazin. The port facilities were probably built here during his reign, so that, coming from Jerusalem, one could sail over the Dead Sea to the seaside resort of Ayn al-Zara (ancient Callirrhoe) on the opposite shore, and from there ascend to the fortress of Machaerus.

== See also ==
- Ain el-Ghuweir
- Levantine archaeology
