= Nigel Groom =

British historian (1924–2014)

Nigel Groom OBE (April 26, 1924 – March 5, 2014) was a British Arabist, historian, author, soldier, counter-espionage officer in MI5 and perfume expert. He was a noted expert on the pre-Islamic history of the Arab world.

== Biography ==
Educated at Haileybury and Magdalene College, Cambridge, Groom served in the British Indian Army during the Second World War and fought in the Burma Campaign. Joining the Colonial Office after the war ended, he was posted to the Aden Protectorate in January 1948 and soon found himself in Bayhan as political agent, replacing Peter Davey, who had been killed in a gunfight. During his time in Bayhan he assisted in the construction of the first primary school and introduced the first motor car.

In 1950 he was posted to Dhala and moved to Aden in 1952, where he was Assistant Chief Secretary. From 1958-1962 he was based outside the Arabian Peninsula for the first time in his colonial career, moving to Nairobi in Kenya.

Groom joined the Security Service in 1962. His obituary in the journal of the British-Yemeni Society notes he was 'too discreet and too modest' to discuss this aspect of his career, but his contribution was noted with the award of an OBE in 1974.

== Published works ==
- Nigel Groom (30 June 1997). The New Perfume Handbook. Springer. ISBN 978-0-7514-0403-6.
- Nigel Groom. Parfums (in French). Éditions Solise (1999). ISBN 978-2876773981.
- Nigel Groom, Perfume: The Ultimate Guide to the World's Finest Fragrances 1999, Running Press Book Publishers ISBN 9780762406067
- Nigel Groom, Sheba Revealed: A Posting to Bayhan in the Yemen 2002, Arabian Publishing Ltd ISBN 9781900404310

== Personal life ==
Groom’s wife died in 2009; he was survived by a son and a daughter.

== Honours ==
- Officer of the Most Excellent Order of the British Empire - 1974
