= Qumran cemetery =

Archaeological site in the West Bank

Coordinates: 31°44′27″N 35°27′38″E

The Qumran cemetery is in eastern Qumran, an archaeological site in the West Bank, a part of Palestine which is under Israeli occupation. It is a large area leading to a descent from which four finger-like ridges point eastward. On these ridges more tombs are located. The current estimate of tombs in the cemetery is over 1100. The largest section, that on the plateau proper, has two east-west paths which divide it into three parts. There are also two small cemeteries near Qumran, one ten minutes' walk north of the main cemetery and one to the south, on the other side of Wadi Qumran.

== Excavation ==
The cemetery at the Qumran site is said to be a unique cemetery because how all of the graves differ from each other in one way or another. The characteristics of some graves point towards one tradition, while other characteristics point towards another. This makes it very difficult to determine to whom all the skeletons belong. There are up to 1,200 graves, found throughout all six cemeteries: the primary cemetery, the three extensions of the primary, the north cemetery (about 10 minutes away from the primary cemetery) and one south of Wadi Qumran. Despite the large number of tombs present in the cemeteries, Roland de Vaux only excavated 43 graves, while Solomon H. Steckoll examined ten. and Broshi and Eshel three, However, excavation of Jewish burials has been halted. Of de Vaux's 43 tombs, forty skeletons were fit to examine. Twenty-two of these are now in Germany (Collectio Kurth) and eighteen are in French institutions (Musee de l’Homme, Paris and Ecole Biblique, Jerusalem).

The majority of the graves are aligned very neatly with the heads to the south and the feet to the north. Within the southern extension of the primary cemetery, there are also some graves with the head to the east and their feet to the west. The graves themselves are made seen through the piling of field stones on top in an oval shape. Some have larger stones at the head, some at the feet. The graves are dug straight down with the depth ranging from 0.8 meter to 2.5 meters. At the bottom of the graves, is a small cavity, or a loculi. Here the body is laid. From there the body is protected by a stone or clay brick, meant to act as a cap. The bodies themselves are laid on their backs in solitude, or in some cases with a second body. Some of the bodies were buried in coffins, while others merely wrapped in shrouds. They were buried with no possessions except for a minimal amount that had some second temple period pottery buried with them at their feet and some were found with jewelry.

== Bedouin Intrusion ==
Most theories suggest that the bodies were from the second temple period. There are some theories that many of the graves belong to or were borrowed by Muslim Bedouins, considering Bedouins still inhabit that area. Bedouin are known to intrude on other communities cemeteries, so it would not be unusual if they did so at the Qumran location. Part of excavating the graves is to figure out which grave consists of whom.

Some characteristics or occurrences that support that the grave may be occupied by a Bedouin opposed to a second temple period being are as follows:

- The graves pointing from east to west. Within Islam tradition, Muslims always face east within all of their ritual, including prayer, worship and burial after death. This is because their most sacred site, the Ka’ba, is located in Mecca, which is traditionally thought to be in the east. When laid to rest the dead are believed to face the direction of the Ka’ba by being buried with the heads facing east. However, Mecca is actually south-southeast of the cemetery. The southern extension of the primary cemetery consists of graves pointing east.
- Buried with possessions. Bedouins have been known to bury their dead with the deceased’s possessions. At the Qumran cemetery, only a few graves were found with possessions such as jewelry and other jewels. Seeing as Bedouins would be the minority at the cemetery, this would explain why there are so little graves with items found with the bodies. Also the community that lived in the Qumran ruins practiced poverty so they would have no need or want for possessions like jewels.
- Multiple bodies in one grave. Along with intruding the cemetery, Bedouins have been known to intrude in actual graves. During excavation, archaeologists have discovered graves that were reopened and had a second body placed in it. In the case of grave 16, it had two skeletons in it. The first body, which was buried first, was found in the cavity of the grave. The second body was found just at the bottom of the grave. What implies that they were buried at separate times was how the first body was clearly disturbed. Also, found on both skeletons is a layer of decayed clay. This was obviously from the cap, as there was not one found when the grave was open. Other graves had their caps fall apart as well but not to this point. It is clear that the cap was handled after an extended period of time, when the second body was put in the grave.
- Separate cemeteries and extensions. The primary cemetery has all of the graves aligned very neatly. Why would the original users of the cemetery suddenly start separate cemeteries with less organization? The Bedouin wanted to bury their people in the dry terrain so they imposed on the primary cemetery. What they did not want though was for their people to be next to the tainted and impure, so they buried them off to the side and in their own traditional way.
- Remains of females and children. According to many sources, including Josephus, Pliny the elder, and Philo, the community in Qumran was composed of celibate males. They remained in existence by adopting the sons of other men, and through an initiation process to accept others into the community. There were supposedly no women; not even for procreation. However, remains of women and children have been recovered from the cemetery. There are many hypotheses for this issue in particular. Some involving the Bedouins and others involving outside knowledge on the Essenes and the Qumran community. Of course there is thought that many of the women were of Bedouin origins, as many of the women and children were found in the cemetery extensions and not the primary cemetery.

== Other cemeteries ==
For many years after the examination of the cemetery, Qumran's tombs were considered unique, as no similar examples had been found. However, more recently a number of cemeteries have yielded single north-south shaft tombs. The small cemetery at Ein el-Ghuweir, 13 kilometers south of Qumran, produced 18 shaft burials of which 13 had a north-south orientation, four were nearly so, and the last was east-west. There were twelve men and six women. The archaeologist believed he had found another settlement of the same sect he thought was at Qumran. Further south, the cemetery at Hiam el-Sagha contains twenty north-south tombs, mostly north-south and two were examined. One held a 3–4-year-old child and the other a 25-year-old man. Shaft tombs have been found in Jerusalem, one at Talpiot, another at Mamila, and at Beth Zafafa around 25 tombs were found. Hachlili states, "The tombs at Jerusalem (and Hiam el-Sagha) show no real proof that they are Jewish graves, except for their considerable similarity in form to the Qumran burials."

In 1996 and 1997 a rescue excavation was carried out at Khirbet Qazone near the southern end of the Dead Sea in Jordan. This site has an estimated 3,500 tombs, mostly looted, all with the same characteristics as the Qumran graves. Twenty-three undisturbed burials were examined. These Qumran-type tombs held Nabataeans.
