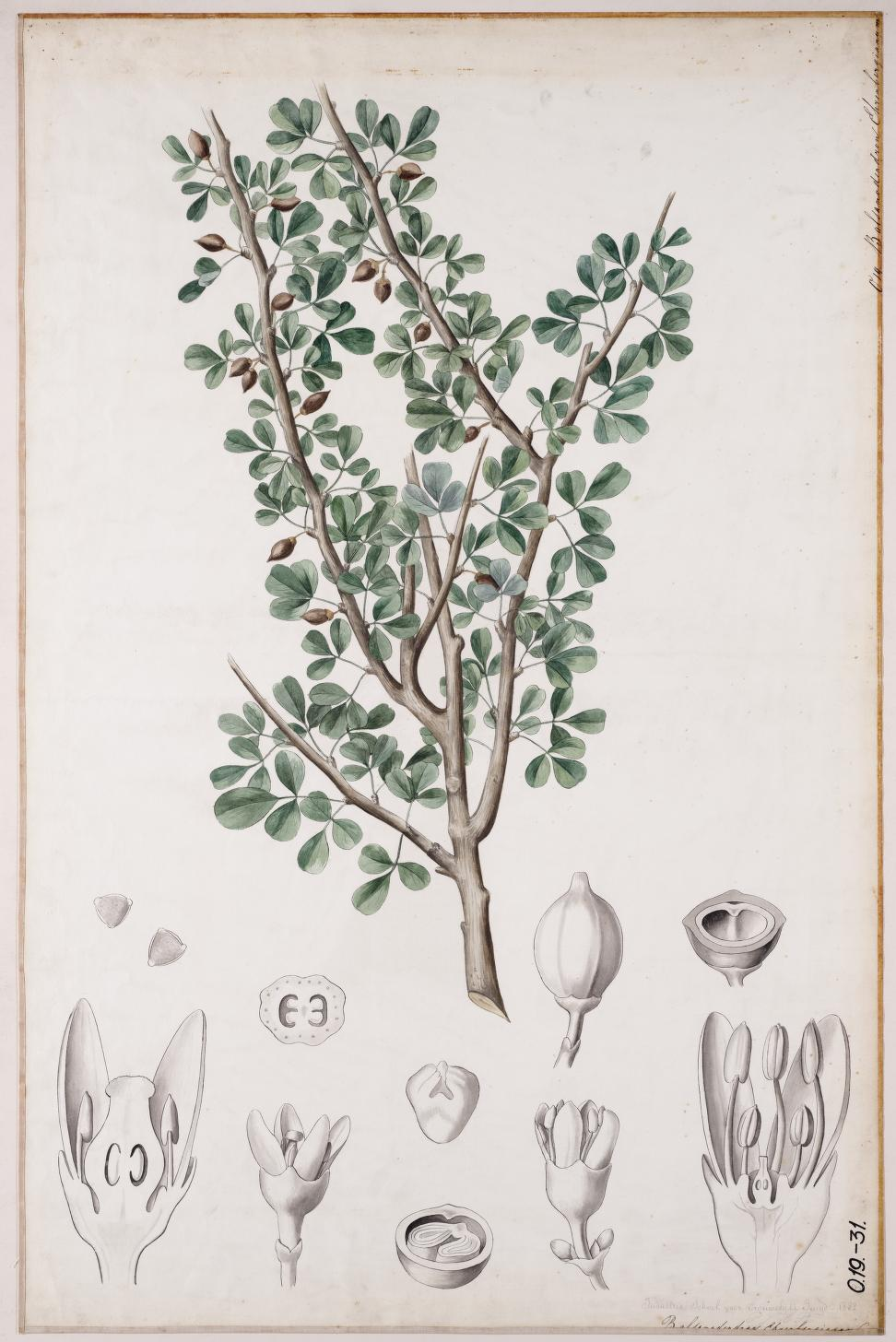

Scientific classification
- Kingdom: Plantae
- Clade: Tracheophytes
- Clade: Angiosperms
- Clade: Eudicots
- Clade: Rosids
- Order: Sapindales
- Family: Burseraceae
- Genus: Commiphora
- Species: C. gileadensis

Binomial name
- Commiphora gileadensis (L.) C.Chr.

Synonyms
- Amyris gileadensis L.; Amyris opobalsamum L.; Balsamea gileadensis (L.) Oken; Balsamea meccanensis Gled.; Balsamea opobalsamum Baill.; Balsamodendrum ehrenbergianum O.Berg; Balsamodendrum gileadense (L.) Kunth ex DC.; Balsamodendrum opobalsamum (L.) Kunth ex DC.; Balsamus libanotus Stackh.; Balsamus meccanensis Stackh.; Balsamus theophrasti Stackh.; Commiphora opobalsamum (L.) Engl.

= Commiphora gileadensis =

Species of flowering plant

Commiphora gileadensis, the Arabian balsam tree, is a shrub species in the family Burseraceae growing in Saudi Arabia, Yemen, southern Oman, Sudan and in southeast Egypt where it may have been introduced. Other common names for the plant include balm of Gilead and Mecca myrrh, but this is due to historical confusion between several plants and the historically important expensive perfumes and drugs obtained from them.

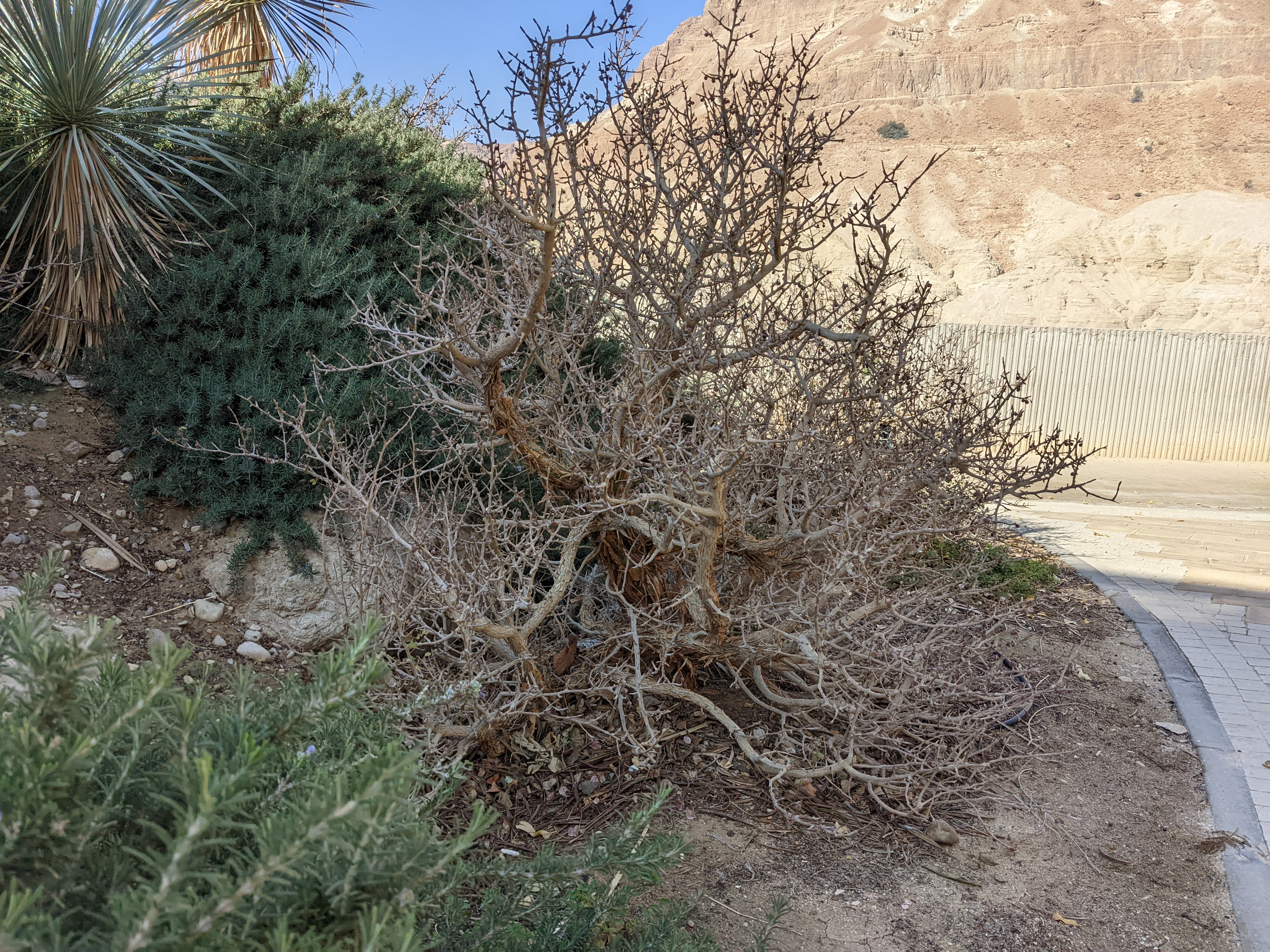
Commiphora gileadensis, identified by some as the ancient balm of Gilead, in the Botanical gardens of Kibutz Ein-Gedi.

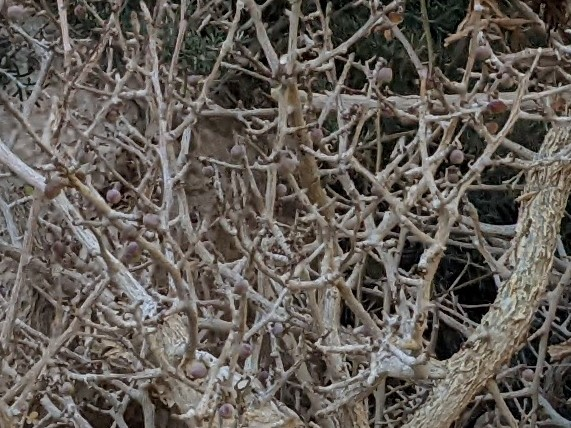
Branches and fruit of a Commiphora gileadensis shrub.

True balm of Gilead was very rare, and appears to have been produced from the unrelated tree Pistacia lentiscus. The Commiphora gileadensis species also used to include Commiphora foliacea, however it was identified and described as a separate species

== Use ==
=== Historical ===
The plant was renowned for the expensive perfume that was thought to be produced from it, as well as for supposed medicinal properties attributed to its sap, wood, bark, and seeds. Commiphora gileadensis is recognisable by the pleasant aroma arising from a broken twig or a crushed leaf.

=== Modern ===
The bark of the balsam tree is cut to cause the sap to flow out. This soon hardens, and has a sweet smell that quickly evaporates. The hardened resinous gum is chewed, is said to taste either like a lemon or like pine resin, and it is also burned as incense. It is boiled with water to make a type of tea common in the Hejaz region.

== Description ==
Depending on where Commiphora gileadensis is growing, it can vary in size, ranging from a small-leaved shrub to a large-leaved tree usually up to 4 m (13.1 ft) tall. It is rarely spiny, bark peeling or flaking when cut and exuding a pleasant smelling resin. Its leaves alternate on short condensed side shoots, pinnate with 3-5 leaflets. The leaflets are oblong, 5–40 millimetres (0.20–1.57 in) long and 3–35 millimetres (0.12–1.38 in) wide with acute tips and are thinly hairy. The flowers are red, sub-sessile and the plant has 1-5 of them on short condensed side shoots amongst the leaves. The fruits are dull red and marked with four longitudinal white stripes, one-seeded and splitting into 2–4 valves.
