= Yizhar Hirschfeld =

Israeli archaeologist

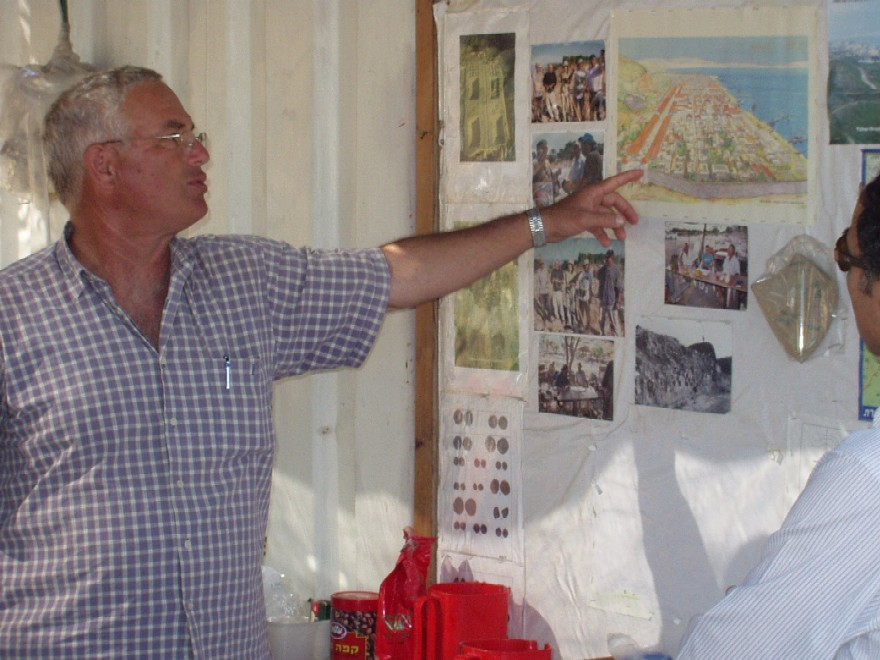
Prof. Hirschfeld in Old Tiberias 2005 season excavation

Yizhar Hirschfeld (Hebrew: יזהר הירשפלד; 1950 – 16 November 2006) was an Israeli archaeologist studying Greco-Roman and Byzantine archaeology. He was an associate professor at the Hebrew University of Jerusalem and director of excavations at a number of sites around Israel, including Ramat Hanadiv, Tiberias, and Khirbet ed-Deir. He also published a book on the archaeology of Qumran in which he proposed an assessment of the site that was contrary to prevailing views.

Professor Hirschfeld was born at Kibbutz Beth Keshet in Israel in 1950. He was already working on an excavation site in 1974 at Emmaus where he acted as excavation and survey director. From 1984 to 1987 he directed digs at Ramat HaNadiv. He received his doctorate at the Hebrew University Institute of Archaeology in 1987 and the following year he was awarded a Rothschild fellowship. He returned to Ramat Hanadiv in 1989, the year he also started work on excavations at Tiberias. In 1998, he was appointed as associate professor at the Hebrew University.

From 1996–2002 Hirschfeld directed excavations at a site on a terrace overlooking Ein Gedi, which consisted of a series of small dwellings. His analysis led him to conclude that "[a]ll features of the site—its location above Ein Gedi, simplicity, and unique nature—conform to Pliny the Elder's (d. 79 A.D.) famous passage on the Essenes". His proposal on the site (compare Aharoni 1958 BIES) has found little acceptance among archaeologists.

The experience he gained working on Greco-Roman period rural settlements gave him the background to write his controversial book Qumran In Context (2004), in which he concluded on morphological grounds that Qumran was "a Judean manor house" (and thus not the home of Essenes).

== Hirschfeld on the internet ==
- Ein Gedi 1998
- List of publications

Articles from Liber Annuus:

- The Monastery of Chariton. Survey and Excavations Plates
- Qumran in the Second Temple Period. Reassessing the Archaeological Evidence Plates
- En-Gedi: “A Very Large Village of Jews” Plates

== Qumran in Context ==
- The publisher's presentation
- Steven Bowman. Review. H-Judaic, H-Net Reviews. June 2005
- Jodi Magness. Review and a review of the Magness review
