= God on the Winged Wheel coin =

4th-century BCE coin which may depict Yahweh

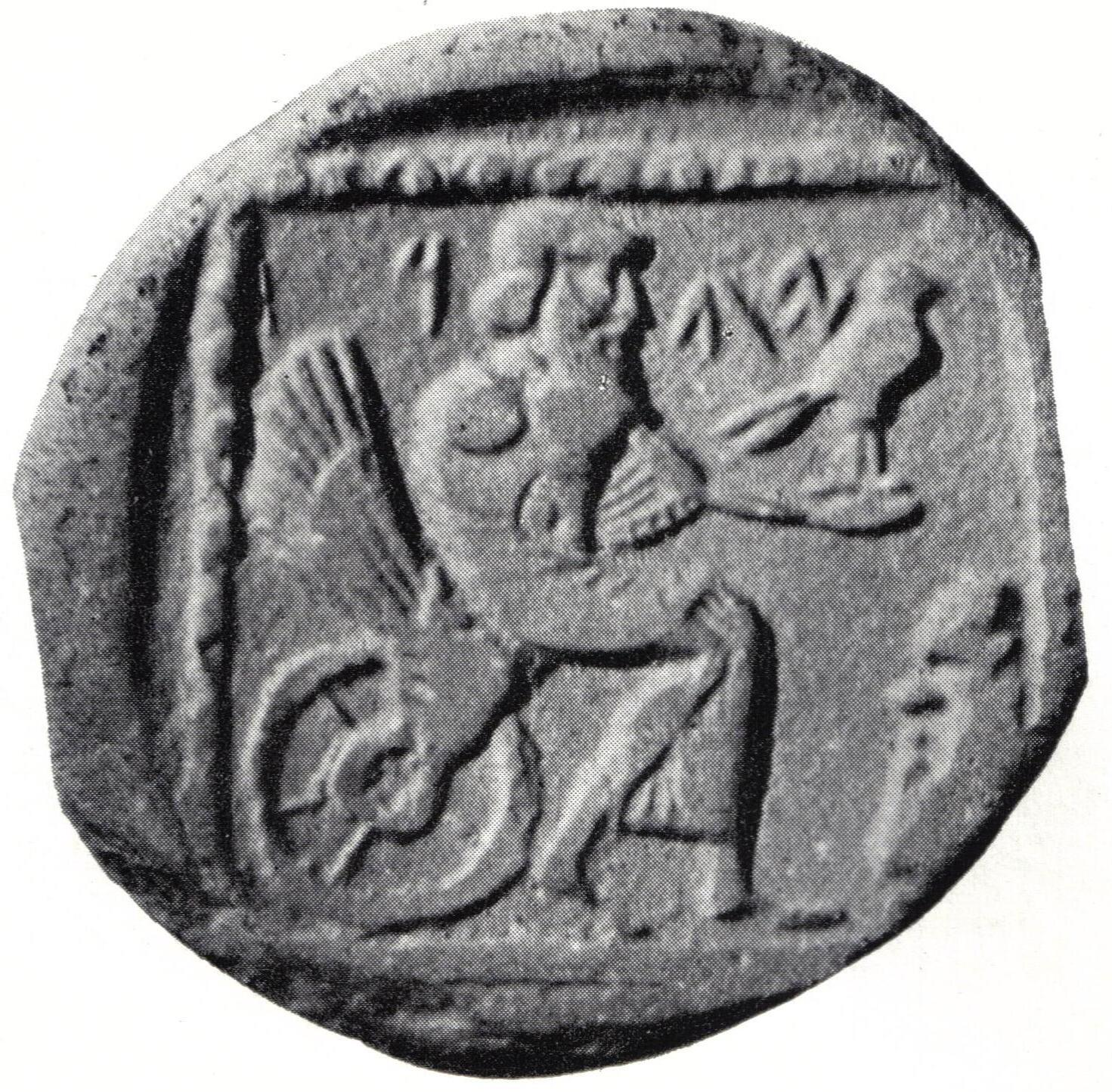
God on the Winged Wheel coin

The God on the Winged Wheel coin is a 4th-century BCE Achaemenid silver drachma known to scholars since 1814, and of disputed provenance. The coin features a depiction of a deity seated on a winged wheel, which some scholars considered to be "the only known representation" of Yahweh, while other scholars hold that its iconography fits better with Zeus.

The coin is housed in the British Museum with ID number TC,p242.5.Pop. It is referred to in Levantine numismatics as the "British Museum drachma".

== Description ==
The drachma weighs 3.29 grams, and measures 15 mm (0.59 in) in diameter.

=== Reverse ===
The reverse side shows a seated bearded figure, holding a bird (possibly a falcon), and sitting on a winged wheel. Above the figure, three Phoenician letters are visible, which have been read variously as 𐤉𐤄𐤃 "YHD" (i.e. Yehud), 𐤉𐤄𐤅 "YHW" (i.e. Yahweh) or 𐤉𐤄𐤓 "YHR".

The reverse figure has been described as a "God on the Winged Wheel". An early theory suggested that the figure might represent Yahweh, which would make this drachma a unique example of an anthropomorphic depiction of the Hebrew deity. This interpretation is controversial given the aniconism in Judaism, and other archeological finds represent the symbol of Yahweh as a winged disk. Scholars have also proposed that the seated figure may represent a syncretic deity influenced by both Eastern and Greek traditions. The falcon and seated posture are reminiscent of depictions of Zeus, while the winged wheel may reflect the Persian iconography of Ahura Mazda. A similar winged wheel depiction can be found in Hellenized Eastern art depictions of Triptolemus, though he is depicted as a youth and not bearded.

Shenkar notes that because of the coin's weight, which is not shekel weight, and the Achaemenid style, it is more likely Samarian, than Philistine or Judaean. He points out that the Samaritans identified Yahweh with Zeus Hellenius and according to Josephus, were a colony of Persians and Medes.

=== Obverse ===
The obverse side is the three-quarter profile of a bearded man wearing a Corinthian helmet. The identity of this figure has been the subject of much debate, with various suggestions ranging from a Greek god like Ares, to a Persian satrap or general, to a local Judean or Philistine figure. One possibility suggested by Ya'akov Meshorer was Bagoas the governor under Artaxerxes II, while Dan Barag instead suggested Bagoas the general under Artaxerxes III.

== Forge God ==
Scholar Gérard Nissim Amzallag, from the Ben-Gurion University, has posited that Yahweh was originally portrayed as a fire deity, associated with volcanic activity and metallurgy, and that the Winged God doesn't represent Zeus, but Hephaestus (being his counterparts the Egyptian Ptah, who was considered the Creator; the Roman Vulcanus; the Cretan Velchanos, etc.). Amzallag explains that Gods of metallurgy in the past (Bronze Age) were revered not only as the Gods of weapons, but also Gods of creation.

Amzallag also talks about how the dracma of the Winged God is similar to the vase painting of Hephaestus returning to Olympus, from his exile on the shores of the Oceanus, riding a winged chariot-car or chair. The chair is decorated with the heads, wings and tail of a crane. The god carries a double-headed smith's mallet.

== Provenance ==
The coin first came to scholarly attention in 1814, when it was included in a catalog of coins in the British Museum. Scholars attributed the coin's origin as Gaza, but its precise provenance is unknown.

When first published in 1814, the coin was described as bearing Phoenician text, largely due to its stylistic similarities with Phoenician coinage from cities such as Tyre and Sidon. Early numismatists classified the coin as Philisto-Arabian, based on its artistic affinities with coins from Philistia, a coastal region under Persian control. Scholars noted that Philistine coinage from cities like Gaza and Ashdod often incorporated Greek and Persian elements. However, the three-letter inscription on the reverse remained a point of contention, as it did not align with typical Philisto-Arabian coinage. The most significant reclassification came in the 1930s when Israeli archaeologist Eleazar Sukenik proposed that the letters were "YHD" and referred to the Persian province of Judea, shifting possible attribution of the coin to Judea. This reading, along with the discovery of additional coins bearing the same inscription, led to the hypothesis that the drachma was the earliest known examples of Yehud coinage. Despite this reclassification, debate over the coin's exact origin continues, with some scholars suggesting that it could have been minted in neighboring regions such as Philistia or Samaria.

Chemical analysis of the drachma has provided further insights into its origin. X-Ray Fluorescence (XRF) testing revealed that the coin is composed of 93% silver and 6% copper, a composition consistent with other coins from Samaria and Philistia during the same period. This metallurgical profile, combined with the coin's stylistic features, suggests that it may have been minted in Samaria or Philistia, rather than Judea.

== Bibliography ==
- Combe, Taylor (1814). Veterum populorum et regum numi qui in Museo Britannico adservantur (in Latin). Typis Ricardi et Arthuri Taylor.
- Six, Jan Pieter [in Italian] (1877). "OBSERVATIONS SUR LES MONNAIES PHÉNICIENNES". The Numismatic Chronicle and Journal of the Numismatic Society. 17. Royal Numismatic Society: 177–241. ISSN 2054-9172. JSTOR 42680983.
- Ernest Babelon 1910. Traité des monnaies grecques et romaines II.2. Paris.
- Pilcher, Edward John, 1908. A Coin of Gaza and the Vision of Ezekiel. Proceedings of the Society of Biblical Archaeology 30:45–51.
- Hill, George Francis (1914). A Catalogue of the Greek Coins in the British Museum: Catalogue of the Greek coins of Palestine (Galilee, Samaria, and Judaea) / by George Francis Hill. pale. Longmans.
- Langdon, Stephen Herbert (1931). The Mythology of All Races ... Semitic. Vol. 5. Boston.
- Sukenik, Eleazar (1934). "Paralipomena Palaestinensia I: The Oldest Coins of Judea". The Journal of the Palestine Oriental Society. 14. Palestine Oriental Society.: 178–182.
- Kienle, Helmut (1975). Der Gott auf dem Flügelrad: zu den ungelösten Fragen der "synkretistischen" Münze BMC Palestine S. 181, Nr. 29. Göttinger Orientforschung (in German). Harrassowitz. ISBN 978-3-447-01659-9.
- Gitler, Haim; Tal, Oren (2006). The Coinage of Philistia of the Fifth and Fourth Centuries BC: A Study of the Earliest Coins of Palestine. Collezioni numismatiche : materiali pubblici e privati. Edizioni Ennerre. ISBN 978-88-87235-30-2.
- Shenkar, Michael (2008). "The Coin of the 'God on the Winged Wheel'". Boreas (30–31): 14–23.
- Gitler, Haim . "The Earliest Coin of Judah” Israel Numismatic Research 6 (2011): 21–33
- Pyschny, Katharina (2021). "On Deserted Landscapes and Divine Iconography: Iconographic Perspectives on the Origins of YHWH". Entangled Religions. 12 (2). doi:10.46586/er.12.2021.9263. ISSN 2363-6696.
- Fontanille, Jean-Philippe; Gitler, Haim; Lorber, Catharine (2023). The Yehud Coinage: A Study and Die Classification of the Provincial Silver Coinage of Judah. Numismatic Studies and Researches. Israel Numismatic Society. ISBN 978-965-7849-00-2.
