= Royal Stoa =

Royal Stoa may refer to:

- Royal Stoa (Jerusalem)
- Stoa Basileios (literally "Royal Stoa"), Athens
