= Donald T. Ariel =

- דונלד צבי אריאל
- Born: Wantagh, New York
- Education: Brown University, Hebrew University of Jerusalem, Tel Aviv University
- Occupations: Numismatist, Archaeologist
- Known for: Head of the Coin Department of the Israel Antiquities Authority
- Notable work: The Coins of Herod (2011)
- Awards: Bank of Israel Award in Numismatics (1980), Kindler Prize (2013), Gloria Artis Medal for Merit to Culture, bronze medal (2017), AINA The Shekel prize (2020)

Donald Tzvi Ariel (Hebrew: דונלד צבי אריאל; born September 1954) is an American-born Israeli numismatist, archaeologist, and former head of the Coin Department of the Israel Antiquities Authority.

== Biography ==
Donald T. Ariel was born in Wantagh, New York. He received his BA (magna cum laude) from Brown University in 1976, his MA (with honors) from Hebrew University under the supervision of Dan Barag and Ya'akov Meshorer, and his Ph.D. at Tel Aviv University, under the supervision of Alla Kushnir-Stein.

== Career ==
Ariel helped excavate and analyze coins and jar handle stamps at numerous sites in Israel, including the Jerusalem and the City of David,, Qumran,, Nysa-Scythopolis,, Bethsaida, and Ascalon. Ariel became the head of the Israel Antiquities Authority coin collection in 1991.

Since its founding, Ariel has been the editor-in-chief of the journal Israel Numismatic Research. He has published more than 120 papers on numismatics and archaeology over his career.

== Published books ==
- Ariel, Donald T. (1990). Excavations at the City of David 1978-1985, Directed by Yigal Shiloh, Vol. II. Imported Stamped Amphora Handles, Coins, Worked Bone and Ivory, and Glass. pp. III–188.
- Ariel, Donald T. (2000). Excavations at the City of David 1978-1985, Directed by Yigal Shiloh, Vol. V: Extramural Areas. pp. III–169.
- Magen, Izchak; Ariel, Donald T.; Bijovsky, Rachel; Tzionit, Y; Sirkis, O (2004). The Land of Benjamin. Archaeological Staff Officer of Judea and Samaria. ISBN 978-965-406-159-9.
- Ariel, Donald Tzvi; Fontanille, Jean-Philippe (23 December 2011). The Coins of Herod: A Modern Analysis and Die Classification. Brill. ISBN 978-90-04-20801-8.
