= Institution of Municipal Engineers =

UK professional association

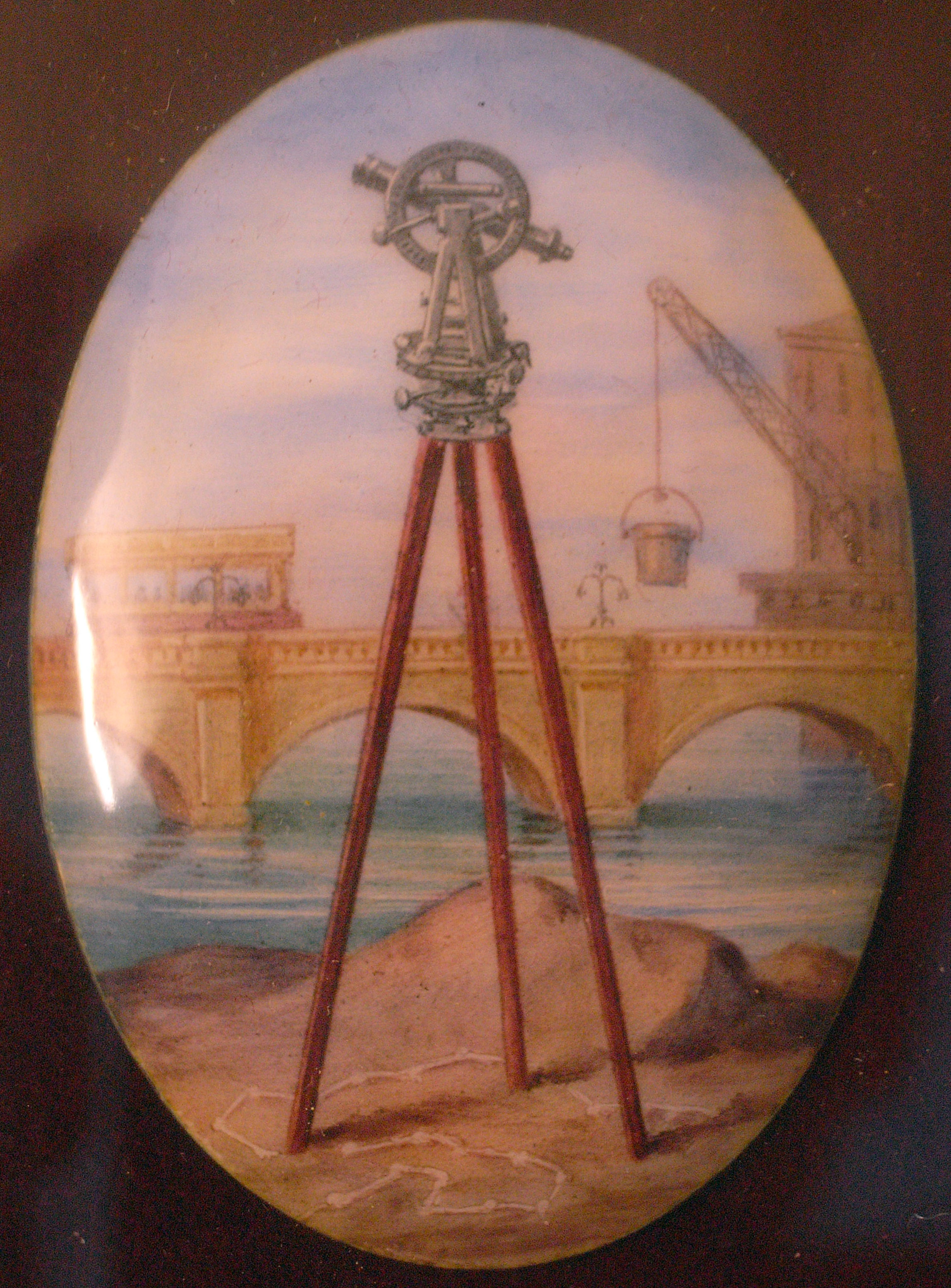
The original "jewel" from the centre of the Institution of Municipal Engineers presidential badge. This was in use from 1911-1931. It was replaced by the jewel as illustrated in the photograph below when the arms of the Institution were granted in 1931. The jewel and badge are held by the Institution of Civil Engineers.

The Institution of Municipal Engineers (IMunE) was a professional association for municipal engineers in the United Kingdom. Founded in 1873, the institution grew following the expansion in municipal engineering roles under the Public Health Act 1875 (38 & 39 Vict. c. 55). It was incorporated in 1890 and received a royal charter in 1948. The IMunE was a founding member of the Council of Engineering Institutions in 1964 and by the later 20th-century was responsible for examining most British building inspectors. The IMunE merged with the Institution of Civil Engineers in 1984.

== History ==
The Institution of Municipal Engineers has its origins in 1871 when the surveyor for West Ham, Lewis Angell, held discussions with other professionals about founding a society to promote the need for municipal engineers to work "according to principle and not policy". The Association of Municipal and Sanitary Engineers and Surveyors was founded in 1873, with Angell as its first president. The association's first conference was held in 1874 and was attended by Joseph Chamberlain, who was then mayor of Birmingham. This conference became an annual four-day event during which technical papers were presented and discussed by members.

There was a large increase in the number of municipal engineers in this period, particularly after the Public Health Act 1875 (38 & 39 Vict. c. 55) which required local authorities to appoint engineers with responsibilities for water supply, sewerage, waste disposal, street sweeping and general surveying. In 1886 the association introduced its first examinations, known as testamurs, the syllabus of which included the principles of building construction and the law. The membership expanded to include civil engineers and civil engineering surveyors following the Local Government Act 1888 which introduced county councils with responsibilities in these areas. Membership of the IMunE was not a pre-requisite for employment by a local authority, as such there was a wide variation in the competence of practising municipal engineers in this period.

The association was incorporated in 1890 and changed its name to the "Institution of Municipal and County Engineers" in 1908. Beginning in 1913 the institution published a monthly Journal of the Institution of Municipal and County Engineers; other publications included The Presentation of Evidence - a series of monologues by GS Short and the Proceedings of its annual conference. In 1922 the institution tightened its membership criteria, restricting admission to those who held an academic degree, membership of the Institution of Civil Engineers or who passed the testamur. The IMunE introduced an examination for building inspectors in 1937, though passing this was not mandatory to secure employment in the field.

In 1948 the institution received a royal charter and shortened its name to the "Institution of Municipal Engineers"; at the same time the testamur exam became the only means to secure membership. After receiving the charter the IMunE was able to award the title of chartered municipal engineer to members. In 1962 the institution introduced diplomas in traffic engineering and town planning; it later introduced a diploma in administration. The institution registered as a charity on 6 June 1963.

In 1964 the IMunE became a founder member of the Council of Engineering Institutions. By the following year it had 8,500 members, the majority of whom worked for local authorities in the UK or overseas. During this period it held more than 150 district-level meetings each year and maintained a scientific advisory service, library and number of science committees. The membership grew to 9,175 in 1967. The IMunE's headquarters were at 25 Eccleston Square in London.

By late 20th century the IMunE was responsible for examining the majority of building inspectors in the UK. It supported reform and modernisation in this area but opposed any relaxation in the requirement for examination.

== Merger ==
The IMunE merged with the Institution of Civil Engineers (ICE) in 1984. The IMunE abandoned its royal charter but retained its constitution for members then within the ICE. The IMunE continued within the ICE as the Association of Municipal Engineers (AME), with its journal Municipal Engineering continuing to be published as part of ICE Proceedings. The IMunE's registration as a charity ceased on 25 May 1993. The AME was discontinued in the early 2000s being replaced by a Municipal Engineering Expert Panel. This panel was discontinued in the late 2010s. The ICE continues as the UK representative body at the International Federation of Municipal Engineers. The ICE maintains the records of the IMunE, including the first minute book (from July 1871) and complete sets of minutes from 1921-77 and membership lists from 1873-1978. The publications of the IMunE are held in the ICE library.

== Heraldry ==
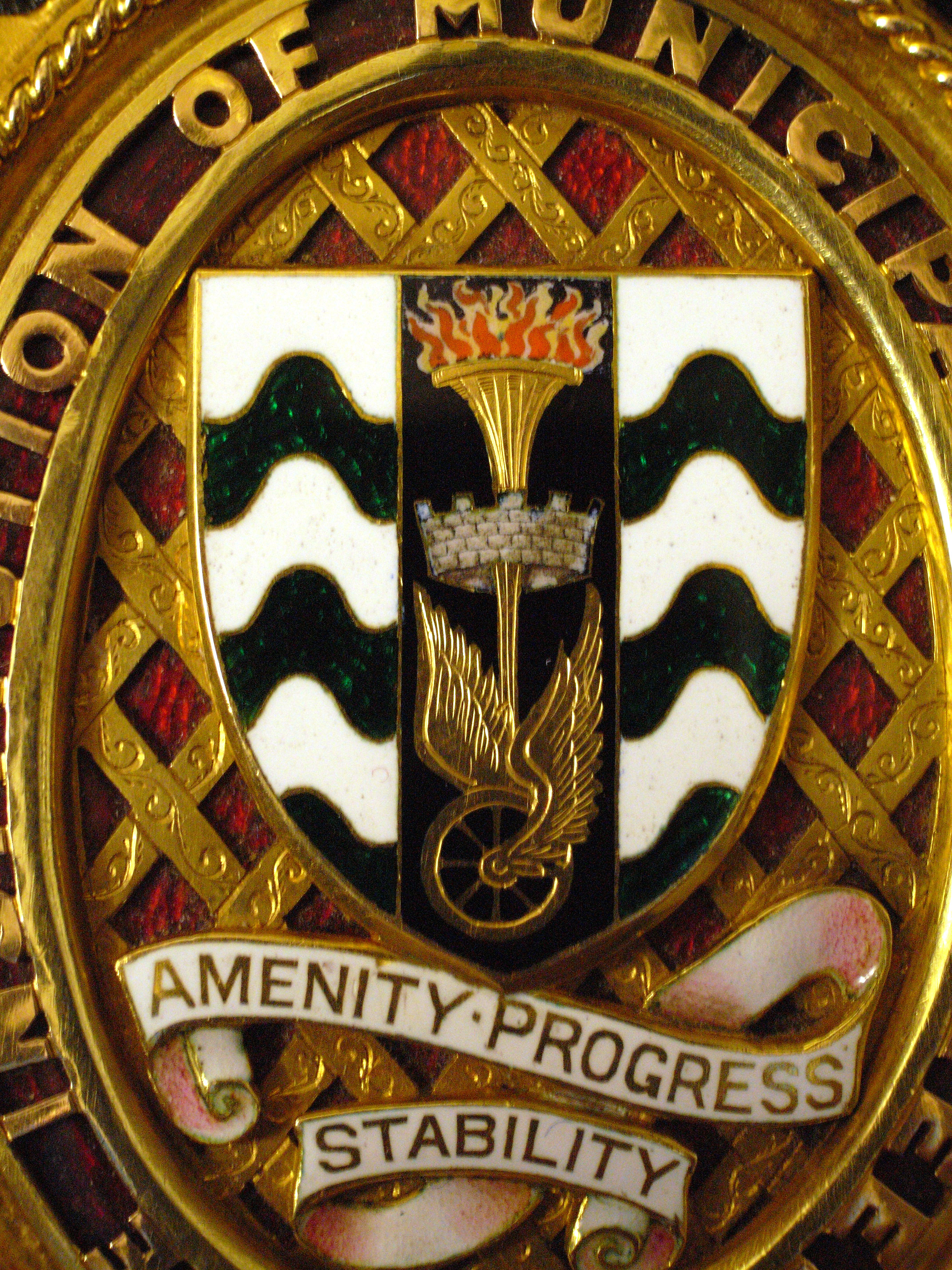
Institution of Municipal Engineers President's Badge (detail) showing the coat of arms

The Institution of Municipal and County Engineers was awarded heraldic arms in 1931, which it retained throughout its existence. Its blazon (formal description) is: "Barry wavy of six Argent and Vert, a Pale Sable, thereon in chief a Torch Or, firted, and enfiled with a Mural Crown proper, and in base a Winged Wheel Gold". The arms bore the motto "Amenity, Progress, Stability" in English.

The design of the arms represented the activities of its members:

- A green and white wavy field

- Green representing parks and open spaces
- White representing rivers and water supplies

- A black vertical dividing line representing highways and bridges
- A winged wheel representing traffic and machinery
- A torch representing education and public lighting
- A battlemented mural crown representing local government and building construction; gold coloured to represent the wealth generated by engineering works.
- The layout of the overall arms represented town planning
