= Chanuyot =

The temple shops or Hebrew plural hanuyot (חנויות) were buildings near the Temple in Jerusalem mentioned in the Babylonian Talmud (B.Shabbat 15a, B.Rosh Hashanah 31a; B.Avodah Zarah 8b). According to the Talmud the Sanhedrin relocated to the temple shops, hanuyot, at some point before the destruction of the Temple in 70 CE. The plural hanuyot is also the word for "shops" in modern Hebrew.

The hanuyot are to be distinguished from the temple treasury or grain storehouse (אוצר 'otsar) for the Temple in Jerusalem mentioned in the Hebrew Bible. The Talmud indicates that the hanuyot were where the Priests and Levites stored the accoutrements for the daily functioning of the Temple. The hanuyot consisted of a single room along the southern edge of the Mount, almost 1,000 feet (300 m) long and 105 feet (32 m) wide. Its single story was 100 feet (30 m) high. Mazar (1975) identifies the hanuyot with the Royal Stoa, a basilica erected by Herod the Great at the southern end of his expansion of the Temple Mount.

When the Roman government limited the powers of the Sanhedrin, ca. 30 CE, the Sanhedrin moved from their chambers inside the azarah (Chamber of Hewn Stone) to the hanuyot (Talmud Rosh ha-Shanah 31a).

The hanuyot were destroyed along with the Temple by the Romans in 70 CE. Unlike the Temple, which was completely destroyed, a significant portion of the hanuyot may have survived the destruction as the current Al-Aqsa Mosque includes rows of ancient Corinthian columns that clearly predate the Islamic architecture.

== See also ==
- Temple in Jerusalem
- Royal Stoa (Jerusalem)
