= Temple treasury =

Storehouse in the Hebrew Bible

The temple treasury was a storehouse (Hebrew אוצר 'otsar) first of the tabernacle then of the Jerusalem Temples mentioned in the Hebrew Bible. The term "storehouse" is generic, and also occurs later in accounts of life in Roman Palestine where the otzar was a tax-collector's grainhouse.

The first mention of the "treasury of the LORD" occurs in Joshua 6:19 where all the silver and gold vessels are consecrated to a "storehouse" which travelled with the tabernacle. Later, this was made permanent in the First Temple, till the treasury was pillaged by Nebuchadnezzar's army.

In the Second Temple, the treasury was used for storing the grain for the Levites. In Nehemiah and Zechariah, this became the subject of contention when Eliashib, grandson of Joshua the high priest, leased the storehouse to Tobiah the Ammonite. In the deutero-canonical 2 Maccabees 3:6, reference is made to "untold sums of money" held at the treasury in Jerusalem.

A related term, the korbanas, is found in the New Testament (Matthew 27:6) where the money of Judas Iscariot cannot be received into the temple "treasury", or κορβανᾶς korbanas, because it is "blood money". Josephus explains this term korbanas as the temple treasury – ton hieron thesauron, kaleitai de korbanas (War of the Jews 2.9.4; #175). Josephus says that Pontius Pilate used the korbanas to fund the construction of an aqueduct of about 400 stade, or 75 kilometers, and that this action incited the population to a riot.

The treasury storehouse is to be distinguished from the hanuyot or "shops" near the Temple into which the Sanhedrin relocated from 30 to 70 CE.
