= Royal Stoa (Jerusalem) =

Ancient basilica constructed by Herod the Great

- הסטיו המלכותי
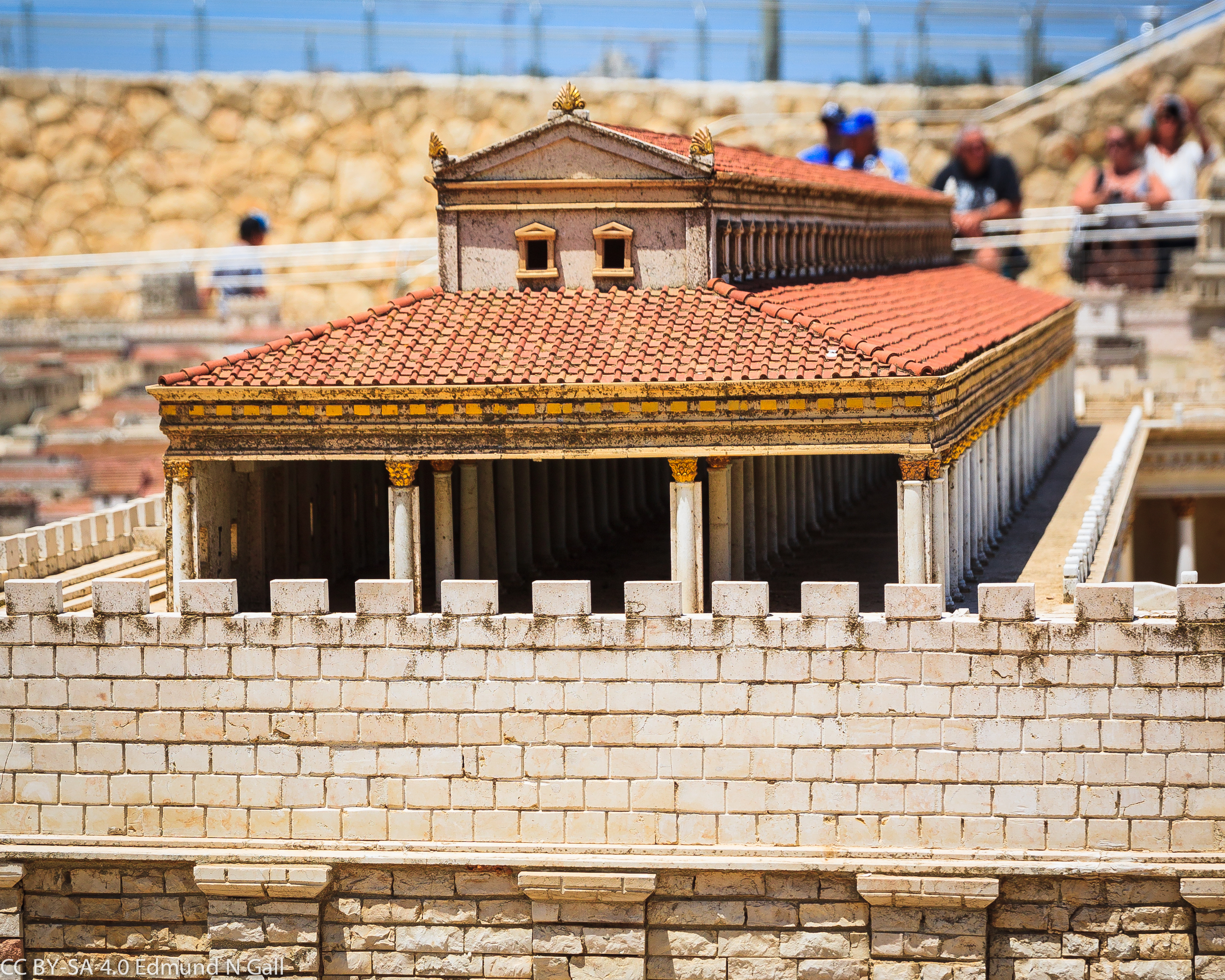
- Proposed reconstruction of the Royal Stoa at the Holyland Model of Jerusalem
- Interactive map of Royal Stoa
- 31°46′33.42″N 35°14′10.38″E
- Type: basilica
- Periods: Late Roman Republic, Early Roman Empire
- Location: Temple Mount, Jerusalem

History
- Built: First century BCE
- Built by: Herod the Great
- Abandoned: First century CE

Site notes
- Material: Stone
- Excavation dates: None
- Condition: Unexcavated
- Public access: Limited

The Royal Stoa (Hebrew: הסטיו המלכותי, romanized: Ha-stav ha-Malkhuti; also known as the Royal Colonnade, Royal Portico, Royal Cloisters, Royal Basilica or Stoa Basileia) was an ancient basilica constructed by Herod the Great during his renovation of the Temple Mount at the end of the first century BCE. Probably Herod's most magnificent secular construction, the three-aisled structure was described by Josephus as deserving "to be mentioned better than any other under the sun." The Royal Stoa overlooked Jerusalem's residential and commercial quarters, and at its southwestern corner was the place from which a ram's horn was blown to announce the start of holy days.

The Royal Stoa was destroyed by the Roman army during the sack of Jerusalem in 70 CE. Its site is currently inaccessible to archaeologists since it is occupied by the Al-Aqsa Mosque. However, artifacts from the Stoa have been recovered both from excavations at the foot of the platform and in secondary use in later constructions. This evidence has confirmed details given in the accounts of the historian Josephus, and has also allowed comparison of the Royal Stoa's decoration with that used in other, contemporaneous monumental buildings.

== History ==
=== Construction ===
Herod's reconstruction of the Second Temple was one of his principal building projects. Construction began during the last quarter of the first century BCE. It was both a monumental architectural feat and an important political achievement. Herod invested a great deal of effort in the expansion of the Temple platform, especially at its southern side where the Temple Mount descends into the Tyropoeon and Kidron valleys. This expansion along the southern edge of the esplanade served as a base upon which the Royal Stoa was erected. The building was basilical in form, but open on one side, which led it to being described as a portico, a stoa or cloisters in various sources. It was likely Herod's most magnificent secular edifice. The historian Josephus praised the Royal Stoa as "more worthy of mention than any other [structure] under the sun", and described the building in detail:

This cloister had pillars that stood in four rows one over against the other all along, for the fourth row was interwoven into the wall, which [also was built of stone]; and the thickness of each pillar was such, that three men might, with their arms extended, fathom it round, and join their hands again, while its length was 27 feet (Greek: πόδες), with a double spiral at its basis; and the number of all the pillars [in that court] was a hundred and sixty-two. Their chapiters were made with sculptures after the Corinthian order [...] These four rows of pillars included three intervals for walking in the middle of this cloister; two of which walks were made parallel to each other, and were contrived after the same manner; the breadth of each of them was 30 feet (Greek: πόδες), the length was 1 furlong (Greek: στάδιον), and the height 50 feet (Greek: πόδες); but the breadth of the middle part of the cloister was one and a half of the other, and the height was double, for it was much higher than those on each side; but the roofs were adorned with deep sculptures in wood, representing many sorts of figures. The middle was much higher than the rest, and the wall of the front was adorned with beams, resting upon pillars, that were interwoven into it, and that front was all of polished stone...

— Flavius Josephus, Antiquities of the Jews 15:410–420.

A basilica with four rows of columns running lengthwise, each made of 40 columns, the Royal Stoa thus contained three parallel aisles, with a central aisle measuring 14.8 metres (49 ft) in breadth and two flanking aisles measuring 9.9 metres (32 ft) in breadth each, for a total breadth of 35 metres (115 ft). Each column was approximately 1.5 metres (4.9 ft) in diameter and, according to Josephus, 30 feet (9.9 metres) tall. The central hall was twice as tall as the aisles, probably nearly 33 metres (108 ft) tall. Israeli archaeologist Ehud Netzer estimates the Royal Stoa was roughly 33 metres (108 ft) wide and 240 metres (790 ft) long, though Josephus wrote that the Royal Cloisters ran the entire length of the Southern Wall, which wall measures 922 feet (281 m). This distance was known to the Greeks as stadion (translated by others as "furlong").

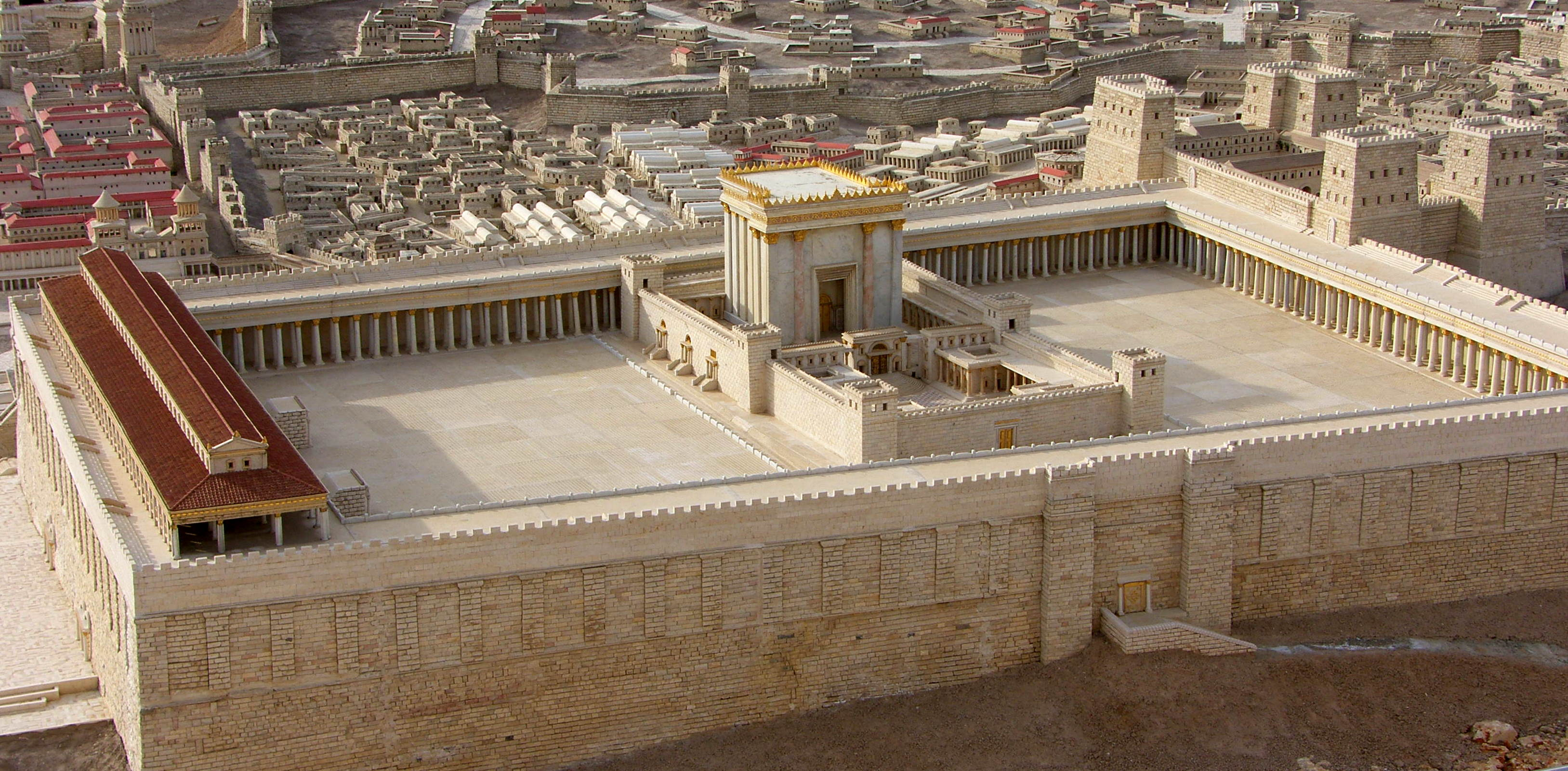
Model of the Herodian Temple Mount: Temple (center), Royal Stoa (left), and Antonia Fortress (right)

The central aisle had a higher ceiling than the side-aisles. Light was provided by clerestory windows in the upper part of the central hall. It is also possible that an apse stood at the eastern wall of the Stoa. Josephus describes the columns as Corinthian in style and Corinthian capitals have indeed been found in excavations along the mount's southern wall, as well as reused in later Roman, Byzantine and Islamic structures. The ceilings were ornamented with deeply cut wood-carvings while other parts of the interior were apparently covered with stucco. The southernmost row of columns was incorporated into the southern wall of the Temple mount, while the northern side opened onto the plaza in the middle of which stood the Temple. From the outside, the southern wall was distinguished from the retaining wall of the platform by a series of pilasters running along the length of the superstructure. The main entry to the Stoa from the city was via a monumental staircase which led up from the Tyropoeon Valley and then across Robinson's Arch, passing over the street and shops below.

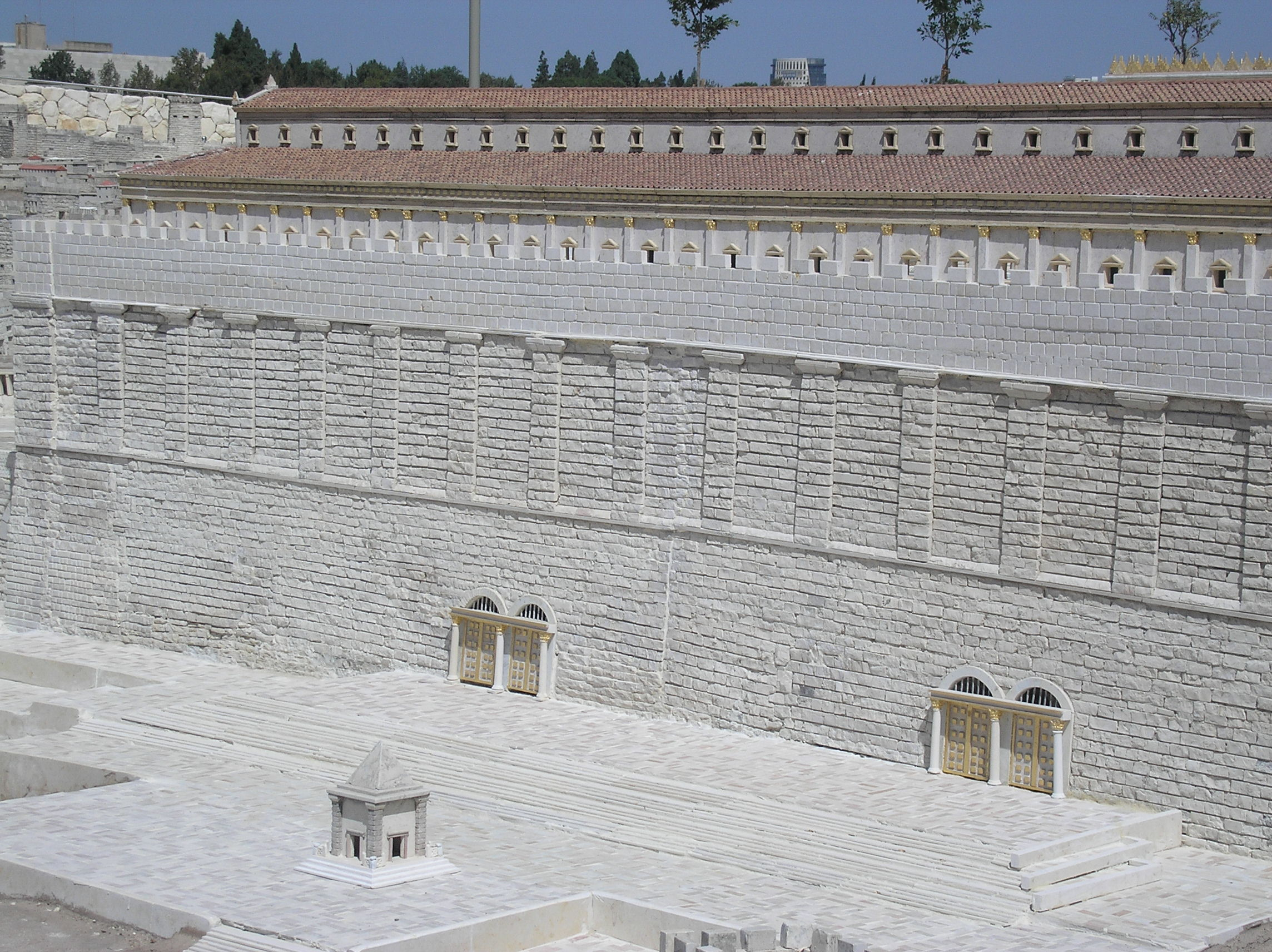
Southern Wall as depicted at the Holyland Model, showing the Huldah Gates and the Royal Stoa

The Royal Stoa was built upon the artificially raised portion of the Temple Mount platform. Arches underneath supported the columns of the Stoa, and provided service areas for the structures above. The Huldah Gates at the bottom of the southern wall led through corridors beneath the Stoa, rising to the Temple plaza, and served as the main entrance to the Temple compound for worshipers. Additional passages led to storage areas, and possibly provided secondary access to the Stoa and the Temple beyond. An arched overpass on the eastern side of the Temple Mount led to a gate which opened into the so-called Solomon's Stables just beneath the eastern end of the Stoa. It is widely assumed that at least part of this area was used as a storage area in conjunction with business conducted in the Stoa.

The expansion of the Temple Mount platform and the erection of the Royal Stoa required Herod's engineers to overcome the difficult topographic conditions. It was thus necessary to build 35 metres (115 ft) tall foundations above the slope of the Tyropoeon valley and equivalent 40 metres (130 ft) tall foundations above the Kidron. The great effort invested in the construction of the Royal Stoa is a testimony of its immense importance to Herod and his status on the Temple Mount. Unlike his predecessors, the Hasmonean kings who had also served as High Priests, Herod was not of the priestly caste and was therefore unable to participate in priestly rituals. A client king appointed by the Romans, lacking legitimacy and unpopular with his subjects, Herod had initiated the Temple reconstruction to win favour among the Jews, but was forbidden from even entering the inner sanctum of his crowning achievement. It was thus the monumental Royal Stoa which gave Herod his rightful status on the Mount, a showcase of his majesty and grandeur.

Today, the al-Aqsa Mosque is partially built over the site where once stood the Royal Cloisters, and now measures 56 metres (184 ft) in breadth. Archaeologist R.W. Hamilton wrote during excavations and repairs of the al-Aqsa Mosque between 1938 and 1942 that his team uncovered a marble pavement some 50 to 80 cm (20 to 31 in) beneath the current floor of the mosque and which pavement belonged to an earlier structure. Hamilton wrote that "some 19 m (62 ft) short of the present north wall of the mosque the bedding of the marble pavement came to an end," suggesting that the original structure measured 37 metres (121 ft) in breadth.

=== Purpose ===
Every major Roman city had a basilica which was used for banking, law courts, and other commercial transactions. In Jerusalem, the Royal Stoa was the center of this activity. In the forty years prior to the Great Revolt it served as the seat of the Sanhedrin, Judaism's supreme judicial court, which was moved from the Chamber of Stone to the "Shop" (Chanuyot in the Talmud), referring to the commercial activities conducted in the Stoa. A fragment of a monumental inscription found near the eastern Huldah gates below the Stoa refers to the Zeqenim (elders) and may indicate the Sanhedrin's meeting place near the gates or in the Stoa above.

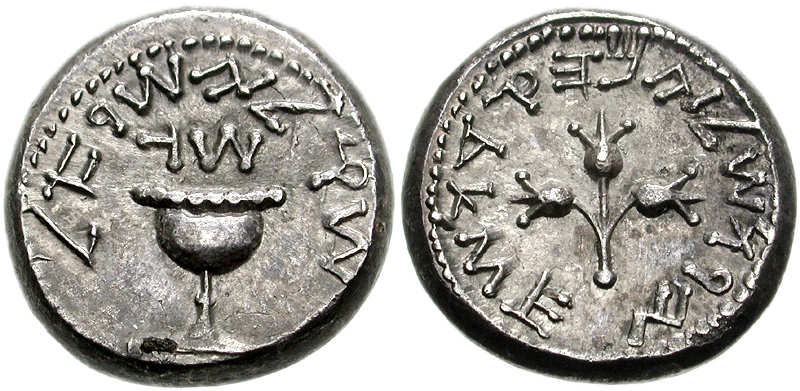
Silver shekel minted during the Great Revolt. The archaizing, paleo-Hebrew inscription reads: "Shekel of Israel" "Year 3" (obverse); "Jerusalem the Holy" (reverse)

This center of commercial activity within sight of the Temple was considered irreverent to many devout Jews. It was also a site of commerce related to the Temple ritual, where sacrificial doves could be bought and coins bearing prohibited images could be exchanged. It is therefore a likely location for Jesus' confrontation with the dove sellers and money changers which is related in chapter 21 of the Gospel of Matthew. Special coinage was used for sacred contributions and other purposes. The Israel Antiquities Authority's numismatist Donald T. Ariel has proposed that the Royal Stoa as the site for a mint, run by the priesthood. During the Great Revolt against Rome, this may have been the site where silver shekels were produced. The stoa's convenient proximity to the Temple's silver stores and the area's use for other commercial purposes argue for identification of the stoa as the location of minting operations. Other "Revolt" coinage was in base metal, and these may have been struck elsewhere in Jerusalem.

Above the basilica, either on a parapet or tower, was a place from which a trumpet or ram's horn would be blown to signal the start of the Sabbath and holy days. On the pavement below the southwest corner of the Royal Stoa complex, a piece of stone coping was found which bears a dedicatory inscription which reads "to the Place of Trumpeting". This location overlooked most of Jerusalem's neighborhoods, and the recovery of the inscription confirms that the southwest corner is the site where the trumpeting took place.

=== Destruction ===
And now the Romans, judging that it was in vain to spare what was round about the holy house, burnt all those places, as also the remains of the cloisters and the gates, two excepted; the one on the east side, and the other on the south; both which, however, they burnt afterward... The soldiers also came to the rest of the cloisters that were in the outer [court of the] temple, whither the women and children, and a great mixed multitude of the people, fled, in number about six thousand. But before Caesar had determined any thing about these people, or given the commanders any orders relating to them, the soldiers were in such a rage, that they set that cloister on fire; by which means it came to pass that some of these were destroyed by throwing themselves down headlong, and some were burnt in the cloisters themselves. Nor did any one of them escape with his life.

— Flavius Josephus, The Wars of the Jews 6:281–285.

The Great Revolt and the subsequent sacking of Jerusalem in 70 CE brought about the destruction of Herod's Temple, including the Royal Stoa, by members of the Roman X Fretensis, XII Fulminata, XV Apollinaris and V Macedonica legions under the command of emperor Vespasian's son Titus. It is likely that the stoa was modified during the initial phases of the revolt when the Temple Mount was fortified, first by Simon Bar Giora and then by John of Gischala. The main entry at Robinson's Arch was destroyed and towers built. Excavated remains of the Stoa provide evidence of its demise in a great fire. Chemical analysis of the remains has shown that some of the materials underwent transformations requiring a minimum temperature of 800 K (980 °F)—a result of sustained, high-temperature burning consistent with Josephus's account of destruction in a large conflagration. Some remains also contain the mineral apatite, a component of bone, though its origins, human or animal, are unknown.

== Temple Mount excavations ==
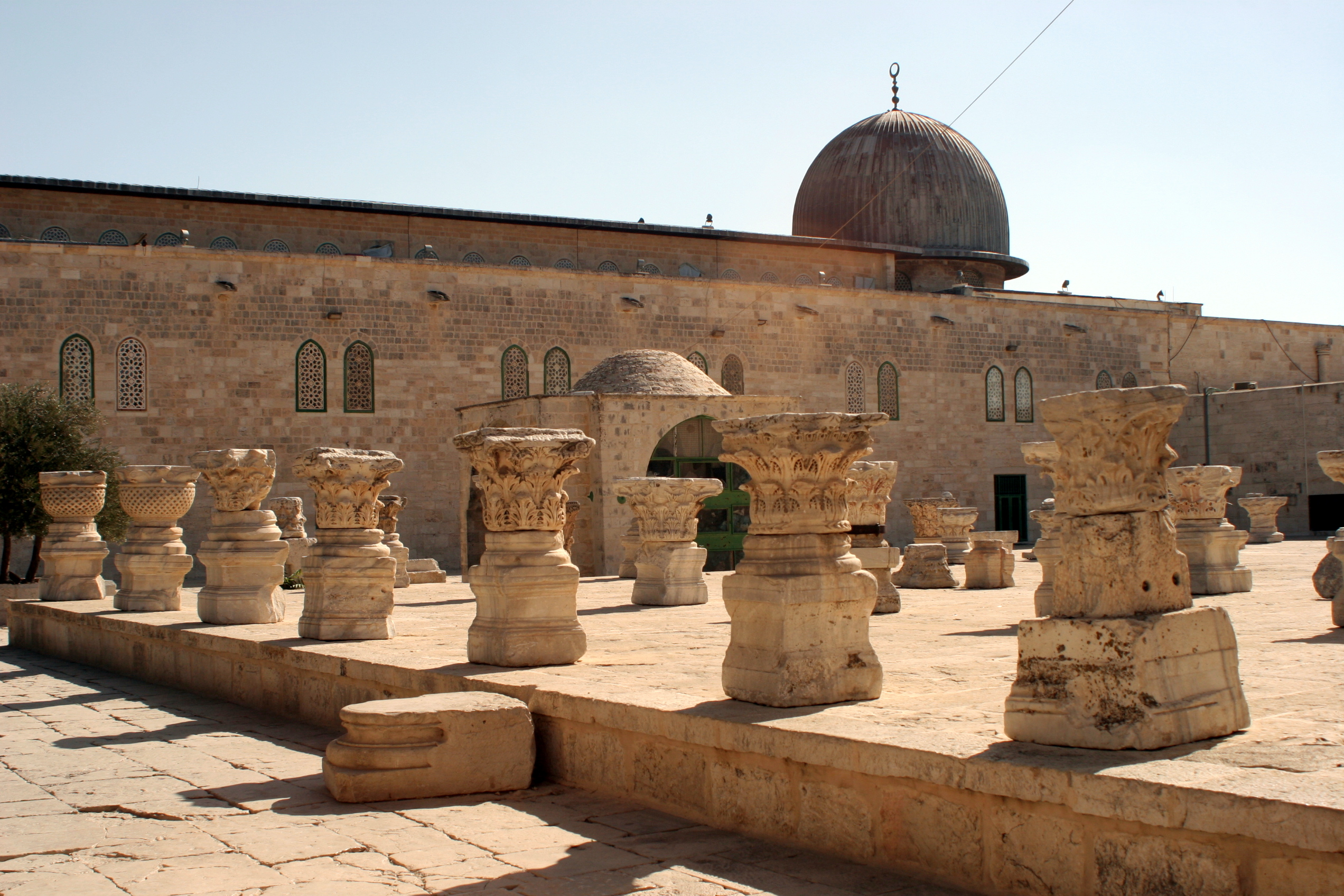
The former site of the Royal Stoa is now occupied by the Al-Aqsa Mosque

The site of the Royal Stoa is currently occupied by the Al-Aqsa Mosque, Islam's third-holiest shrine, and is therefore unavailable for archaeological exploration. Between 1968 and 1978, however, professor Benjamin Mazar of the Hebrew University of Jerusalem carried out excavations at the foot of the southern wall. These uncovered over 400 architectural fragments in the destruction debris below the site of the Stoa, some of which were incorporated in secondary use in later Byzantine and Umayyad construction. Despite their fragmentary nature, these provide some of the largest and richest Second-Temple era assemblages ever found, a testament to the splendor described by Josephus.

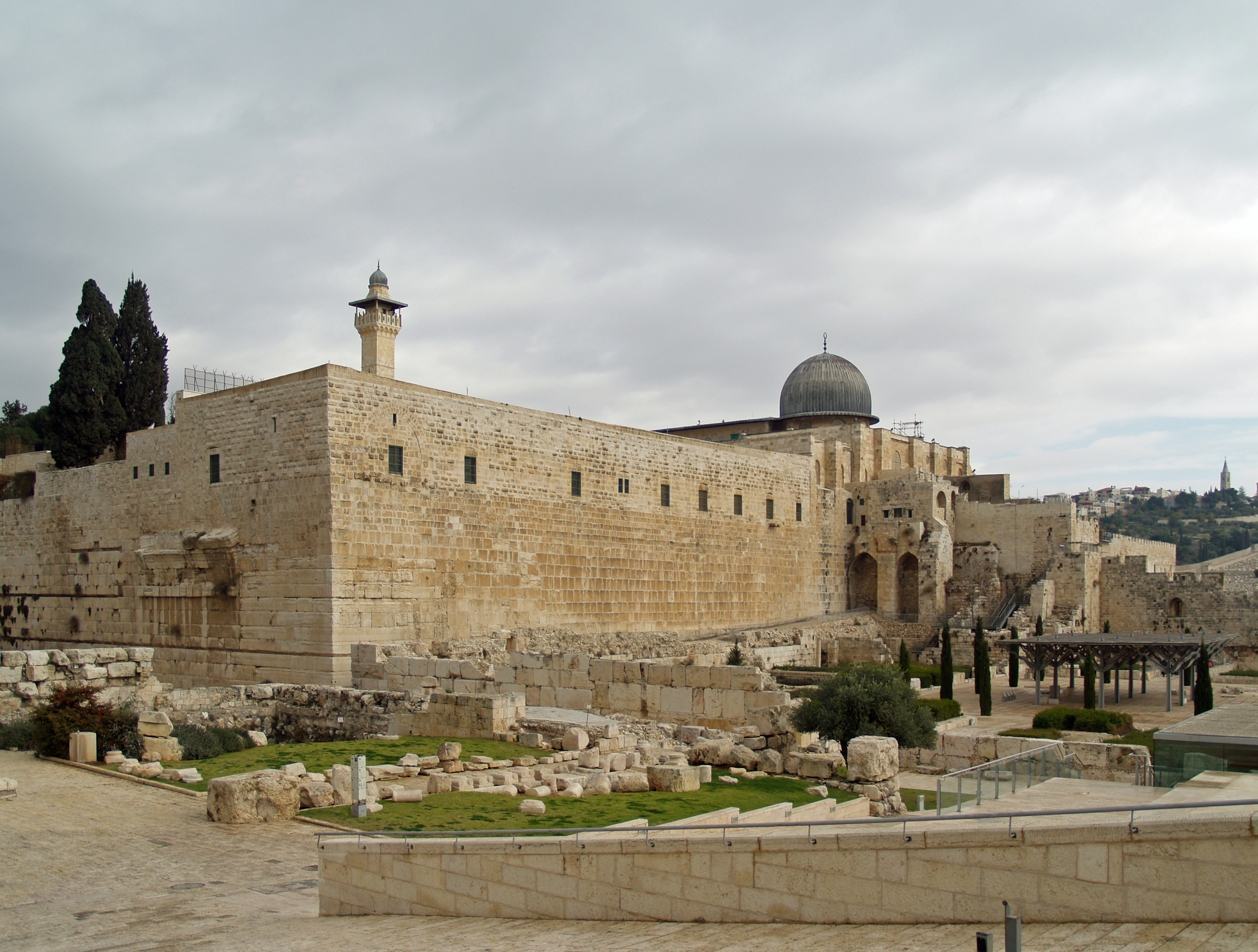
The Al-Aqsa Mosque above the Temple Mount's southern Wall. On the left are the remains of Robinson's Arch

Finds include Corinthian capitals, Doric friezes and modillion cornices. The motifs featured on the fragments found occasionally match patterns witnessed in other Second-Temple era public buildings unearthed in the region, while others reflect unique architectural characteristics. These include floral motifs, rosettes, cable patterns similar to finds in the Hauran region of southern Syria and acanthus leaves featured in Roman architecture.

== See also ==
- Herod's Temple - Herod's renovation of the Temple Mount
- Herodian architecture - other building projects undertaken by Herod
- Trumpeting Place Inscription - an inscribed stone unearthed nearby
- Al-Aqsa Mosque - Mosque currently occupying the site of the Royal Stoa
