= Haim Gitler =

Israeli curator and researcher

Dr. Haim Gitler
- חיים גיטלר
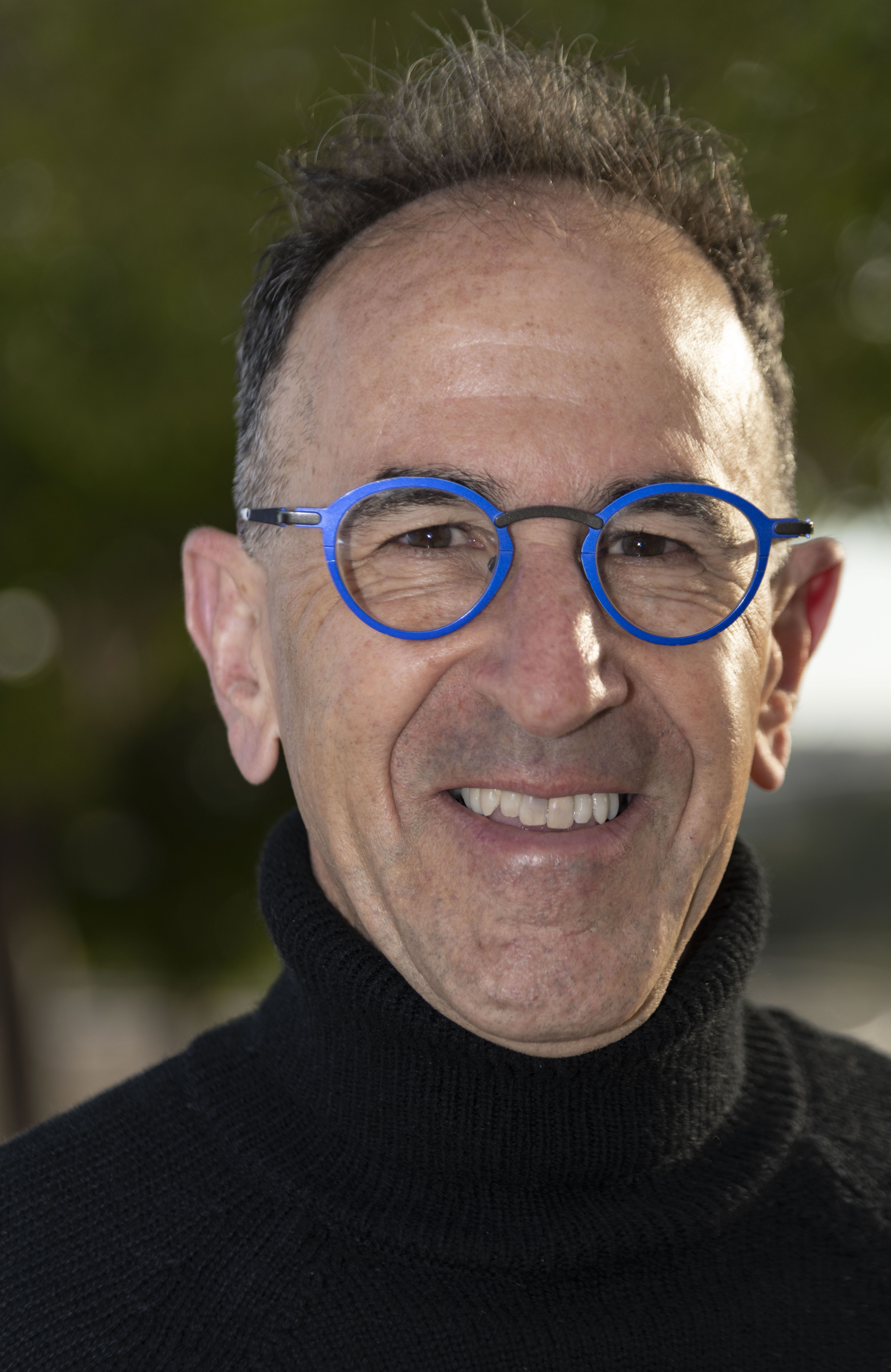
- Born: April 13, 1962 (age 64); Mexico
- Title: Tamar and Teddy Kollek Chief Curator of Archaeology at the Israel Museum; president of the Israel Numismatic Society

Academic background
- Education: The Hebrew University of Jerusalem; Nicolaus Copernicus University in Toruń

Academic work
- Discipline: Archaeology
- Sub-discipline: Numismatics
- Institutions: The Israel Museum, Jerusalem
- Main interests: The coinages of the late Persian and early Hellenistic Period Palestine: Philistia, Samaria, Judah and Edom

Haim Gitler (Hebrew: חיים גיטלר; born 1962) is an Israeli curator and researcher, specializing in the field of numismatics. He is chief curator of archaeology and curator of numismatics at the Israel Museum, Jerusalem, as well as the President of the Israel Numismatic Society.

Born in Mexico, Gitler immigrated to Israel in 1974. He received his BA and MA in Archaeology from the Hebrew University of Jerusalem, and a PhD from Nicolaus Copernicus University in Toruń, Poland. Gitler joined the staff of the Israel Museum in 1987, becoming Curator of Numismatics in 1994. In 2013, he was appointed the Tamar and Teddy Kollek Chief Curator of Archaeology at the Israel Museum, overseeing the museum's Samuel and Saidye Bronfman Archeology Wing, the Shrine of the Book, and the Rockefeller Archaeological Museum.

Gitler's research focuses on coinages of the late Persian and early Hellenistic periods in Palestine, including Philistia, Samaria, Judea, and Edom. He has published extensively on various aspects of ancient numismatics and has participated in archaeological expeditions in Israel and Jordan. In addition to his curatorial and research work, Gitler has taught numismatics at the Hebrew University and Tel Aviv University, and serves on the Bank of Israel's Committee for Planning Coins, Banknotes, and Commemorative Issues.

== Biography ==
Born in Mexico in 1962, Dr. Haim Gitler immigrated to Israel in 1974. He received his BA and MA in Archaeology from the Hebrew University of Jerusalem, and was awarded a PhD from Nicolaus Copernicus University in Toruń, Poland, in 2011. His doctoral research dealt with the coins of the Ancient Land of Israel in the Late Persian period and the beginning of the Hellenistic period. Gitler joined the staff of the Israel Museum, Jerusalem, in 1987, becoming Curator of Numismatics in 1994. As the curator of Numismatics, he is responsible for the collection of ancient coins in the possession of the Israel Museum. In this capacity, he oversaw the renewal of the permanent Numismatic galleries of in 1994 and 2010, as well as curating numerous temporary exhibitions of numismatics.

In 2013, in addition to being Curator of Numismatics, Gitler was appointed the Tamar and Teddy Kollek Chief Curator of Archaeology at the Israel Museum, with overall responsibility for the management of the Museum's Samuel and Saidye Bronfman Archeology Wing, as well as the Shrine of the Book – which houses the Dead Sea Scrolls – and the off-site Rockefeller Archaeological Museum in Jerusalem.

Gitler taught numismatics at the Rehovot campus of the Hebrew University from 1996 through 1998, and at Tel Aviv University from 2010 through 2014. From 2005 through 2016, he served as President of the Israel Numismatic Society (INS), founding its journal Israel Numismatic Research in 2006. In 2018, Haim was reelected President of the INS, a position he still holds today. In 2022, Gitler was elected to be one of the nine members of the Committee of the International Numismatic Council and was appointed Secretary of the committee. He is the first Israeli scholar elected as a member of the INC Committee. In addition, Gitler has served as a member of the Bank of Israel's Committee for Planning Coins, Banknotes, and Commemorative Issues. Concurrent with his various roles, Gitler is a photographer. In 1986 he was accepted as a member of the Association for the Promotion of the Art of Photography, which is affiliated with the Fédération Internationale de l'Art Photographique (FIAP). His photographs have been shown in three solo exhibitions in Israel: at the Jerusalem Theater, the Weizmann Institute of Science in Rehovot and the Photography Club in Tel Aviv. In 1986, his photographs were selected for an international show on behalf of "FIAP", exhibited in Italy and the Soviet Union.

== Research ==
Gitler is an active researcher in the field of Numismatics. His main areas of specialization include the coinages of the late Persian and early Hellenistic Periods in Palestine: Philistia, Samaria, Judea and Edom. He has published more than 100 academic articles on Electrum, Persian, Hellenistic, Roman, late Roman, Byzantine, Islamic, Crusader, and Modern coinages. In addition, Gitler has been a member of archaeological expeditions in Israel and Jordan. In Israel, he has published numerous articles on the numismatic findings from the excavations of the Jewish Quarter, Jerusalem; Ashkelon; the Ancient Boat in the Sea of Galilee; Har Adar and Khirbet el-'Aqd. He has also presented papers on the excavations in Jordan conducted by Father Michele Piccirillo of the Studium Biblicum Franciscanum: Mount Nebo, Umm al–Rasas and Madaba; and the excavations at Az-Zantūr in Petra, conducted by Prof. Bernhard Kolb of Basel University.

Other topics on which he has written extensively include papers on metallurgical analyses of coins and jewelry; Hacksilber hoards; Roman and Islamic coin dies; clay bullae from the excavations in at Az-Zantūr in Petra; Byzantine and Islamic weights; Crusader lead seals; magical amulets; and museology. He has collaborated with more than 35 scholars worldwide on these publications.

=== Selected academic publications ===
- The Coins of Coins: A World Premiere. Exhibition Catalogue, Jerusalem, 2004. In collaboration with François de Callataÿ.
- The Coinage of Philistia of the Fifth and Fourth Centuries BC. A Study of the Earliest Coins of Palestine, Milan, 2006, in collaboration with Oren Tal.
- The Nablus 1968 Hoard. A Study of Monetary Circulation in the Late Fourth and Early Third Centuries BCE in the Southern Levant, New York, 2019, in collaboration with Oren Tal, contributions by Arnold Spaer and Sylvia Hurter, Dana Ashkenazi and Adin Stern.
- The Silver Coinage of Septimius Severus and His Family 193–211 AD. A Study of the Chemical Composition of the Roman and Eastern Issues, Milan, 2003, in collaboration with Matthew Ponting.
- Sylloge of the Islamic Coins in the Israel Museum, The Paul Balog Collection, Egypt. III. The Mamluks 1248–1517, Trieste 2011, by Issa Baidoun and a contribution by Warren C. Schultz by Stefan Heidemann with the assistance of Haim Gitler.
- Faces of Power. Roman Gold Coins from the Victor A. Adda Collection, Formigine (MO), 2017, Haim Gitler and Gil Gambash (eds.).
- White Gold : Studies in Early Electrum Coinage, edited by Peter Van Alfen and Ute Wartenberg with Wolfgang Fischer-Bossert, Haim Gitler, Koray Konuk, and Catharine C. Lorber.
- Hansjörg Bloesch, Marguerite Spoerri Butcher, Haim Gitler, Kevin Butcher, Christian Schinzel, Benedikt Zäch Griechische Münzen in Winterthur, Bd. 3: Pamphylien bis Mauretanien, Nachträge, Erwerbungen 1970–1976 und Incerta, ausgewählte Erwerbungen bis 2005 (Veröffentlichung des Münzkabinetts Winterthur). Winterthur: Münzkabinett Winterthur, 2021.
- The Yehud Coinage: A Study and Die Classification of the Provincial Silver Coinage of Judah, in collaboration with Catharine Lorber, and Jean-Philippe Fontanille. This volume presents a die study of the provincial silver coinage of Judah in the late Persian, Macedonian, and early Hellenistic periods (2023).
- The Jeselsohn Collection of Coins of the Holy Land Volume I. Hacksilber, Persian and Early Hellenistic Coinage, Jerusalem 2024, by Haim Gitler, David Jeselsohn, Mati Johananoff and Oren Tal.
- Sylloge of the Islamic Coins in the Israel Museum, The Paul Balog Collection, Bilād al-Shām and the Jazīra: The Middle Islamic Period by Issa Baidoun, Stefan Heidemann and Matthias Naue with the assistance of Reuven Amitai and Haim Gitler (Forthcoming).
- A Corpus of Samarian Coinage from the Persian Period, Volumes I, Studies in Samarian Coins By Haim Gitler, Mati Johananoff, and Oren Tal. Numismatic Studies and Researches XIII, Jerusalem 2025.
- A Corpus of Samarian Coinage from the Persian Period, Volumes II, Catalogue of Samarian Coin Types By Haim Gitler, Mati Johananoff, and Oren Tal. Numismatic Studies and Researches XIV, Jerusalem 2025.

== Selected exhibitions at the Israel Museum ==
- More than Money – An Exhibition in Memory of Abraham Bromberg (1999)
- The Coins of Coins – A World Premier (2004), in collaboration with Prof. François de Callatay
- White Gold – Revealing the World's Earliest Coins (2012), in collaboration with Catharine Lorber and Yaniv Schauer
- Gold from the Sea – Newfound Treasure from Caesarea (2015), in collaboration with Dr. Robert Kool
- Coinage and Power in Ancient Israel from the Collection of the Israel Museum, Jerusalem (2015), Kunsthistorisches Museum, Vienna, a collaboration between the Israel Meseum and the Kunsthistorisches Museum
- Faces of Power – Roman Gold Coins from the Victor Adda Collection (2017), in collaboration with Yaniv Schauer and Dr. Gil Gambash

== Scholarships and awards ==
=== International ===
- Colin Kraay Scholarship, Ashmolean Museum, Oxford
- Robinson Visiting Scholarship (Heberden Coin Room), in association with the Kraay Visitorship Wolfson College, Oxford
- Visiting Scholar, Summer Graduate Seminar of the American Numismatic Society, New York
- Visiting Scholar, Sir Asher Joel Foundation, Macquarie University Department of Ancient History
- Prussian Cultural Heritage Foundation Scholarship, Staatliche Museen zu Berlin
- Medal of the Department of Cultural Heritage presented by the Polish Secretary of State
- Visiting Professors Program, Ossolineum, Wrocław
- Recipient of GIF (German-Israeli Foundation for Scientific Research and Development) grant, together with Prof. Stephan Heidemann and Prof. Reuven Amitai
- Member of the Silver Isotopes and the Rise of Money team, led by Prof. Francis Albarede, a project funded by the ERC (European Commission)
- Recipient of the 2024 Joseph Eckhel Medal of the Austrian Numismatic Society

=== In Israel ===
- Reuben Hecht Fellowship for Advanced Studies in Numismatics
- Weizmann Institute of Science Grant for Cooperation between the Sciences and Archaeology, in collaboration with Dr. Matthew Ponting (twice)
- The Ancient Israel Program of the Department of Archaeology and Ancient Near Eastern Cultures, Tel Aviv University, in collaboration with Prof. Oren Tal (twice)
- Israel Science Foundation (ISF) grant, in collaboration with Prof. Oren Tal
- Israel Science Foundation (ISF) grant, in collaboration with Prof. Oren Tal and Dr. Mati Johananoff
