= Winged wheel =

Symbol

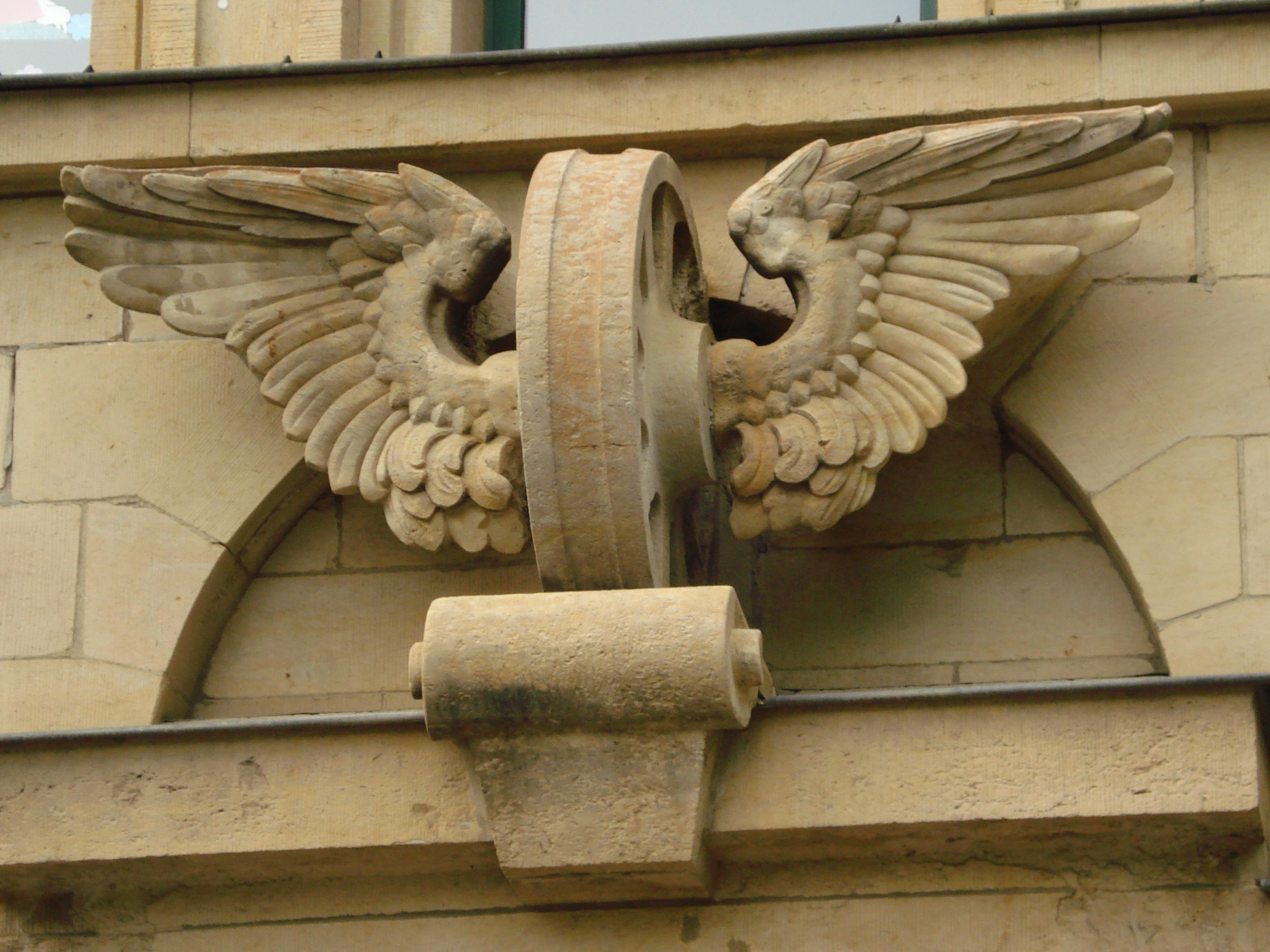
A two-winged wheel on a Deutsche Bahn (German railways) building in Dresden

A winged wheel or flying wheel is a symbol used on monuments by the ancient Greeks and Romans and more recently as a heraldic charge. The symbol is mostly formed with one or two wheels and one, two, or three wings—with one wheel and two wings being the most common form.

The symbol was historically associated with the ancient Greek god Hermes and Roman god Mercury. In heraldry the symbol has been used to represent transport, speed and progress. It is an international symbol for rail transport, and still forms the basis of many railway company logos. Other modern uses are for sport, cycling and motorbikes.

== History ==
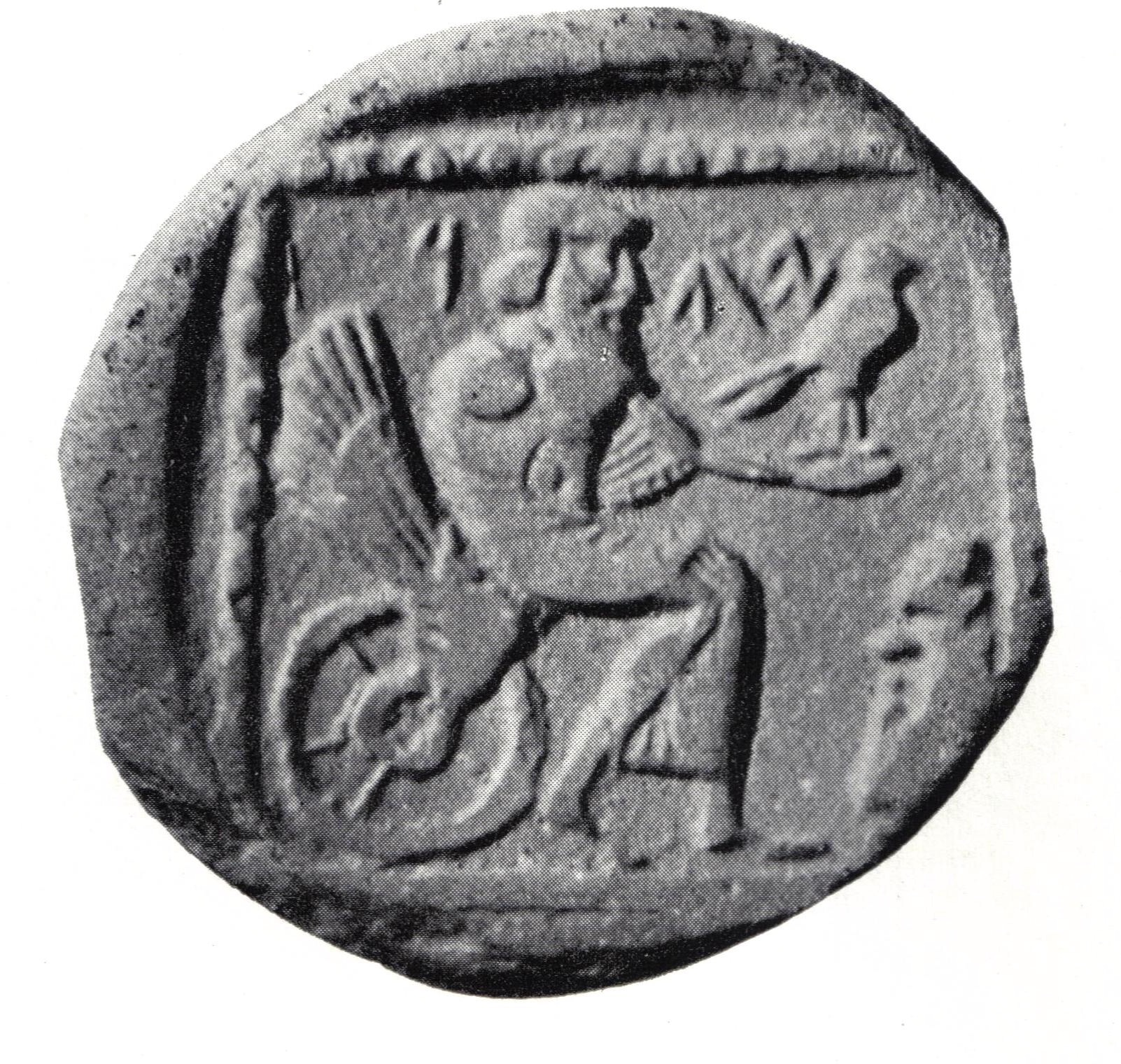
The God on the Winged Wheel coin, a silver drachm, with a deity seated on a winged wheel, probably struck during the Achaemenid Empire. 4th century BCE, British Museum

According to Eugène Goblet d'Alviella, the winged wheel is distinct from the older winged circle symbol which was commonly used in Mesopotamian and Assyrian symbolism. It was used by the ancient Greeks as a symbol of Hermes, the herald of the Gods. According to Goblet d'Alviella, the winged wheel was rare in Greco-Roman antiquity, and when it does appear it is mainly as an indication of a chariot or to symbolise motion:

Even the Winged Wheel, of which the symbolism of our industrial arts makes so frequent use, only appears by way of exception on Greek and Roman monuments, if we leave out the sort of velocipede on which Triptolemus rides; and even in these rare instances it appears merely as the abbreviation of a chariot, or as a symbol of motion, and in no case can it be connected with the Winged Circle which, on certain Asiatic monuments, originates in the Egyptian Globe.

— Eugène Goblet d'Alviella, The Migration of Symbols, 1894

== Use in heraldry ==
The winged wheel is used in heraldry, though plain wheels (usually cart wheels) and mill wheels are also used. However, the Catherine wheel torture device is the most common wheel symbol used in heraldry. The winged wheel has been shown with one, two or three wings.

When included in heraldic arms they are often emblems of engineering or transport; for example in the arms of the Institution of Municipal Engineers. However other meanings have included representing railroads, steam power, tourism, speed and progress. The device has also been used to represent the Holy Spirit of the Abrahamic religions.

In addition to his associations with movement and swiftness Hermes has medical associations (for example through his Caduceus staff). This led to the winged wheel's adoption by the US Army's 2nd Surgical Hospital, where it represented the unit's role in evacuating the wounded.

== Rail transport ==
Since the 1950s the winged-wheel logo has been increasing stylized away from the classical form. Traces of the winged-wheel or wings can still be found in abstract form in many railway company logos:

Austrian Federal Railways

BLS AG (Switzerland)

Bulgarian State Railways

Raaberbahn (Austria+Hungary)

East German Railway (ODEG)

Hungarian State Railways

Slovak Rail

Slovenian Railways

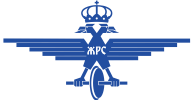
Railways of Republika Srpska

SJ AB (Swedish Railways)

Swiss Federal Railways

Vy (Norwegian State Railways until 2019)

PJKA (Indonesian State Railways 1953–1988)

Others logos include Romanian State Railways (CFR), Turkish State Railways (combining the winged wheel with a crescent and star), and Trainkos (previously Kosovo State railways).

Classic forms:

Collar badge of Polish railway troops

Great emblem of the Russian Railway Troops

The winged wheel is used on the collar badge of Polish railway troops, and as the emblem of Russian Railway Troops.

A two-winged wheel was the logo of the London General Omnibus Company. When this company was merged into Underground Electric Railways Company of London (UERL) in 1912 the logo was combined with the "disc and bar" of the UERL to form the basis of the modern London Underground roundel.

== Motorbikes ==
Matchless motorbikes and the Indianapolis Motor Speedway both use a winged wheel logo.

== Sport ==
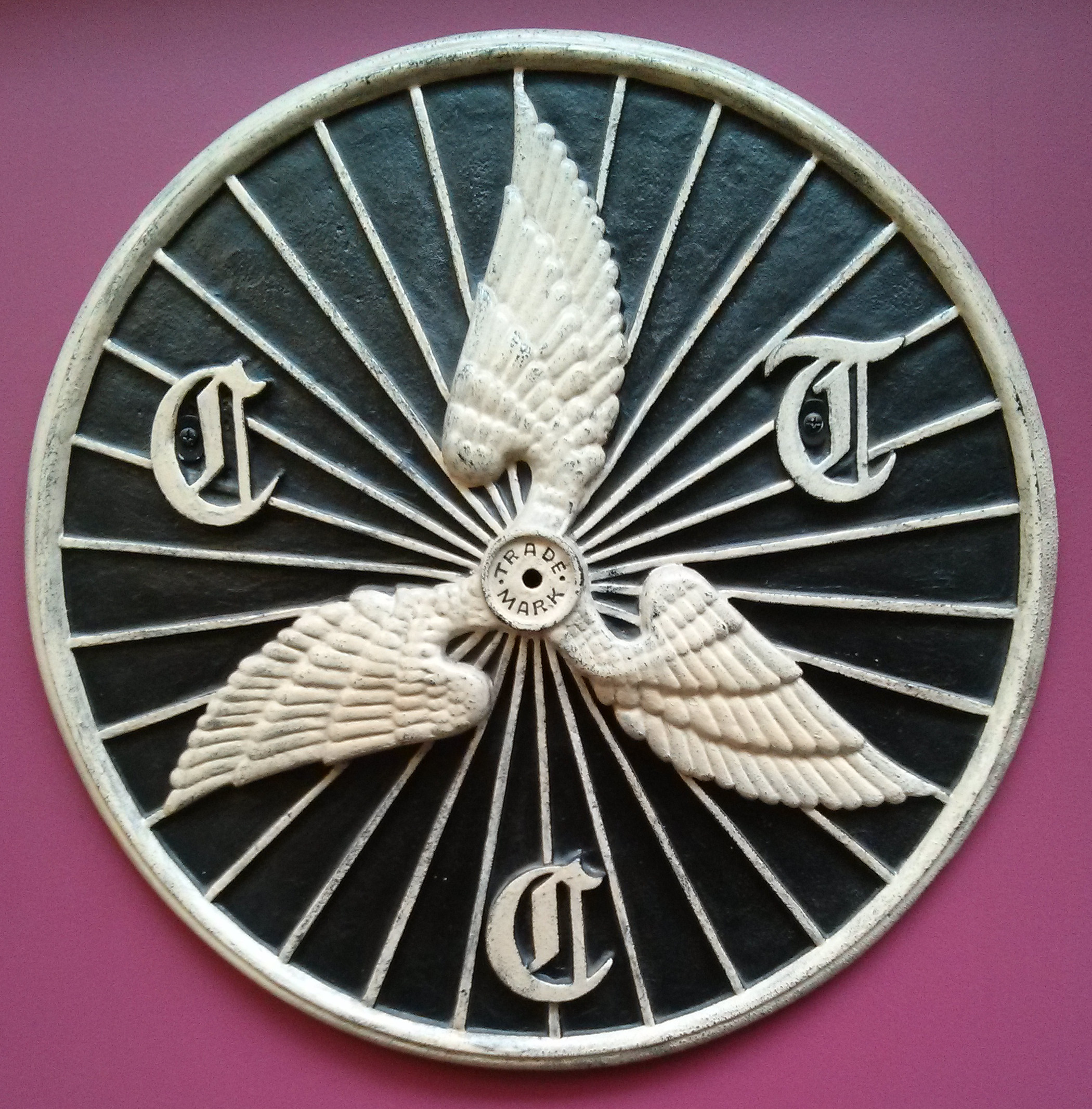
The three-winged Cyclists' Touring Club logo

A triple-winged wheel was adopted as the logo of the Cyclists' Touring Club (CTC) in 1886, possibly taking inspiration from earlier logos of the League of American Wheelmen and the Swift Cycling Club. The CTC logo quickly became "cycling’s most famous symbol", featuring on the outside of hotels associated with the CTC (known as "wheel houses") across the United Kingdom.

The Detroit Red Wings ice hockey team has used a winged wheel in its logo since 1933, when it adopted its current name. Owner James E. Norris drew inspiration for the logo from the Montreal Amateur Athletic Association, whose athletes wore a similar design.

== Textiles ==
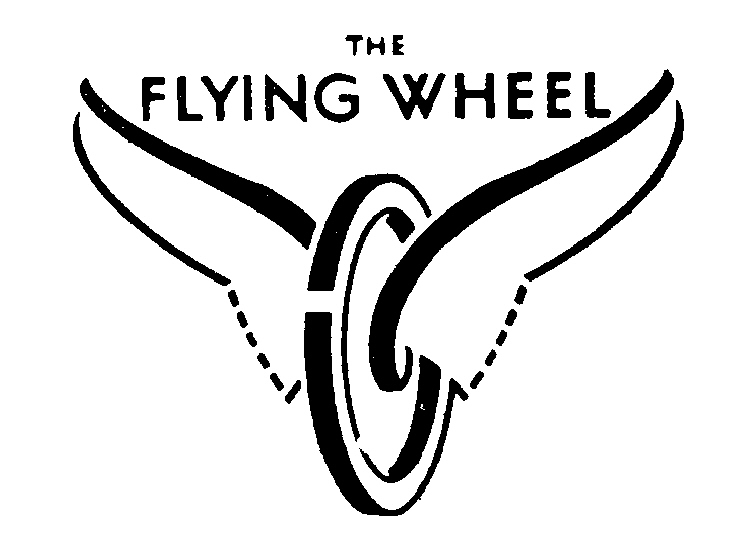
I & R Morley "Flying Wheel" trademark from 1926

The British hosiery manufacturer I. & R. Morley used a winged wheel logo in its "Flying Wheel" trademark.

== Geographical locations ==
A winged wheel in the fourth quarter of the coat of arms of Panama

A winged wheel symbol has been used in other contexts as various as the coat of arms of Panama and of the city of Edmonton in Canada, the flag of Knoxville, Tennessee, the badge of the Ohio State Highway Patrol, and the logo of Rotary Watches.

== See also ==
- Winged sun
