= Israel Numismatic Research =

Journal

- Discipline: Numismatics
- Language: English
- Edited by: Donald T. Ariel, Danny Syon

Publication details
- History: 2006–present
- Publisher: Israel Numismatic Society (Israel)
- Frequency: Yearly

Standard abbreviations
- ISO 4: Isr. Numis. Res.

Indexing
- ISSN: 1565-8449

Links
- Journal homepage; Online access

Israel Numismatic Research (INR) is an annual peer-reviewed numismatics journal of the Israel Numismatic Society (INS). The journal was established in 2006. INR includes articles primarily relating to coins circulating in the southern Levant in antiquity until the medieval period. The journal is a successor to earlier publications from the INS.

François de Callataÿ describes INR as conforming to "a high standard," and of "national" significance as a numismatic journal. INR is an important venue for the publication of hoards found in the Southern Levant.

In 2020, INR received the Shekel Prize for "best book published in 2019" from the American Israel Numismatic Association, with numismatist David Hendin describing the journal as "world-class." INR is counted as one of the eight archaeological journals in the Israeli journal index of Prof. Israel Hanukoglu.
