= American Israel Numismatic Association =

American Israel Numismatic Association is a non-sectarian cultural and educational organization dedicated to the study and collection of Israel's coinage, past and present, and all aspects of Judaic numismatics.

== History ==
The American Israel Numismatic Association is a democratically organized, membership oriented group, chartered as a non-profit association under the laws of The State of New York. The primary purpose is the development of publications, programs, meetings and other activities which will bring news, history, social and related background to the study and collection of Judaic numismatics, and the advancement of the hobby.

The organization was founded by Morris Bram in 1967.
